= List of executioners =

List of official executioners

This is a list of people who have acted as official executioners.

== Europe ==
=== Austria ===
==== Hall in Tirol ====
Lienhart von Grätz	1497–1504
Stefan Ruef	1503–1525
Hans Schaider	1525–1528
Heinrich Käser	1525
Johann Frey	1528–1571
Melchior Frey	1572–1578
Christof Tollinger	1578–1584
Michael Fürst	1584–1606
Sebastian Oberstetter	1606–1608
Jakob Kienle	1608–1611
Jakob Vollmar	1611–1618
Hans Has	1618–1642
Heinrich Hödel	1642–1645
Othmar Krieger	1645–1671
Jakob Zäch	1671–1677
Andreas Leiner	1677–1693
Kaspar Pöltl	1693–1698
Sebastian Waldl	1699–1718
Marx Philipp Abrell	1718–1728
Johann Jakob Abrell	1728–1746
Josef Langmayr	1746
Bartholomeus Putzer	1747–1772
Johann Georg Putzer	1772–1786

==== Meran ====
Hans Säbele	1488–1509
Martin Vogl	1510
Gilg von Rodem	1510–1515
Heinrich Reif	1515 and 1521–1522
Lorenz von Altsee	1515–1521
Heinrich Käser	1522–1525
Jakob Gatz	1524
Hans Schwingsmesser	1525–1536
Theodor Reichl	1572–1575
Johann Peter Vollmar	1552–1561
Klaus Seckler	1562
Melchior Frey	1563–1572
Mattheus Leonhard	1575–1601
Hans Fürst	1592
Georg Fürst	?–1621
Wolfgang Fürst	1605–1623
Wolfgang Helmschmied	1536–1552
Wolfgang Puechamer	1601–1605
Michael Pichler	1623–1631
Leonhard Oberdorfer	1632–1672
Johann Schlechuber	1672
Hans Schwarzhuber	1673–1675
Konrad Leonhard Krieger	1675–1679
Hans Jakob Müller	1679–1684
Franz Wagner	1684–1690
Jakob Fürst	1690–1694
Johann Georg Wacker	1694–1723
Johann Jakob Abrell	1723–1728
Johann Georg Kober	1728–1748
Martin Putzer	1748–1772
Bartholomeus Putzer	1772–1777
Franz Michael Putzer	1777–1787

==== Salzburg ====
Franz Joseph Wohlmut	1757–1817/21 (deceased 1823)

==== Steyr ====
Franz Wurm (hired for one execution in 1934)

==== Vienna ====
Paul?	~1463
Jörg Carlhofer	~1486
Schrottenbacher family	1550–1802
Joachim Stein	~1618
? Willenbacher	~1868 (Vienna-Meidling)
Johann Hamberger	~1700
Johann Georg Hoffmann I.	1802–1827
Simon Abel	1827–1839
? Seyfried	1829–
Johann Georg Hoffmann II.	1839–1865
Johann Georg Hoffmann III.	1865–1874
Heinrich Willenbacher	1874–1894
Karl Sellinger	1895–1899
Josef Lang	1900–1918
Johann Lang	1933–1938

=== Belgium ===
? Ance	~1789 (Rochefort)
Pierre Nieuwland	before 1918 – before 1929 (never executed anyone)

=== Luxembourg ===
Hans Gaspard Back	17th century

=== Norway ===
Augustus Høcker	1689–1721
Johan Heinrich Helmschläger	1684–1760
August Lædel	1733–1749
Anton Lædel	1799–1833
Torbjørn Pedersen	1828–1834
Samson Isberg	1841–1864
Theodor Larsen	1864–

=== Papal States ===
Giovanni Bugatti	1796–1865
Antonio Balducci	1865–1870

=== Poland ===
Jakub Starbothka	1443 Biecz – Executioner in the Royal City of Biecz
Jan Mueller	−1793
Stefan Böhm	1793–1813 or before
Maciejewski	−1928
Jan Maciejewski	−1932
Artur Braun	1932 (no executions, fired the morning after his nomination for shooting around woefully drunk while celebrating his new "job")
Piotr Śmietański	1948 or before 1951

=== Portugal ===
Belchior Nunes Carrasco	15th century (from his last name appeared the Portuguese word carrasco meaning hangman)

=== Romania ===
Ionel Boeru	leader of the Nicolae and Elena Ceauşescu firing squad 25 December 1989
Dorin Cârlan	member of the Nicolae and Elena Ceauşescu firing squad 25 December 1989
Octavian Gheorghiu	member of the Nicolae and Elena Ceauşescu firing squad 25 December 1989

=== Russia (USSR) ===
Mikhail Rodionovich Matveev	1918–1923 / 1927–1937 or 1939
Vasili Blokhin	1926–1952
Dmitry Vladimirovitch Uspensky	1929 (or before) – 1931 (or after)
Piotr Ivanovich Maggo	1931–1940
Ernst Ansovich Mach	1937– before 1948

=== Spain ===
==== Audiencia de Madrid ====
Francisco Ruiz Castellano	1879 (or before) – 1888 (or after)
Francisco Zamora	1888 (or after) – 1897
Áureo Fernández Carrasco	1897–1916
Casimiro Municio Aldea	1915–1935
Cándido Cartón	1940–1949 (see also Audiencia de Sevilla 1936–1939)
Antonio López Sierra	1949–1975

==== Audiencia de Barcelona ====
Nicomedes Méndez López	1866–1912
Rogelio Pérez Cicario	1913–1924
Federico Muñoz Contreras	1924–1935
Vicente López Copete	1953–1974

==== Audiencia de Burgos ====
Lorenzo Huertas	1885–1890
Gregorio Mayoral Sendino	1890–1928

==== Audiencia de Sevilla ====
José Caballero Quintana	active in 1906
Cándido Cartón	1936–1939 (see also Audiencia de Madrid 1940–1949)
Bartolomé Casanueva Ramírez	1940–1948
Bernardo Sánchez Bascuñana	1949–1972
José Monero Renomo	1972–1977

==== Audiencia de Valladolid ====
Florencio Fuentes Estébanez	1941 (or before) – 1953

==== Audiencia de Zaragoza ====
Marcos?	−1840
José González Irigoyen	1840–1896

=== Sweden ===
Mikael Reissuer (Stockholm)	1635–1650 (nicknamed Mäster Mikael)
Gabriel Alexandersson Meijer	end 1600s – beginning 1700s
Alexander Gabrielsson Meijer (Västmanland, Uppsala)	1721–1741 (son of Gabriel Alexandersson Meijer)
Gabriel Meijer d.ä. (Örebro)	1741–1765 or before (son of Alexander Gabrielsson Meijer)
Anders Persson Trafware	1702–1721 (Gävleborg)
Lars Flink (Östergötland)	active in 1719
Brun (Malmö)	active in 1743
Carl Hjerpe (Göteborg)	1765–1784
Lars Hjerpe (Göteborg)	1784–1807 (son of Carl Hjerpe)
Erik Lyckman (Kopparberg, Gävleborg, Västernorrland)	before 1794–1798
Jonas Sandwall (Asarum)	active in 1794
Niclas Öberg (Harbäcken, Strömsund)	−1813
Hemming Sjögren (Sjöbo)	1816 or before – 1825 or after (himself executed?)
Carl Magnus Lidman (Uppsala, Gävleborg, Västernorrland)	active in 1822
Olof Olsson Häll (military and settlement executioner)	1827–1833
Carl Ludvig Nafström (Stockholm)	1832–1859)
Styf (Hörsne, Gotland)	−1854 (himself executed for murder 5 March 1845)
Hans Carlsson (Blekinge, Skåne)	−1838
Anders Pettersson (Blekinge, Skåne)	1838–1868
Magnus Jarl	1840 or before – 1861 or after
Jacob Gyll (Västerbotten)	active in 1851
Johannes Jansson (Göteborg)	1854 or before – 1857 or after
Magnus Ferm (Örebro)	active in 1858
Johan Fredrik Hjort (Stockholm)	1859–1882
Per Petter Christiansson Steineck (Jönköping/Vadstena)	1861–1887
Albert Gustaf Dahlman (also called Anders Gustaf Dahlman; originally in Stockholm, from 1901 for the entire country)	1885–1920

=== Switzerland ===
==== Aargau ====
Franz Josef Mengis	carried out Canton (= State) of Aargau's last public execution 24 May 1854, in Lenzburg

==== Appenzell Innerrhoden ====
Ulrich Styvater	1404-

==== Basel ====
Bernhard Schlegel	−1374 (murdered by theft victim Peter Agsten after the thief hanged got back to live)
Claus von Offenburg	1393– or −1393 (?)
Hans Körber	1424–1436
Hans Seckeler	1430–1445
Hans Krämer	1445–1448 (nicknamed "Gangkly")
Hans Heyd	1448–1449
Ulrich von Eger	1449–1458
Ulrich von Honwile	1458–1467 or −1474 (?)
Hans Schatz	1474–1476
Jakob Rennisfeld	1476–1488
Jakob Nydegger	1488–1497
Ulrich	1497–1509
Conrad von Horn	1509–1511 or −1516 (?)
Hans Schenk	1516–1518
Gilg Beck	1518–1529
Jakob	1529–1537
Niklaus Rod	1537–1541
Jörg Volmar	1541 (himself decapitated for murder still in 1541)
Niklaus Schnatz	1545–1546, 1552 (contract executioner from Berne)
Pauli Fuerer	1559–1569 or – 1572 (?)
Georg Käser	1572–1592 or −1612 (?)
? Iseli	1612–1633
Thomas Iseli	1633
Conrad von Hagen	1633–1635
Georg?	1635–1652
Paulus Stunzt	1652 (contracted executioner from Saint-Gall)
Jakob Günther	1652–1692
Georg Friedrich Günther	1692–1714 or −1726 (?)
Hans Jakob Günther	1692
? von Hagen	1694–1695 or −1726 (?)
Sebastian Näher	1726–1745
Friedrich Näher	1745–1758 or −1766 (?)
Martin Mengis	1766–1804
Peter Mengis	1804–1838
Jacob Mengis	1838–1850 (contracted executioner from Aargau since Bâle chose to not have an own executioner after 1838.

==== Fribourg ====
? Deigentesch	~1716

==== Geneva ====
François Tabazan	before 1602 – before 1624
Jacob Mengis	(from Aargau), 1861

==== Glarus ====
? Vollmer	~1782
see also Schwyz

==== Lucerne ====
Baltzer Mengis	~1652 (also referred to as Balthasar Mengis)

==== Saint-Gall ====
Vollmar family	1695–
Johannes Bettenmann	−1843
see also Schwyz

==== Schwyz ====
Christoph Mengis	−1651
Christoph II. Mengis	1651–1681
Johannes Mengis	1681–1695
Balthasar Mengis	1695–1723
Bernhard Mengis	1723-
? Mengis	−1779
Johann Melchior Grossholz	−1815
Augustin Grossholz	1815–1826
Joseph Pickel	1826–1829
Oswald Schlumpf	1829–1830
Johann Bettenmann	1855–1857 (also for Saint-Gall)
Franz Xaver Schmid	1830–1855 (also for Zug and Glarus)

==== Thurgau ====
Johann Näher	1797–1839

==== Uri ====
Franz Josef Grossholz	active in 1765
Nikolaus Grossholz	active in 1833
Vinzenz Grossholz	1861–

==== Zug ====
Franz Grossholz	1822–
Arthur X.	25 August 1939 (official reference to the voluntary executioner of Paul Irniger, the "taxi killer of Baar"; born 16 September 1915, Arthur X. was given entrance at Burghölzli mental institution in Zürich because of paranoid schizophrenia 12 September 1947; September 1952 he was transferred to the Clinica Waldhaus mental institution in Chur where he deceased 26 January 1960)
see also Schwyz

==== Zürich ====
Cunrat Grossholz	1473–
Paulus Volmar	1587–
Hans Jakob Volmar
Hans Jakob II. Volmar
Johann Näher	1639–1650 (1623–1640 and again after 1650 in Lindau, Germany)
Hans Jakob III. Volmar	−1697
Hans Jakob IV. Volmar	1697- 1711
? Vollmer	1820s

==== Federal Executioner for all Swiss Death Penalty Cantons ====
Theodor Mengis	1879–1918
Theodor Mengis Junior	1918–1958

=== United Kingdom ===
Cratwell	to 1538 (London; in 1538 he was himself hanged for robbery)
"Stump-leg"	to 1556 (London; he was himself hanged for theft)
? Bull	before 1587–1601 (London)
Thomas Derrick	1601- before 1616 (London)
Gregory Brandon	before 1616- before 1640 (London)
Richard Brandon	before 1640–1649 (London)
George Joyce	1649 (London): Lieutenant-colonel Joyce was named as the person who executed King Charles I by William Lilly.
William Lowen	1649 (London)
Edward Dun	1649–1663 (London) (the subject of Groanes from Newgate, or an Elegy upon Edward Dun. Esq., the Citie's Common Hangman, who died naturally in his bed 11 September 1663. Written by a person of Quality)
John Crossland	c1660 (Derby) supposed to have been one of three members of the same family convicted and then appointed hangman to hang the other two and then remaining in post.
Jack Ketch	1663–1686 (London)
Paskah Rose	1686 (Bleackley (1929) graphs his name as Pasha Rose; London)
John Price	1714–1715 (London)
William Marvell	1715–1717 (London)
James Aird	1715–1723 (Scotland)
? Banks (known as Banks the Bailiff)	1717- after 1718 (London)
Richard Arnet	before 1726–1728 (London; hanged Jonathan Wild in 1725)
John Hooper	1728–1735 (London; known as "the laughing hangman")
John Thrift	1735–1752 (convicted of murder in 1750, but pardoned and continued in office). (London); executed Simon Fraser, 11th Lord Lovat on 9 April 1747, the last man to be beheaded in England. Thrift controversially was buried at St Paul's.
William Stout, of Hexham	1746 York; hanged Francis Buchanan, two hours before a reprieve arrived.
Robert Clarke, a Butcher	1749 Sussex; executed some smugglers and later hanged himself after being tricked out of money.
William Elliot	c1752 (London) executed at Tyburn on 10 June 1767 for housebreaking, he had been hangman earlier after John Thrift, Elliott was transported for felony, after the expiry of his term he returned continued as a common robber.
Thomas Turlis	1752–1771 (London); hanged Laurence Shirley, 4th Earl Ferrers with a silken rope, the last nobleman to be hanged in England)
Edward Hamlon	1756 (Dublin); arrested, identified as topman (or hangman) and sentenced to transportation for attempted robbery.
1760 (Oxford) in April 1760 the hangman enlisted into the army. It was reported that he had carried out many hangings.
Joseph Cartwright	1767 (Worcester) in April 1767 this prisoner was under sentence of transportation when he hanged Samuel Turner, for housebreaking.
Andrew Boyle	c1768 (Edinburgh) a prisoner hangman, escaped wearing his wife's clothes, he was captured and escaped again from Arbroath. He was recaptured and found in possession of a watch, banknotes and other stolen items. He had previously been convicted of theft and then enlisted as a soldier.
Edward Dennis	1771–1786 (London); the last hangman at Tyburn and the first at Newgate; died 21 November 1786 at his home in the Old Bailey) The hangman was arrested in 1780, and sent to the New Prison, Clerkenwell for involvement in crimes. He was convicted for his part in the riots.
Henry Thornton,	1773 (Sligo): Thornton the High Sheriff, had to step forward to carry out this when the official hangman was not at his post at the right moment, when Samuel Slack finished his speech to those assembled.
William Mcghie	c1775 (Glasgow): when arrested for theft in 1775, he was described as 'late hangman in Glasgow'. He was sentenced to be whipped through the city for repeated acts of theft, and banished for life.
? Allen	1777 (Lincoln): capitally convicted, then reprieved, he later hanged for Highway Robbery Thomas Hamm, a former accomplice of his.
Edward Barlow	1781–1812 (Lancashire)
A female	1782 (Dublin): an unidentied woman hanged two men for murder on 13th, November at Kilmainham, near Dublin. The men were also quartered. The sheriff received abuse for making a hangman of a woman.
Keenan	c1784 (Ireland): described as "late hangman of the New Prison and is now an approver at Kilmainham, was four times capitally convicted, and will again, by a defect on our laws, be turned loose to commit more depredations on the public"
Thomas Woodham	c1785 (Gloucester). Aged 69 executed for highway robbery in Ilchester in August 1785, described as a former Gloucester hangman
William Brunskill	career lasted from 1786 to 1814 (London) (started as assistant to Edward Dennis; executed Catherine Murphy in 1789, the last woman to be burned at the stake in England)
William Blackhall	c1787 (Oxford) reported as "on a former occasion, officiated as hangman, committed to our Castle, charged upon oath with stealing, out of a house".
John Howes	1792 (Norfolk): reported as "the hangman for Norfolk, committed to the house of correction at Wymondham, for want of sureties in a case of bastardy." In a similar article in the Norfolk Chronicle of 4 February 1792, he is described as "the finisher of the law for this county" ('finisher of the law' being a euphemism for hangman).
Thomas Davies	c1794 (Shropshire): reported as "hangman for city and county of Shropshire, the Principality of North Wales, Montgomeryshire etc. died 1794.
Samuel Burrows	1802–1834 (Cheshire)
William Taylor	−1810
Jonathan Cole	1802 (Suffolk): county hangman charged with stealing oats. He was sentenced to transportation.
William "John" Curry	1802–1835 (Yorkshire)
John Read	1803 (Hampshire): the county hangman placed in the stocks and to serve 6 months.
Edward Barlow	1806 (Lancashire): it was reported that Old Ned the hangman was committed to Lancaster Castle for stealing a horse. Edward Barlow for many years hangman, sentenced to be hanged for horse-stealing.
Josie Tait	c1807 (Dumfries): named in a poem published in 1807.
Patrick Halpen	c1794–1809 (Newgate) Died whilst in the office of Finisher of the Law he had occupied for thirteen years, his widow is thought may succeeded him in his role as hangman.
Donald Ross	1812–1834 (Inverness) appointed on a salary of £12 plus numerous perks. It was reported he was attached by a mob of mischievous boys and lads, and died on the spot. He was not replaced.
James Botting	1813/17–1819 (London)
John Langley	1814–1817 (London)
James Botting	1817–1820
John Milne (executioner)	−1818 (Aberdeen)
Thomas Cheshire	1820–1829 (London; known as "Old Cheese"; assistant from 1808 to 1820 and from 1820 to 1840)
James Foxen	1820–1829 (London; name also given as Foxten)
Samuel Haywood	1820–1848 (Leicestershire & the Midlands)
"Bungey's" Ralph Fleming	c1826 (Durham) Reported in the paper as being sought for theft of a cloak, the common hangman sentenced to 2 months in prison. He was sentenced to transportation for seven years for theft of a cotton gown in September 1829. It was said he had previously committed innumerable thefts.
William Lee	−1827
George Mitchell	1828–1845 (Southwest)
William Calcraft	1829–1874
James Coates	1835–1839 (Yorkshire) Coates was under sentence of seven years transportation but took on the role of hangman remaining in confinement at York Castle. He was one of three prisoners that escaped from the castle in 1839.
John Scott	1835–1847 (last executioner of Edinburgh) James Eddy was found guilty of his homicide, whilst drink he had assaulted Scott, who was said to be in frail health.
John Wilkinson	1839–1840 (Yorkshire; no execution carried out)
Nathaniel Howard	1840–1853 (Yorkshire)
George Smith	1843–1872
Thomas Askern	1856–1877 (initially Yorkshire)
Robert Anderson Evans	1873–1883
William Marwood	1872–1883
George Meker, or George Incher	1875–1881 (Staffordshire)
Bartholomew Binns	1883–1884
James Berry	1884–1891 (Home Office List)
James Billington	1884–1901 (Home Office List)
Thomas Henry Scott	1892–1895 (Home Office List)
William Warbrick	1893–1910 (Home Office List)
Thomas Billington	1897–1901 (Home Office List)
Henry Pierrepoint	1900–1910 (Home Office List)
John Ellis	1901–1923 (Home Office List)
William Billington	1902–1905 (Home Office List)
John Billington	1902–1905 (Home Office List)
William Willis	1906–1926 (Home Office List; assistant to John Ellis from 1906; assisted him in the execution of Hawley Harvey Crippen)
Thomas Pierrepoint	1906–1946 (Home Office List)
Robert Baxter	1915–1935 (Home Office List)
Thomas Phillips	1918–1941 (Home Office List)
Robert Wilson	1920–1936 (Home Office List)
Alfred Allen	1928–1937 (Home Office List)
Stanley Cross	1932–1941 (Home Office List)
Albert Pierrepoint	1932–1956 (Home Office List)
Henry Kirk, or Harry Kirk	1941–1950 (Home Office List)
Stephen Wade	1941–1955 (Home Office List)
Henry Bernard Allen	1941–1964 (Home Office List)
Herbert Allen	1949–early 1950s (assistant) not to be confused with Henry Bernard Allen above; both men were known socially as "Harry Allen"
Syd Dernley	1949–1954 (assistant)
Robert Leslie Stewart	1950–1964 (Home Office List)
Royston Lawrence Rickard	1953–1964 (assistant)
Harry Frank Robinson	1958–1964 (assistant)
Samuel Barrass Plant	1961–1964 (assistant)
John Underhill	1963–1964 (assistant)

=== Netherlands ===
==== Amsterdam ====
Gerardus Jansen	−1826
Jacobus Ras	1826–1837
Dirk Jansen	1837–1870

==== Groningen ====
Joannes Jansen	1821–1851

==== Utrecht ====
Hans Pruijm	1604–1621

==== Zutphen ====
Anna Catharina Snijder	1738–1803

=== Hungary ===
Until 1868 most of executors employed by one-one bigger cities (who possessed the "pallosjog " [right for execution] e. c. Buda) or travellers(gypsied) did this as temporary job(until the 18th century). Emperor Joseph II introduced a law reform. The separate legislatures of the cities will be abolished, as will the patrimonial tribunal and the "pallos jog" of the estates. Before that, bakó(executioner) belonged to the status of the county, the city, the larger estate, now five executioners will be enough throughout Hungary. Later he abolished even the capital punishment(except in the military cases)but in 1795 Emperor Franz I. reintroduced.

*Schüch Pál executioner of Pest

The list of state executioners

- Kornberger, Mihály executioner (1850?–1867)[He was executioner of Buda but later became a non official executioner of the whole country in criminal but not political cases]
- Kozarek, Ferenc state executioner( 1876–1894)
- Bali, Mihály state executioner (1894–1925)
- Gold, Károly state executioner (1925–1928)
- Kozarek, Antal state executioner (1929–1932)
- Id.(Senior) Bogár(Kovács), János state executioner (1932–1944)
- Ifj. (Junior) Bogár, János state executioner (1944–1965?) (He executed: before 1945: some political prisoners, after 1945: Ferenc Szálasi, László Rajk, Imre Nagy and all death sentenced people between this time).
- Pradlik, György the last state executioner (−1988)

=== Ireland ===
Ireland consisted of the Kingdom of Ireland between 1534 and 1800; it was part of the United Kingdom of Great Britain and Ireland 1801–1922; after that it was Northern Ireland and the Irish Free State; from 1937 the southern part was the Republic of Ireland.

- William Marwood
- James O'Sullivan
- Albert Pierrepoint
- Elizabeth Sugrue

=== Kingdom of Bohemia / Czechoslovakia (now Czech Republic) ===
Jan Mydlář	1572–1664 (Prague)
? Sperling	~1578 (Brno)
? Kotzurek	~1835 (Brno)
Alois Seyfried	1848–1849 (died 1869) (Brno, also last executioner for Bosnia and Herzegovina)
Johann Baptist Pipperger (Jan Křtitel Piperger in Czech)	1865–1888 (Prague)
Leopold Wohlschläger	1888–1927 (Prague)
? Nehyba	1927–
Vladimír Trunda	hangman of Milada Horáková, only the name is known
František Skořepa	hangman of Rudolf Slánský, only the name is known

=== Denmark ===
Theodor Seistrup	1881–1901
Carl Christensen	1906–1929

=== France ===
==== Alsace ====
===== Bas-Rhin (67) =====
====== Andlau ======
Philippe Hertrich	1702–1732
Philippe Hertrich	1732–1767
Jean-Gaspard Ostertag	1767–1780
Léopold Ostertag	1780–1793

===== Benfeld =====
Jean Ostertag	1649–1667
Jean-Philippe Roch	1667–1704 (his last name also appears as Rauch)
Matthieu Wees	1704–1737
François-Joseph Wees	1737–1749

===== Bernardswiller =====
see: Andlau

===== Bischwiller =====
Jean-Henri Hermann	1690–1692
Jean-Barthélémy Reuter	1692–1715
Jean-Georges Hermann	1715–1782
Jean-Michel Hermann	1782–1793

===== Bouquenom =====
see: Sarre-Union

===== Bouxwiller =====
Matthieu Frey	active in 1613
Jean Schild	1641–1644
Jean-Valentin Wees	1644–1676
Jean-Philippe Wees	1676–1689
Jean-Jacques Wees	1689–1696
Jean-Georges-Frédéric Wees	1696–1729
Jean-Valentin Wees	1729–1765
Jean-Michel Wees	1765–1793

===== Brumath =====
Jean Ostertag	active in 1636
Jean-Georges Wees	active in 1665
Ulrich Schweitzer	c. 1690
Jean-Michel Rhein	1704–1730
Jean-Jacques Rhein	active in 1730
Frédéric Rhein	active in 1744
Georges-Jacques Grosholtz	active in 1793

===== Châtenois =====
see: Villé

===== Dambach-la-Ville =====
Jacques Ostertag	active in 1609
Jean Ostertag	c. 1630–1667
Jean-Jacques Rauch	1667–1681
Jean Halter	1681–1716

===== Diemeringen =====
Jean-Nicolas Igel	1703–1741

===== Elsenheim =====
see: Ohnenheim

===== Epfig =====
Thomas Burckhard	active in 1623
Jean Halter	1716–1750
Ignace Halter	1750–1762

===== Erstein =====
see: Epfig

===== Fleckenstein (Lembach) =====
see: Memmelshoffen

===== Fouchy =====
see.: Villé

===== Geispolsheim =====
Jean-Georges Stoeckel	1705–1723
Jean-Georges Stoeckel	1723–1739

===== Goersdorf =====
Jean-Henri Hermann	1660–1692
Jean-Henri Hermann	c. 1692–1708
Jean-Henri Hermann	c. 1708–1747
Jean-Georges Hermann	c. 1747–1754
Jean-Michel Hermann	1754–1761
Pierre Hermann	1761–1767

===== Gougenheim =====
Jean-Louis Schweitzer	1689–1733
François-Antoine Burck	1733–1760
Ignace-Jonas Rauch	1760–1793

===== Gumbrechtshoffen =====
see: Gundershoffen

===== Gundershoffen =====
Nicolas Reuter	1728–1745
Philippe Reuter	c. 1745–1766
Jean-Louis Reuter	1766–1787
Jean-Louis Reuter	1787–1793

===== Haguenau =====
Jean Halter	active in 1587
Jean Burckhard	active in 1612
Jean-Georges Wees	1650–1689
Jean-Jacques Wees	1690–1712
Philippe Burck	c. 1740–1743
Georges-Frédéric Seidler	active in 1776

===== Herrlisheim =====
Jean-Georges Burckhard	active in 1612
Jean-Jacques Lohri	1697–1717
Jean-Martin Rhein	1717–1735 époux de Barbara LOHR habitaient au "Hundsgalgen" (Chroniques familiales Auguste KOCHER)
Jean-Valentin Rhein	1735–1771 nettoyait les prisons en 1774
François-Antoine Wees	1771–1790
Arbogast Rhein	1790–1793 époux de Anne Marie HEITZ, une fille Catherine née en 1791

===== Hochfelden =====
Jean-Jacques Kirschner	active in 1686
Jean-Jacques Burckhard	1686–1701
Jean-Thibaud Stoeckel	1701–1736/38
Jean-Thibaud Stoeckel	1736/38–1748
Georges-Adolphe Burck	1765–1773
Charles-Antoine Burck	1790–1793

===== Ingwiller =====
Jean Schild	1644–1647
Jean-Valentin Wees	1647–1670 (interim; executioner of Bouxwiller)
Matthieu Schild	1670–1722
Jean-Henri Schild	1722–1741
Jean-Michel Schild	1741–1763
Jean-Michel Schild	1763–1793

===== La Petite-Pierre =====
Jean-Pierre Bour	1739–1763
Jean-Pierre Bour	1763–1782
François Rhein	1782–1793

===== Lalaye =====
see.: Villé

===== Lauterbourg =====
Steinmayer	c. 1635
Jean-Georges Lohri	1717–1758

===== Maisonsgoutte =====
see.: Villé

===== Marckolsheim =====
Thomas Burckhard	active in 1623
Jacques Bengler	c. 1670
Jean-Georges Bengler	active in 1676
Jean-Thibaud Bengler	active in 1688
Jean-Michel Bengler	active in 1701
Jean-Georges Bengler	1717–1740

===== Marmoutier =====
Jean-Georges Ittinger	c. 1690

===== Memmelshoffen =====
Jean-Henri Hirth	active in 1763

===== Molsheim =====
Jean-Valentin Wees	c. 1635–1644

===== Mommenheim =====
Jean-Michel Burckhard	1699–1739
Antoine Rhein	1769–1782

===== Nordhouse =====
Jean-Martin Rieger	1688–1713
Jean-Henri Rhein	1713–1732
Matthieu Rieger	1732–1762
François-Joseph Rieger	1762–1793

===== Obernai =====
Jean Bengler	1595–1602
Michel Furcht	active in 1609
Michel Lautenmueller	1609–1614
Pancrace Furcht	1614–1621
Jean Furcht	1621–1634
Jean-Georges Heidenreich	1634–1643
Georges Vollmar	1643–1657
Jean Halter	1657–1672
Matthieu Wees	1672–1720
Christian Wees	1720–1761
Ignace Halter	1761–1778
Jean-Gaspard Ostertag	1778–1780
Léopold Ostertag	1780–1783
Jean-Baptiste Braun	1783–1793

===== Ohnenheim =====
Jonas Roch	1725–1748 (last name also given as Rauch)
Jean-Georges-Adolphe Roch	1748–1775 (last name also given as Rauch)
Gervais Roch	1775–1793 (last name also given as Rauch)

===== Otterswiller =====
see: Saverne

===== Petersbach =====
see: La Petite-Pierre

===== Reichshoffen =====
see: Gundershoffen

===== Reutenbourg =====
François Rieger	c. 1720–1730
François-Adam Rieger	1730–1744

===== Riedheim =====
see: Bouxwiller

===== Sarre-Union =====
Jean-Frédéric Schaeffer	1625–1654
Claude Urich	1654–1691
Jean-Jacques Grosholtz	1691–1698
Jean-Philippe Schild	1698–1735
Jean-Michel Schild	1735–1769
Pierre Hermann	1769–1793

===== Saverne =====
Jean-Georges Burck	1673–1679
Jean-Jacques Rhein	c. 1710–1716
Jean-Jacques Rhein	1716–1750
Jean-Georges Rhein	1750–1793

===== Schopperten =====
see: Sarre-Union

===== Sélestat =====
Ittinger	active in 1595
Christian Ittinger	1658–1675
Jean-Henri Burckhard	1675–1684
Jonas Ittinger	1684–1699
Georges-Frédéric Grosholtz	1699–1701
Jonas Felder	c. 1720–1725
Jonas Roch	1725–1748 (last name also given as Rauch)
François Heidenreich	1777–1793

===== Strasbourg =====
Jean Vollmar	1562–1577
Gaspard Immion	1577–1583
Michel Comte	1583–1587
Jean Halter	1587–1591
Jean Ginter	1612–1628
Christian Burckhard	1631–1670
Jean-Michel Grosholtz	1670–1686
Jean-Melchior Grosholtz	1686–1691
Jean-Michel Grosholtz	1691–1724
Jean-Georges Franck	1724–1756
Jean-Joseph Grosholtz	1756–1761
Valentin Grosholtz	1763–1785
Georges-Frédéric Maegert	1785–1807
Georges-Louis Maegert	1807–1830
Georges-Frédéric Maegert	1830–1849
Laurent Bornacini	1849–1850

===== Surbourg =====
Jean-Guillaume Stoeckel	1723–1757
Antoine Stoeckel	1757–1768

===== Villé =====
Jean-Georges Burckhard	1687–1705
Jean-Conrad Ginter	1705–1710
Melchior Burckhard	1717–1730
Jean-Georges Burckhard	1730–1732
Antoine Ginter	1732–1746
Jean-Michel Ginter	1746–1747
François-Joseph Burckhard	1747–1748
Melchior Rhein	1748–1787
Georges-Frédéric Mengis	1787–1793

===== Wasselonne =====
Christian Burckhard	c. 1670–1689
Jean-Georges Burckhard	1689–1700
Jean-Nicolas Franck	1700–1708
Jean-Jacques Grosholtz	1708–1717
Jean-Conrad Bauernfeind	1750–1790
Jean Bauernfeind	1790–1793

===== Westhoffen =====
see: Wasselonne

===== Weyersheim =====
Thibaud Burckhard	active in 1612
Georges-Frédéric Burck	1717–1739
Jean-Jacques Reuter	active in 1762

===== Wissembourg =====
Lazare Wees	active in 1650
Jean-Michel Vollmar	1706–1711
Jean-Pierre Steinmayer	active in 1715

==== Haut-Rhin (68) ====
===== Altkirch =====
Georges Fleischmann	active in 1584
Erhard Gilg	active in 1624
Michel Ginter	active in 1627
Jacques Ginter	active in 1630
Henri Fleischmann	active in 1636
Georges-Frédéric Heidenreich	1647–1654
Matthieu Ostertag	1654–1694
Georges-Adolphe Ostertag	1694–1730
Jean Ortscheid	1730–1754
Jean-Philippe Burck	1754–1781
François-Joseph-Antoine Ostertag	1781–1793

===== Biesheim =====
Melchior Ginter	1688–1714
Melchior Ginter	1714–1737
Georges-Frédéric Mengis	active in 1749
Protais Roch	1788–1793 (last name also appears as Rauch)

===== Colmar =====
Jean Heyd	c. 1440
Jean Buebe	1454–1458
Henri Schaedel	active in 1474
Christian Mueller	1598–1642
Jean-Georges Heidenreich	1644–1679
Melchior Ginter	1679–1692
Georges-Adolphe Heidenreich	1692–1716
Jean-Jacques Ginter	1716–1722
Melchior Ginter	1722–1733
Georges-Frédéric Ginter	1733–1736
Georges-Frédéric Burckhard	1736–1747
Georges-Michel Vollmar	1747–1754
Georges-Frédéric Vollmar	1754–1764
Jean-Jacques Vollmar	1764–1806
Jean-Guillaume Vollmar	1806–1833
Jean Zimber	1833–1841
Matthieu Spirckel	1841–1847
Nicolas Cané	1847–1870

===== Ensisheim =====
Ittinger	c. 1650
Jean-Georges Mengis	1671–1693
Georges-Melchior Mengis	1693–1699
Jean-Michel Mengis	1699–1721
Pierre Mengis	1721–1736
François-Michel Roth	1768–1793

===== Ferrette =====
Jean Gilg	1570–1582
Jean Gilg	1582–1619
Erhard Gillig	1619–1620
Matthieu Mercklen	active in 1628
Matthieu Ostertag	1677–1735
Georges-Frédéric Ostertag	1735–1746
Jean-Jacques Comte	1746–1764
François-Oswald Seidler	1764–1780
François-Antoine Comte	1780–1790

===== Landser =====
Jean-Erhard Baumert	1611–1628
Thomas Burckhard	1628–1629
Wernhard Grosholtz	1629–1640
Martin Grosholtz	1640–1653
Jean Ostertag	1653–1717
Matthieu Ostertag	1717–1729
Jean-Georges Ostertag	1729–1736
Pierre Mengis	1736–1753
François-Joseph-Antoine Ostertag	1753–1793

===== Masevaux =====
Thibaud Lacour	c. 1665
Jean-Josse Ostertag	1680–1685
Laurent Ostertag	1706–1736
Jacques-Christophe Ostertag	1736–1762
Georges-Frédéric Seidler	1762–1769
Christophe Ostertag	1769–1793

===== Morschwiller-le-Bas =====
see: Mulhouse

===== Mulhouse =====
Jean Mennly	c. 1507
Guy Bartlin	1545–1553
Barthélémy Iring	1553–1554
Louis Kremer	1554–1555
Jean Waltz	1555–1560
Jean Hummel	1560–1565
Jacques Rueb	1565–1569
Gaspard Fues	1569–1587
Martin Hummel	1587–1596
Ulrich Grosholtz	1596–1624
Jean-Michel Grosholtz	1624–1637
Jérôme Ginter	1637–1662
Christian Burckhard	1662–1678
Christian Burckhard	1678–1709
Jean-Rodolphe Vollmar	1709–1712
Jean-Etienne Hirschfeld	1712–1735
Jean-Henri Naeher	1735–1764
Pierre Mengis	1753–1764
François Mengis	1764–1775
Pierre Mengis	1775–1793
François-Joseph-Pierre-César Mengis	1793–1798

===== Ribeauvillé =====
Jean Bardouil	active in 1633
Jean-Michel Burckhard	1660–1697
Jean-Georges Burck	1697–1727
Jean-Georges Burck	1727–1764
Jean-Georges Burck	1764–1790
Jean-Georges Burck	1790–1793

===== Rouffach =====
Jean-Conrad Ginter	1600–1615
Melchior Ginter	1615–1634
Melchior Ginter	1634–1649
Jean Fuend	1649–1652
Jean-Jacques Ginter	1652–1653
Matthieu Fuend	active in 1653
Melchior Ginter	1653–1681
Melchior Ginter	1681–1714
Melchior Ginter	1714–1733
Georges-Frédéric Seidler	1733–1775
Gervais-Frédéric Seidler	1775–1793

===== Sainte-Marie-aux-Mines =====
see: Ribeauvillé

===== Thann =====
Bibwand	c. 1545
Balthazar Schaeflein	1580–1615
Balthazar Ginter	1615–1626
Balthazar Schaeflein	1626–1634
Balthazar Schaeflein	1634–1660
Melchior Ginter	1660–1664
Balthazar Schaeflein	1664–1691
Jean-Georges Ostertag	1691–1718
Matthieu Ostertag	1718–1748
Jean-Baptiste Reisser	1748–1767
Jean-Joseph Reisser	1767–1791
Jean-Philippe Ostertag	1791–1793

===== Traubach (Traubach-le-Bas and Traubach-le-Haut) =====
Jean-Jacques Ginter	1679–1686
Melchior Burckhard	1686–1691
Christian Burckhard	1717–1743
Jean-Jacques Burckhard	1750–1767
Joseph Ostertag	1764–1774
Jean-Jacques Ostertag	1774–1793

===== Vieux-Thann =====
see: Thann

===== Zimmerbach =====
Christian Hertrich	active in 1613

=== Aquitaine ===
==== Dordogne (24) ====
===== Périgueux =====
Matthieu Pradel	1779–1822
Pierre Pradel	1822–1827
Louis-François-Gabriel Deville	1827–1837
Jean-Baptiste Champin	1837–1839
Jean Rascat	1839–1849

==== Gironde (33) ====
===== Bordeaux =====
Lauffort	active in 1416
Jean Maloizeau	active in 1455
Jean Maloizeau	active in 1502
Bernard Robert	c. 1525
Jansenot de Fousse	active in 1535
Jamet de Fousse	active in 1542
Pierre de Villac	active in 1542
Guichard Deymier	1549–1552
Arnaud de Villac	c. 1562
Jacques de Villac	c. 1570
Louis Maubert	c. 1580
André Chaigneau	active in 1582
Pierre de La Boucherie	1596–1598
Pierre Gantet	active in 1665
Julien Dupré	1674–1675
Pierre Duret	active in 1675
Antoine Royère	active in 1675
Arnaud Pignot	1675–1684
Guillaume Lespine	1684–1685
François Marquison	active in 1686
Jean Escuvé	1700–1706
Louis Verdier	1706–1731
Pierre Verdier	1731–1760
Jean Faroux	1760–1780
Jean Peyrussan	1780–1788
Jean Peyrussan	1788–1801
Jean Peyrussan	1801–1809
Jean Peyrussan	1809–1819
Jean-Baptiste Scarron	1819–1821
Joseph Sauvage	1821–1853
Henri-Charles Desmorest	1853–1870

==== Landes (40) ====
===== Dax =====
Jean-Louis Hébert	1792–1795
François-Claude Chrétien	1795–1797
Bénigne-Nicolas-François Brochard	1797–1798
Jean Peyrussan	1798–1806
Raymond Peyrussan	1806–1822
François Peyrussan	1822–1846
Jean-Baptiste-Louis Roch	1846–1849 (last name also given as Rauch)

==== Lot-et-Garonne (47) ====
===== Agen =====
Maurice	c. 1575
Jean Gastebois	1691–1692
Jean Rascat	1784–1788
Guillaume Augé	1788–1793
Jean Peyrussan	1793–1794
Pierre Rigal	1794–1796
Joseph Peyrussan	1796–1802
Gilles-François Berger	1802–1805
François Berger	1805–1808
Joseph Pavot	1808–1827
Pierre Berger	1827–1831
Jean-Pierre Étienne	1831–1839
Jean-Baptiste Champin	1839–1856
Vincent Bornacini	1856–1860
Laurent-Désiré Desmorest	1860–1870

==== Pyrénées-Atlantiques (64) ====
===== Bayonne =====
Jean Faroux	1729–1738
Vidal	active in 1746
Jean-Pierre Peyrussan	1746–1792
Gelpy	1792–1793

===== Pau =====
Guillaume Gayme	active in 1463
Simon Marensin	1640–1643
Jean Desplats	1643–1644
Henri Dubois	1653–1660
Dubois	active in 1660
Antoine Cassou	1740–1765
Jean Cassou	1765–1780
Jean Faroux	1780–1822
Joseph Faroux	1822–1853
Vincent Bornacini	1853–1856
Joseph Rascat	1856–1870

=== Auvergne ===
==== Allier (03) ====
===== Moulins =====
Jérôme Bodin	1762–1767
Jean Desfourneaux	active in 1767
Jean-Baptiste Jean	1793–1828
Jacques-Christophe Gruneisen	1828–1841 (his last name is also rendered as Grinheiser)
Louis-Jacques-Eugène Gruneisen	1841–1849 (his last name is also rendered as Grinheiser)

==== Cantal (15) ====
===== Aurillac =====
Jean Robertie	1716–1750
Jean Robertie	1750–1761
Antoine-Michel Foyez	1761–1763
André-Joseph Foyez	1763–1793
Joseph Foyez	1793–1795

===== Saint-Flour =====
Tourette	active in 1790
Jean Foyez	1790–1823
André-Joseph Foyez	1823–1835
Bernard Gatheuil	1835–1836
Joseph-Antoine Deibler	1836–1853

==== Haute-Loire (43) ====
===== Le-Puy-en-Velay =====
Jean Lacroix	1780–1789
François Faroux	1800–1802
Claude Hermann	1802–1815
Nicolas Hermann	1815–1842
Eloi-Désiré Hermann	1842–1850

==== Puy-de-Dôme (63) ====
===== Clermont-Ferrand (former Clermont-d'Auvergne) =====
Jean Dubois	c. 1720
Pierre Dubois	1730–1749
Geniès Armilhon	1749–1764
Martin Courtois	1764–1789
Frédéric Courtois	1789–1790
Simon Jean	1790–1791

===== Riom =====
Simon Jean	1791–1798
Michel Benoist	1798–1803
François Étienne	active in 1843

=== Basse-Normandie ===
==== Calvados (14) ====
===== Bayeux =====
Charles-Louis Jouenne	1774–1776

===== Caen =====
Nicolas-Jean Jouenne	1621–1633
Nicolas-Robert Jouenne	1663–1692
Nicolas Férey	1727–1738
Charles-François Jouenne	1738–1748
Charles-Lubin Jouenne	1748–1776
Nicolas-François Férey	1761–1763
Charles-Louis Jouënne	1776–1820
Charles-Nicolas-Lubin Jouënne	1820–1840
Matthieu Spirckel	1840–1841
Nicolas Wolff	1841–1847 (from 1847 to 1855 executioner of Alger, Algeria)
Joseph Baroux	1847–1849
Eugène Ganié	1849–1850
Louis-Jacques-Eugène Gruneisen	1850–1870 (his name also appears as Grinheiser)

===== Falaise =====
Jean Bouëtard	1724–1748
Jean Bouëtard	1748–1755
Etienne Martin	1755–1770
Charles-Louis Jouenne	1770–1793
Nicolas-Richard Jouenne	1770–1793

===== Lisieux =====
Guillaume Dubut	active in 1440

===== Orbec =====
Pierre Barbon	1735–1742
Nicolas Férey	active in 1742
Nicolas Férey	1742–1754
Charles Lacaille	1754–1760

===== Pont-l'Évêque =====
Thomas Lacaille	1725–1731
Charles Lacaille	1731–1754
Michel-Jean Martin	1787–1793

===== Vire =====
François Férey	active in 1725

==== Manche (50) ====
===== Avranches =====
Lubin Vallet	1717–1719
Joseph Morin	active in 1719

===== Coutances =====
Jean Gerbault	active in 1589
Mathurin Vallet	1682–1710
Lubin Vallet	1710–1717
François Férey	1717
Charles Morin	1717–1727
Nicolas-François Férey	1750–1760
Charles-Jean-Baptiste Sénéchal	1760–1761
Charles-Lubin Jouënne	1761–1775
Charles-Louis Jouënne	1775–1794
Charles Lacaille	1794–1807
François-Lubin Desmorest	1807–1849

===== Saint-Lô =====
Pierre Martin	1730–1739
Étienne Martin	1739–1755
Pierre Martin	1739–1770
Maurice Lantier	active in 1789

==== Orne (61) ====
===== Alençon =====
François Corneillet	1718–1731
Michel-Louis Bouëtard	active in 1731
Jacques-Michel Bouëtard	1774–1793
Michel Bouëtard	1774–1793
Pierre-Denis Ganié	1793–1810
Louis Filliaux	1810–1821
Joseph Ganié	1821–1849

===== Bellême =====
Mortagne-au-Perche

===== Mortagne-au-Perche =====
Nicolas Durand	1730–1738
Michel Durand	1738–1741
Jean-Joseph Durand	1738–1786
Michel Durand	1780–1786
Pierre-Denis Ganié	1786–1793
Nicolas-Lubin Jouenne	1786–1788

=== Bourgogne ===
==== Côte-d'Or (21) ====
===== Beaune =====
Pierre Minard	active in 1574
Morlot	active in 1575
Damien Tombereau	active in 1582
Jean Pancquotet	active in 1584

===== Dijon =====
Jean Blaigny	1416–1417
Arny Signart	active in 1430
Étienne Poisson	1465–1470
Jean Larmite	1470–1473
Jean Dupoix	1473–1478
Jean Minot	1478–1487
Thomas Regnault	1487–1490
Joseph Blanchet	1487–1490
Jean Alory	1490–1493
Jean Blanleu	1493–1520
Jean Beurey	1520–1524
Vincent Rapeneaul	1524–1536
Pierre Berbier	1536–1538
Pierre Dufresne	1538–1545
Sylvestre Champonnet	1545–1546
Jacques Silvestre	1546–1558
Hilaire Benoist	1558–1568
Claude Tussault	1568–1572
Pierre Fleuriet	1572–1593
Claude Chrétien	1607–1611
Jacques Brun	1610–1611
Jean Chrétien	1611–1615
Simon Grandjean	1615–1625 (lynched together with his wife in the end of a botched beheading)
Gaspard Perrier	1637–1647
Perrot-Morisot	1647–1660
Jacques Champion	1660–1671
Antoine Petit	1671–1680
Jacques Drouot	1680–1695
Matthieu Champion	1695–1698
Nicolas Vallot	1698–1710
Jean Champion	1710–1720
Jean Griveau	1720–1724
Joeph Gerboin	1724–1729
Pierre Champion	1729–1741
Martin Chefdeville	1741–1745
Martin Millot	1745–1748
François Montagne	1748–1759
Claude-Laurent Chrétien	1759–1763
François Chefdeville	1763–1794
Nicolas-François Férey	1794–1797
Louis-Gabriel Bellat	1797
Philibert-Joseph Vermeille	1797–1799
Paul Martinet	1799–1801
Louis-Charles-Martin Sanson	1801–1808
Louis-Antoine-Stanislas Desmorest	1808–1823
Joseph-Antoine Deibler	1823–1827
Charles-Louis Lacaille	1827–1839
François-Joseph Desmorest	1839
Dominique Martinet	1839–1841
Henri-Charles Desmorest	1841
Nicolas Chtarque	1841–1844
François Étienne	1844–1870

===== Semur-en-Auxois =====
Gaspard Perrier	1630–1637

==== Nièvre (58) ====
===== Nevers =====
Jean Chasteau	active in 1522
Jean de Norry	1668–1677
Georges Brunet	1677–1710
Pierre Bellin	1710–1712
Gabriel Amariton	1712–1721
Jean Bodin	1743–1750
Louis Remon	1750–1752
Pierre Gilles	1752–1760
Joseph Tisserand	1760–1761
Jean Tisserand	1761–1805
Laurent Pourra	1805–1815
François Étienne	1815–1835
François Étienne	1835–1843
Antoine Étienne	1843–1845
? Palle	1845–1849

==== Saône-et-Loire (71) ====
===== Autun =====
Jacques Brun	active in 1610

===== Châlon-sur-Saône =====
Jacques Quantin	c. 1645
Matthieu Champion	1690–1695
Pierre Champion	1695–1721
François Champion	1721–1745
Pierre Champion	1745–1750
Pierre Henry	1750–1762
Lafrance	1762–1764
Claude-Laurent Chrétien	1764–1770
Quentin Brochard	1770–1793
Claude-Antoine Chrétien	1793–1804
François-Joseph Heidenreich	c. 1806

===== Mâcon =====
Denis Gromon	active in 1610
Jean Thévenet	active in 1714

==== Yonne (89) ====
===== Auxerre =====
Claude Martigny	c. 1600–1610
Joseph Gerboin	1716–1717
Jean Hérisson	1717–1733
Jean Brochard	1733–1758
Nicolas Brochard	1758–1787
Henri Bickler	1787–1807
Louis-Antoine-Stanislas Desmorest	1807–1808
Louis-Charles-Martin Sanson	1808–1812
Pierre-Nicolas Jouenne	1812–1822
Pierre-Joseph Doubleau	1822–1849

===== Sens =====
Jean Le Nain	1577–1580
Claude Nignet	active in 1598
Jean Doubleau	1660–1680
Pierre Doubleau	1680–1715
Charles Brochard	1715–1722
Nicolas Brochard	1722–1727
Pierre Daucourt	1727–1732
Jacques Tisserand	1732–1734
Joseph Doubleau	1734–1746
Jean Brochard	1746–1758
Jean-Charles Brochard	1758–1793

=== Bretagne ===
==== Côtes-d'Armor (22; Côtes-du-Nord before 1990) ====
===== Saint-Brieuc =====
Charles-Lubin Lacaille	1792–1822
Auguste Gassouin	1822–1840
Charles-Marie-Louis Lacaille	1840–1842
Jacques-Henri Ganié	1842–1845
Joseph Ganié	1845–1853

==== Finistère (29) ====
===== Quimper =====
Jacques Le Glaouer	1712–1759
Jean Le Glaouer	1759–1773
Maurice Le Glaouer	1773–1793
Hervé Le Glaouer	1793–1804
François Lacaille	1804–1805
Paul Miraucourt	1805
Georges Miraucourt	1805–1807
Hervé-Joseph Le Glaouer	1807–1815
Jean-Baptiste Michel	1815–1817
Laurent Rhein	1817–1821
Germain Benoist	1821–1823
Claude-François Desmorest	1823–1849

==== Ille-et-Vilaine (35) ====
===== Rennes =====
Cousinet	c. 1617
Étienne Normandeau	1700–1723
Jean Verdier	1723–1730
Jacques Ganié	1730–1752
François-Thomas Férey	1752–1757
Jacques-Joseph Ganié	1757–1786
François-Joseph Férey	1786–1792
Gabriel-Joseph Dupuy	1792–1815
Henri Bickler	1815–1852
Jean-Emile Grosholtz	1852–1853
Joseph-Antoine Deibler	1853–1863
Louis-Antoine-Stanislas Deibler	1863–1871 (after 1871 the executioner of the republic in Paris)

==== Morbihan (56) ====
===== Vannes =====
François Guay	active in 1653
Pierre Tillard	active in 1657
Gervais Judic	active in 1686
François Guay	active in 1693
Jean Verdier	active in 1686
Pierre Ganié	active in 1736
Jacques Verdier	1752–1753
François Prudhomme	1753–1764
Jean Verdier	1764–1770
Charles-François Prudhomme	1770–1777
Louis-François Prudhomme	1777–1779
Charles-François Prudhomme	1777–1813
Charles-Louis Prudhomme	1777–1813
François Ganié	1841–1849

=== Centre-Val de Loire (Centre before 2015) ===
==== Cher (18) ====
===== Bourges =====
Pierre Mayet	1656–1662
Blaise Thiéry	1662–1681
Michel de Larousse	1681–1690
Jean Bessois	1690–1699
Jean Brunet	1699–1707
Michel Brunet	1707–1719
François Adam	1719–1739
Charles Esnault	1739–1742
Pierre Desfourneaux	1742–1769
Jacques Desfourneaux	1769–1779
François Desfourneaux	1779–1788
Ulrich Fischer	1788–1829
Pierre-Etienne Fischer	1829–1841
Christophe-Henri Desmorest	1841–1849

===== Vierzon =====
Georges Aurillault	1624–1627
Claude Aurillault	1627–1635
Hubert Bouard	1636–1691
Jean de Larousse	1691–1696
Claude Esnault	1696–1698
Charles Esnault	1698–1706
Jean Desfourneaux	1706–1747
Jean Desfourneaux	1747–1755
François Desfourneaux	1755–1792

==== Eure-et-Loir (28) ====
===== Bonneval =====
Robert Divray	active in 1584

===== Chartres =====
Robert Beaufils	active in 1581
Jean Baudry	c. 1600
Lubin Baudry	1604–1627
Lubin Baudry	1627–1647
Pierre Corneillet	1647–1657
Nicolas Le Vavasseur	1672–1681
Antoine-François Deville	1781–1808
François-Eloi Deville	1808–1826
Jean-Eloi Deville	1826–1846
Henri-François Deville	1846–1849

===== Châteaudun =====
Guillaume Artus	1496–1497
Jacques Fulbert	1556–1557
Yves Tontonnay	active in 1564
Jacques Guictray	1577–1580
Joachim Guictray	1582–1584
Michel Leliepvre	1602–1616
Jacques Landeau	1625–1629
Laurent Landeau	1629–1651
Louis Landeau	1651–1663
Nicolas Brunet	1663–1686
Claude Esnault	1686–1691
François Tardiveau	1691–1714
Aignan Proust	1714–1744
Jean-Baptiste Proust	1744–1772
Nicolas-Jean-Baptiste Étienne	1772–1793

==== Indre (36) ====
===== Châteauroux =====
Pierre Desfourneaux	1792–1834
Jacques Cané	1834–1849 (last name also rendered as Canin)
François-Joseph Desmorest	active in 1837

===== Issoudun =====
Charles Esnault	1706–1718
Matthieu de Larousse	1718–1735
Louis-Pierre Hébert	1735–1749
Gilbert-Matthieu de Larousse	1749–1752
Louis-Charles Hébert	1749–1752
Charles-François de Vallereau	1752–1760
François Desfourneaux	1760–1792

==== Indre-et-Loire (37) ====
===== Amboise =====
Jacques Berger	1690–1722
Jacques Berger	1722–1744
Martin Berger	1744–1760
Gilles-François-Nicolas-Martin Berger	1783–1793

===== Chinon =====
René Condenay	1680–1700
Jean Condenay	1700–1711
Louis Duchesne	1711–1718
Michel Clément	1718–1720
Louis Ayrault	1720–1730
Etienne Robert	1730–1735
Jacques-Bernard Lefébure	1735–1738
Gilles Férey	1738–1753
Jean-Louis Ayrault	1762–1783
Gilles-François Berger	1783–1793

===== L'Île-Bouchard =====
see: Chinon

===== Loches =====
Étienne-Louis Normandeau	1730–1740
Jean Bodin	1740–1743
Vincent Jamet	1743–1754
Jean-Louis Ayrault	1754–1758
Quentin Brochard	1762–1770
Claude-Henri Chrétien	1772–1789
François-Claude Chrétien	1789–1793

===== Tours =====
Denis	1461–1488
Jacques Lefébure	1640–1654
François Berger	1654–1690
Jacques Berger	1690–1722
Antoine Berger	1722–1744
Gilles-François-Nicolas Berger	1744–1768
Louis-Charles-Martin Sanson	1768–1795
Pierre-François-Etienne Desmorest	1795–1830
François-Louis-Henri Desmorest	1830–1849

==== Loir-et-Cher (41) ====
===== Blois =====
Guillaume Guillard	1373–1374
Laurent Robert	c. 1600
Blaise Robert	1609–1649
Jean Robert	1649–1665
Louis Robert	1665–1667
Nicolas Esnault	1667–1698
Jean Berger	1698–1710
Jean Berger	1710–1718
Jean de Larousse	1718–1721
François Trémont	1721–1761
Pierre-André-Louis Desmorest	active in 1761
Joseph Doubleau	1761–1795
Nicolas-Charles-Gabriel Sanson	1795–1799
Joseph Doubleau	1799–1800
Charles-Louis Férey	1800–1826
André-Louis Férey	1826–1832
Charles-François Desfourneaux	1832–1849

===== Romorantin-Lanthenay =====
Louis Landeau	1655–1663

===== Vendôme =====
Guillaume Landeau	1600–1629
Jacques Landeau	1629–1640
Louis Landeau	1640–1692
Pierre Trémont	1692–1747
Henri-Pierre Trémont	1747–1756
François Brunet	1756–1775
François Montagne	1775–1793

==== Loiret (45) ====
===== Gien =====
Louis Macé	1582–1583
Charles Brochard	1715–1722
Jean Brochard	1722–1745
Pierre Tapetoux	1745–1789
Nicolas-Jean-Baptiste Étienne	1789–1793

===== Montargis =====
Joseph Gerboin	1704–1717
Georges Hérisson	1717–1718
Jean Berger	1718–1720
Jean Hérisson	1720–1727
René Berger	1727–1733
Louis-François Hébert	1797–1801

===== Orléans =====
Pierre Robert	c. 1430
Jean Legros	c. 1600
Matthieu Legros	active in 1627
Simon Boudineau	1648–1656
Jacques Leroy	1656–1658
Nicolas Martinot	1658–1670
Louis Tardiveau	1670–1699
Jean Desmorest	1699–1700
Louis Tardiveau	1700–1707
Michel Tardiveau	1707–1715
Henri Tardiveau	1715–1735
François Tardiveau	1735–1736
Aignan Proust	1736–1740
Nicolas Berger	1740–1758
Henri-Alexis Tardiveau	1758–1771
Pierre-François Étienne	1771–1789
Charles-François Férey	1789–1820
Gabriel-Auguste Desmorest	1820–1870

=== Champagne-Ardenne ===
==== Ardennes (08) ====
===== Sedan =====
Pierre Barbier	1690–1722
Pierre Barbier	1722–1727
Jean Barbier	1727–1731
Simon Barbier	1731
Pierre Barbier	1731–1773
Simon Barbier	1773–1779
Jean-François Barbier	1779–1828
Pierre Barbier	1779–1828
François Barbier	1828–1841
Philippe Wolff	1841–1842
Christophe Reine	1842–1849 (his last name also appears as Rhein)

==== Aube (10) ====
===== Troyes =====
Guillaume	active in 1432
Maigret	active in 1571
Maxime Doublot	1710–1715
Nicolas L'Arné	1715–1729
Antoine Doublot	1729–1736
Hubert Doublot	1736–1750
Jean Doublot	1750–1761
François Blondeau	1761–1770
Jean-Baptiste Doublot	1770–1787
Louis-Michel Olivier	1787–1823
Joseph-Nicolas Fauconnier	1823–1841

==== Marne (51) ====
===== Châlons-en-Champagne =====
Louis Saffret	1606–1628
Séverin Saffret	1628–1632
Pierre Lévesque	1632–1638
Louis Saffret	1638–1643
Jean Saffret	1667–1679
Jacques Jean	1679–1688
Jacques Michelin	1688–1702
Pierre Daniel	1702–1709
Nicolas Desmorest	1709–1730
Simon Desmorest	1730–1742
Jean Desmorest	1742–1777
Jean-Baptiste Desmorest	1777–1780
Jean-Simon Desmorest	1780–1793

===== Chatillon-sur-Marne =====
Simon Jean	1770–1780
Simon-Hippolyte Desmorest	1780–1788

===== Épernay =====
Claude Belleville	active in 1629
Antoine Guibourg	1683–1702
Simon Hébert	1702–1730
Charles Jouënne	1730–1736
Martin Jean	1736–1740
Simon Jean	1740–1752
François-Hippolyte Desmorest	1752–1788
Simon-Hippolyte Desmorest	1788–1793

===== Reims =====
Pierre Lormant	active in 1684
Charles Michelin	1692–1698
Pierre Daniel	1698–1702
Pierre Daniel	1723–1726
Charles-François Jouenne	1726–1735
Pierre Daniel	1735–1738
Louis-Adam Hébert	1738–1743
Jean-Louis Hébert	1743–1744
Nicolas-Charles-Gabriel Sanson	1744–1770
Jean-Louis Sanson	1770–1793
Jean-Simon Desmorest	1793–1798
Jean-Louis Desmorest	1798–1828
François-Louis Desmorest	1828–1853

===== Vitry-le-François =====
Louis Saffret	active in 1628
Louis Saffret	active in 1688
Jean-Baptiste Barré	1688–1693
Jacques Jean	1693–1725
Martin Jean	1725–1733
Louis Guitton	1733–1743
Jean-Pierre-Henri Dalembourg	1743–1745
Nicolas Dalembourg	1745–1747
Jean-Baptiste Desmorest	1747–1774
Jean-Baptiste Desmorest	1774–1793

==== Haute-Marne (52) ====
===== Bourmont =====
Jean Chrétien	1731–1735
Claude Bour	1735–1737
Léopold Bour	1737–1771
Claude-Charles Bour	1771–1793

===== Chaumont =====
Pierre Daucourt	1693–1732
Jean Gueldre	1732–1760
Henri Gueldre	1760–1805
Nicolas Cané	1805–1825
François Cané	1825–1835

===== Langres =====
Simon Grandjean	active in 1615
Rémi Henry	1717–1721
Michel Henry	1721–1729
Robert Daucort	1729–1732
Joseph Tisserand	1732–1757
Claude-Michel Chrétien	1757–1793

=== Corse ===
With a four-year delay in 1875 also Corsica was integrated into the area of the executioner of the republic's activity; see: Monsieur de Paris For the different department numbers, before 1976 Corsica used to be one department only and was codenumbered with 20 by then.

==== Corse-du-Sud (2A) ====
===== Ajaccio =====
René Giudici	1799–1800 (his last name is also rendered as René Jugé)
Jean-François Hermann	1803–1804
Bernardin Porro	1804–1806
Dominique Paglia	1806–1808
Antoine Vollmar	1808–1809
Jean Peyrussian	1809–1812

==== Haute-Corse (2B) ====
===== Bastia =====
Jean-Pierre Combé	1805–1809
François Étienne	1809–1813
Louis Simaliot	1813–1826
Jean-Baptiste Simaliot	1826–1840
Michel Porro	1840–1851
Antoine-François-Balthazar Porro	1851–1852
Louis-Marie Douran	1852–1853
Vincent Bornacini	1853
Louis-Henri Desmorest	1853–1873/74
Désiré Herman	1873/74–1875

=== Franche-Comté ===
==== Doubs (25) ====
===== Besançon =====
Jean-Jacques Karpf	active in 1718
Nicolas-François Dupuy	1762–1765
Claude-Antoine Chrétien	1765–1794
Nicolas Hermann	1794–1809
François Étienne	1809
Jean-Pierre Urich	1809–1846
Jean-Georges Burck	1846–1849
François-Ferréol Pierrot	1849–1858
Jacques-Henri Ganié	1858–1862
Georges-Louis-Gustave Pierrot	1862–1870

===== Blamont =====
Joachim Fleurdelis	1685–1686
Joseph Denthe	1686–1695
Melchior Ginter	1754–1760/61

===== Montbéliard =====
Jacques Fleurdelis	1615–1627
Jacques Fleurdelis	1642–1670
Jean Fleurdelis	1670–1680
Jacques Fleurdelis	1680–1700
Pierre Fleurdelis	1700–1729
Pierre Fleurdelis	1729–1749
Gaspard Boilley	1749–1768
Pierre Fleurdelis	1768–1793

==== Jura (39) ====
===== Dole =====
Désiré Giboz	1792–1794

===== Lons-le-Saunier =====
Désiré Giboz	1794–1803
Jean-Baptiste Cané	1803–1827
Germain Burck	1827–1838 (last name sometimes written Purgy)
François-Joseph Desmorest	1838–1849
Nicolas Roch	1849–1851 (last name also given as Rauch)

==== Haute-Saône (70) ====
===== Vesoul =====
Claude-Laurent Chrétien	1793–1805
Nicolas Pierrot	1805–1823
François-Ferréol Pierrot	1823–1849

==== Territoire de Belfort (90) ====
===== Belfort =====
Joseph Comte	c. 1650
Joseph Comte	1668–1726
Nicolas-Antoine Comte	1726–1739
Jean-Pierre Comte	1739–1780
Jean-Pierre-Nicolas Comte	1780–1793

===== Faverois =====
Pancrace	1648–1656
Jean Fleury	active in 1665
Laurent Lacour	1665–1672
Martin Lacour	1672–1674
Ehrard Lacour	1682–1716
Jean-Georges Lacour	1716–1739
Jean-Georges Reichlin	1739–1752
Jean-Georges Lacour	1752–1793

===== Grandvillars =====
Joachim Comte	1673–1725
Jean-François Comte	1725–1744
Jean Fleurdelis	1744–1781

===== Montreux =====
Jacques Denthe	c. 1670–1674
Jean-Georges Denthe	1674–1725

=== Haute-Normandie ===
==== Eure (27) ====
===== Évreux =====
Robert Le Vavasseur	1598–1618
Etienne Le Vavasseur	1626–1649
Louis Le Vavasseur	1649–1658
François Le Vavasseur	1675–1681
Nicolas Le Vavasseur	1681–1687
Lubin Jouenne	1687–1700
Lubin Jouenne	1720–1725
Louis Jouenne	1725–1737
Jean-Baptiste Sénéchal	1725–1737
Nicolas-Louis Jouenne	1737–1750
Nicolas-Lubin Jouenne	1737–1758
Nicolas-Louis Jouenne	1758–1780
Nicolas-Louis Jouenne	1784–1802
André-Thomas Férey	1810–1824
Amand Leroy	1824–1844
Louis-Marie-Dauphin Benoist	1844
Raymond Peyrussan	1844–1846
Louis-Julien-Fortuné Leroy	1846–1849

===== Gisors =====
Jean-Baptiste Carlier	1712–1733
Georges Carlier	1733–1741
Michel Durand	1741–1765
Jean-Louis Olivier	1765–1794

===== Pont-Audemer =====
Lubin Jouenne	1700–1722
Lubin Vallet	1722–1727
François Férey	1727–1735
Nicolas Férey	1735–1738
François Férey	1738–1742
François-Charles-Gabriel Férey	1742–1769
Maixent-François Férey	1769–1785
François-Joseph Férey	1769–1791

==== Seine-Maritime (76) ====
===== Caudebec-en-Caux =====
Nicolas Jouenne	active in 1202 (last name also given as Jouhanne)
? Jouenne	mentioned in 1380–1384 (last name also given as Jouhanne, nicknamed "Jouhanne-Justice)
Martin Lecupeur	1384–1409
? Marescot	c. 1450
Robin Jouenne	active in 1460
Guillaume Jouenne	active in 1507
Pierre Jouenne	active in 1675
? Dumontier	active in 1706–1710
Jacques Dubourg	1710–1713
Charles Dubourg	1713–1719
Martin Rossignol	1719–1723
Nicolas-François Damonville	1723–1738
Nicolas Férey	1738–1742
François-Thomas Férey	1742–1770
Charles Férey	1742–1770
Charles-Lubin Jouenne	1770–1776
Nicolas-Richard Jouenne	1776–1787
Michel-Jean Leroy	1787–1793

===== Dièppe =====
Pierre Jouenne	−1662 (last name also referred to as Juoanne)
Charles Sanson	1662-
Pierre Jouenne	active in 1675 (last name also referred to as Juoanne)
Nicolas Férey	active in 1738
Charles Jouenne	active in 1780

===== Rouen =====
Simon Dailly	c. 1400
Geoffroy Thérage	1406/07–1432 (or after; executed Jeanne d'Arc; last name also rendered as Thiérache)
Pierre Lecomte	active in 1607
Pierre Jouenne	1660–1681
Guillaume Malloeuvre	1681–1688
Nicolas Le Vavasseur	1688–1694
Martin Le Vavasseur	1694–1703
Jean-Baptiste Morin	1703–1704
Lubin Jouenne	1704–1724
Jean-Baptiste Sénéchal	1724–1725
Nicolas Férey	1725–1735
Charles Férey	1735–1796
Nicolas-François Férey	1735–1750
François-Thomas Férey	1735–1782
Charles-André-Louis Férey	1796–1811
Charles-André Férey	1811–1847
Jean-François Heidenreich	1847–1848
? Rhein	1848–1870

=== Île-de-France ===
==== Paris (75) ====
===== Prévoté de l'Hôtel du Roi =====
Etienne Lebré	active in 1417
Fleurant	– 1516
Macé	active in 1523
Jean Guillaume	1590–1594
Denis Corneillet	1594–1616
Henriet Cousin	mid-17th century
Oudet Barré	1653–1671

===== Prévoté de Paris =====
Thévenot	1278–1320 (last name also given as Estevenot)
Nicolas	1322–1358
Colart Provignon	1358 or after – c. 1380 or before
Pierre Dupré	c. 1380 – c. 1400, active in 1383 (last name also written as du Pré)
Geoffroy	1407–1411/13 (name also appears as Guieffroy)
Capeluche	1411/13–1418 (before being executed in 1418 or 1419, Capeluche trained his executioner himself)
Jean Tiphaine	active in 1418
Colin Foucher	active in 1445
Henri Cousin	1460 – before 1477
Jean Cousin	– 1477
Pierre Philippart	c. 1478
Tristan	active in 1484
Jacques Dulac	active in 1502
Robin Serre	active in 1507
Jacquet	1507
Florent Bazard	1507–1516 (his last name also appears as Bazart; lynched after a botched execution)
Rotillon	1516–1529
Pierre Pommerelle	1529-?
Macé	1543–1553
Jean Rozeau	1555/58–1594
Jean Guillaume	1594–1620
Jean Guillaume	1620–1666
François Guillaume	1666–1672
Antoine de France	1672–1674
André Guillaume	1674–1682
Jean Carlié	1682–1687
Nicolas Levasseur	1687–1688 (his last name also appears as Le Vavasseur)
Charles-Louis Sanson	1688–1699 (de facto) / 1703 (official)
Charles Sanson	1699 (de facto)/1707 (official) – 1726
François Prudhomme	1726–1739 (interim executioner)
Charles-Jean-Baptiste Sanson	26 (official)/1739 (de facto)–1754 (de facto)/1766/1778 (official)
Charles-Henri Sanson	1754 (de facto)/1766/1778 (official) – 1795 (de facto)/1804 (official)
Henri Sanson	1795 (de facto)/1804 (official) – 1840
Henry-Clément Sanson	1840–1847 (he was an inveterate abolitionist)
Charles-André Férey	1847–1849
Jean-François Heidenreich	1849–1871

==== Seine-et-Marne (77) ====
===== Meaux =====
Pierre Corneillet	1648–1660
André Guillaume	1660–1665
Denis Barré	1665–1680
Louis Hébert	1680–1709
Pierre Daniel	1709–1723
Louis-François Hébert	1723–1724
Louis-Adam Hébert	1724–1738
Jean-Louis Hébert	1738–1743
Louis-Adam Hébert	1743–1761
Louis-Adam Hébert	1761–1770
Jean-Louis Hébert	1770–1793

===== Melun =====
Jean Hérisson	c. 1765–1787
Georges Hérisson	1687–1716
Georges Hérisson	1716–1721
Georges-René Hérisson	1721–1723
Georges Hérisson	1723–1727
Antoine-Pierre Dubut	1727
Jean Hérisson	1727–1746
Pierre Hérisson	1746–1787
Pierre-André-Louis Desmorest	1787–1788
Nicolas-Lubin Jouenne	1788–1826
Nicolas-Placide Doubleau	1826–1849

===== Provins =====
Robert Sénécart	−1571
Jean Hérisson	1740–1742
Jean Pichon	1742–1762
Jean-Rémi Pichon	1762–1768
Louis-Cyr-Charlemagne Sanson	1768–1789
André-Thomas Férey	1789–1793

==== Yvelines (78) ====
===== Mantes =====
Michel Le Vavasseur	1625–1631
Jean Bouëtard	active in 1689
Nicolas Le Marchand	1689–1722
Nicolas Le Marchand	1722–1737
Nicolas-Charles-Gabriel Le Marchand	1737–1755
Michel Durand	1755–1780
Louis-Michel Olivier	1780–1788
Pierre-André-Louis Olivier	1780–1793

===== Meulan =====
see: Mantes

===== Montfort-l'Amaury =====
Jean Bouëtard	c. 1670

===== Versailles (Prévoté de l'Hôtel du Roi) =====
Robert Anise	1671–1680
Robert Le Marchand	1680–1690
Jean Carlier	1690–1733
François Prudhomme	1733–1749
Nicolas-Charles-Gabriel Sanson	1749–1778
Charles-Henri Sanson	1778–1788
Louis-Cyr-Charlemagne Sanson	1788–1794

===== Prévôté de Versailles =====
Louis-Jean Dupuy	1794–1795
Jean Boursier	1795–1808
François-Nicolas Férey	1808–1817
Jean-Baptiste Scarron	1817–1819
Germain Benoist	1819–1821
Laurent Rhein	1821–1846
Jean-Henri Rhein	1846–1849

==== Essonne (91) ====
===== Dourdan =====
see: Étampes

===== Étampes =====
Léonard Leprince	1549–1556
David Devoire	1598–1623
Jean Duchamp	active in 1641
Jean Berger	1662–1677
François Berger	1677–1694
André-Louis Desmorest	1694–1740
André-Louis Desmorest	1740–1763
Pierre-André-Louis Desmorest	1763–1793

===== La Ferté-Alais =====
see: Étampes

==== Hauts-de-Seine 92 ====
No local executioner known so far

==== Seine-Saint-Denis (93) ====
No local executioner known so far

==== Val-de-Marne (94) ====
No local executioner known so far

==== Val-d'Oise (95) ====
===== Pontoise =====
Jean-Baptiste Carlier	1699–1712
Jean-Baptiste Carlier	1712–1732
Jean-Baptiste Carlier	1732–1742
Jean-Baptiste-François Carlier	en 1742–1782
Jean-Baptiste-François Carlier	1782–1793

=== Languedoc-Roussillon ===
==== Aude (11) ====
===== Carcassonne =====
Pierre de Lafont	active in 1538
Jean Lapeyre	1545–1561
André	1561–1566
Jean Maigre	1566–1580
Jean Roizat	1580
Jean Sesherbe	1580–1593
Antoine Faret	1593–1594
Jacques de Laplanche	1594–1600
Benoît Libès	1600
Antoine Ferrier	1600–1603
Jean Bon	1603
Gaillard Bourd	1603–1610
Bernard Dauriac	c. 1640
Pierre Puech	c. 1645–1650 (his last name also appears as Pech)
Antoine Bourset	active in 1719
Bernardin Blaize	1770–1786
Pierre Blanc	1786–1793
Etienne-Victor Rives	1793
? Roch	1793 (interim executioner; his last name also appears as Rauch)
François Berger	1793 (interim; executioner of Tarbes)
Jean-Philibert Ginier	1793–1795
Pierre Chevalier	1795–1801
François Berger	1801–1804
Jean-François-Philibert Robineau	1804–1823
Laurent-Denis Robineau	1823–1827
Philibert-Godefroy Robineau	1827–1840
Georges Miraucourt	1840–1849

===== Castelnaudary =====
Jean Vernhet	1522–1538
Antoine Ferrier	1579–1589
Jean Boussac	active in 1619

===== Limoux =====
Antoine Blanc	1572–1578
Jean Cronhac	1578–1582
Guillaume Teissère	1582–1584
Jean Sesherbe	1584–1585 (interim; executioner of Carcassonne)
Jean Jacmes	1585–1603
Antoine Ferrier	1603–?

===== Narbonne =====
Guillaume Teissère	1567–1570

==== Gard (30) ====
===== Nîmes =====
Barthélémy Querol	1573–1589
Jean Cabrière	1590–1611
Jean Arman	active in 1646
Victor Deltet	1775–1780
Marcelin Berthoumier	1791–1792 (interim; executioner of Montpellier)
Dominique Vassalo	1792–1795
François-Louis-Hippolyte Desmorest	1795–1814
Jean-Baptiste Desmorest	1814–1816
Pierre-Vivien Debost	1816–1830
Jean-Nicolas Cané	1830–1853
Martin-Pierre-Joseph Berger	1853–1870

==== Hérault (34) ====
===== Montpellier =====
Jacques Thiesame	active in 1460
André Bonissi	c. 1470
François Lacombe	active in 1585
Claude Bausillon	c. 1610
Pierre Arnaud	1624–1628
Étienne Roquefort	active in 1645
Pierre Gineste	active in 1657
Marcelin Berthoumier	1791–1794
Barthélémy Mauvin	1794–1795
Jean Boursier	active in 1795
Gilles-François-Nicolas-Martin Berger	1795–1799
Nicolas-Charles-Gabriel Sanson	1799–1800
Louis-Victor Sanson	1800–1802
Pierre-Joseph Vermeille	1802–1808
Jean-Baptiste Desmorest	1808–1811
François Guillot	1811–1818
Antoine Guillot	1818–1825
Jean-Pierre Guillot	1825–1832
Léonard Richim	1832–1833
Joseph-Louis Claret	1833–1860
Auguste-Paul Roch	1860–1870 (his last name also appears as Rauch)

==== Lozère (48) ====
===== Mende =====
Gilles-François-Nicolas-Martin Berger	Active in 1794
Jean-Pierre Boitquin	1799–1801
Jean-Pierre Roch	1801 (last name sometimes written as Rauch)
Nicolas Cané	1801–1805
François Roch	1805–1848 (last name sometimes written as Rauch)

==== Pyrénées-Orientales (66) ====
===== Perpignan =====
Jacques del Arnau	1682–1687
Carrera	1688–1699
Traginer	1700–1709
Raphaël del Arnau	1711–1723
Simon Grio	active in 1724
Antoine Denis	1733–1734
Nicolas-Alexis Montagne	1772–1779
Claude Thouvenin	1779–1782
Jean Camille	1782–1791
Bernardin Blaize	active in 1791
Antoine Varennes	1791–1793
Jean Crossy	1793–1797
Jean-François-Philibert Robineau	1797–1798
Jean-Pierre Bickler	1818–1819
Laurent Bickler	1819–1839
Martin-Pierre-Joseph Berger	1839–1850

=== Limousin ===
==== Corrèze (19) ====
===== Brive-la-Gaillarde =====
Bernard Varennes	1720s–1730s
Michel Benoist	1756–1788
Aureil Mendé	1788–1793

===== Tulle =====
Jean Gumond	active in 1761
François Benoist	1789–1804
Valentin Grosholtz	1804–1820
Louis Grosholtz	1820–1823
Jean Grosholtz	1823–1849

==== Creuse (23) ====
===== Guéret =====
Léonard Chanton	active in 1715
Jean-Pierre François	1783–1786
Pierre-Etienne François	1786–1798
François-Joseph Férey	1798–1808
Pierre-Jacques Nord	1808–1849

==== Haute-Vienne 87 ====
===== Limoges =====
Louis Vivien	1792–1798
Louis Gendron	1716–1720
Pierre Chaussonnier	1720–1725
Pierre Pradel	1798–1802
Antoine Hiezely	1802–1826
Louis Hiezely	1826–1848
Nicolas Hiezely	1848–1849
Nicolas Grosholtz	1849–1853
François-Louis-Henri Desmorest	1853–1870

=== Lorraine ===
==== Meurthe-et-Moselle (54) ====
===== Baccarat =====
François-Joseph Hiezely	1719–1739
Jean-Michel Hiezely	1739–1777
Georges-Antoine Hiezely	1777–1793

===== Badonviller =====
Bernard Eisenhuet	active in 1598
Marc Hausser	1603–1604
Jean-Nicolas Laury	1685–1686
Georges Hiezely	1722–1732
Claude-Antoine Hiezely	1732–1762
Jean-Pierre Chrétien	1777–1793

===== Bauzemont =====
Pierre Courtois	1712–1748
Jean-François Courtois	1748–1763
Nicolas Thouvenin	1763–1772
Jean-François Courtois	1772–1793

===== Bayon =====
Charles Magnard	active in 1691
Jean-François Courtois	1730–1740
Dominique Courtois	1758–1779
Joseph-François Wolff	1779–1793

===== Blâmont =====
Georges Hiezely	1719–1722
Nicolas Parisot	1722–1754
Jean-Jacques Hermann	1761–1783
Jean-François Hermann	1783–1790
Jean-Nicolas Fixard	1790–1793

===== Briey =====
Jean Schweitzer	active in 1675
Jean-Léonard Henry	1701–1711
Bernard Back	1711–1725
Jean-Pierre Dillenburg	1725–1733
Jean-Baptiste Dillenburg	1733–1752
Jean-Pierre Thiéry	1752–1754
Jean-Baptiste Dillenburg	1754–1761
Jean-Antoine Roch	1761–1793 (last name also given as Rauch)

===== Conflans-en-Jarnisy =====
Henri Labille	1717–1735
Louis Thomas	1735–1736
Jean-Pierre Thiéry	1736–1750
Laurent Viard	1750–1793

===== Deneuvre =====
see: Baccarat

===== Domjevin =====
see: Bauzemont

===== Einville-au-Jard =====
Jean-Pierre Duval	1743–1758
Jean Cané	1758–1790
Jean-Baptiste-Oswald Cané	1790–1793

===== Foug =====
see: Commercy, Meuse (55)

===== Gerbéviller =====
Pierre Wolff	1743–1778
François Wolff	1778–1793

===== Haraucourt =====
see: Einville-au-Jard

===== Harbouey =====
see: Blâmont

===== Longuyon =====
Corneille Back	1710–1715
Matthieu Labille	1715–1748
Jean Labille	1748–1792
Jean-Nicolas Cané	1772–1775
Jean Labille	1775–1777
Jean-Henri Labille	1777–1793

===== Longwy =====
Pierre Bour	1692–1693
Jean-Nicolas Back	1693–1701
Nicolas Klein	1701–1718
Jean Klein	1718–1752
Joseph Klein	1752–1761
Jean-Nicolas Roch	1761–1790 (last name also given as Rauch)
Jean-Pierre Roch	1790–1793 (last name also given as Rauch)

===== Lunéville =====
François Henry	1700–1713
Jean-Léonard Henry	1713–1720
Claude Duval	1720–1743
Jean-Pierre Duval	1743–1764
Jean-Nicolas Roch	1764–1766 (last name also appears as Rauch)
Marguerite Cané	1766–1784 (one of France's most long-termed female executioners)
Jean-François Hermann	1784–1793

===== Nancy =====
Jean-Georges Duval	1658–1680
Nicolas Suisse	1680–1684 (his last name also appears as Schweitzer)
Jean-Jacques Burckhard	1684–1705
Jean-Pierre Bour	1705–1718
Jean-Pierre Bour	1718–1730
Jacobé Rieger	1730–1732 (Jean-Pierre Bour's wife and after 1730 widow; one of the rare cases a woman was appointed)
François Roch	1732–1747 (Jacobé Rieger's new husband; his last name is also given as Rauch)
Jean-Pierre Rhein	1747–1758
Laurent Roch	1758–1779 (his last name is also given as Rauch)
Jean-Pierre Spirckel	1779–1799
Jean-Nicolas Roch	1799–1823 (his last name is also given as Rauch)
Nicolas Cané	1823–1847
Matthieu Spirckel	1847–1870

===== Nomény =====
see: Pont-à-Mousson

===== Norroy-le-Sec =====
Bernard Back	1715–1741
Claude Back	1741–1781
Jean-Baptiste Thiéry	1781–1793

===== Pont-à-Mousson =====
Goeury Pichon	active in 1709
Jean-Pierre Bickler	c. 1722
Christophe-Séraphin Bickler	1734–1757
Jean-Pierre Bickler	1757–1783
Christophe Bickler	1783–1793

===== Réchicourt-la-Petite =====
see: Blâmont

===== Saint-Clément =====
see: Baccarat

===== Saint-Nicolas-de-Port =====
Nicolas Valois	1650–1683
Rémi Karpf	active in 1720
Jean-Jacques Parisot	1716–1733
Jean-Philippe Rhein	1733–1762
François Rhein	1762–1776
Jean-Jacques Roch	1776–1793 (his last name is sometimes given as Rauch)

===== Sancy =====
Bernard Back	1715–1741
Claude Back	1741–1783
Jean-Nicolas Roch	1783–1793 (last name also written as Rauch)

===== Thézey-Saint-Martin =====
see: Delme at Moselle (57)

===== Thiaucourt (Thiaucourt-Regniéville) =====
see: Pont-à-Mousson

===== Toul =====
Claude Miraucourt	1670–1679
Claude Miraucourt	1692–1699
Antoine Hermann	1708–1714
Jean-Charles Valois	1714–1728
Jean-Georges Roch	1728–1748 (last name also given as Rauch)
François Roch	1748–1761 (last name also given as Rauch)
Laurent Bickler	1761–1776
François Roch	1776–1790 (last name also given as Rauch)
Nicolas Cané	1790–1793

===== Ville-sur-Yron =====
see: Conflans-en-Jarnisy

===== Villers-la-Montagne =====
Bernard Back	1725–1741
Matthieu Back	1741–1748
Jean-Nicolas Roch	1748–1772 (last name may also appear as Rauch)
Jean-Pierre-Laurent Roch	1772–1775 (last name may also appear as Rauch)
Laurent-Nicolas Roch	1775–1793 (last name may also appear as Rauch)

==== Meuse (55) ====
===== Arrancy-sur-Crusne =====
see: Longuyon at Meurthe-et-Moselle (54)

===== Avioth =====
Jean-Nicolas Labille	1720–1742
Jean-Pierre Labille	1742–1775
Michel Labille	1775–1793

===== Bar-le-Duc =====
Pierre Chapuzot	1630–1657
Claude Chapuzot	1667–1686
Jacques Chapuzot	active in 1696
Martin Castagnière	1708–1731
Jean-Conrad Rhein	1731–1752
Simon Jean	1752–1770
Jean-François Hiezely	1770–1776
Laurent Rhein	1777–1793

===== Billy-sous-Mangiennes =====
François François	1740–1759
Jean-Nicolas Cané	1759–1786
Jean-Louis Cané	1786–1793

===== Commercy =====
Jean-Nicolas Guerchoux	1746–1768
Louis Thomas	1768–1772
Jean-Pierre Roch	1772–1790 (last name also given as Rauch)
Nicolas Cané	1790–1793

===== Damvillers =====
Jean François	1706–1734
François François	1734–1768
Pierre-Etienne François	1768–1786
Paul François	1786–1793

===== Étain =====
Claude Suisse	1715–1719 (his last name also appears as Schweitzer)
Pierre Étienne	1719–1750
Jean-Pierre Thiéry	1750–1752
François Étienne	1752–1759
Jean-Pierre Thiéry	1759–1793

===== Fresnes-en-Woëvre =====
François-Edmé Duval	1684–1731
Jean Cané	1731–1740
Jean-Pierre Urich	1740–1745
Antoine-Martin Urich	1745–1779
Jean-Pierre Urich	1745–1786
Nicolas Thiéry	1786–1793

===== Herméville-en-Woëvre =====
François-Edmé Duval	1684–1726
Jean-Pierre Miraucourt	1726–1754
Paul Miraucourt	1754–1765
François Miraucourt	1765–1793

===== Marville =====
Jean-Nicolas Labille	1720–1748
Jean-Nicolas Labille	1748–1777
Michel Labille	1777–1793

===== Montmédy =====
Jean-Nicolas Labille	1720–1748
Jean Labille	1748–1787

===== Saint-Mihiel =====
Christophe-Séraphin Bickler	1722–1752
Jean-Pierre Thiéry	1752–1757
Jean-Pierre Bickler	1757–1766
Christophe Bickler	1766–1823
Simon-Hippolyte Desmorest	1823–1849

===== Verdun =====
Jean Gaultier	1532–1536
Jean Gaultier	active in 1575
Martin Jean	c. 1630
Jean Miraucourt	1640–1668
Nicolas Blin	1668–1679
Claude Miraucourt	1679–1708
Pierre Étienne	1708–1762
François Étienne	1762–1791
Antoine Étienne	1791–1793

==== Moselle (57) ====
===== Ancerville =====
Claude Guerchoux	1681–1710
Jean Guerchoux	1710–1758
Jean-Laurent Guerchoux	1758–1793

===== Angevillers =====
Hermann Roch	c. 1700 (last name also given as Rauch)
Simon Klein	1714–1730
Christophe-Séraphin Bickler	1722–1741
Jean-Nicolas Rauch	1741–1751 (last name also given as Rauch)
Jean Grauel	1774–1793

===== Ay-sur-Moselle =====
see: Buding

===== Bambiderstroff =====
see: Courcelles-sur-Nied

===== Béchy =====
Jean-Nicolas Back	1697–1701
Claude Guerchoux	1701–1710
Jean Guerchoux	1710–1722
François Guerchoux	1722–1780
Guillaume Back	1780–1793

===== Beux =====
see: Béchy

===== Bitche =====
see: Schorbach

===== Boulay =====
Nicolas Schweitzer	active in 1613
Christophe Schwartz	1618–1621
Jean-Jacques Rhein	1621–1663
Jean-Pierre Back	1663–1703
Jean-Georges Back	1703–1731
Jean-Pierre Wolff	1731–1786
Jean Wolff	1786–1787
Jean-Nicolas Wolff	1787–1793

===== Buding =====
Jean-Pierre Spirckel	1744–1787
Laurent Rauch	1787–1793

===== Budling =====
see: Buding

===== Château-Salins =====
Nicolas Godot	c. 1700
Jean Godot	c. 1720
Jean Godot	1738–1753
Martin Courtois	1753–1759
Louis Thomas	1759–1777
Louis Thomas	1793

===== Château-Voué =====
see: Dieuze

===== Courcelles-Chaussy =====
Mauclair	active in 1679
François Lhôpital	c. 1730–1737
Oswald Rhein	1737–1756
Jean-Henri Rhein	1756–1787
Georges Miraucourt	1787–1793

===== Courcelles-sur-Nied =====
Antoine Scherr	c. 1720
Georges Scherr	c. 1740
Nicolas Scherr	1750–1756
Jean-Pierre Miraucourt	1756–1793

===== Delme =====
Claude Thomas	c. 1700–1719
Nicolas Thomas	1719–1748
Michel Thomas	1748–1784
Jean Thomas	1784–1793

===== Dieuze =====
Laurent Urich	c. 1620–1654
Claude Urich	1654–1691
Jean-Jacques Bour	1691–1699
Claude Hermann	1699–1733
Jean Hermann	1733–1758
Jean-Jacques Hermann	1758–1761
Claude Hermann	1761–1793

===== Ébersviller =====
see: Hombourg-Budange

===== Elzange =====
see: Rodemack

===== Faulquemont =====
Nicolas Schweitzer	active in 1613
Christophe Schwartz	1618–1621
Jean-Henri Lander	1652–1682
Jean-Henri Rhein	1682–1695
Léonard Rhein	1695–1748
Jean Rhein	1748–1759
Jean-Pierre Rhein	1759–1793

===== Fénétrange =====
see: Niederstinzel

===== Filstroff =====
Jean-Nicolas Back	1686–1714
Jean-Nicolas Back	1714–1728
Jean-Philippe Mohr	1728
Christophe Parisot	1728–1729
André Heffinger	1729–1742
Jean-Pierre Back	1742–1792
Jean-Nicolas Rhein	1792–1793

===== Forbach =====
Jean-Christophe Grauel	1686–1692
Jean-Henri Burckhard	1692–1744
Jean-Nicolas Burckhard	1744–1776
François-Martin Burckhard	1776–1793
Matthieu Burckhard	1776–1793

===== Freistroff =====
Jean-Christophe Hopp	1685–1735
François Hopp	1735–1738
Jean Hopp	1738–1758
Jean-Pierre Hopp	1758–1766
Nicolas Schwind	1766–1781
Pierre Hopp	1781–1793

===== Gorze =====
Jean-Jacques Valche	1707–1714
Jean-Pierre Urich	1714–1740
Jean-Nicolas Guerchoux	1777–1793

===== Grostenquin =====
Jean-Jacques Cané	1725–1753
Oswald Back	1753–1793

===== Hérange =====
Jean-Ulrich Vollmar	1657–1690
Jean-Nicolas Vollmar	1690–1730
Jean-Jacques Grosholtz	1730–1735
Jean-Georges Lander	1766–1793

===== Hombourg-Budange =====
Jean-Jacques Lang	active in 1689
Matthieu Back	1738–1741
Jean-Léonard Schwind	1741–1744
Jean-Pierre Spirckel	1744–1773
Pierre Schwind	1773–1783
Jean-Jacques Wolff	1783–1793

===== Insming =====
Sébastien Parisot	1635–1707
Jean-Valentin Parisot	1707–1731
Jean-Jacques Bour	1731–1765
Jean-Thibaud Schweitzer	1765–1769
Jean-Jacques Bour	1769–1781
Valentin Grosholtz	1781–1793

===== Jallaucourt =====
see: Château-Salins

===== Kédange-sur-Canner =====
see: Hombourg-Budange

===== Kirsch-lès-Sierck =====
Pierre Wolff	1695–1721
Gaspard Wolff	1721–1722
Jean-Martin Wolff	1722–1740
Gaspard Wolff	1740–1743
François Wolff	1743–1776
Pierre Wolff	1776–1793

===== Lixheim =====
see: Hérange

===== Longeville-lès-Saint-Avold =====
Nicolas Schweitzer	active in 1613
Antoine Grauel	1717–1757
Jean Grauel	1757–1782
Jean-Pierre Grauel	1782–1786
Jean Wolff	1786–1787
Jean-Nicolas Wolff	1787–1793

===== Lorquin =====
Jean-Georges Burckhard	1680–1692
Dominique Burckhard	1709–1734
Michel Henry	1734–1765
Joseph Godot	1765–1779
Jean-Pierre Wolff	1779–1793

===== Louvigny =====
see: Courcelles-sur-Nied

===== Lutzelbourg =====
Jean-Jacques Grosholtz	1680–1712
Jean-Michel Grosholtz	1712–1743
Jean-Georges Grosholtz	1743–1787
Jean-Georges Grosholtz	1787–1793

===== Metz =====
Louis Schweitzer	1613–1653
Matthieu Schweitzer	1653–1680
Nicolas Schweitzer	1680–1684
Jean-Jacques Burckhard	1684–1693
Jean-Baptiste Barré	1693–1715
Nicolas Barré	1715–1730
Jean-Nicolas Roch	1730–1731 (last name also appears as Rauch)
Georges-Laurent Roch	1731–1748 (last name also appears as Rauch)
Nicolas Barré	1748–1779
Nicolas-Oswald Barré	1779–1801
Nicolas Barré	1801–1812
Matthieu Spirckel	1812–1833
Pierre-Emmanuel Desfourneaux	1833–1870

===== Montenach =====
Jean Spirckel	1680–1695
André Spirckel	1695–1711
Jean-Nicolas Roch	1711–1720 (last name also appears as Rauch)
Georges-Laurent Roch	1720–1721 (last name also appears as Rauch)
Jean-Pierre Spirckel	1721–1759
Nicolas Spirckel	1759–1793

===== Morhange =====
Étienne Schwartz	1610–1632
Antoine Hermann	1632–1670
Jean-Jacques Grosholtz	1670–1680
Pierre Hermann	1680–1682
Claude Hermann	1682–1733
Jean Hermann	1733–1758
Jean-Jacques Hermann	1758–1761
Claude Hermann	1761–1793

===== Niederstinzel =====
Jean-Nicolas Lander	1681–1692
Jean-Philippe Schild	1736–1762
Pierre Schild	1762–1786
Jacques Schild	1785–1793

===== Phalsbourg =====
see: Lutzelbourg

===== Porcelette =====
Gaspard Wolff	1740–1748
Pierre Wolff	1748–1785

===== Prévocourt =====
see: Delme

===== Puttelange-aux-Lacs =====
Jean-Jacques Carpe	1665–1686
Jean-Valentin Igel	1686–1702
Jean-Bernard Bour	1702–1734
Théodore Bour	1734–1752
Jean-Georges Bour	1752–1793

===== Rodemack =====
Jean-Henri Spirckel	1687–1709
Jean-Henri Spirckel	1709–1718
Jean-Bernard Spirckel	1718–1724
Jean-Théodore Burckhard	1724–1754
François Spirckel	1754–1773
Jean-Nicolas Spirckel	1773–1793

===== Saint-Avold =====
Jean Spengler	active in 1615
Christophe Lander	1625–1632
Jean-Nicolas Carpe	1632–1652
Jean-Gaspard Lander	1652–1688
Jean-Michel Lander	1688–1719
François-Gaspard Lander	1719–1745
Nicolas Lander	1745–1785
Christophe Back	1785–1793

===== Sarralbe =====
Jean-Pierre Rhein	1702–1724
Jacques-Charles Rhein	1724–1744
Jean-Thibaud Schweitzer	1765–1769
Jean-Jacques Bour	1769–1781
Jean Grosholtz	1781–1793

===== Sarrebourg =====
Guy Burckhard	1685–1698
Jean-Georges Burckhard	1698–1717
Georges-Frédéric Burck	1739–1740

===== Sarreguemines =====
Nicolas Bour	1666–1675
Jean-Bernard Bour	1675–1702
Jean-Jacques Bour	1702–1734
Jean-Pierre Bour	1734–1754
François Rhein	1754–1784
Jean Rhein	1784–1793

===== Schorbach =====
Jean-Henri Schild	1662–1699
Matthieu Schild	1699–1751
Georges-Frédéric Schild	1751–1756
Jean-Jacques Schild	1756–1775
Jean-Henri Schild	1775–1793

===== Sierck-les-Bains =====
see: Kirsch-lès-Sierck

===== Thionville =====
Nicolas Geiler	c. 1680
Jean-Henri Spirckel	1687–1709
Jean-Pierre Dillenburg	1709–1738
Jean-Pierre Dillenburg	1738–1748
Jean-Pierre Dillenburg	1748–1763
Jean-Baptiste Dillenburg	1748–1789
Jean-Baptiste Spirckel	1789–1793

===== Tincry =====
see: Delme

===== Tragny =====
see: Delme

===== Vatimont =====
see: Béchy

===== Vic-sur-Seille =====
Humbert Caille	active in 1633
Rémi Laurent	1663–1680
Pierre Hermann	1680–1688
Claude Parisot	1688–1734
Jean Parisot	1734–1777
Claude Parisot	1777–1793

==== Vosges (88) ====
===== Bruyères =====
François-Joseph Hiezely	1719–1736
Jacques Heidenreich	1736–1761

===== Charmes =====
Charles Magnard	1702–1733
Jean-Charles Chrétien	1746–1752
Jean-Joseph Hiezely	1752–1754
Léopold Chrétien	1754–1786
Antoine Hiezely	1786–1793

===== Châtel-sur-Moselle =====
see: Charmes

===== Châtenois =====
Jean Chrétien	1752–1756
Claude-François Chrétien	1756–1793

===== Darney =====
Jean-Pierre Courtois	1737–1769
Pierre-Fidèle Chrétien	1769–1793

===== Dompaire =====
Jean-Nicolas Laury	1709–1730
Didier Chapelain	1730–1752
Jean-Nicolas Chapelain	1752–1757
Antoine-François Fixard	1757–1774
Jean-François Fixard	1774–1788

===== Épinal =====
Jean Bontemps	active in 1601
Nicolas Guillemette de Fontenay	1601–1607
Martin	active in 1656
Jean Pierson	1672–1686
Jean-Nicolas Laury	1686–1726
Jean-Nicolas Laury	1726–1734
Matthieu Wees	1734–1753
Jean-Georges Anthès	1753–1762
François Wees	1762–1775
Joseph Wees	1775–1790
François Spirckel	1790–1797
François Wolff	1797–1803
Jean-Nicolas Chapelain	1803–1817
Antoine Chapelain	1817–1818
Jean-Nicolas Cané	1818–1840
Conrad Braun	1840–1849

===== La Neuveville-sous-Châtenois =====
see: Châtenois

===== Mirecourt =====
Jean-Dominique Chrétien	1700–1736
François Chrétien	1736–1754
Jean-Nicolas Chrétien	1776–1798

===== Neufchâteau =====
Antoine Chrétien	c. 1730–1745
Henri Chrétien	1745–1755
Claude-Michel Chrétien	1755–1756/57
Oswald Rhein	1756/57–1773
Jean-Nicolas Wolff	1770–1793

===== Rambervillers =====
François-Joseph Hiezely	active in 1719
Georges Chapelain	1746–1769
Jean-Michel Hiezely	1769–1770
Jean-Georges Hiezely	1770–1777

===== Remiremont =====
see: Saint-Dié

===== Saint-Dié =====
Nicolas Maurisat	active in 1621
Jean-Michel Burckhard	1701–1712
Georges-Adolphe Heidenreich	1712–1737
Jean-Michel Hiezely	active in 1757
Claude Hiezely	1774–1793

===== Saint-Nabord =====
see: Saint-Dié

=== Midi-Pyrénées ===
==== Ariège (09) ====
===== Foix =====
François Cabanié	1793–1802
Nicolas-Charles-Gabriel Dupuy	1802–1830
Joseph Beaufaye	1830–1849
François-Nicolas Beaufaye	1849–1853

==== Aveyron (12) ====
===== Rodez =====
Pradel	c. 1685
Jean-Louis Daydé	1780–1782
Jean Crossy	1782–1793
François Berger	1793–1797
Jean Crossy	1797–1824
Guy Le Moalic	1824–1828
Pierre-Victor Rives	1828–1853

==== Haute-Garonne (31) ====
===== Toulouse =====
Jean Barrot	1659–1666
Jean Touzet	active in 1666
Mathieu Bourideu	−1757 (his last name also appears as Mathieu Bouirou; sources also say 1759–1763)
Jean Daizes	active in 1768 (some sources say 1757–1769)
Antoine Varennes	1769/70–1812 (brother to Jean Varennes in Cahors)
Marcelin Berthoumier	1812–1817
Jean-François Guerchoux	1817–1818
Laurent Guerchoux	1818–1837
Henri-Matthieu Guerchoux	1837–1838

==== Gers (32) ====
===== Auch =====
Jean Palaso	1574–1575
Pierre André	active in 1623
Jean Dupin	c. 1630
Pierre Labailhe	active in 1650
Jean Cestarès	1662–1670
Jean Dumas	1673–1695
Jean Bruel	1699–1719
Guillaume Bruel	1719–1747
Bertrand Faroux	1752–1777 (name also given as Féraut)
Jean Daizes	1781–1788
Jean Rascat	1788–1790
? Goutte	1790–1792
Matthieu Benoist	1792–1793
Jean Rascat	1793–1798
Joseph Laporte	1798–1822
Jean Prosset	1822–1849

===== Lectoure =====
Jean Rascat	1780–1784

==== Lot (46) ====
===== Cahors =====
Jean Varennes	1761–1809 (brother to Antoine Varennes in Toulouse)
Romain Labat	1809–1810
Armand Varennes	1810–1818
Laurent-Désiré Desmorest	1827–1849

==== Hautes-Pyrénées (65) ====
===== Tarbes =====
Jean-Louis Daydé	active in 1792
Charles Lacaille	1792–1794
François Spirckel	1794–1802
Jean Rascat	1802–1818
Jean Grosholtz	1818–1823
Louis Grosholtz	1823–1843
Jean-Simon Grosholtz	1843–1844
Vincent Bornacini	1844–1848

==== Tarn (81) ====
===== Albi =====
Jean Matthieu	1598–1599
Sylvain	c. 1685
Étienne Étienne	1807–1815
Marcelin Rigal	1815–1824
Jean-Pierre Étienne	1824–1831
Pierre Miraucourt	1831–1849

==== Tarn-et-Garonne (82) ====
===== Montauban =====
Armand Varennes	1809–1818
Marcelin Berthoumier	1818–1824
Marcelin Rigal	1824–1837
Jean-François Guerchoux	1837–1849

=== Nord-Pas-de-Calais ===
==== Nord (59) ====
===== Cambrai =====
Escluve	active in 1368
Robert Fayet	active in 1595
Nicolas Delannois	active in 1611
Pierre de Groville	1627–1629
Guillaume-Joseph Vermeille	c. 1730–1750
François Damonville	active in 1750
Pierre-François Vermeille	1790–1793

===== Douai =====
Jean de Le Porte	active in 1459
Jacques Galoppin	active in 1679
François-Joseph Demettre	1795–1825
Louis Demettre	1825–1828
Pierre Demettre	1828–1835
François Demettre	1835–1870

===== Lille =====
Pierre Vermeille	active in 1766
Charles-André-Joseph Demettre	1766–1773
Pierre-Joseph Foyez	1773–1792

===== Maubeuge =====
André Vivien	c. 1770

===== Valenciennes =====
Jean Boitquin	active in 1679
Julien-Joseph Vermeille	1780–1801
Pierre-Joseph Vermeille	1801–1802

==== Pas-de-Calais (62) ====
===== Arras =====
Henri Cousin	c. 1470
Jean-Baptiste Outredebanque	1753–1780
Pierre Outredebanque	1780–1795

===== Boulogne =====
Jean-André-Joseph Tanné	1731–1766
Charles-André-Joseph Demettre	1766–1773
François Lacaille	1773–1793

===== Calais =====
Jean-André-Joseph Tanné	1729–1766
Charles-André-Joseph Demettre	1766–1773
François Lacaille	1773–1793

=== Pays de la Loire ===
==== Loire-Atlantique (44; before 1957 Loire Inférieure) ====
===== Nantes =====
Pierre Poupin	1574–1575
Charles Davy	active in 1626
Macé Bouëtard	active in 1673
Jean Verdier	1673–1686
Laurent Leroy	1686–1688
Pierre Judic	1688–1701 (name also rendered as Jeudy)
François Durand	1701–1705
Pierre Chaumont	1705–1725
Étienne Ganié	1725–1735
Jacques Bouëtard	1735–1738
Pierre Chaumont	1738–1755
Étienne Ganié	1755–1757
Jacques-Victor Ganié	1757–1784
Charles-François Férey	1784–1789
Michel Sénéchal	1789–1794
François-Joseph Férey	1794–1798
François Lacaille	1798–1805
François Lacaille	1805–1823
Jacques-Auguste Ganié	1823–1845
Jacques-Henri Ganié	1845–1849

==== Maine-et-Loire (49) ====
===== Angers =====
Adam Lesné	active in 1546
Nicolas Cousnier	1615–1618
Jacques Cousnier	1618–1622
Pierre Roussière	1622–1625
Pierre Briand	1670–1677
Julien Beudin	1677–1681
Pierre Verdier	1681–1687
Jean Morin	1687–1689
Laurent Leroy	1689–1709
François Verdier	en 1709–1717
Jean Petitjean	1717–1720
Nicolas Férey	1720–1725
François Férey	1725–1736
Pierre Charpentier	1736–1753
Jean-Baptiste Charpentier	1753–1766
Nicolas-Charles-Gabriel Charpentier	1753–1758
Jean-Baptiste Charpentier	1766–1771
Jacques Filliaux	1771–1785
Jacques-Joseph-Hyacinthe Filliaux	1785–1808
Pierre-Jacques Ganié	1808–1829
Charles-Gabriel Jouenne	1829–1832
Pierre-Jacques Ganié	1832–1848
Stanislas Ganié	1848–1870

===== Saumur =====
André Carouault	activ in 1634
Jean Verdier	1674–1687
Etienne Robert	1712–1727
Pierre Asselin	1727–1731
Etienne Robert	1731–1735
Yves Robert	1735–1759
Antoine Dupuy	1759–1767
Antoine Dupuy	1767–1785
Louis-Jean Dupuy	1785–1793

==== Mayenne (53) ====
===== Château-Gontier =====
René Chaumont	active in 1686
Martin Dupuy	1717–1722
Jacques Dupuy	1722–1742
Jacques-François Dupuy	1742–1759
Pierre Dupuy	1759–1783
Nicolas-Charles-Gabriel Dupuy	1783–1793

===== Laval =====
François Chaumont	1680–1687
Jacques Bouëtard	1720–1730
Jacques-Etienne Bouëtard	1730–1740
Pierre Martin	1740–1756
Jacques Durand	1756–1782
Pierre Martin	1782–1785
Jacques-François Durand	1785–1813
Henri Bickler	1813–1815
Jacques-Joseph Durand	1815–1819 (executed for homicide)
Pierre-Michel Durand	1819–1823
François-Hippolyte Desmorest	1823–1843
Jean-Jacques Ehrardt	1843–1849

==== Sarthe (72) ====
===== La Flèche =====
Jean Billon	active in 1686

===== Le Mans =====
Jean Benoist	1698–1720
Joseph Filliaux	1720–1723
Pierre Charpentier	1723–1733
Joseph Charpentier	1733–1750
Louis-Jacques Filliaux	1750–1767
Nicolas-Louis Jouenne	1750–1767
Nicolas-Louis Jouenne	1767–1784
Charles Jouenne	1767–1822
Isidore-Joseph Vermeille	1822–1827
Romain Labat	1827–1846
Pierre Marc	1846–1849

==== Vendée (85) ====
===== Fontenay-le-Comte =====
Jean Fraigneau	c. 1700–1710
François Fraigneau	1710–1728
Michel Clément	1728–1745
Pierre-Victor Asselin	1745–1755
Joseph Asselin	1755–1778
Pierre Asselin	1778–1802
André-Thomas Férey	1802
Nicolas-Louis Jouenne	1802–1805
Pierre Wolff	1805–1824
Pierre Wolff	1824–1849

=== Picardie ===
==== Aisne (02) ====
===== Laon =====
Mathurin Porrès	active round 1590
Mathurin Damet	1595–1617
François Roussel	1660–1664
Louis Desmorest	1664–1710
Nicolas Desmorest	1710–1761
François-Joseph Desmorest	1761–1764
Jean-LouisDesmorest	1764–1812
Isidore-Joseph Vermeille	1812–1823
Jean-François-Philibert Robineau	1823–1845
Frédéric-Henri-Auguste Robineau	1845–1849

===== Soissons =====
Jean Gressier	1680–1705
André Gressier	1705–1726
François Desmorest	1726–1750
Nicolas-François Desmorest	1750–1761
Denis-François Hérisson	1761–1762
Charles-René Zelle	1762–1776
Charles-Henri-Martin Zelle	1776–1792

==== Oise (60) ====
===== Beauvais =====
Robert Berger	1749–1763
Jacques-Robert Berger	1763–1784
François-Robert-Gabriel Berger	1784–1798
Jean-François-Philibert Robineau	1798–1799
François-Robert-Gabriel Berger	1799–1805
Robert-Gabriel Berger	1805–1813
Charles-Henri-Constant Desmorest	1813–1849

===== Clermont =====
(former Clermont-en-Beauvaisis, also called Clermont-en-France)

see: Senlis

===== Compiègne =====
Pierre Clavière	active in 1627
Cyprien Levert	1660–1670
Jacques Hérisson	1670–1680
Guillaume Hérisson	1680–1683
Jacques Dollé	1683–1717
Louis-André Desmorest	1717–1719
Jacques Dollé	1719–1749
Nicolas Dollé	1749–1762
Louis-Nicolas Dollé	1762–1793

===== Crépy-en-Valois =====
Pierre Hérisson	active in 1629
Louis Berger	1700–1713
Jacques Dollé	1713–1717
Robert Berger	1717–1763
Jacques-Robert Berger	1763–1784
François-Robert-Gabriel Berger	1784–1793

===== Noyon =====
Féry Leblon	active in 1617
François-Joseph Desmorest	1743–1793

===== Senlis =====
Claude Harrie	active in 1544
Jean Taffin	active in 1571
Philippe Hérisson	1622–1662
Claude Hérisson	1662–1667
Philippe Hérisson	1667–1673
Jacques Hérisson	1673–1680
François-Cyprien Hérisson	1680–1727
Nicolas Hérisson	1727–1742
François-Nicolas Hérisson	1742–1755
Denis-François Hérisson	1755–1761
Nicolas-François Desmorest	1761–1784
Louis-Auguste-Nicolas Desmorest	1784–1793
Pierre-Nicolas-François Desmorest	1784–1793

==== Somme (80) ====
===== Amiens =====
Pierre Phélippart	active in 1463
Haquin de Bergue	active in 1468
Jean de Tournai	active in 1516
Louis-Charles Hébert	1731–1760
Joseph Foyez	1760–1767
Pierre-François Vermeille	1767–1795
François Étienne	1795
Jean Boursier	1795–1796
Jacques-Bonaventure Collet de Charmoy	1796–1816
Amand-Constant Vermeille	1816–1837 (Armand-Constant?)
Amand Vermeille	1837–1852 (Armand?)
Jacques-Henri Ganié	1852–1853
Nicolas Roch	1853–1870 (his last name seometimes appears as Rauch; after 1870, see: Monsieur de Paris)

=== Poitou-Charentes ===
==== Charente (16) ====
===== Angoulême =====
Jean Cestarès	1656–1682
Guy Robert	1684–1698
Robert Guitton	1700–1702
Joseph Senigotte	1728–1740
Jean Jacquinet	1740–1742
Jacques Berger	1744–1758
Jean Brunet	1758–1760
	(interim executioners between 1760 and 1789)
Jean Roch	1789–1802 (his last name also appears as Rauch)
Pierre Pradel	1802–1816
François-Xavier Rhein	1816–1827
Matthieu-Isidore Rhein	1827–1840
Claude Roch	1840–1849 (his last name also appears as Rauch)

==== Charente-Maritime (17) ====
===== La Rochelle =====
Hilaire Camyon	round 1610
Jacques Lafargue	1663–1680
Jacques Lafargue	1694–1702
Pierre Lafargue	1702–1713
Pierre Combaud	1713–1719
Pierre Landeau	1719–1723
Victor Landeau	1723–1726
Christophe Benoist	1726–1747
Jean Benoist	1747–1749
François Férey	1749–1757
Joseph Férey	1757–1774
François-Charles-Gabriel Férey	1757–1769
Joseph Lacaille	1774–1789
Jacques-Bonaventure Collet de Charmoy	1789–1795

===== Rochefort =====
Jean Montagne	1793–1795

===== Saintes =====
Jean Benoist	1725–1728
Pierre Benoist	1728–1750
Maixent-Mathurin Ayrault	1750–1763
Christophe Ayrault	1763–1802
François Spirckel	1802–1825
Matthieu Spirckel	1825–1849

==== Deux-Sèvres (79) ====
===== Niort =====
Pierre Landeau	1695–1723
Victor Landeau	1723–1731
Pierre Asselin	1731–1748
Joseph Asselin	1748–1756
Augustin Asselin	1756–1781
Augustin-Joseph Asselin	1781–1813
Augustin-André Asselin	1813–1823
Louis-Augustin-Désiré Asselin	1823–1849

===== Saint-Maixent-l'École =====
Réneteau	active in 1667
Chaussonnier	active in 1683
Mathurin Ayrault	1705–1722
Louis Ayrault	1722–1736
Mathurin Ayrault	1736–1762
Clément Ayrault	1762–1785
Maixent-Mathurin Ayrault	1762–1763

===== Thouars =====
Jean-Jacques Fraigneau	1710–1722
Martin Dupuy	1732–1745
Louis Duchesne	1745–1765
Jean-Martin Dupuy	1765–1793

==== Vienne (86) ====
===== Civray =====
Jean David	1775–1793

===== Loudun =====
Duchesne	active in 1634
Michel Clément	1718–1720
Louis Ayrault	1720–1725
Louis Duchesne	1725–1758
François Duchesne	1758–1787
François Berger	1787–1793

===== Poitiers =====
Jean Verdier	active in 1626
Michel Verdier	active in 1670
Étienne Renéteau	1687–1707
Mathurin Pinocheau	1707–1709
Mathurin Pinocheau	1709–1721
Guy Renéteau	1721–1727
François Verdier	1727–1764
François Verdier	1764–1772
Pierre-François Verdier	1764–1796
Louis-Nicolas Dollé	1796–1805
Joseph-Martin Benoist	1805–1809
Pierre-Nicolas Berthelot	1809–1827
Nicolas Wolff	1827–1831
Matthieu Wolff	1831–1846
Raymond Peyrussan	1846–1854
Charles-André Wolff	1854–1870

=== Provence-Alpes-Côte d'Azur ===
==== Alpes-de-Haute-Provence (04) ====
===== Digne =====
Pierre Back	1793–1794
Pierre Cané	1794
François Montagne	1794–1795
Jean-Pierre Thiéry	1795–1816
François-Xavier Reine	1816–1817 (his name comes also written as Rhein)
Alexandre-Victor Jouenne	1817–1849

==== Hautes-Alpes (05) ====
===== Gap =====
Nicolas Viard	1793–1794
Antoine Roch	1794–1797 (his last name also appears as Rauch)
François Roch	1797–1805 (his last name also appears as Rauch)
Laurent Roch	1805–1826 (his last name also appears as Rauch)
Hyacinthe Roch	1826–1836 (his last name also appears as Rauch)
? Schlick	1836–1841
Victor Roch	1841–1849 (his last name also appears as Rauch)

==== Alpes-Maritimes (06) ====
===== Nice =====
Joseph-François Desmorest	1798–1804
François Berger	1804–1805
Joseph-François Desmorest	1805–1814 (the same like from 1798 to 1804)

==== Bouches-du-Rhône (13) ====
===== Aix-en-Provence =====
Laurent-Martin Coquelin	1802–1809
Pierre-Gabriel Giraudon	1809–1810
Louis Alexis	1810–1811
Romain Labat	1811–1814
François-Joseph Férey	1814–1819
Bénigne-Nicolas-François Brochard	1819–1820
Nicolas Burckhard	1820–1834 (his last name is also written Bourgard)
Pierre-Thermidor Vermeille	1834–1842
Henri-Charles Desmorest	1842–1853
Laurent-Désiré Desmorest	1853–1860
Vincent Bornacini	1860–1870

==== Var (83) ====
===== Draguignan =====
Joseph Chaylan	1799–1802
Jean Wolff	1802
Matthieu Burckhard	1802–1814
François-Joseph Heidenreich	1814–1827
Jean-François Heidenreich	1827–1835
Nicolas Chtarque	1835–1841
Laurent Bornacini	1841–1848
Vincent Bornacini	1848–1849

==== Vaucluse (84) ====
===== Carpentras =====
François Berger	1797–1799
Pierre-Nicolas-François Desmorest	1799–1830
Adrien-Nicolas-Joseph Cané	1830–1834
Antoine Garoux	1834–1838
Jean-Jacques Erhardt	1838–1843
Louis-Henri Desmorest	1843–1849

=== Rhône-Alpes ===
==== Ain (01) ====
===== Bourg-en-Bresse =====
François Lauret	active in 1738
Geniès Armilhon	active round 1765 (former executioner of Clermont-Ferrand)
Nicolas Montagne	active in 1766
Désiré Giboz	active in 1792
Louis Ripert	1792–1793
Claude-Antoine Chrétien	1793–1794 (interim; executioner of Chalon)
Charles Frey	1794–1795
François Vially	1795–1796
Pierre Ripert	1796–1797 (interim; executioner of Lyon)
Jean-Pierre Reine	1797–1805 (his name also appears as Rhein)
Paul Martinet	1805–1808
Jean Guillamet	1808–1845
Nicolas Grosholtz	1845–1849

==== Ardèche (07) ====
===== Privas =====
Henri Labille	1793–1794
Pierre-Nicolas-François Desmorest	1794–1795
Jean-Pierre Bickler	1798–1811 (his last name also appears as Pickler)
Nicolas-Pierre Hermann	1811–1832
Pierre Roch	1832–1836 (his last name also appears as Rauch)
Léonard Richim	1836–1849

==== Drôme (26) ====
===== Valence =====
Laurent-Marin Coquelin	1792–1793
Jean-Pierre Combe	1793–1805
Jean-Baptiste-Oswald Cané	1805–1822
Jean-François Cané	1822–1835
François Wolff	1835–1844
Hyacinthe Roch	1844–1849 (his last name also appears as Rauch sometimes)

==== Isère (38) ====
===== Grenoble =====
Antoine de Loches	active in 1519
Guillaume de Leison	active in 1553
Vincent Brun	active in 1557
Michel Perrin	active in 1562
? Lerbras	c. 1565
? Rozeau	c. 1575
? Palevin	c. 1585
Michaud-Pierron	c. 1595
Jean Brocard	active in 1611
Jean Janon	active in 1670
Jean Eynard	active in 1674
Jean Janon	active in 1691
Jacques Joubert	1702–1720
François Ripert	1725–1782
Jean Ripert	1782–1790
Pierre Ripert	1790–1793
François Pache	active in 1793
Jean-Baptiste Desmorest	1794–1808
Pierre-Joseph Vermeille	1808–1820
Jean Guerchoux	1820–1835
Jean-François Heidenreich	1835–1847
Jean-Pierre Piot	1847–1862

==== Loire (42) ====
===== Feurs =====
Louis Faroux	1793–1795

===== Montbrison =====
Louis-Richard Faroux	1734–1760
Jean Faroux	1760–1793
Jean Faroux	1795–1799
Jean-Pierre Roch	en 1799–1801 (last name also given as Rauch)
Louis Faroux	1801–1813
Joseph-François Desmorest	1813–1823
Nicolas Roch	1823–1849 (last name also given as Rauch)

==== Rhône (69) ====
===== Lyon =====
Jean Jacquenot	1525–1526; active again in 1529? (his last name also appears written as Jacquemot)
Antoine Benoît	−1723 (Benoit and his wife have been murdered in the night from 18 to 19 May 1723)
Jean Lavoué	1723–1735
Marguerite–Julienne Le Paistour	1745–1749 (sacked after involving in a mayor robbery; married and became a housewife in Cancale)
Jean Ripert	1792–1794
Claude-Antoine Chrétien	1804–1842
Henri Lac	1853–1870

==== Savoie (73) ====
===== Chambéry =====
Laurent Rhein	1794–1810
Pierre Rhein	1810–1815
Jean-Emile Grosholtz	1860–1866
Jules Cané	1866–1868 (not 100% confirmed, but most likely)

==== Haute-Savoie (74) ====
no executioner known so far

=== Monsieur de Paris: The Executioners of the French Republic ===
In 1870 the Republic of France abolished all local executioners and named the executioner of Paris, Jean-François Heidenreich, Exécuteur des Arrêts Criminels, which became France's official description of the executioner's occupation. From then on, there would be only one executioner to carry out death sentences for all of France except Corsica, which would follow in 1875. As the Republic's executioner was required to live in Paris, people soon started to refer to him as "Monsieur de Paris", "The Mister from Paris". At the occasion of his nomination, Heidenreich could choose four among France's former local executioners to be his aides.

Jean-François Heidenreich	1871–1872
Nicolas Roch	1872–1879
Louis Deibler	1879–1898
Anatole Deibler	1899–1939
Jules-Henri Desfourneaux	1939–1951
André Obrecht	1951–1976
Marcel Chevalier	1976–1981

== Asia ==
=== Bangladesh ===
Shahjahan Bhuiyan	1988–2023

=== China ===
Hu Xiao	(working in 2011)

=== Israel ===
Shalom Nagar	1962 (executed Adolf Eichmann)

=== India ===
==== Mullick family, Culcutta ====
- Shivlal Mullick (West Bengal)
- Nata Mullick (son of Shivlal Mullick) (hanged Dhananjoy Chatterjee in 2004) (West Bengal)
- Mahadeb Mullick (son of Nata Mullick) (West Bengal) (nominated, but not confirmed if he actually ever took the "job")
- Prabhat Mullick (grandson of Nata Mullik) (West Bengal)

==== Lakshman Ram family, Meerut ====
- Lakshman Ram Majeera (hanged Bhagat Singh)
- Mammu Singh (son of LakshmanRam Majeera) (Meerut, Uttar Pradesh)(last hanged Kanta Prasad Tiwari of Jabalpur(Madhya Pradesh) in year 1997)
- Kalu Ram (hanged one of the two Indira Gandhi murder convicts)
- Pawan Kumar (hanged the Nirbhaya rapists in 2020) (2011 -till date )

(son of Mammu Singh) (Meerut)

- Babu Ahmad (West Bengal)

==== Others ====
- Arjun Bhika Jadhav (Maharashtra)
- Janardhan Pillai (Kerala)
- Pooja Raj (Delhi)
- "Jallad" Ahmadullah Khan (Uttar Pradesh) 1965–
- Balkrishna Rao Valekar (Madhya Pradesh) (Hanged Shivanand Tiwari, who accused murder of his wife and sons)

=== Malaysia ===
Tadashi Suzuki	1941–1945 (Japanese occupation executioner for Butterworth and Pulau Pinang)
Rajendran Kuppusamy	−1986 (died 15 November 2011)
Kesavan A. Arumugam	before 2001 – after 2010

=== Pakistan ===
In Pakistan, executioners have obligatorily to be Christians.

Tara Masih	−1984 (hanged Zulfikar Ali Bhutto)
Kala Masih	(active in 1931, when he hanged Bhagat Singh)
Lal Masih	1984–2010
Sadiq Masih (senior)	(son of Kala Masih)
Sadiq Masih (junior)	1984– (son of Sadiq Masih senior)
Sabir Masih	2006/07– (son of Sadiq Masih junior)

=== Thailand ===
Tip Meeyot	1935–1943
Rian Phueamklangmuang	before1934(Beheading), 1939–1956(Execution by shooting)
Phian Konrangdee	1959–1974
Mui Chuicharoen	1960–1974
Prathom Khruapheng	1977–1984
Thinyo Chan-O-than	1977–1987
Riap Thiamsakoo	1977
Chavoret Jaruboon	1984–2003
Sanan Boonloy	1997–1998
Prayut Sanan	1960–1974
Phithak Neungsittha	2001–2020

=== Saudi Arabia ===
Abdallah Al-Bishi
Ahmed Rezkallah
Muhammad Saad al-Beshi
Saeed Al-Sayaf

=== Singapore ===
Bert Seymour	−1959
Darshan Singh	1959–2005 (sacked); 2005–2006 (readmitting to retirement) (so Singh did not carry out the execution of Van Tuong Nguyen in 2005)

=== Islamic State ===
Mohammed Emwazi	−2015 (British citizen known as Jihadi John)
Maxime Hauchard	active in 2014 (French citizen converted to Islam in 2008)
Michael Dos Santos	active in 2014 (French citizen who has been using the name Abou Othman after his conversion to Islam)

== North America ==
=== United States ===
John C. Woods (1911–1950). Hangman for the Third Army in WWII. He was one of the hangmen who executed Nazi war criminals.

Joseph Malta (1918–1999) was the hangman who, with John C. Woods, executed the top 10 leaders of the Third Reich in Nuremberg on 16 October 1946, for crimes against humanity.

Phil Hanna (1873–1948) was a wealthy farmer who became a volunteer hangman for humanitarian reasons after witnessing a botched execution, and performed 70 hangings across the nation.

==== Alabama ====
Under state law, the warden of the Holman Correctional Facility (previously Kilby Prison) must serve as executioner. The deputy warden serves as an alternate should the warden be unavailable at the time. Should both be unavailable, the commissioner of the Department of Corrections appoints the executioner.

Clarence Burford, warden at Kilby Prison from 1952 to 1965, was involved in several executions.
Murray Daniels, deputy warden at Kilby Prison in the 1950s, involved in eleven executions.
J.D. White, warden at Holman Correctional Facility from 1980 to 1983. Executed Alabama's first post-Furman inmate, John Louis Evans on 22 April 1983.
Willie Johnson, warden at Holman Correctional Facility from 1983 to 1988
Charlie Jones, warden at Holman Correctional Facility from 1988 to 2002
Grantt Culliver, warden at Holman Correctional Facility from 2002 to 2009
Gary Hetzel, warden at Holman Correctional Facility since 2012

==== Arkansas ====
Maledon, George

During the first part of the 20th century, operators of the electric chair were known as "State electricians".

==== Colorado ====
John J. "Jack" Eeles – corrections officer who served as hangman at Colorado State Penitentiary until he was murdered in a prison riot on 3 October 1929.

Wayne K. Patterson – warden at Colorado State Penitentiary who pulled the lever to start execution of Luis Jose Monge on 2 June 1967. This was the last execution in the United States prior to the 1972 US Supreme Court case Furman v. Georgia, which temporarily invalidated the death penalty procedures nationwide. Patterson was opposed to capital punishment.

==== Indiana ====
Jack P. Duckworth	1981 – Warden of Indiana State Prison at Michigan City who was required by law to throw the switch at the electrocution of Steven Judy

==== Louisiana ====
Louis Congo	c. 1725–1737 or after (an emancipated slave appointed public executioner of Louisiana (New France))
Grady H. Jarratt	1941 (last name also given as Jarrett)
Edward "Ephie" Foster	active in 1946 (substitute executioner)
"Sam Jones"	1983–1991 (Sam Jones is a pseudonym used by that executioner)

==== Massachusetts ====
- Edwin F. Davis 1907 – 1912 – Also performed executions in New York, Ohio, and New Jersey
- Edwin B. Currier circa 1910 – Chief Engineer at Massachusetts General Hospital who operated electric chair control panel during executions at Charlestown Prison.

==== Mississippi ====
Jimmy Thompson – 1940–1950
Thomas Berry Bruce – 1957–1987. He executed between 14 and 16 people, including Jimmy Lee Gray, during his career.
Donald Hocutt – 1987–1995

==== Missouri ====
Alan R. Doerhoff	(apparently involved in executions also in Indiana, Arizona and at least one Federal)

==== New York ====
===== Erie County =====
County Sheriff (later President of the United States) Grover Cleveland	6 September 1872 and 14 February 1873

===== New York State Electrician =====
Edwin Davis	1890–1914
John Hulbert	1913–1926
Robert Elliott	1926–1939
Joseph Francel	1939–1953
Dow Hover	1953–1963

==== Ohio ====
===== Before Statehood =====
- Sheriff John Ludlow on 15 November 1792 (today's Hamilton County)

===== Adams County =====
- Sheriff John Ellison, Jr. on 10 December 1808

===== Cuyahoga County =====
- Sheriff Samuel S. Baldwin and Deputy Sheriff & Coroner Levi Johnson on 26 June 1812
- Sheriff Miller S. Spangler on 1 June 1855
- Sheriff Felix Nicola on 9 and 10 February 1866 and 10 August 1866
- Sheriff John Frazee on 4 or 13 February 1869 and 25 April 1872
- Sheriff Pardon B. Smith on 29 April 1874
- Sheriff A. P. Winslow on 22 June 1876
- Sheriff John Wilcox on 13 February 1879

===== Fairfield County =====
- Sheriff Daniel Kishler and Coroner John Heck on 14 October 1836

===== Franklin County =====
- Sheriff William Domigan and Coroner A. W. Reader on 9 February 1844 (a double execution, including the first reported execution of a woman in Ohio's history)
- Sheriff Silas W. Park and Coroner Elias Gaver on 17 December 1858

===== Gallia County =====
- Sheriff Samuel Holcomb on 9 September 1817

===== Ross County =====
- Sheriff Jeremiah McLene and Coroner Benjamin Urmston on 3 August 1804

===== Portage County =====
- Sheriff Asa Burroughs on 30 November 1816

===== State Executioners with the Gallows =====
- Warden Isaac Peetry between 1885 and 1886, required by state law to be the executioner of death sentences
- Warden E.G. Coffin between 1886 and 1890, required by state law to be the executioner of death sentences
- Warden B.F. Dyer between 1890 and 1892, required by state law to be the executioner of death sentences
- Warden C.C. James between 1892 and 1896, required by state law to be the executioner of death sentences
- Warden E.G. Coffin between 1896 and 1897, required by state law to be the executioner of death sentences

===== State Executioners with the Electric Chair =====
- Warden E.G. Coffin between 1897 and 1900, required by state law to be the executioner of death sentences
- Warden W.N. Darby between 1900 and 1903, required by state law to be the executioner of death sentences
- Warden E. A. Hershey between 1903 and 1904, required by state law to be the executioner of death sentences
- Warden O.B. Gould between 1904 and 1909, required by state law to be the executioner of death sentences
- Warden T.H.B. Jones between 1909 and 1913, required by state law to be the executioner of death sentences
- Warden D.E. Thomas between 1913 and 1935, required by state law to be the executioner of death sentences
- Warden J.C. Woodard between 1935 and 1939, required by state law to be the executioner of death sentences
- Warden F.D. Henderson between 1939 and 1948, required by state law to be the executioner of death sentences
- Warden R.W. Alvis between 1948 and 1959, required by state law to be the executioner of death sentences
- Warden B.C. Sacks between 1959 and 1961, required by state law to be the executioner of death sentences
- Warden E.L. Maxwell between 1961 and 1963, required by state law to be the executioner of death sentences

==== Oklahoma ====
- S.C. Treadwell and Mack Treadwell between 1909 and 1919
- Rich Owens between 1918 and 1947
- Mike Mayfield, corrections officer between 1962 and 1966

==== Pennsylvania ====
- Zoe Himes in 1911 (a secretary of Clarion County, PA, Court House, she reportedly executed Vincent Voycheck on 1 June 1911)
- Frank Wilson electrical industry superintendent from Pittsburgh area who served as executioner between 1939 and 1953 at Rockview Prison.

==== South Carolina ====
Tench Boozer (1911–1918)

==== Texas ====
- Joe Byrd – Captain of the guard at the Walls Unit who served as executioner between 1936 and 1964. The nearby prison cemetery, where unclaimed remains of executed inmates are buried by the state, is named in his honor.
- W. James "Jim" Estelle – Director of the Texas Department of Criminal Justice (TDCJ) between 1972 and 1983. Was designated executioner under policy developed by the TDCJ in 1976. Was the individual pushing the drugs into the IV lines at the December 1982 execution of Charlie Brooks, the first inmate in the United States to be executed by lethal injection.

==== Virginia ====
Jerry Givens	1982–1999 – Givens, a corrections officer at Virginia State Penitentiary and later Greensville Correctional Center, served as official executioner for all executions carried out in the state during this time period.

==== West Virginia ====
===== Jefferson County =====
Sheriff James W. Campbell and Deputy Sheriff John Avis	(hanged John Brown 2 December 1859)

=== Canada ===
André Bernard	1645
"The Drummer"	1648–1653
?	1653–1665
Jacques Daigre	1665–1680 (last name also given as Daigle)
Jean Rattier	1680–1703
Jacques Élie	1703/05–1710
Pierre Rattier	1710–1723 (youngest son of Jean Rattier)
Gilles Lenoir	1726–1728
Malgein	1728–1730 (a slave from Martinique)
Guillaume Langlais	1730–1733
Mathieu Léveillé	1733–1743 (a slave from Martinique)
Jean-Baptiste Duclos	1743–1750 (dit "Saint-Front")
Jean Corolère	1751–1752
Pierre Gouet	1754–1755 (nicknamed "Lalime")
Denis Quévillon	1755 (his hanging for theft was his successor Montelle's first job)
Joseph Montelle	1755– c. 1759
John Radclive	1892–1911 (last name also given as Radcliffe)
Arthur Ellis	1912–1935 (Arthur Ellis was the pseudonym of executioner Arthur Bartholomew English)
"Camille Blanchard"	1935–1960 (Camille Blanchard was the pseudonym that executioner of Canada used)
"John Ellis"	1960–1976 (John Ellis was the pseudonym Canada's last executioner used while interviewed on a TV show)

=== Germany ===
==== Pre-Germany Executioners ====
Mannäi	~20 a.C. (Machaerus)

==== Ansbach ====
Friedrich? (also known as Meister Friedrich)	1575–1611

==== Augsburg ====
(name not found out yet)	13th century (The first one ever nominated as a professional executioner in Germany; that was in 1276, and for the first time – simultaneously – an executioner's job description was published)
Veit Stolz	1538–1613
Joas Lemler	~1567
Hans Deibler	1572–1594 (Before 1561–1571 in Memmingen; ancestor to the French Republic's- executioners Louis Deibler and Anatole Deibler)
Michael Deibler	1594–1621
Dietrich Metz	1621–1624?
Georg Leichumb	1624–1629
Max Philipp Hartmann	1677–1679
Johann Adam Hartmann	1686–1706
Johann Jakob Scheller	~1705
? Kuisle	−1714
Franz Trenckhler	1714–1723
Johann Georg Tränckler	1723–1730
Johann Adam Scheller	~1730
Johann Georg Tränckhler	~1768
Johann Pflügler	−1789 (committed suicide 1790)

==== Babenhausen ====
? Fischer	~1711

==== Bamberg ====
? Schmidt	~1537

==== Berlin ====
Benedictus Barsch	1535–1560
Hermann Rüter, or Hartmann Rüter	1560–1571
Caspar Spiegel	1576–1586
Martin Heintze	1586-?
Hans Lissen	1631–1636
Gottfried Zürek	1636–1639
? Gebhart	1639–1653
Hans Rudolff	1647–1655
Gottfried?	1655
Caspar Götze	1655–1669
Hans Müller	1669–1680
Heinrich Müller	1681–1690
Martin Koblentz	1690–1702
Hans Michael Eichfeld	1702–1705
Augustin Konrad Walter	1705–1710
Hans Michael Eichfeld	1710–1714
Christopf Stoff	1714
? Neumann	1714–1719
Georg Wilhelm	1720–1728
Martin Hennings	1729–1731
Martin Weydemann	~1731
Gottfried Weydemann	1745–1748
Jakob Kratzel	1748–1752
? Meyer	1752–1769
Johann Daniel Brandt	1769–1808
Christian Friedrich Krafft	1808–1819
August Hellriegel	1818–1834
? Hormuth	1834
A. W. Krafft	1834–1860

==== Bernau ====
Johann Christoph Jeck	1729–1730
? Michaelis	1730–1740
Martin Gottlieb Koch	1740–1747
Andreas Kleine	1747–17??
August Heinrich Kaufmann	1780–1802
Carl Friedrich Kaufmann	1802–1836?
Wilhelm Weber	1836–1850
Carl Altmann	1853–1874?
Friedrich Schmidt	1874–1877
Ferdinand August Zimmermann	1877–?

==== Biberach ====
Barthel Deibler (also Deübler)	~1637

==== Bitterfeld ====
? Heintze (known as Sohn des Torgauers)	16..?

==== Borna ====
? Polster	~1723

==== Bötzow, Oranienburg ====
Dietrich Jeck	~1586

==== Braunschweig ====
Claus Frölich	~1652
Christoph Pfeffer	~1724
? Funcke	~1818

==== Bremen ====
? Adelarius	−1539
Christian Schwarz	1827–1860 (Unknown when he passed from Bremen City's local executioner to Bremen's state executioner; from 1843 to 1859 he also was Hannover's state executioner)
Johann Christian Göppel	1738-

==== Brüx ====
? Huß	~1760

==== Burgau ====
Georg Vollmair	~1734

==== Burglengenfeld ====
Georg Vollmar	~1644

==== Celle ====
Suhr family	~1650–1750

==== Cologne ====
Franz Joseph Wohlmuth	~1566

==== Dillingen ====
Johann Vollmar	~1639

==== Dinkelsbühl ====
? Span	~1644 (

==== Donauwörth ====
Marx Deibler (also Max Deubler)	~1625
Jakob Bickle	~1640
Johann Michael Kober	~1720
Johann Hörmann	1802–1833

==== Dresden ====
Melchior Wahl "von Dreißigacker"	1630–1647
Melchior Vogel	−1695

==== Dühnen ====
? Voss	~1817

==== Eger ====
? Peter	~1486
? Philipp	~1581
? Huß	−1781
Karl Huß	1781–1827

==== Frankenstein ====
Andreas Boden	~1644

==== Frankfurt am Main ====
Schelm von Bergen	mid-12th century (Most likely not a professional executioner)
? Hans	~1370
? Friedrich	~1446
Jonas Fischer	−1690

==== Freiberg/Sachsen ====
Christian Naumann	~1690	Johann David Naumann	1729

==== Füssen ====
Jakob Bayr	~1720

==== Görlitz ====
? Kühn	−1641

==== Günzburg ====
Bartholomaeus Abrel	−1652
Berthin Aberel	−1659
Barthlome Abrell	−1707
Johann Michael Klingensteiner	1707–17??
Johann Klingensteiner	−1765 (Günzburg)
Josef Anton Klingensteiner	~1775 (Günzburg)

==== Haigerloch ====
Steinmeyer family	~1750
Jakob Steinmeyer	1764–
Xaver Steinmeyer	~1779

==== Halle ====
? Fritz	~1747

==== Hamburg ====
? Vicko	1372–1384
Peter Funcke	1384–1402?
? Rosenfeld	~1402
Johann Hagedorn	1471-
Michael Dannenberg	−1485
Klaus Flügge	1485–1488
Hinrich Penningk	1521–1528
Claus Rose	1528–1547
Heinrich Wendeborn	1547–1576
Jürgen Böhme	1576–1612
Max Graf	1612–1621
Valtin Matz	1622–1639
? Gebhart (or Gevert?)	1639-?
Ismael Asthusen I.	1653–1664
Berthold Deutschmann	1664–1674
Jakob Stoeff	1674–1685
Ismael Asthusen II.	1685–1703
Ismael Asthusen III.	1703–1722
Franz Wilhelm Hennings I.	1722-? (1735?)
Ismael Asthusen IV.	17?? (1735?) –1767
Franz Wilhelm Hennigs II.	1767–1773
Franz Wilhelm Hennings III.	1773
Franz Wilhelm Hennings IV.	1773–1790
Franz Wilhelm Hennings V.	1790–1822
Franz Wilhelm Hennings VI.	1822–1830
Raphael Georg Voigt	1830–1852

==== Hannover ====
Johann Hartmann	1818–1831
Johann Voß	−1843
Christian Schwarz	1843–1857 (from 1857 to 1859 Hannover's state executioner; local executioner in Bremen from 1827 to 1860)

==== Heidelberg ====
? Nord	~1812

==== Heilbronn ====
Hans Maurer	~1446 ()

==== Helmstedt ====
? Ingermann	~1609

==== Hof ====
Heinrich Schmidt	16th century (until 1573) (father of Franz Schmidt)
Franz Schmidt	1573–1578 (then he was moving to Nuremberg)

==== Holzen ====
Michael Schiler	−1639

==== Hoya ====
Christian Ludwig Fröhlich	1830–

==== Husum ====
Albert Möller	−1630
Philipp Möller	−1630

==== Kaufbeuren ====
Hans Abril	~1659
Hans Conrad Näher	−1666
Christoph Seitz	~1685
Conrad Fuchs	~1705
Johannes Seitz	~1715
Mattheß Fux	~1720
Johann Seitz	~1732
Johann Michael Weydenkeller	1732–1757
Johann Georg Fux	1773-

==== Kempten ====
Georg Kuisl	~1665
Andreas Klingensteiner	~1701 (Kempten)
? Deigentesch	−1708 (Kempten)

==== Kiel ====
? Pickel (also Bickel)	~1722

==== Königsberg (now Kaliningrad, Russia) ====
Johann Christoph Neumann	1756-

==== Landeck, Silesia (now in Poland ====
? Stein	~1800

==== Lauingen ====
Johann Vollmar	~1652

==== Leipzig ====
Heyland family	1600-
Christoph Hain	~1621
Christoph Heintze	−1695
Polster family	1695-

==== Lentzen ====
Heintze (known as Sohn des Torgauers)	mid-17th century

==== Lindau ====
Johann Näher	1623–1640 / 1650– (1639–1650 in Zürich, Switzerland)

==== Markt Oberdorf ====
Hans Enderes Abrel	~1628
Andreas Kuisl	1655–1678
Wilhelm Kober	−1714
Nikolaus Kober	1714–1763
Wilm Kober	1763–1786
Baptist Trinkler	~1786

==== Memmingen ====
Hans Leycham	1553–1561?
Hans Deibler	1561–1571 (After 1571 til 1594 in Augsburg; ancestor to the French Republic's executioners Louis Deibler and Anatole Deibler)
Jakob Deibler (also Teübler)	1571-
Bartholme Deibler (also Teubler)	1607-
Matheus Fux (also Matheiß Fux)	1656–1696
Conrad Fux	~1696
Johann Fuchs	−1720
Johann Conrad Nejer	~1720
? Widemann	1743–1767
Heinrich Widmann	~1772
Jakob Bickel	~1773
Johann Michael Widemann	~1777
Heinrich Widmann	~1778

==== Munich ====
Martin?	~1760
Martin Hörmann	1813–1841 (Munich)
Lorenz Scheller	1829–1854 (after 1854, Scheller was Bavaria's state executioner)

==== Nördlingen ====
Dietrich Brenner	~1469
Ulrich Tucher	~1515
Conrat Raab	1557–1565
Conrad Fischer	1565–1568
Ulrich Fischer	1568-
Hans Jerg Defner	~1677

==== Nuremberg ====
Hans Wintter	1460–1470
Hans?	~1479
? Gilg	1525
Franz Schmidt (also known as Meister Franz)	1572–1617; was the first executioner to ever write a book about his occupation; deceased 1634)
Bernhard Schlegel	1617–
Valentin Deusser	−1641 (carried out sentences just a few months)
Matthäus Perger	1645-
Johann Michael Widmann	1738–1757 (Nuremberg)

==== Ohlau ====
Andreas Tinel	~1600

==== Öttingen ====
Caspar Vollmer	−1640
Philipp Deibler (also Deubler)	1643–
Johann Fuchs	~1650 (deceased 1672)
Georg Vollmer	1668–
Georg Schöppelen	1690–

==== Passau ====
Kaspar Neithart	~1618

==== Pfaffenhausen ====
Johann Adam Scheller	1718–

==== Regensburg ====
Johann Fuchs	~1720

==== Sangershausen ====
Emanuel Hamel	~1860

==== Schönegg ====
Johann Trenkler	~1722

==== Schongau ====
Jörg Abriel (also Johann Georg Abrellen)	1544–1593
Georg Abrellen	1597–1633
Hans Jakob Kuisl	1683–1696
Hans Kuisl	1711–1734
Jakob Kuisl	1735–
Johann Georg Widmann	1751–1781
Josef Benedikt Kuisl	1783–1807
Johann Michael Kuisl	18??- (Most likely the last executioner for Schongau)

==== Schrobenhausen ====
? Schmidt	~1740

==== Schwabmünchen ====
Jakob Stangel	1583–
Leonhard Tallhover	~1720
? Rörle	−1800

==== Siegburg ====
Hans Hansen	−1638 (called "Meister Hans", "Meister Hansen" and "Doktor Hansen". Hansen, who worked as many other executioners part time also as physician, because he was also called "doktor", carried out a greater number of tortues and executions from 1636 to 1638, when a witch hunt and which trials were ongoing in Siegburg. One of the last, probably the last, victims was Hansen himself.)
? Hansen (known as "Dr. Hansen")	−1694

==== Sonthofen ====
Andreas Kuisl	1678-
Johann Michael Kopp	1703–1753
Johannes Georg Kopp	1753–1801
Remigus Metz	1801–

==== Sponheim ====
Eberhard Schmid	1774-

==== Stuttgart ====
Markus Bickel	1660–
Jakob Bickel
Andreas Bickel
Johannes Bickel	−1691
Adolph Grossholz	~1720 (Stuttgart)

==== Thann in Bavaria ====
? Kester	−1544

==== Torgau ====
? Heintze	before 1695 (father of Leipzig executioner Christoph Heintze)

==== Ulm ====
Hans Conrad Näher	1666-
Dietrich Deigentesch	~1680

==== Waal ====
Johann Georg Igel	−1783
Franz Xaver Igel	1783–

==== Wassertüdingen ====
Carl Fuchs	~1677

==== Weißenhorn ====
two brothers Metz	~1640
Jakob Igel	~1787
Josef Igel	~1798

==== Wittstock ====
Hans? 1537

==== Wrietzen ====
Martin Heintze	~1606

=== State Executioners (from 1848 and 1871 to 1936/37) ===
==== Baden ====
Michael Müller	1854–1886
Franz Müller	1886–1888
Jakob Müller	1888–1908
Karol Wypyszewski	1893–1896 (Baden)
Benjamin Burckhardt	1884–1896 (Baden)
Karl Burckhardt	1896–1935 (state executioner also for Württemberg and Hesse)
Karl Müller	1908– after 1922 (Since 1921 state executioner also for Hesse)
Konrad Widder	1922–1923 (Baden)
Friedrich Hehr	1935–1949 (state executioner also for Württemberg and Hesse, from 1937 on imperial executioner)

==== Bavaria ====
Anton Leisner	−1852
Heinrich Graul	~1852 (Bavarian Palatinate)
Lorenz Scheller	1854–1880
Franz Reichhart	after 1854
? Kisslinger	−1894
Franz Xaver Reichhart	1894–1924 (Bavaria)
Johann Baptist Reichhart	(Bavaria) 1924–1937 (from 1937 on imperial Executioner)

==== Bremen ====
Christian Schwarz	1827–1860 (Unknown when he was nominated from Bremen City's local executioner to Bremen state executioner; from 1843 to 1859 he also was the state's executioner in Hannover)

==== Hannover ====
Christian Schwarz	1857–1859 (from 1843 til 1857 local executioner for Hannover; also local executioner in Bremen from 1827 to 1860)
? Bormann	1859–1870
Julius Krautz	1870–1878 (from 1878 state executioner for Prussia)

=== Hesse ===
Karl Burckhardt	1896–1935 (state executioner also for Baden and Württemberg)
Karl Müller	1921 (from 1908 to after 1922 also state executioner in Baden)
Friedrich Hehr	1935–1949 (state executioner also for Baden and Württemberg, from 1937 on imperial executioner)

==== Prussia ====
Georg Eduard Voigt	1852–
Julius Krautz	1878–1889 (until 1878 state executioner of Hannover)
Friedrich Reindel	1889–1898
Wilhelm Reindel	1899–1901
Alwin Engelhardt	1900–1906 (executioner for once more, and also for Saxony, from 1933 to 1936)
Lorenz Schwietz	1900–1914
Richard Schwietz	1913–1915
Carl Gröpler	1906–1937 (after 1927 executioner also for Saxony)
Paul Spaethe	1912–1924 (1923 also Saxony)
Joseph Kurz (also Kurzer)	1924–1927
Fritz Reichelt	1927–1933
Alwin Engelhardt	1933–1936 (executioner also for Saxony from 1933 to 1936)

==== Saxony ====
? Fritzsche	active in the 1840s and 50s
Otto Oswald Brand	−1885 ()
Moritz Brand	1885–1923/1927
Paul Spaethe	1923–1927 (state executioner for Prussia from 1912 to 1924)
Carl Gröpler	1927–1937 (from 1906 til 1937 executioner also for Prussia)
Alwin Engelhardt	1933–1936 (executioner also for Saxony from 1933 to 1936; executed Martinus van der Lubbe)

==== Württemberg ====
? Schwarz	−1888
? Siller	1888–1926 (Württemberg)
Karl Burckhardt	1896–1935 (state executioner also for Baden and Hesse)
Friedrich Hehr	1935–1949 (state executioner also for Baden and Hesse, from 1937 on imperial executioner)

==== Unknown ====
Hans Kordess	−1918 (according to the New York Times 25 April 1918)

=== Executioners from 1936/37 to 1945 ===
Ernst Reindel	1936–1943 (sources vary about his start)
Johann Baptist Reichhart	(Bavaria) 1937–1945 (from 1924 to 1937 state executioner for Bavaria; from 1945 to 1947 Interim time and Occupation executioner)
Friedrich Hehr	1937–1945 (from 1935 to 1937 state executioner for Baden, Württemberg and Hesse; from 1945 to 1949 Interim time and Occupation executioner)
Karl Burckhardt	1937–1945 (before 1935 state executioner for Baden, Hesse and Württemberg)
Gottlob Bordt	1940–1945
Alfred Roselieb	1941–1945
Wilhelm Friedrich Röttger	1942–1945
Karl Henschke	1943–1945
August Köster	1943–1945
Alois Weiß	1943–1945
Johann Mühl	1943–1945 (from 1946 to 1947 Interim time executioner)
Fritz Witzka	1943–1945

=== Concentration camp executioners (from 1938 to 1945) ===
==== Buchenwald ====
Hermann Helbig
Martin Sommer	1938–1943

==== Westerbork ====
Klaas Faber (−1945)

=== Interim executioners (from 1945 to 1949) ===
Johann Baptist Reichhart	(Bavaria) 1945–1947 (from 1924 to 1937 state executioner for Bavaria; from 1937 to 1945 Imperial executioner; also Occupation executioner with the rope for the American Military justice)
Friedrich Hehr	1945–1949 (from 1935 to 1937 state executioner for Baden, Württemberg and Hesse; from 1937 to 1945 Imperial executioner; after 1946 also Occupation executioner with the rope for the British Military justice)
Johann Mühl	1946–1947 (from 1943 to 1945 Imperial executioner)
Wilhelm Burckhard	1945–1949
Clemens Dobbek	after 1945, "working" in 1947
Horst Schwenke	after 1945–1949 (possibly still nominated/active for Western Berlin after 1949; executed Berthold Wehmeyer 11 May 1949, the last sentence carried out by order of a German court in Germany)
Walter Böttcher after 1945 (from 1949 on executioner in the German Democratic Republic)
Heinz M.	1946–
Clemens Dobbek	– 1949 (after 1949 executioner for Western Berlin)

=== West Germany (1949 to 1951/53) ===
Except for Western Berlin where the Allied did not validate the new German constitution, West Germany had abolished capital punishment 23 May 1949. For West Berlin, the death penalty would still continue in law until 20 January 1951. Despite at least one executioner continued nominated, no death sentences or executions ordered by German courts in that period have been reported so far.

Clemens Dobbek	1949–1951 (before 1949 interim executioner, most likely in West Berlin only)

=== East Germany (1949 to 1987) ===
Walter Böttcher	1949–1960s
Hermann Lorenz	1968–1987 (last execution carried out 25 June 1981)

=== Occupation Executioners (from 1945 to 1992) ===
==== Germans ====
Johann Baptist Reichhart	(Bavaria) 1945–1947 (from 1924 to 1937 state executioner for Bavaria; from 1937 to 1945 German executioner; after 1945 also Interim time executioner with the guillotine for German justice; executed for the US Military justice)
Friedrich Hehr	1946–1952 (from 1935 to 1937 state executioner for Baden, Württemberg and Hesse; from 1937 to 1945 executioner for the German state; after 1945 also interim executioner with the guillotine for German justice
Gustav Völpel	1945–1950 (in 1950 arrested, condemned for burglary and armed robberies and in jail until 1957; executed for the Soviet Military)

==== Americans ====
John Clarence Woods	1944–1946
Joseph Malta	1946–1947

==== British ====
Albert Pierrepoint	1945–1949 (from 1932 to 1941 assistant executioner and then chief executioner until 1956 in England)

== Africa ==
Name	Region/City	Country	Dates	Notes
Huda Ben Amir	Benghazi	Libya	1984–	
Jack Catchpole		Zimbabwe and former Rhodesia	Until 1963	Chief executioner
Edward "Lofty" Milton		Zimbabwe and former Rhodesia	1954 – after 1968	
Barend	Cape of Good Hope	South Africa	1804	
Carolus	Cape of Good Hope	South Africa	1848	
Edward H. von Witt	Cape of Good Hope	South Africa	1860s–1884	
Arthur J. King	Cape of Good Hope	South Africa	1884–1898	
Thomas W. Blake	Cape of Good Hope	South Africa	1898–1910	
Jan Bastiaan Rabie	South African Republic / Transvaal (colony)	South Africa	1890–1891	
Gideon S. Scheepers	South African Republic / Transvaal (colony)	South Africa	1891–	
A.W. Doyle	South African Republic / Transvaal (colony)	South Africa	1902–	
H.M. Driver	South African Republic / Transvaal (colony)	South Africa	1907–1908	
Arthur Simpson	South African Republic / Transvaal (colony)	South Africa	1908–1910	
Thomas W. Blake		South Africa	1911	
William Craig		South Africa	1911	
Christiaan "Chris" Barnard		South Africa	1962–1986	

=== Algeria ===
Zachary Wallace Gross	1843–1856

=== Alger ===
Jacques Baroux	1842–1847 (first name is sometimes given as Joseph)
Nicolas Wolf	1847–1855
Antoine-François-Joseph Rasseneux	1855–1871

=== Monsieur d'Alger: The Executioners of the French Republic ===
In 1870 the Republic of France abolished all local executioners and named the executioner of Algiers, Antoine Rasseneux, Éxécuteur des Arrêts Criminels en Algérie, which became France's official description of the executioner of Algeria's occupation. From then on there would be one only executioner to carry out death sentences for all of Algeria. Since the colony's executioner was required to live in Algiers, people soon started to refer to him as "Le Monsieur d'Alger" ("The Man From Algiers"). Upon his nomination, Rasseneux was permitted to choose four among France's and Algeria's former local executioners to be his aides.

Antoine-François-Joseph Rasseneux	1871–1885
Gustave-Émile Rasseneux	1885–1892
Pierre Lapeyre	1892–1928
Henri Roch	1928–1944
André-Léon Berger	1944–1947
Maurice-Alexandre Meyssonnier	1947–1958 (de facto)/1961 (official)
Fernand-Jean Meyssonnier	1958–1961

=== Egypt ===
Hajj Abd Al-Nabi	(chief executioner; active in 2013)
Hussein Urni	(district executioner; active in 2013)

== Australia ==
=== Australia ===
Alexander Green	Colony of New South Wales	1828–1855
William Tucker	New South Wales	1870–1876
Robert ('Nosey Bob') Howard	New South Wales	1876–1904
Samuel Hudson	Queensland	1900–1905
William Clarke	Queensland	1905–1913

=== New Zealand ===
Tom Long	1877–1908

=== New Caledonia ===
==== Monsieur de la Bagne: The Executioners of the Bagne ====
All executioners of New Caledonia's Bagne were inmates themselves.

Petit	1867–1874
Meyer	1874
Ambarreck	1874–
Henri Brissac	possibly -September 1879 (as a death penalty opposer and Commune de Paris member he was forced to "work" as an aide and most likely to execute later
Guerino	after 1874 or 1879 – before 1882
Ledoux	– c. 1882
Jean-Louis Macé	c. 1882–1905 (nicknamed "Monsieur Nou" by the other inmates; last name also appears as Massé)
Rieusset	1905– (last name also given as Rieussec)
Paturot	active in 1920
? Julian	after 1920
Dalstein	active in 1933
?	unknown Javanese inmate active in 1934
Jugaret	1937–1943 (nicknamed "La Gueule" by the other inmates)

== South America ==
=== Brazil ===
After 1808, during the Portuguese-Brazilian Kingdom (1808–1822) and the Empire (1822–1889), when Brazil's States were still called "Provinces" and the currency was called "Reis", Brazil had factually abolished torture but was a busy death penalty country.
Method of execution was public hanging by an ultra-short drop of approximately 90 cm (2' 9 11/2"), with the executioner, after having activated the trap door or pushed the convict, according to the gallows's structure, climbed a ladder and launched himself rope downwards, hitting on the convict's shoulders with his weight.
Executioners generally were selected among convicts of capital crimes who had their death sentences stayed for indefinite terms or even commuted for life without parole, and who in exchange for their stays or commutations had to carry out the executions ordered by law. Executioners were, whenever possible, selected from among slaves convicted for a capital crime. And except for the province of Rio Grande do Norte, executioners had obligatorily to be of African descent.
As stayed or commuted convicts, executioners consequently lived as inmates in the prisons of the respective towns where they were based. When an execution was to be carried out elsewhere in his area, the executioner would be transported to the place of execution in chains and sleep in the local prison; after an attempt of murder against Fortunato José in 1834, prisons started separating the executioners from other inmates.
In the province of Rio Grande do Norte, the executioner had always to be the convict scheduled to die next after an execution, so that province's last execution had to be carried out by a firing squad, after the necessary emergency change of execution protocol.
In the state of Rio de Janeiro, after Independence 7 September 1822 there were also free executioners of African descent who having to travel around, were reached by couriers with execution orders.
Executioners, also when slaves, were paid for their executions; at the example of the province of Minas Gerais, we can establish payment was between 4$000 and 12$000 (4 Mil-Reis to 12 Mil-Reis) per execution.
The last execution of a free convict in Brazil was that of José Pereira de Sousa 30 October 1861 in Santa Luzia (nowadays Luziânia), GO. The last execution at all under law in Brazil was that of the slave Francisco 28 April 1876 in Pilar, AL.
Brazil abolished capital punishment officially with the Proclamation of the Republic 15 November 1889, and by law with its first Republican Constitution of 1891 and Penal Code of 22 September 1892.

=== French Guiana ===
==== Monsieur de Cayenne: The Executioners of the French Republic ====
Cayenne Central Prison never used its own guillotine. All death sentences of convicts and locally condemned prisoners were conducted at Saint-Laurent.

==== Monsieur de Saint-Laurent-du-Maroni|Saint-Laurent: The Executioners of the Bagne ====
All executioners of Saint-Laurent-du-Maroni were Bagne inmates themselves.

Rasséguier	1860(?)–1889
Louis-Auguste Chaumet	1889–1898/1900
Isidore Hespel	1898–1921 (nicknamed "Le Chacal" by the other inmates)
Bonnefoy	1921–1923 (inmate nr. 42164; nicknamed "Charlot" by the other inmates)
Louis Ladurelle	1923–1937 (his name also appears as Ladurel)
Clouziot	1937–1943 (nicknamed "Mouche à Bœuf" by the other inmates)

=== Bahía ===
==== Salvador ====
José do Egito	1823 (refused to carry out his first and only execution, had his stay lifted for it and died executed himself)

==== Feira de Santana ====
Joaquim Correia	26 September 1849 (voluntary executioner, hanged Lucas da Feira; despite white he was allowed to carry out that one since his father, Francisco Correia, had been one of Lucas's victims)

=== Ceará ===
==== Fortaleza ====
Agostinho Viera	27 April 1825
Francisco Corrêa Pareça	1835–1845 (executed the mutineers of Laura II 22 October 1839, in Fortaleza, CE)

==== Crato ====
Cosme Pereira da Silva (nicknamed "Cosme Cavaco")	1834–1850

==== Sobral ====
Lourenço Nogueira Campos	19th century
Manuel Preto	19th century

=== Minas Gerais ===
==== Ouro Preto ====
Fortunato José	1833–1874 (carried out some executions the State of Rio de Janeiro either).

==== São João del Rei ====
Antônio Resende	1833 – after 1848 (executed the Carrancas insurgents in 1833)

=== Paraná ===
==== Curitiba ====
slave Silvério	active in 1854

=== Pernambuco ===
==== Recife ====
João Paulo de Sousa (nicknamed"João Paulo Sagaz" and "Boca Negra")	16 September 1828 (executioner executed 19 January 1829)
slave Felício (nicknamed: "Farinha Sêca")	4 February 1832
slave Francisco	5 April 1838 (executioner executed 5 September 1838)
nicknamed "Macota"	active in 1844

==== Caruaru ====
Florêncio José Baptista	26 February 1859

=== Rio de Janeiro ===
==== Rio de Janeiro ====
Jerônimo Capitania	active in 1792 – executed Joaquim José da Silva Xavier (Tiradentes) 21 April 1792
Ananias	active in 1850 – executed also in Espírito Santo, including two of the Queimado Insurrection leaders, Chico Prego and João da Viúva in Serra, ES

=== Rio Grande do Sul ===
==== Porto Alegre ====
slave Manoel	nominated 12 January 1822, by commutuation of his death sentence

== Sources ==
Books

- Anderson, Patrick R.: "Expert witnesses: Criminologists in the Courtroom".|Albany: State University of New York, 1987
- Armand, Frédéric: Les Bourreaux en France: Du Moyen-Âge à l'Abolition de la Peine de Mort. Paris (75): Éditions Perrin, 2012
- Delarue, Jacques: Le Métier de Bourreau: Du Moyen Âge à Aujourd'hui. Paris (75): Fayard, 1979
- Evans, Richard J.: Rituals of Retribution: Capital Punishment in Germany, 1600–1987. Oxford: Oxford University Press, 1996; London: Penguin Books, 1997
- Goulart, José Alípio: Da Palmatória ao Patíbulo: Castigos de Escravos no Brasil. Rio de Janeiro, RJ: Editora Conquista, 1971
- Koch, Tankred: Die Geschichte der Henker: Scharfrichterschicksale aus acht Jahrhunderten. Heidelberg: Kriminalistikverlag, 1988; Herrsching: Manfred-Pawlak-Verlagsgesellschaft, 1991
- Lachance, André: Le Bourreau au Canada sous le Régime Français. Québec, QC: Société historique de Québec, 1966
- Martschukat, Jürgen: Inszeniertes Töten: Eine Geschichte der Todesstrafe vom 17. bis zum 19. Jahrhundert. Köln: Böhlau, 2000; Hamburg: 2006
- Nowosadtko, Jutta: Scharfrichter und Abdecker: Der Alltag zweier "unehrlicher Berufe" in der Frühen Neuzeit. Paderborn: 1994
- Ribeiro, João Luiz: No Meio das Galinhas as Baratas Não Têm Razão: A Lei de 10 de Junho de 1835 – Os Escravos e a Pena de Morte no Império do Brasil 1822–1889. Rio de Janeiro, RJ: Renovar, 2005.
- Rossa, Kurt: Todesstrafen: Von den Anfängen bis heute. Bergisch-Gladbach: Bastei-Lübbe-Verlag, 1979
- Streib, Victor L.: The Fairer Death: Executing Women in Ohio. Athens, OH: Ohio University Press, 2006
- Welsh-Huggins, Andrew: No Winners Here Tonight: Race, Politics, and Geography in One of the Country's Busiest Death Penalty States. Athens, OH: Ohio University Press, 2009

Magazine sources

Newspaper Sources

- "1985 Contract Hoods Identity of Pennsylvania Executioner", Philadelphia Daily News, 28 August 1990

== See also ==
- Capital punishment
- Electric chair
- Gas chamber
- Guillotine
- Hanging
- Lethal injection

== Sources ==
- Bleakley, Horace (1929). The Hangmen of England: How They Hanged and Whom They Hanged, The Life Story of "Jack Ketch" through two Centuries. London: Chapman and Hall.
