= HM Prison Shepton Mallet =

Former prison in Shepton Mallet, UK

Coordinates: 51°11′26″N 2°32′36″W

Shepton Mallet Prison
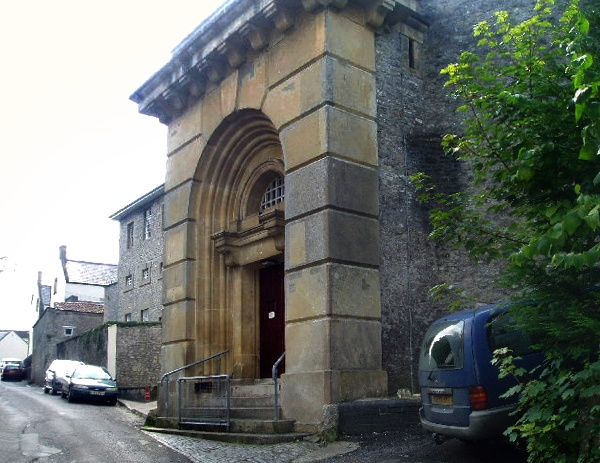
- Interactive map of Shepton Mallet Prison
- Location: Shepton Mallet, Somerset
- Status: Open to the public
- Security class: Adult Male/Category C Lifer
- Opened: 1625
- Closed: 2013
- Managed by: The Campbell Group
- Governor: Andrew P.P. Rogers
- Website: https://www.sheptonmalletprison.com

HMP Shepton Mallet, sometimes known as Cornhill, is a former prison in Shepton Mallet, Somerset, England. When it closed in 2013, it had been the United Kingdom's oldest operating prison, following the closure of HMP Lancaster Castle in 2011. Before closure, Shepton Mallet was a category C lifer prison holding 189 prisoners. The prison building is Grade II* listed, while the former gatehouse and perimeter walls are Grade II.

The prison was opened before 1625 but was already in poor repair by the end of the First English Civil War in 1646. It was expanded in 1790 but conditions were again criticised in a report of 1822 and further building work was undertaken in the 1820s and 1830s. This included the installation of a treadwheel for those sentenced to hard labour. In 1843 the number of cells was increased by adding a second storey to each wing. The prison was damaged during a fire in 1904. In 1930 the number of inmates had fallen and the prison was closed.

Following the outbreak of the Second World War in 1939, the prison was reopened as a military prison. It was initially used by the British Army and later by American forces who constructed a new execution block to hang condemned prisoners. It was also used for the storage of important historical documents from the Public Record Office in London, including the Domesday Book of 1086. Following the war the prison continued as a military "glasshouse" until it was returned to civilian use in 1966.

The prison was decommissioned in 2013 and now serves as a tourist attraction, with guided tours and other activities.

== History prior to the Second World War ==
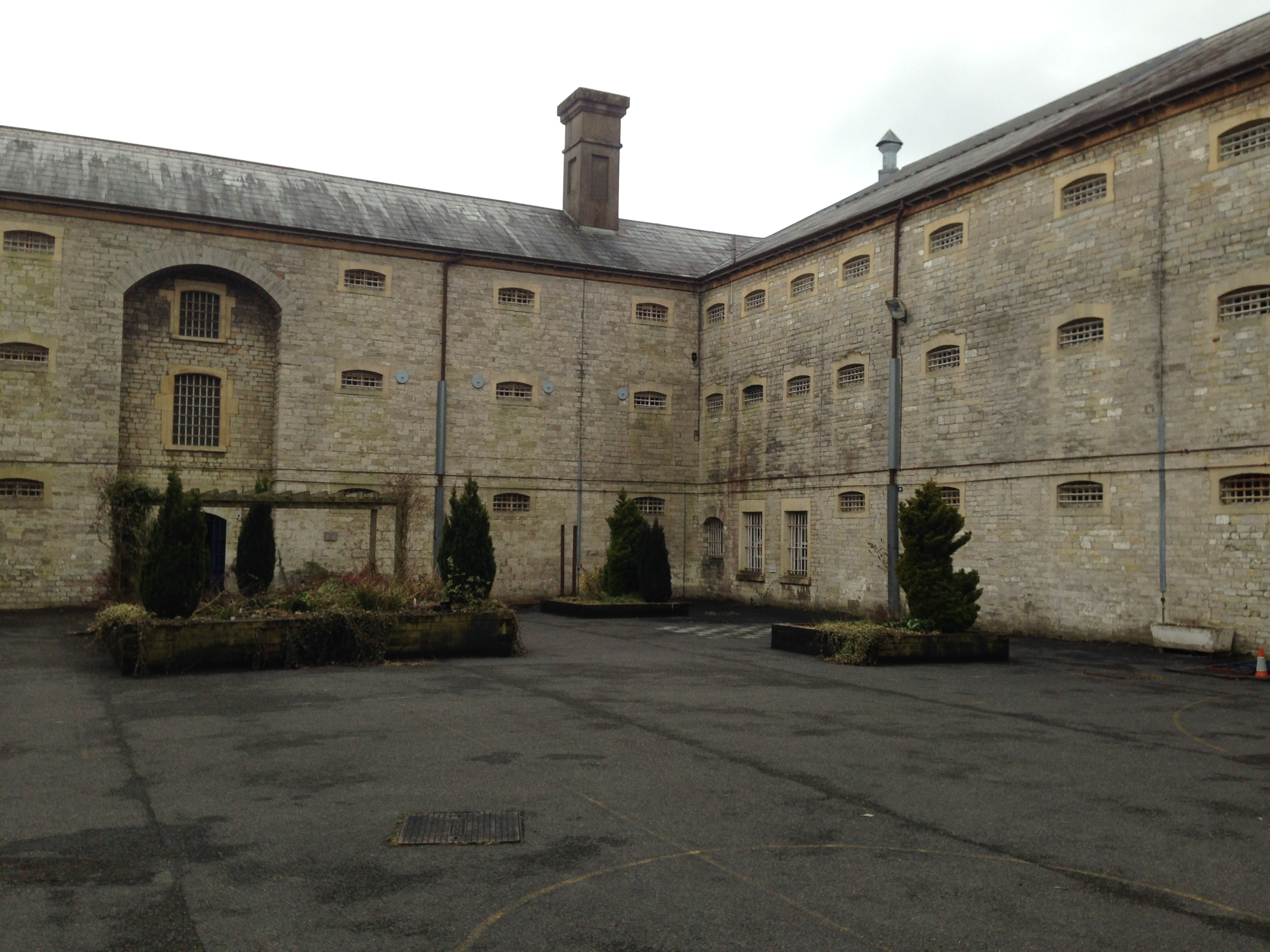
The exercise yard

=== 17th and 18th centuries ===
The prison was established as a house of correction in 1625 to comply with the 1610 Bridewell Act of King James I requiring that every county have such a house. The building and surrounding land of 1 acre (0.40 ha) was bought from the Reverend Edward Barnard for £160. In the 17th century Shepton Mallet was not the only place of imprisonment in Somerset: the County Gaol was in Ilchester; there was another house of correction at Ilchester; and one at Taunton.

At the time all prisoners – men, women and children – were held together in reportedly dreadful conditions. The gaoler was not paid, instead making an income from fees from his prisoners; for example, for providing them with liquor. By the end of the First English Civil War in 1646 the house of correction was described as being in poor repair. During the Bloody Assizes following the Monmouth Rebellion at least 12 local men were held at the gaol before being hanged, drawn and quartered at the Market Cross.

In 1773, a commissioner appointed by Parliament to inspect prisons around the country reported that sanitation at Shepton Mallet House of Correction was extremely poor. He said:

Many who went in healthy are in a few months changed to emaciated, dejected objects. Some are seen pining under diseases, expiring on the floors, in loathsome cells, of pestilential fevers, and the confluent smallpox. Victims, I will not say to cruelty, but I must say to the inattention of the Sheriffs, and Gentlemen in the commission of peace. The cause of this distress is, that many prisons are scantily supplied, and some almost totally unprovided with the necessaries of life.

— John Howard's report to Parliament, 1773

In 1790 additional land was purchased to extend the prison, and around this time men and women began to be held in separate areas. Further extensions were carried out from 1817 to 1822, with the prison holding about 200 prisoners.

=== 19th century ===
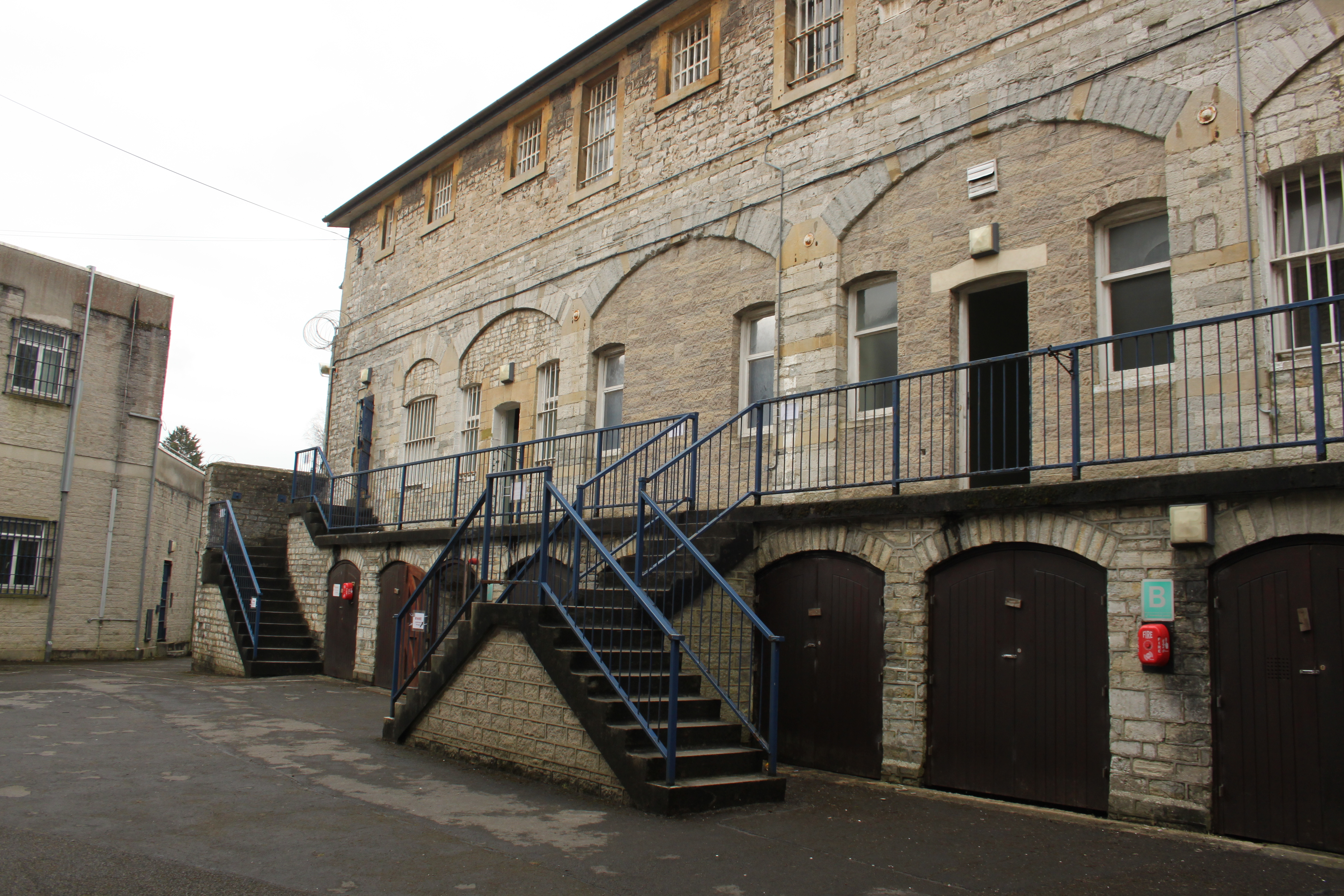
The treadwheel was in the ground floor of this building.

A report into the state of prisons in Somerset by Sir John Hippisley of Ston Easton Park in 1822 criticised the conditions in which prisoners were held. He proposed a five-year plan to expand the prison at a cost of £5,000.

In 1823, a large treadwheel, designed by William Cubitt and built by Stotherts of Bath, later Stothert & Pitt, was installed within the prison, in the 1840s Stotherts were contracted as engineers to build the new Bath City Gaol in Twerton, and later went on to build the treadwheel at that prison. The building for the treadwheel and other new buildings were designed by George Allen Underwood. Men who had been sentenced to hard labour would serve their punishment on this. 40 men would tread the wheel for many hours at a time, a punishment which was recorded as causing hernias in some convicts. The wheel was used to power a grain mill situated outside the prison wall. The wheel remained in use until 1890. Other prisoners were engaged in breaking stones which were used for roadbuilding, oakum picking (unpicking old ropes) and other tasks.

Further building work to designs by Richard Carver, the county surveyor, was undertaken in the 1830s and 1840s. This included the rebuilding of the front range and the addition of the gatehouse. The chapel was built in 1840. The wings were adapted and a second storey added to each one. Additional building work completed the enclosure of the quadrangle or exercise yard.

In 1842 inspectors appointed by the government reported that Shepton Mallet prison was:

in greatest want of new cells for the purpose of dividing the prisoners from each other ... In number 11 of Ward 8, no less than eight men have slept in the same room in company from January to September, 1841, although in this very room there are only six bedsteads. Boards are brought in and placed on the floor when the bedsteads are not sufficiently numerous.

— Report of Her Majesty's Inspectorate, 1842

Ilchester Gaol closed in 1843, with the inmates being transferred to Shepton Mallet and Taunton. In 1845 the prison was recorded as holding 270 prisoners. By 1897 the population was only 61, overseen by a governor, three warders, six assistant warders and a night watchman. Other staff included a chaplain and assistant chaplain, a surgeon, a matron and a school master. In 1884 it was designated as the county gaol for Somerset under the Prison Act 1877.

==== The Bristol "baby farmer", 1879 ====
Notorious Bristol "baby farmer" Amelia Dyer spent six months at Shepton Mallet Prison. Her trial was held at Long Ashton on 29 August 1879, and two newspapers report the summing-up of the judge, stating that she would reflect on her actions behind the walls of Shepton Mallet Gaol, for the period of six months under hard labour. Although the court was close to the centre of Bristol, it was within the jurisdiction of Somerset, hence her time at Shepton Mallet as opposed to Bristol Prison. She was charged with failing to have the necessary permissions or licence for the maintenance of children, and for attempted suicide. She was acquitted on the latter charge.

=== 1904 fire ===
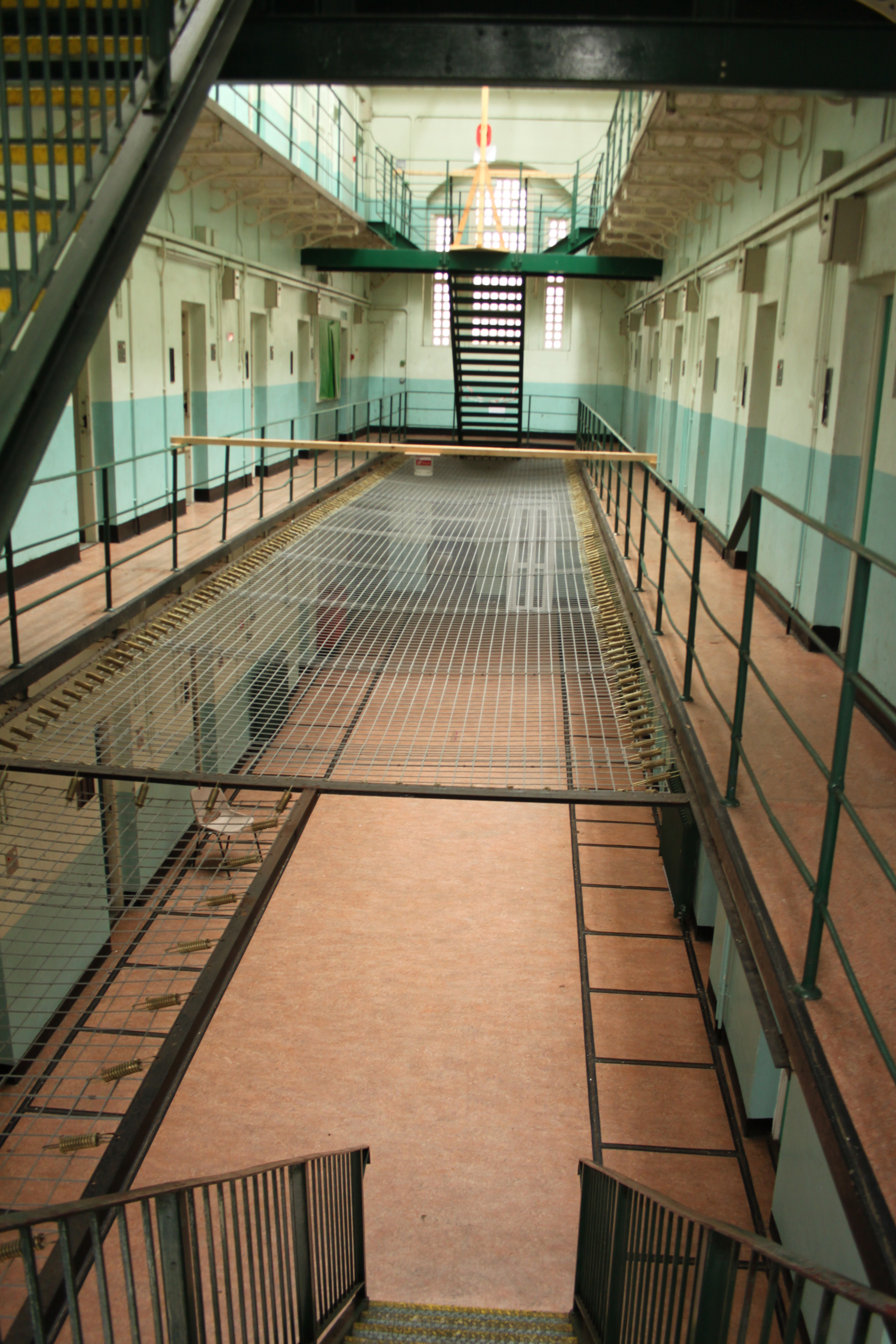
C wing, 2018

At 10:15 pm on Saturday 2 July 1904 a fire, believed to have been started by a prisoner about half an hour earlier, was discovered in C block. The alarm was raised by the ringing of the prison bell and the prisoners were evacuated to the prison chapel. Within ten minutes the town fire brigade, which was provided by the Anglo-Bavarian Brewery, was in attendance. They were joined at about midnight by the Wells brigade and at about 3:00 am by the Frome and Glastonbury brigades. The fire had spread quickly within C block and was fought by prisoners, warders and firemen working together; prisoners helped to man the hoses and worked the fire engine pumps in shifts.

Despite the opportunity offered by the disruption, no prisoner attempted to escape. There were no fatalities as a result of the fire, and no major injuries. Whilst contemporary photographs show that the roof of C block was substantially destroyed, the building itself, being constructed of stone and concrete, remained nearly intact. Consequently it was not necessary to transfer any prisoners to other jails.

=== Closure in 1930 ===
In 1930 the Prisoner Commissioners recommended to the Government that Shepton Mallet Prison should be closed because it was under-used, having an average population in previous years of only 51 inmates. The prison closed in September of that year, with the prisoners and some of the staff transferring to other jails in neighbouring counties. The prison remained empty except for a caretaker until the outbreak of the Second World War.

=== Civilian executions ===
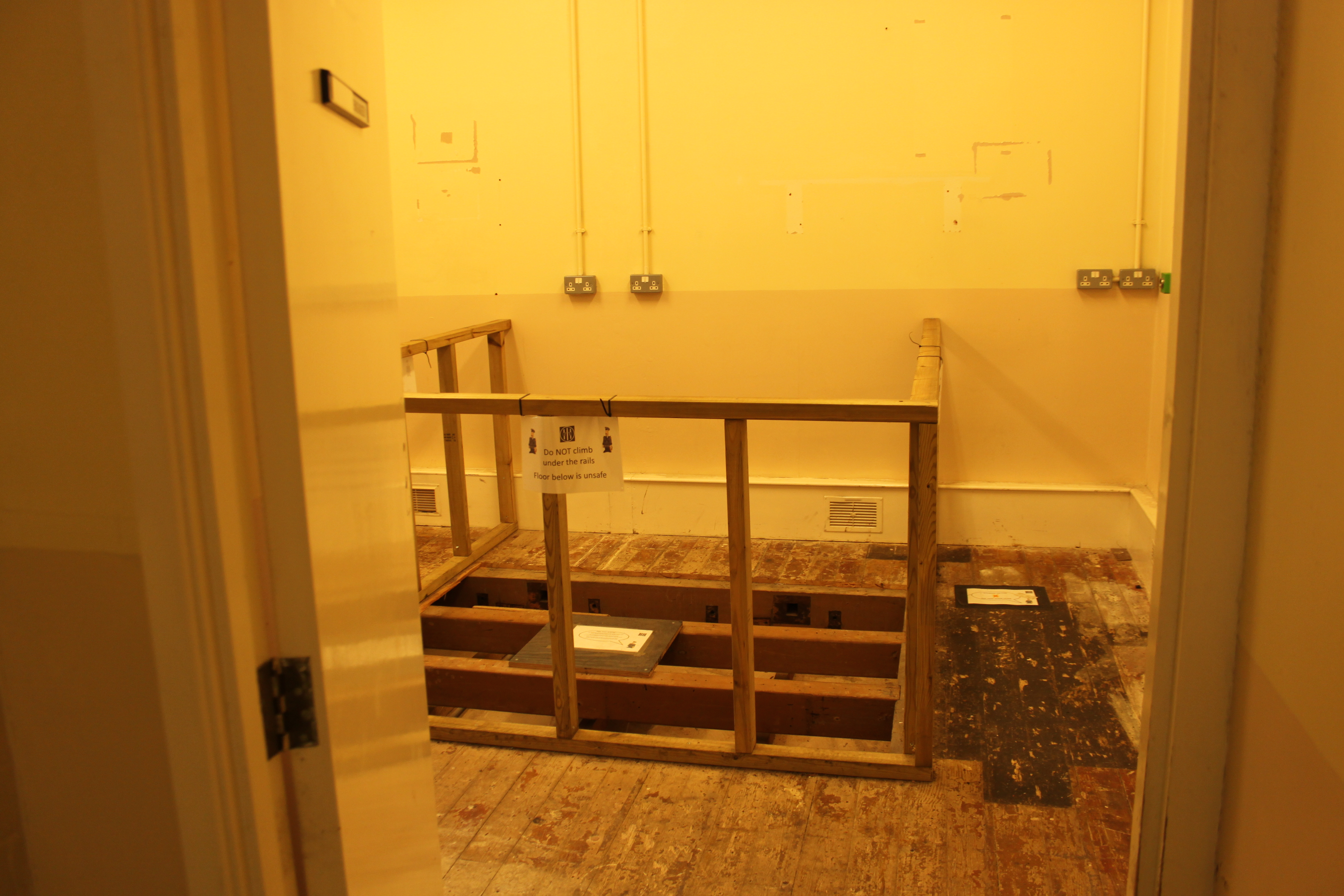
The execution room, 2018

The total number of executions at Shepton Mallet in its early years is unknown. Seven judicial executions took place within the prison walls between 1889 and 1926:

- Samuel Rylands (or Reylands), aged 23, was hanged on 13 March 1889. He was convicted at the Assize Courts in Taunton, Somerset on 20 February 1889 for battering to death 10-year-old Emma Jane Davies at Yeabridge, Somerset on 2 January 1889.
- Henry (Harry) Dainton, aged 35, was hanged on 15 December 1891 by hangman James Billington. He was convicted for drowning his wife in the River Avon.
- Charles Squires, aged 28, was hanged on 10 August 1893 by James Billington. He was convicted at the Assize Courts in Wells, Somerset for smothering to death his wife's two-year-old illegitimate son.
- Henry Quartly (or Quartley), aged 55, was hanged on 10 November 1914 by hangmen Thomas Pierrepoint and George Brown. He was convicted at the Assize Courts in Taunton, Somerset on 20 October 1914 for fatally shooting 59-year-old Henry Pugsley at Parson Street, Porlock, Somerset on 3 June 1914.
- Verney Asser, a 30-year-old Australian soldier of the 2nd Training Battalion, was hanged on 5 March 1918 by John Ellis and William Willis. He was convicted at the Assize Courts in Devizes, Wiltshire on 16 January 1918 for fatally shooting his roommate 24-year-old Corporal Joseph Harold Durkin at Sutton Veny Camp on Salisbury Plain, Wiltshire on 27 November 1917.
- William Grover Bignell, aged 32, was hanged on 24 February 1925 by Thomas Pierrepoint and Robert Baxter. He was convicted at the Assize Courts in Devizes, Wiltshire on 20 January 1925 for fatally cutting the throat of his 37-year-old girlfriend Margaret Legg in a field near Tetbury, Gloucestershire on 25 October 1924.
- John Lincoln (a.k.a. Ignatius Emanuel Napthali Trebich Lincoln), aged 23, was hanged on 2 March 1926 by Thomas Pierrepoint and Lionel Mann. He was convicted at the Assize Courts in Devizes, Wiltshire on 21 January 1926 for fatally shooting 25-year-old Edward Richards at Victoria Avenue, Trowbridge, Wiltshire on 24 December 1925.

Their remains were buried in unmarked graves within the walls of the prison, as was customary following British executions.

== Use during the Second World War ==
The prison was reopened for British military use in October 1939. It soon housed 300 men from all three armed services, with some having to live in huts in the prison yard.

In November 1940 three British soldiers, who were incarcerated in room 142 close to the B1 landing died of asphyxiation/carbon monoxide poisoning. Another soldier, also held in the same room survived. The names of the soldiers who died were Frank Girvan (of Fife), Glen Roy Williams (Bridgend) and Harold Smith (Manchester).

=== Public Records storage ===
With the outbreak of war the prison also took into protective storage many important historical documents from the Public Record Office in London, including the Domesday Book, the logbooks of HMS Victory, the Olive Branch Petition (1775), and dispatches from the Battle of Waterloo. In all about 300 tons of records were transported to Shepton Mallet. Some documents, but not Domesday Book, were moved out of Shepton Mallet on 5 July 1942 due to concern at the concentration of important items being held in one place, especially with German bombs falling on nearby Bath and Bristol. During their time at Shepton Mallet the archives were still able to be accessed. The archives were returned to London after the end of the war, between 10 July 1945 and 1 February 1946.

=== American military use ===
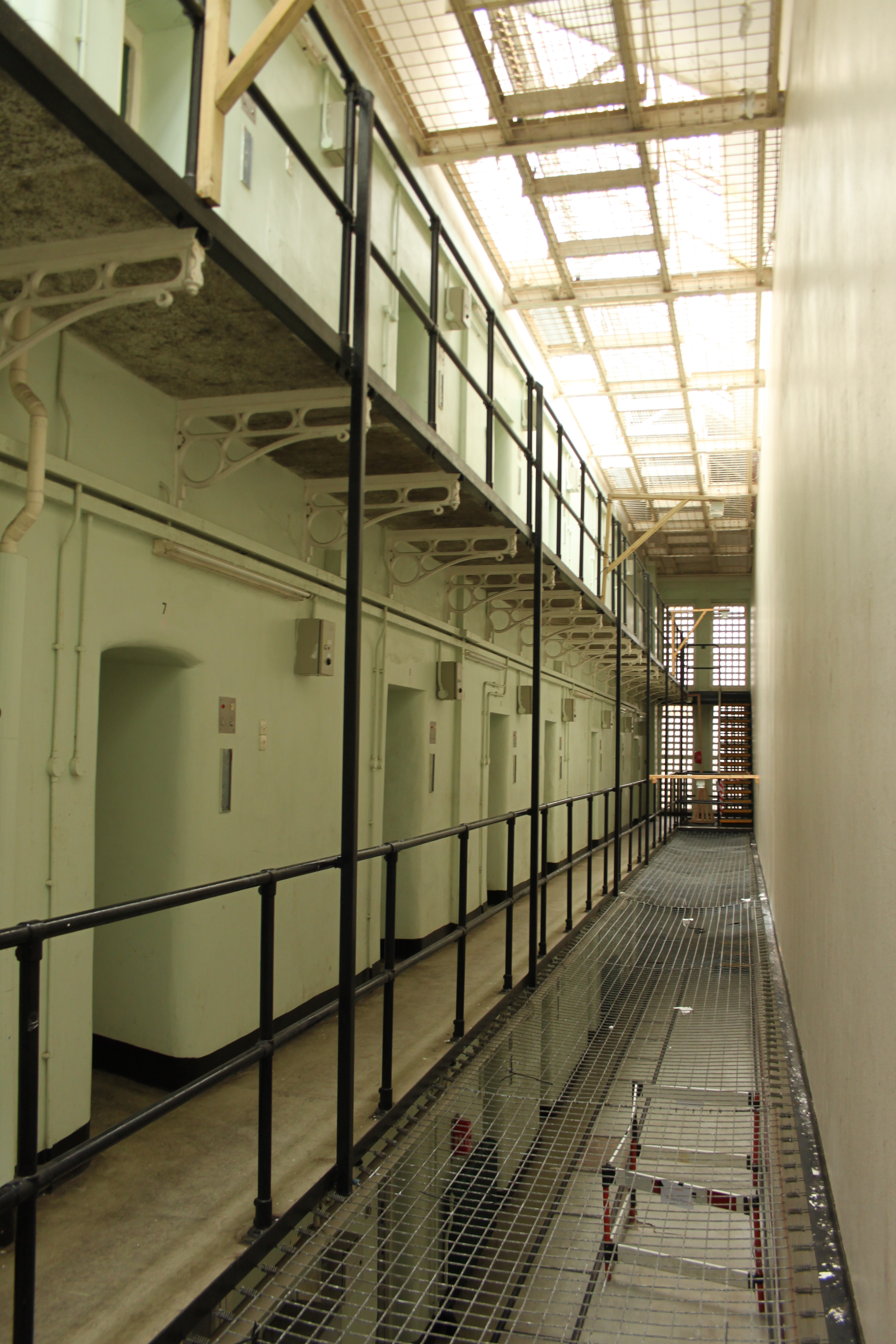
'A' wing, 2018

Between mid-1942 and September 1945 the prison was used by the American military as the "6833rd Guardhouse Overhead Detachment", later "The Headquarters 2912th Disciplinary Training Center – APO 508 United States Army". The prison was entirely staffed by American military personnel during this period. The first commandant was Lieutenant Colonel James P. Smith of the 707th Military Police Battalion.

At times during its use by the Americans, Shepton Mallet held many more men than it had before. At the end of 1944 there were 768 soldiers imprisoned, guarded by 12 officers and 82 enlisted men.

=== American military executions ===
Under the provisions of the United States of America (Visiting Forces) Act 1942, 18 American servicemen were executed at the prison: sixteen were hanged in the execution block and two were shot by a firing squad in the prison yard. Three of the hangings were double executions, i.e. two condemned prisoners stood together on the gallows and were executed simultaneously when the trap-door opened.

Of the 18 men executed, eight were convicted of murder, six of rape (which had not been a capital offence in the United Kingdom since 1841), and four of both crimes. A 2003 Channel 4 film claimed that a disproportionate number of black soldiers were executed: although the U.S. military was 90% white, 10 of the 18 men executed there were black and three were Hispanic.

The Americans constructed a small, two-storey building containing a gallows (of identical design to those used in British prisons) adjoining one of the prison wings. The flat-roofed execution block has a single window. There is an external wooden door on the ground floor which gives access to the area underneath the trapdoor, and it was through this door that the bodies of executed prisoners were removed. The barred steel mortuary door, located below C wing, directly faces the external wooden door to the execution block. The execution block is sandwiched tightly between two much larger buildings, close to the rear of the prison. It is made of red brick, whereas the rest of the prison is constructed from stone.

The executioner at most of the hangings was Thomas William Pierrepoint, assisted mainly by his more-famous nephew Albert Pierrepoint, though some other assistant executioners were used, e.g. Alex Riley and Herbert Morris. Executions by hanging took place after midnight, at around 1:00 am. Albert Pierrepoint is known to have disapproved of the Americans' practice of reading out to the condemned man as he stood on the trap-door the details of his offence and sentence, then allowing him to make a final statement. He said:

The part of the routine which I found it hardest to acclimatise myself to was the, to me, sickening interval between my introduction to the prisoner and his death. Under British custom I was working to the sort of timing where the drop fell between eight and twenty seconds after I had entered the condemned's cell. Under the American system, after I had pinioned the prisoner, he had to stand on the drop for perhaps six minutes while his charge sheet was read out, sentence spelt out, and he was asked if he had anything to say, and after that I was instructed to get on with the job.

— Albert Pierrepoint, Home Office Executioner

The names and dates of American military executions are as follows:

- Private David Cobb, a 21-year-old soldier from Dothan, Alabama, was hanged on 12 March 1943 by Thomas Pierrepoint and Albert Pierrepoint. He was convicted by a general court martial at Cambridge for fatally shooting Second Lieutenant Robert J. Cobnor at the 827th Engineer Battalion ordnance depot, Desborough, in Northamptonshire, on 27 December 1942.
- Private Harold A. Smith, a native of Troup County, Georgia, was hanged on 25 June 1943 by Thomas Pierrepoint and Albert Pierrepoint. He was convicted by a court martial at Bristol for fatally shooting Private Henry Jenkins of the 116th Infantry at Chisledon Camp, near Swindon in Wiltshire on 9 January 1943.
- Private Lee A. Davis, a 22-year-old soldier, was hanged on 14 December 1943 by Thomas Pierrepoint and Alex Riley. He was convicted by a court martial at Marlborough, Wiltshire for fatally shooting 19-year-old Cynthia June Lay and raping Muriel Fawden near Savernake Hospital, Marlborough on 28 September 1943.
- Private John H. Waters, a 38-year-old soldier from Perth Amboy, New Jersey, was hanged on 10 February 1944 by Thomas Pierrepoint and Alex Riley. He was convicted by a court martial at Watford in Hertfordshire for fatally shooting his 35-year-old girlfriend Doris Staples at 11A Greys Road, Henley-on-Thames in Oxfordshire on 14 July 1943.
- Private John C. Leatherberry, a 21-year-old soldier, serving with the 356th Engineer General Service Regiment, was hanged on 16 March 1944 by Thomas Pierrepoint and Albert Pierrepoint. He was convicted by a court martial at Ipswich in Suffolk for strangling and battering to death 28-year-old taxi-driver Henry Claude Hailstone in a country lane south west of Colchester in Essex on 8 December 1943. Leatherberry's accomplice, Private George Fowler, was sentenced to life imprisonment.
- Private Wiley Harris Jr., a 25-year-old soldier, serving with the 626th Ordnance Ammunition Corp, was hanged on 26 May 1944 by Thomas Pierrepoint and Alex Riley. He was convicted by a court martial for stabbing to death Harry Coogan, a pimp, at Earl Street in Belfast, Northern Ireland on 6 March 1944.
- Private Alex F. Miranda, a 20-year-old soldier, was executed on 30 May 1944 by a 10-man firing squad. He was convicted by a court martial for fatally shooting First Sergeant Thomas Evison of the 42nd Field Artillery Battalion, 4th Division, at Broomhill Camp in Devon on 5 March 1944. Initially buried in Plot E, Oise-Aisne American Cemetery and Memorial (see below), his body was returned to the U.S. in 1990.
- Private Eliga Brinson and Private Willie Smith, both of the 4090th Quartermaster Service Company, were hanged on 11 August 1944 by Thomas Pierrepoint and Albert Pierrepoint. They were convicted by a court martial at Cheltenham in Gloucestershire for raping Dorothy Holmes in a field near Bishop's Cleeve in Gloucestershire on 4 March 1944.
- Private Madison Thomas, a 23-year-old soldier, was hanged on 12 October 1944 by Thomas Pierrepoint and Albert Pierrepoint. He was convicted by a court martial at Plymouth in Devon for raping Beatrice Maud Reynolds in a field at Albaston, near Gunnislake in Cornwall on 26 July 1944.
- Private Benjamin Pyegate from Dillon, South Carolina, was executed on 28 November 1944 by a firing squad. He was convicted by a court martial at Tidworth in Wiltshire for stabbing to death Private First Class James E. Alexander, from Arkansas, at the Drill Hall Camp, Westbury, Wiltshire on 17 June 1944.
- Corporal Ernest Lee Clarke (aged 23) and Private Augustine M. Guerra (aged 20), both airmen of the 306th Fighter Control Squadron, were hanged on 8 January 1945 by Thomas Pierrepoint and Albert Pierrepoint. They were convicted by a court martial at Ashford, Kent for raping and strangling to death 15-year-old Elizabeth Green at Ashford on 22 August 1944.
- Corporal Robert L. Pearson and Private Parson Jones, both soldiers of the 1698th Engineers, were hanged on 17 March 1945 by Thomas Pierrepoint and Herbert Morris. They were convicted by a court martial at Chard, Somerset for raping heavily pregnant Joyce Brown at Bonfire Orchard in Chard on 3 December 1944.
- Private William Harrison, a 22-year-old soldier of the United States Army Air Forces, was hanged on 7 April 1945 by Thomas Pierrepoint and Herbert Morris. Based at USAAF Station 238 in Ardboe, he was tried by a court martial at Cookstown Courthouse on 18 November 1944, accused of sexually assaulting and strangling to death 7-year-old Patricia Wylie in a hayfield at Killycolpy, near Stewartstown, County Tyrone in Northern Ireland on 25 September 1944. He admitted to murdering the child and was convicted. Harrison's execution was botched, and rather than dying rapidly, he was strangled to death over a period of 20 minutes.
- Private George Edward Smith, a 28-year-old airman of the 784th Bombardment Squadron, was hanged on 8 May 1945 (i.e. VE Day) by Thomas Pierrepoint and Herbert Morris. He was convicted by a court martial at RAF Attlebridge in Norfolk for fatally shooting 60-year-old Sir Eric Teichman in woods near Honingham Hall, Honingham in Norfolk on 3 December 1944.
- Private Aniceto Martinez, a 23-year-old soldier, was hanged on 15 June 1945 by Thomas Pierrepoint and Albert Pierrepoint. He was convicted by a court martial at Lichfield in Staffordshire for raping 74-year-old Agnes Cope in her home at 15 Sandy Lane, Rugeley in Staffordshire on 6 August 1944. He was the last person to be hanged in the United Kingdom for the crime of rape.

Initially, the remains of American prisoners executed at Shepton Mallet were interred in unmarked graves at "Plot X" in Brookwood Cemetery, Surrey. Plot X was in a distant corner of the cemetery, away from the other plots and next to toolsheds and a compost heap. Executed prisoners interred there were not given coffins, but were put into cotton mattress covers and buried in individual graves under numbered markers. Plot X had room for one hundred graves and was the first effort to segregate executed Army prisoners from those who had been killed in combat.

In 1949, all eighteen bodies were exhumed. The remains of David Cobb were repatriated to his home town of Dothan, Alabama. The remaining 17 were reburied in Plot E at Oise-Aisne American Cemetery and Memorial in France. Plot E is a private section intended for the "dishonoured dead" which lies across the road from the main cemetery. Visits to Plot E are not encouraged. Public access is difficult because the area is concealed, surrounded by bushes, and is closed to visitors. In any case, all the grave markers in Plot E bear only numbers (not names), which makes identification of individual soldiers impossible without the key. The US government published a list identifying the occupants of each grave in 2009.

=== British military use ===
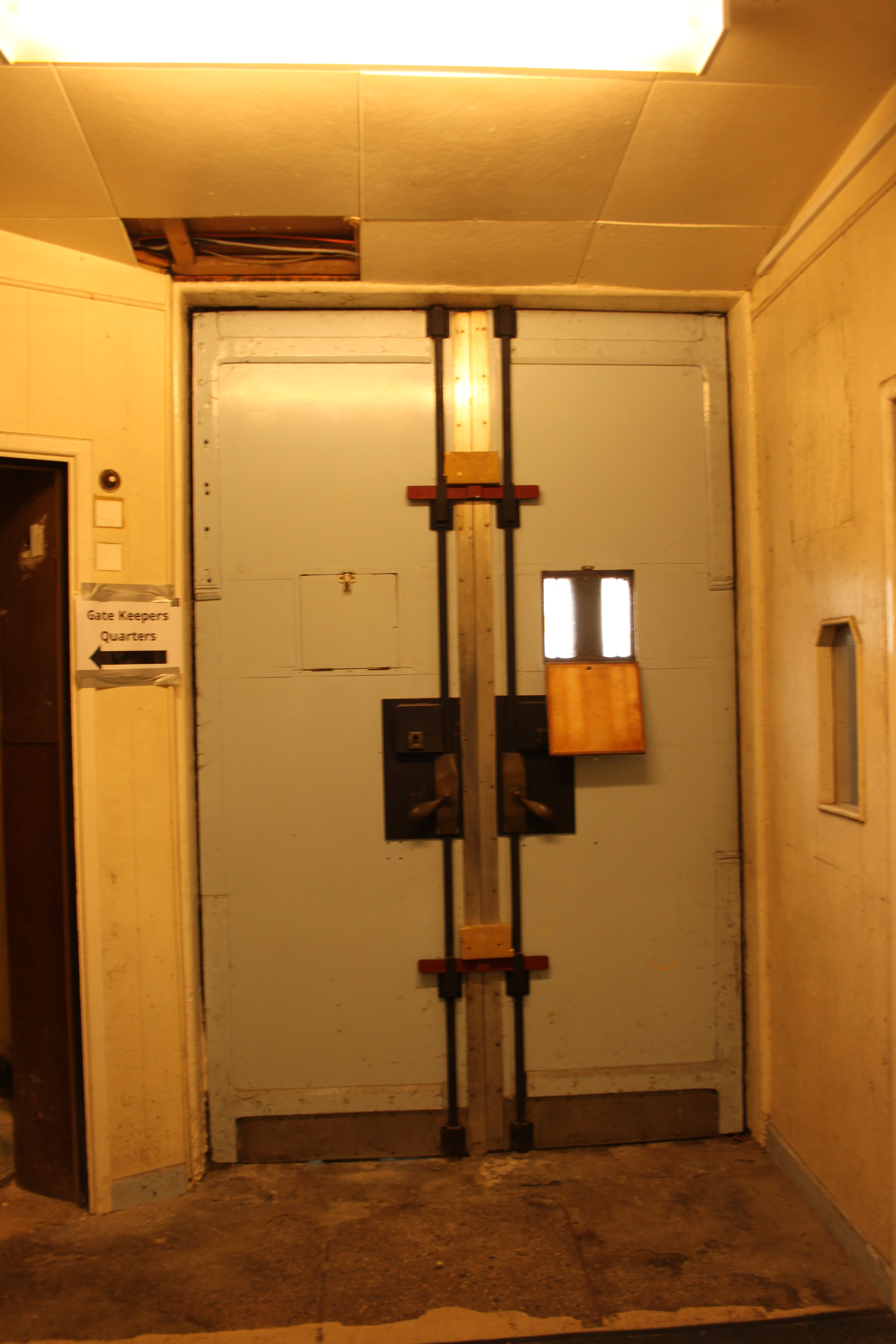
The inside of the main entrance

In September 1945, the prison was once again taken over by the British Army and became a British military prison ("glasshouse") for service personnel. It was used for soldiers who were going to be discharged after serving their sentence, provided that sentences were less than two years. (If more than two years, the sentence was served in a civilian prison.)

Amongst the soldiers held here were the Kray twins who, while serving out their national service in the gaol after absconding, met Charlie Richardson. Discipline was strict and the punishments meted out to prisoners were reportedly extremely severe. On 10 March 1959 a riot (officially termed a mutiny) began in the dining hall. Thirteen soldiers were subsequently tried by court martial, and five were sentenced to three years' imprisonment; the remainder were acquitted.

== Civilian use ==
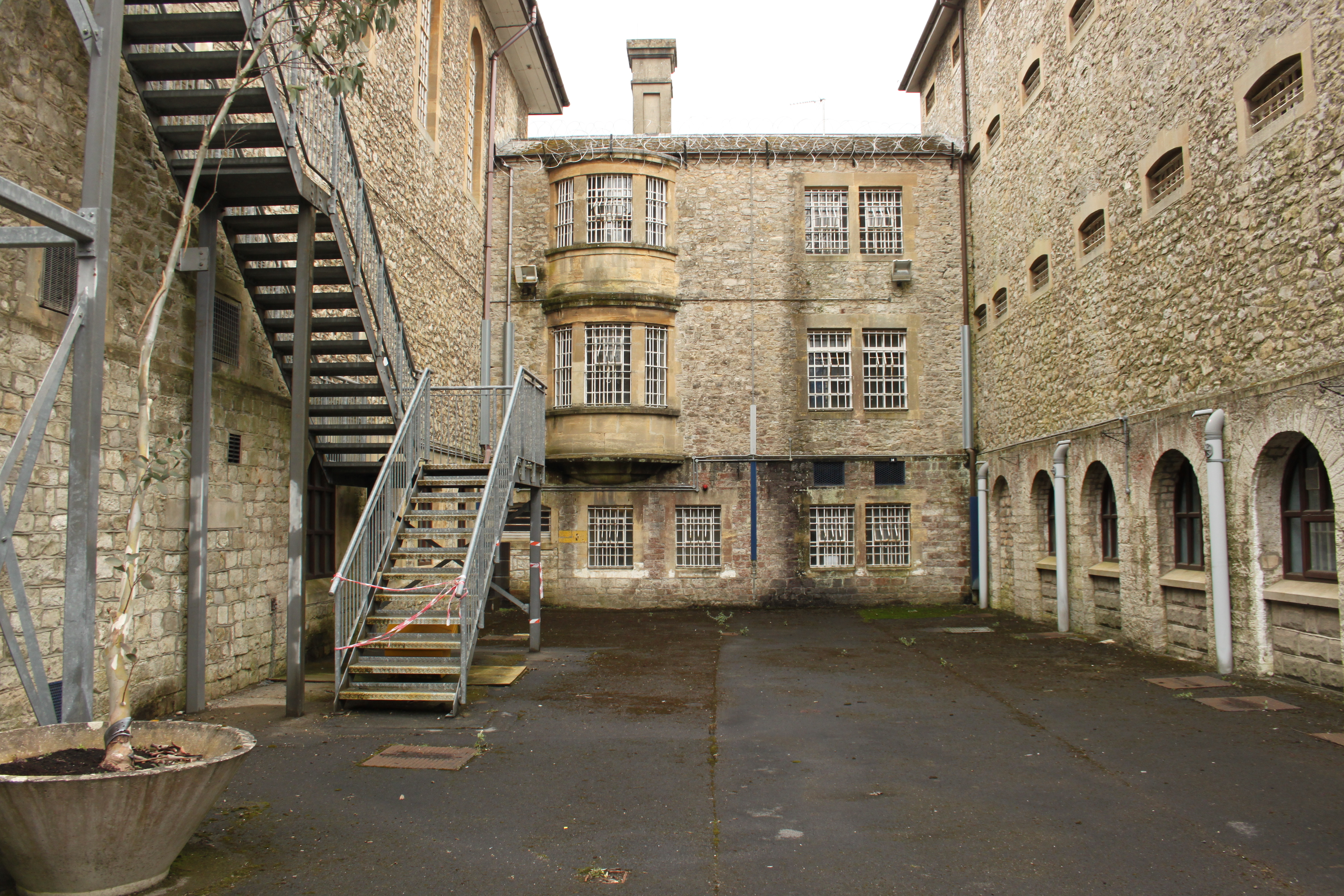
Between C wing and the visitors room

The prison was returned to civilian use in 1966. It was initially used to house prisoners who, for their own protection, could not be housed with 'run-of-the-mill' prisoners, and also for well-behaved first offenders.

The gallows in the execution block was removed in 1967 and the room became the prison library. A new kitchen, boiler room, chapel and education block was added.

In 1973, Shepton Mallet became a training prison for men serving sentences of less than four years. The aim was to provide the inmates with the education and skills necessary for them to become productive members of society after their release. There were now about 260 prisoners who worked in a range of workshops, including plastic moulding, tailoring and scrap metal recovery. Some also worked outside the prison (some unsupervised), for example in the local park or churchyard, on local farms or at the Babycham cider mill.

In the 1980s the prison held prisoners who had been in prison several times before and had not reformed. Around this time the population continued to be 260 living in accommodation designed for 169. In 1991, Shepton Mallet took its first category 'C' life prisoners – those nearing the end of their sentences. The maximum number of prisoners to be held in the prison was fixed at 211.

In 1992, the Chief Inspector of Prisons, Judge Stephen Tumim, issued a report which said:

We doubt that Shepton Mallet Prison has a future in its present role and are aware that the total population could be absorbed into vacancies at other category 'C' establishments in the area. If the prison is to continue it requires a clear function or set of functions which match the physical resources.

— HM Chief Inspector of Prisons, 1992

Shepton Mallet became the first category 'C' second-stage solely-lifer prison on 1 August 2001. It had an official capacity of 165, but in June 2010 was holding 188 prisoners, with arriving prisoners having to share cells for up to a year. It was divided into four wings:

- A wing – 37 spaces
- B wing – 94 spaces
- C wing – 43 spaces
- D wing – 15 spaces

An inspection report on the prison was issued following a full announced visit by inspectors from HM Chief Inspector of Prisons carried out in June 2010. The introduction to the report states:

This very positive report ... is testament to the benefits that can flow from having a small-scale niche prison with a settled population. Despite its ageing physical environment, the prison was a very safe place, with positive staff-prisoner relationships, a reasonable amount of activities, and a strong focus on addressing the serious risks posed by the population.

— HM Chief Inspector of Prisons, June 2010

The report commented in particular on the very good relations between prisoners and prison officers, and the low levels of self-harm, bullying, violence or drug use. Whilst the inspectors said that the accommodation was "old and tired", they felt that it was adequate for the current number of prisoners. The inspectors were concerned by proposals to increase the population by 70 prisoners.

=== Closure ===
On 10 January 2013, Justice Secretary Chris Grayling announced that Shepton Mallet Prison was one of seven prisons in England to close. HMP Shepton Mallet closed on 28 March 2013. The closure ceremony was attended by officers and staff, past and present, the Bishop of Bath and Wells, veterans and serving personnel of MTC Colchester, representatives of the US Armed Forces and family and friends. The final act was the handover of the union flag to the last governor. The event was also marked by a flypast of a Royal Naval Lynx helicopter from RNAS Yeovilton and an hour and a half peal from the local church bells. The staff, who marched to parade just inside the main gates, accompanied by the RNAS Yeovilton Volunteer Band, were then dismissed.

== Sale and tourist attraction ==
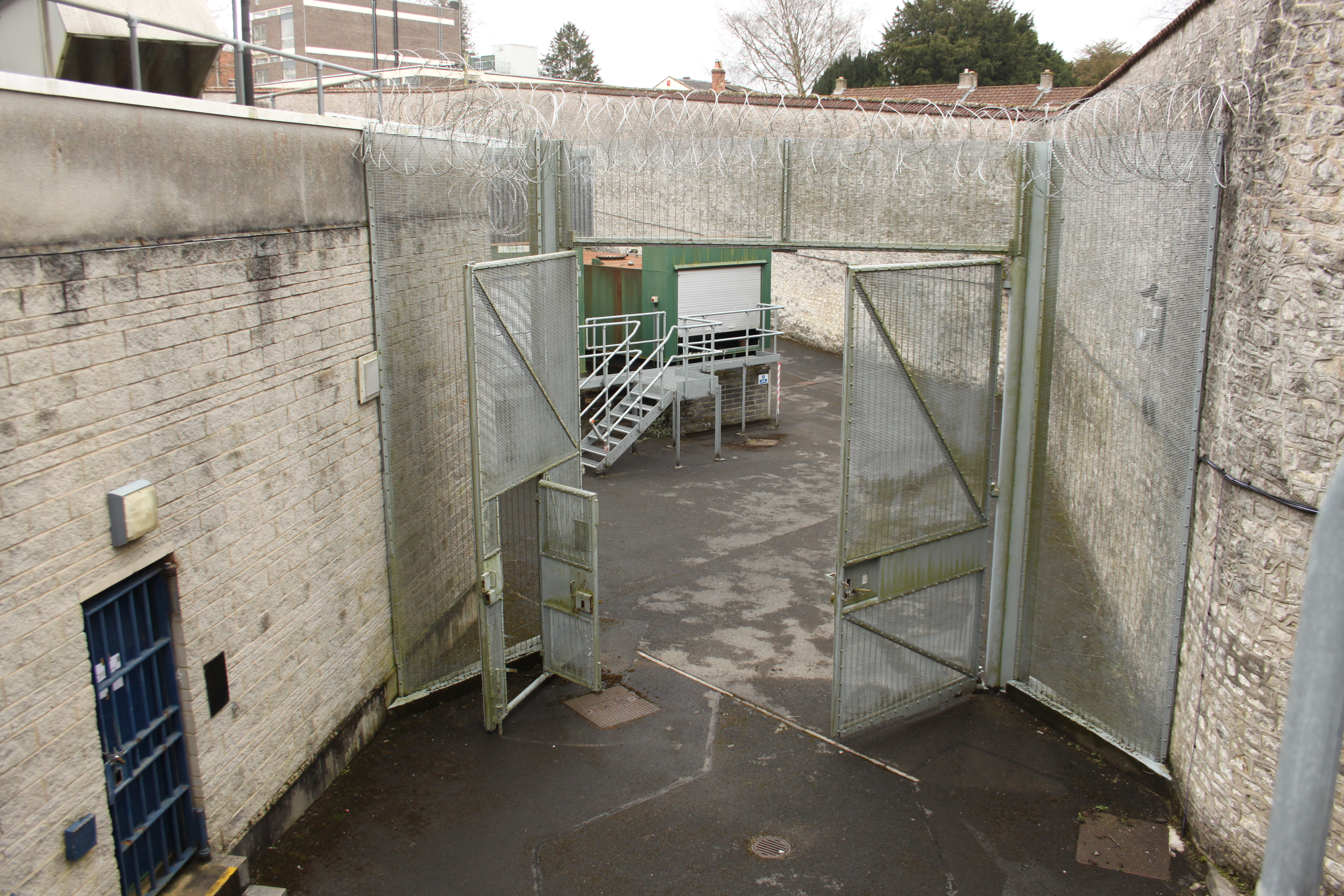
Secure entrance gates

After closure, the prison was put up for sale by the Ministry of Justice. The original deadline to declare a preferred bidder for the site was the end of March 2014, but this was put back until mid-August. Proposals for the site included converting it into prison heritage centre with hotel, bar and restaurants as well as housing, or converting the complex into a museum, gym, a hotel and ghost and horror tours. The proposals were rejected in October.

In December 2014, it was agreed Shepton Mallet Prison – along with Dorchester Prison, Gloucester Prison and Kingston Prison – would be sold to City and Country. It is now open to the public as a historical tourism destination, offering guided tours, ghost tours and a variety of other activities. In 2021, plans were approved to turn part of the prison into accommodation.

== Safety concerns and near closure as a tourist attraction ==
On 28 November 2023, it was announced on the prison's social media channels that the prison would close its doors as a tourist attraction on 2 January 2024 following a breakdown in relationship between the owners, City & Country, and the prison's operators, Cove Group, who also operate Shrewsbury Prison in Shropshire.

The dispute centred on the failure by the Cove Group to have up to date electrical safety testing done.

On 21 December 2023, Cove Group announced that the closure had been cancelled after last-minute negotiations with City & Country, that the prison would continue to be open to the public through the New Year, and that further negotiations were planned to take place on the New Year.

As of January 2024, Shepton Mallet Prison continues to be open to the public, and is offering annual visit passes, implying that the prison will continue to be open in the foreseeable future.

On 11 June 2025, three ex-employees of Cove Attractions Limited, who represented over a dozen former colleagues from Cove’s Shrewsbury and Shepton Mallet sites, appeared on a podcast hosted by ex-BBC Radio Shropshire presenter Jim Hawkins. In the podcast they described a “toxic work culture” under Cove Attractions Limited across both sites and concerns relating to health and safety, fire safety, building maintenance and Safeguarding. The podcast included an interview with Cove Group’s CEO Joel Campbell for his response.

In February 2026, another prison run by Cove Attractions Ltd - HM Peterhead Prison, faced imminent closure according to a press release from Cove due to funding difficulties caused by delays in the due diligence process as part of Cove’s attempt to buy Peterhead Prison. This led to speculation about the future of Shepton Mallet Prison under The Cove Group.

== Former inmates ==
- Ben Gunn, blogger and prison reform campaigner
- The Kray Twins, London gangsters, held in Shepton Mallet in the early 1950s after deserting the British Army.

=== Escapes and attempted escapes ===
Escapes, successful and attempted, from Shepton Mallet Prison include:

- November 1765 – prisoner Jeffreys, imprisoned for sheep-stealing. Recaptured after 12 days at Lyme Regis.
- 5 July 1776 – Mary Harris, aged about 30, broke out. She was still free on 6 March 1777 by which time the reward for her capture had risen to 20 guineas.
- 2 October 1819 – James Thompson escaped. He was caught in Bath on 23 March 1820.
- December 1835 – four prisoners, John Fowler, William Sage, Henry Mitchell and Thomas Ryan attempted to escape from the prison chapel, but were prevented from doing so.
- c. 1860 – prisoner Judge escaped through the 2-foot-wide (0.61 m) tunnel which carried the prison treadwheel shaft to the mill on the outside of the prison wall. He was later captured at Shaftesbury.
- 23 February 1866 – Daniel James escaped through the roof and over the wall. He was recaptured by midday near Upton Noble.
- 12 January 1878 – Samuel Glover Fudge, age 27, escaped. He was recaptured and, at the assize held in Taunton on 28 March 1878, was sentenced to an additional three weeks of hard labour.
- during the prison's Second World War use as a British military prison:
  - Brian Houghton escaped and remained free until voluntarily surrendering himself; he was court-martialled for his escape.
  - prisoner Maddison escaped.
  - prisoner Gutheridge escaped but was recaptured in Shepton Mallet.
  - prisoner George M, a professional safe-cracker, was found to be missing at morning roll call.
- July 1945 – during the prison's use as an American military prison, seven American soldiers stacked railway sleepers against a wall to escape, possibly with assistance from outside. Three remained at large for almost two months.
- 17 August 1966 – a convict, in prison for larceny and burglary, escaped whilst engaged in repairing prison staff accommodation. He was found later the same day having a drink in the King William Inn in the town.
- 30 July 1968 – two prisoners in an outside working party, again repairing staff accommodation, made off.
- May 1970 – once again a prisoner in an outside working party escaped his escorts. He was apprehended in the town centre a little over two hours later.
- 1976 – three inmates escaped through the barred toilet window of their dormitory, made it to the roof and then escaped over a lower roof.
- Summer 1977 – three men made their escape through the window of the plastics moulding workshop. A fourth attempted to escape but was prevented. One of the successful escapees was caught fairly quickly. The second was finally apprehended in Bridgwater after hijacking a police car and forcing the officer, at knife-point, to drive him away. The third remained at large until his arrest three months later for burglary.
- 1981 – the lock on a cell door was found to have been sawn off but no one escaped from the prison.
- 24 July 1981 – two prisoners escaped from an outside working party. They were found in Bristol six hours later that same day.
- February 1985 – a prisoner who set fire to his bedding in the hospital wing and pretended to be unconscious was taken to the Royal United Hospital, Bath. When there he changed his mind and decided not to escape. In court he pleaded guilty to a charge of criminal damage.
- 7 May 1985 – a prisoner left an outside working party but was recaptured five hours later 2 miles (3.2 km) north of the town.
- July 1985 – another prisoner absconded from work at the Town Council offices and stole some items from the parish church. He was found later in the day and, following trial, sentenced to an additional two months.
- 29 January 1987 – an inmate clearing snow in Collett Park made off, but was later arrested.
- 28 February 1987 – a prisoner stole and made off in a prison officer's car.
- 7 May 1987 – three men sawed through their cell window's bars, climbed onto the roof and escaped over the wall using a rope of knotted sheets.
- November 1990 – three prisoners broke through the ceiling of their cell, accessed the roof and descended the wall using knotted sheets.
- later in November 1990 – another prisoner escaped.
- 25 February 1991 – two prisoners managed to squeeze through a narrow hole in the ventilation shaft of the prison's plastics workshop. They were apprehended within a few hours, having been seen by a member of the public hiding from police.
- March 1991 – not technically an escape from the prison, but a Shepton Mallet prisoner who had tricked officers into taking him to the Royal United Hospital, Bath, by telling them that he had swallowed razor blades and glass escaped from his escorts through a toilet window. He was arrested in Cardiff four days later.
- June 1991 – a prisoner on an organised trip into Shepton Mallet to buy food for the prison kitchen made off.
- June 1991 – another inmate, part of a party making repairs to the prison wall, escaped.
- July 1991 – a prisoner in an outside working party escaped after asking to use the toilet.

== In the media ==
HM Prison Shepton Mallet was featured as a haunted location on the American paranormal television series Paranormal Lockdown which first aired on 25 December 2018 on Destination America. It later aired in the United Kingdom on 30 January 2020 on Quest Red.

The interior scenes at the fictional Portobello Prison in Paddington 2 were filmed at Shepton Mallet.

In September 2020, Shepton Mallet Prison featured in the ITV three-part mini drama, Des, based on the 1983 arrest and trial of Scottish serial killer Dennis Nilsen, starring David Tennant and Daniel Mays.

The prison featured extensively in series 6 of the ITV crime/mystery drama Grantchester.

It was also used as a filming location for the 2025 British prison film Wasteman.
