= HM Prison Swansea =

Prison in Swansea, Wales

HMP Swansea
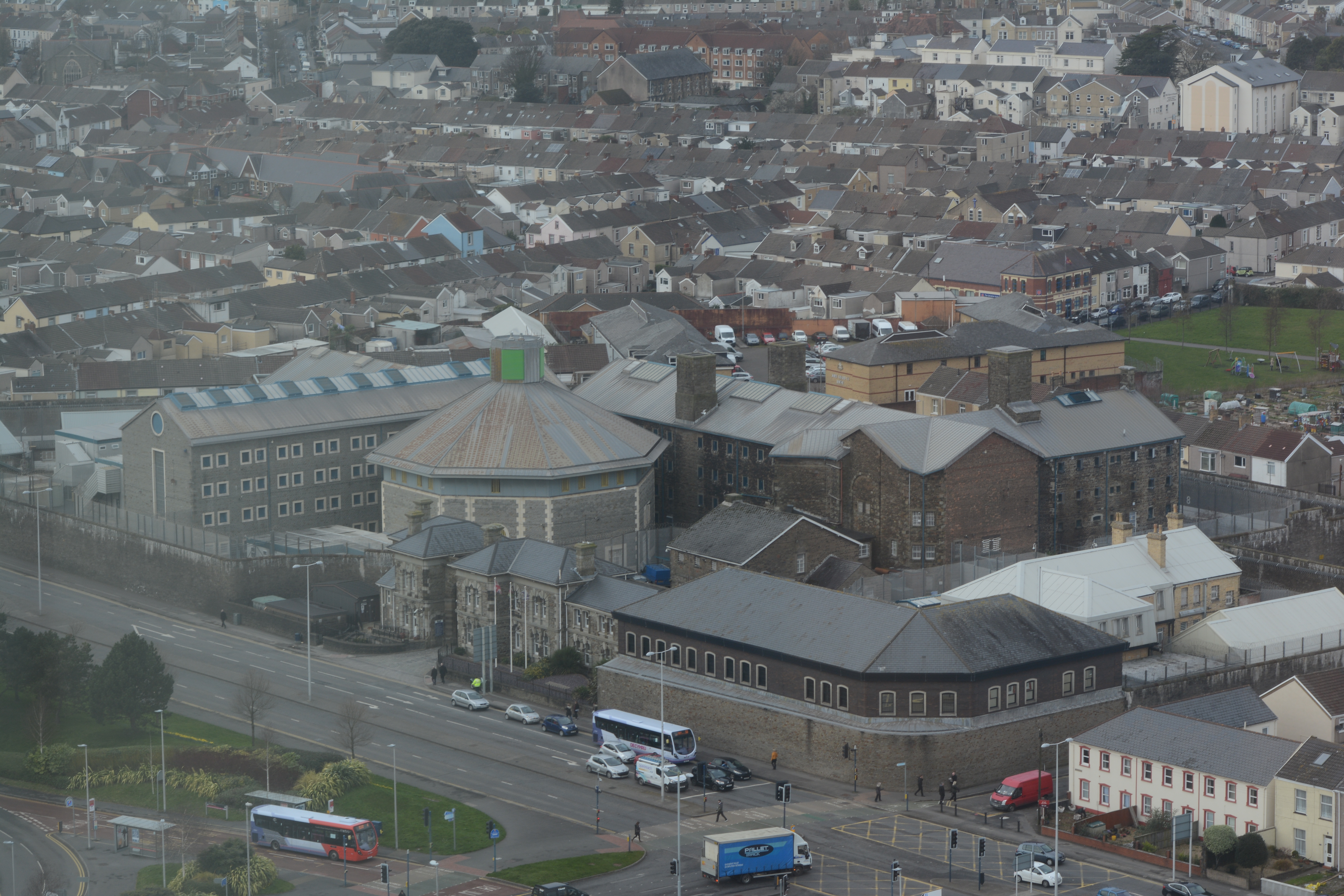
- Interactive map of HMP Swansea
- Location: Oystermouth Road, Sandfields, Swansea; 51.615°N 3.949°W
- Security class: Adult Male/Category B&C
- Population: 480 (November 2016)
- Opened: 1861
- Managed by: HM Prison Services
- Governor: Chris Simpson
- Website: Swansea at justice.gov.uk

HM Prison Swansea (Welsh: Carchar Abertawe EF) is a Category B/C men's prison, located in the Sandfields area of Swansea, Wales. The prison is operated by His Majesty's Prison Service.

== History ==
Swansea is a Victorian prison built between 1845 and 1861 to replace former prison accommodation at Swansea Castle. Both male and female inmates were incarcerated there until 1922, at which point all females were transferred to Cardiff Prison.

=== Execution site ===
A total of 15 judicial executions took place at Swansea prison between 1858 and 1958. All of the condemned prisoners were hanged for the crime of murder. Their names, ages and dates of execution are:

- Panotis Alepis, 23 yrs & Manoeli Selapatana, 28 yrs, 20 March 1858 (executioner: William Calcraft) First public hanging, at the front of the prison
- Robert Coe, 12 April 1866 (executioner: William Calcraft) Final public hanging at the prison
- Thomas Nash, 1 March 1886 (executioner: James Berry) First private hanging, out of public view inside the prison walls
- Thomas Allen, 10 April 1889 (executioner: James Berry, and an assistant)
- Joseph Lewis, 30 August 1898 (executioner: James Billington, assisted by his son Thomas)
- William Joseph Foy, 25 yrs, 8 May 1909 (executioner: Henry Pierrepoint, assisted by John Ellis)
- Henry Phillips, 44 yrs, 14 December 1911 (executioner: John Ellis, and an assistant)
- Daniel Sullivan, 38 yrs, 6 September 1916 (executioner: John Ellis, assisted by George Brown)
- Trevor Edwards, 21 yrs, 11 December 1928 (executioner: Robert Baxter, assisted by Alfred Allen)
- Rex Harvey Jones, 21 yrs, 4 August 1949 (executioner: Albert Pierrepoint, and an assistant)
- Robert Mackintosh, 21 yrs, 4 August 1949 (executioner: Albert Pierrepoint, and an assistant)
- Albert Jenkins, 38 yrs, 19 April 1950 (executioner: Albert Pierrepoint, and an assistant)
- Thomas Harries, 25 yrs, 28 April 1954 (executioner: Albert Pierrepoint, assisted by Robert Stewart)
- Vivian Teed, 24 yrs, 6 May 1958 (executioner: Robert Stewart, assisted by Harry Robinson)

Note: The execution of Jones & Mackintosh in 1949 was notable for being a double hanging i.e. both condemned men were executed simultaneously, whilst standing together on the same gallows. Jones & Mackintosh had committed unrelated murders. Double executions were already rare in the UK and the practice ended in 1952.

The remains of all executed prisoners were buried in unmarked graves within the prison walls, as was customary.

=== Recent history ===
In April 2002, an inspection report from His Majesty's Chief Inspector of Prisons condemned conditions for inmates at Swansea Prison. The report called on the prison to improve cleanliness and sanitation, particularly for vulnerable inmates who are housed away from other prisoners. The report also highlighted the lack of showers in all areas, which meant that not all inmates were able to shower every day. However the prison was praised for its rehabilitation of inmates.

Four months later, a survey of prison numbers revealed that HMP Swansea was Wales's most overcrowded prison, and one of the top five most densely populated in Britain. Statistics showed that Swansea was holding 145 more inmates than the 219 it should have been accommodating. Overcrowding has been an issue at the prison ever since.

== The prison today ==
Swansea is a Category B/C prison for adult males remanded into custody from the local courts, as well as convicted and sentenced prisoners.

Prisoners are employed in the prison's workshops, kitchen and recycling units. Full and part-time education is also provided. Other features include a Prisoner And Liaison Support Scheme, a Swansea City A.F.C. Social inclusion officer scheme, Prisoner elected councils, Job Centre Plus, Housing Officers and Community Chaplaincy.

In the early 1980s, Swansea started the Samaritans trained 'Prisoner Listener Scheme', that has now been developed in most prisons in the UK.

There are issues with suicide, self harm and violence among prisoners at Swansea Prison. The prison did not do enough to prevent eight prisoners killing themselves. Four of the suicides happened before an inspection in 2014 but a more recent visit showed the prison had not learnt lessons. Peter Clarke said, "Between our last inspection in 2014 and when we went back in the middle of last year there have been four further self-inflicted deaths – all in similar circumstances, all in the early days of the individual's imprisonment at Swansea jail. Quite simply, not enough has been done to understand the sort of problems they may have been facing and to prevent them inflicting harm and death upon themselves." The prison has been described as not fit for the purpose. On 14 January 2018 another inmate Robert Lee Evans, was found hanging in his cell, just days after the publication of a damning inspectorate report. An inquest into the death was opened on 23 January and the ombudsman is conducting an independent investigation.
