= HM Prison Leicester =

Local men's prison located in Leicester

Coordinates: 52°37′38.72″N 1°7′54.92″W

HMP Leicester
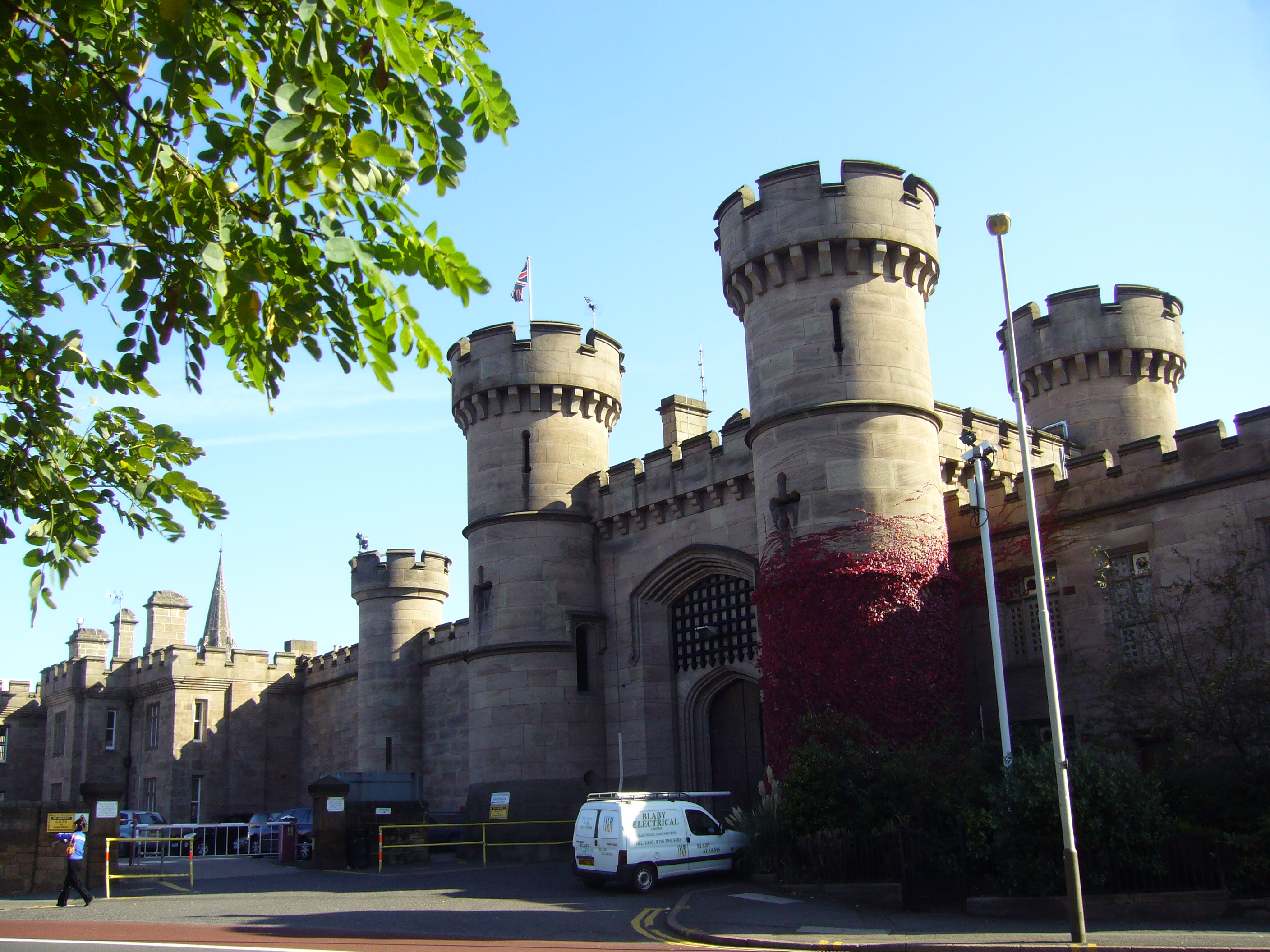
- HM Prison Leicester in 2008
- Interactive map of HMP Leicester
- Location: Leicester, Leicestershire
- Security class: cat B
- Population: 318 (Feb 2026)
- Opened: 1828
- Managed by: HM Prison Services
- Governor: Mat Davies
- Website: Leicester at justice.gov.uk

HM Prison Leicester is a Category B men's Local prison, located on Welford Road in the centre of Leicester, Leicestershire, England. The term 'local' means that the prison holds people on remand to the local courts, as well as sentenced prisoners. Leicester Prison is operated by His Majesty's Prison Service, and is situated immediately north of Nelson Mandela Park (formerly Welford Road Recreation Ground).

According to Colin Crosby, a Blue Badge guide based in Leicester, tourists invariably ask if the prison is 'Leicester Castle', due to the embattled, medieval design of its frontage, and its unique appearance has also made it one of the city's most celebrated landmarks. Known throughout the nineteenth century as the 'County Gaol', today the prison has become synonymous with the thoroughfare on which it stands, and is commonly referred to as 'Welford Road Prison', or simply, 'Welford Road'.

== History ==
The prison was designed by Leicester county surveyor William Parsons to resemble a castle and cost £20,000. The oldest part dates from 1825, and it was opened in 1828. The gatehouse including the adjoining building to north and south and the perimeter wall are grade II listed.

The journalist William Cobbett, who wrote about his journeys around England in the early 19th century, criticised the people of Leicester for being proud of their new prison, feeling that it would be more praiseworthy to have an absence of crime.

The prison's distinctive, red brick perimeter walls are thought to be the highest in the country, with an estimated height of 30 feet.

The only known escape by a prisoner through scaling the wall was an ill-fated one, made by renowned 'safe-blower', Albert Hattersley on the evening of 18 December 1953. Hattersley made his way through a skylight in the prison's workshop and used webbing and a long pipe which he had broken from a wall in the workshop toilets to help him scale the wall. He then chose to drop by his fingertips from a part of the wall which was located above the governor's garden, in the hope that the soft earth would help break his fall. However, Hattersley suffered a broken ankle, with his right tibia protruding the skin. After several hours on the run, he was re-captured the following day.

In 2014, it was reported that prison officers had thwarted a similar plan for an escape over the wall by an inmate who was serving six years for robbery. In describing what was envisaged by the inmate as a "Shawshank Redemption-style prison break", the Leicester Mercury reported that following a search of his cell, prison guards had discovered torn bed sheets tied together "to form ropes", along with mattress covers adjusted for use in negotiating barbed wire. It was reported that they also discovered a "boarded-up section" in the cell, with a panel that could be removed to access a hole the prisoner had been digging.

== Building ==
The gatehouse, adjoining buildings and perimeter wall are Grade II listed. It was built between 1825 and 1828 by William Parsons, the county surveyor, and received additions between 1844 and 1846 by M.J. Dain.

== Executions at Leicester Prison ==
There have been 23 executions carried out at Leicester Prison, between the years 1829 and 1953. The youngest person executed was John Swift, aged 19 in 1877, and the oldest was Thomas Bloxham, aged 62, in 1887. With the exception of the first four executions (carried out for offences of horse theft and highway robbery), all executions were carried out for offences of murder. All of those executed were male, with the exception of Sarah Smith in 1832 and there have been two triple executions, in 1829 and 1877, and two double executions, in 1903 and 1944.

=== 19th-century public executions ===
Executions at Leicester Prison were originally carried out publicly, typically attracting many thousands of spectators.

On 20 April 1829, a triple execution was carried out in front of the newly opened prison when Charles Forrester (21), John Hinton (25) and William Varnam (24) were hanged for horse stealing. In reporting the incident, the Leicester Chronicle newspaper noted that after the executioner had pulled caps over the faces of the condemned men, "a short but painful suspense took place, owing to some difficulty in removing the bolt which causes the platform on which they stood, to fall". It was also noted that about half of the huge crowd that had assembled to watch the event were women and children.

On 7 April 1830, John Watkins (28) was hanged for highway robbery.

On 26 March 1832, a particularly large crowd attended the hanging of Sarah Smith, a 28-year-old woman from Mountsorrel. She had killed Elizabeth Wood, a woman in her care, by adding arsenic to her tea. This was the only execution of a female to be carried out at Leicester Prison.

Also in 1832, a prisoner hanged at Leicester became one of the last two men in England to be gibbeted. James Cook (21) was a bookbinder, convicted of the murder of his creditor Paas, a manufacturer of brass instruments, in Leicester. He was executed on Friday 10 August 1832 in front of the prison. Following his execution it was noted: "The head was shaved and tarred, to preserve it from the action of the weather; and the cap in which he had suffered was drawn over his face. On Saturday afternoon his body, attired as at the time of his execution, having been firmly fixed in the irons necessary to keep the limbs together, was carried to the place of its intended suspension."

His body was displayed on a purpose-built gallows, 33 ft high in Saffron Lane near the Aylestone Tollgate and, according to The Newgate Calendar, "thousands of persons were attracted to the spot, to view this novel but most barbarous exhibition; and considerable annoyance was felt by persons resident in the neighbourhood of the dreadful scene. Representations were in consequence made to the authorities, and on the following Tuesday morning instructions were received from the Home Office directing the removal of the gibbet."

Gibbeting was soon after abolished in England, in 1834

William Hubbard (23) was hanged on 1 April 1846, for the murder of his wife at Leicester, having cut her throat with a butcher's knife.

John Fowkes (45) was hanged on 19 March 1856 for the murder of his 20 year old nephew, John Acres Fowkes, at Snarestone.

The last public execution at Leicester Prison took place on 25 July 1856, when an estimated crowd of 25,000 gathered to watch the hanging of William ("Peppermint Billy") Brown, aged 33, for the murder of Edward Woodcock, a 78-year-old tollgate keeper of Thorpe Arnold and his ten-year-old grandson James.

Following the Capital Punishment Amendment Act 1868 public executions were abolished and all hangings thereafter were carried out inside the prison, behind closed doors.

=== 19th-century private executions ===
For a short period between 1876 and 1877, executions at Leicester appear to have been carried out at the Borough Gaol on Highcross, where two hangings are recorded as having been carried out - those of John Thomas Green (41) on 20 December 1876 and John Henry Starkey (28) on 31 July 1877. Both men were hanged for the murder of their wives.

Hanging was resumed at the County Gaol on Welford Road on 27 November 1877, when the last triple execution to be carried out at the prison took place. James Satchwell (28), John Swift (19) and John Upton (32) were executed for the murder of Joseph Tugby, a 65 year old pedlar. Tugby had been drinking with the three men at the Stamford and Warrington public house in Coalville before they had followed him and kicked him to death at a nearby railway bridge. The scaffold upon which Satchwell, Swift and Upton were hanged was specially strengthened for the job by the executioner, William Marwood.

On 16 August 1886, James Banton (27) was hanged for the murder of PC Thomas Barratt at Breedon-on-the-Hill by the executioner William Berry.

On 11 February 1887, Thomas Bloxham (62), was hanged for the murder of his 48 year old wife, Ann, at their home in Fairfax Street, Leicester. Bloxham, who believed his wife had been unfaithful, first attempted to shoot her with a revolver but missed, after which he cut her throat, almost severing the head. Bloxham then tried to commit suicide by turning the revolver on himself, but the gun misfired, at which point he gave up and called the police.

On 10 December 1894, John William Newell (42), was hanged for the murder of his wife at Loughborough. Newell had beat his wife to death with a coal hammer at their grocer's shop on Woodgate, believing that she had been sleeping with a lodger. After killing her, Newell went into the street and confessed of his deed to a patrolling policeman. His executioner was James Billington.

=== 20th-century executions ===
There were eight executions at Leicester Prison during the twentieth century, between 1903 and 1953.

At 8 am on 21 July 1903, a double hanging took place in the prison's "execution shed", when Thomas Porter (29) and Thomas Preston (24) were hanged for the murder of PC William Adiel Wilkinson of Sileby. Both men protested their innocence before the trapdoor fell, after which the gaol bell was tolled and a black flag was flown from the roof of the prison to signal to the public that justice had been served. The executioner on this occasion was William Billington.

William Henry Palmer (50), a painter from Manchester, was hanged on 19 July 1911 for the murder of 72 year old Ann Harris at Walcote, near Lutterworth. The executioner was John Ellis.

Arnold Warren (32) was hanged on 12 November 1914 for the murder of his young son, James Warren.

Thomas William Thorpe (61) was hanged 23 December 1941 for the murder of his wife, Nellie. This was the first execution at the prison for 27 years.

A further double hanging was carried out at the prison on 8 August 1944. William Alfred Cowle (31) was hanged for the murder of Norah Payne in the city's Springfield Road, alongside William Frederick George Meffen (52), who had been sentenced to death for the murder of his stepdaughter in Derby. Their execution was performed by Thomas Pierrepoint, assisted by his nephew Albert.

The last execution was that of Joseph Christopher Reynolds (31), convicted at Leicester Assizes for the murder of Janet Warner, and hanged by Albert Pierrepoint on November 17, 1953.

== Campaign for reform ==
In 2000, The Guardian newspaper highlighted calls for the prison's reform following the tragic discovery of two prisoners found hanging in the same cell. The newspaper reported that seven years earlier in 1993, Inquest, a charity which campaigns for the families of people who die in custody, had described HMP Leicester as the "suicide capital of the prison system".

In 2001 Leicester again hit headlines as a 'failing prison' and David Ramsbotham, HM Chief Inspector of Prisons, declared that it should be shut down.

In 2004 the Prison Reform Trust described Leicester as one of the most overcrowded prisons in the country, and suggested that its true design capacity was around 200.

In November 2006 an inspection report from the Chief Inspector of Prisons criticised Leicester Prison after nine inmates died there in a 28-month period. Continued overcrowding and poor health at the prison were also highlighted.

== The prison in 2023 ==
According to a 2023 inspection report by HM Inspectorate of Prisons:

HMP Leicester is a small reception prison, the main purpose of which is to serve the courts of Leicester and elsewhere in the East Midlands. Holding up to 348 adult men, almost all on a single wing, the prison experiences many of the operational pressures inherent in its function. For example, it receives almost 1,500 new prisoners directly from the community each year, some 40% of whom are held on remand or awaiting sentence, and the daily movement of prisoners in and out of the establishment is considerable. The prison also holds a significant number of prisoners who are foreign nationals.

The report concluded that:

Overall, this is an encouraging inspection that describes a prison doing its best in difficult circumstances. The senior team was small, and each had a significant remit, but they communicated well with staff and were often seen around the prison. We were impressed by their resilience and commitment as well as their grounded assessment of the prison’s strengths and weakness. They had, however, more to do to recruit and retain staff and maintain staff morale, despite the positive culture we observed.

== Notable former inmates ==
- Brian Keenan
- Mark Morrison
- Ricky Tomlinson
- Charles Bronson
- Kray Twins
- William Thomas Hughes
- Alice Hawkins
