= Thomas Henry Scott =

- Occupation: Executioner
- Years active: 1889–1901

Thomas Henry Scott was an English executioner from 1889 to 1901. He was from Huddersfield in Yorkshire. A ropemaker by trade, he acted as executioner on seventeen occasions. He was on the Home Office list of approved executioners from 1892 to 1895.

Scott was an assistant executioner for James Berry as early as 1889. Starting in January 1892, he worked as an assistant hangman to James Billington, who was the chief executioner of Great Britain and Ireland.

Scott was scheduled to assist Billington in a hanging on 17 December 1895 at Walton Prison. On the night before the execution, he reported to the prison at 9:00 and then picked up a prostitute. They had sex "for about an hour and a half." Later, Scott realised that he had been robbed and reported the incident to the police. His wallet and glasses were later recovered when the prostitute showed up at the police station. When the Home Office was informed of Scott's deeds, they immediately removed him from the Home Office list. Billington performed the execution alone.

No longer welcome in England, Scott moved to Ireland and was the chief executioner there until 1901. In January 1899, he carried out three executions in a five-day stretch; he was assisted by Bartholomew Binns each time.

Scott carried out just one hanging in all of 1900 and then two in January 1901. He lost his job in Ireland when the authorities learned about his activities in England. The last hanging he performed was that of John Toole, at Mountjoy Gaol, on 7 March 1901.

== See also ==
- List of executioners
