= Alfred Allen (executioner) =

- Born: c. 1888
- Died: c. 1938
- Occupation: Executioner
- Years active: 1928–1937

Alfred Allen (c. 1888 – c. 1938) was an English executioner from Wolverhampton. His career lasted from 1928 to 1937, during which he conducted three hangings as a chief executioner and assisted at fourteen others.

Allen participated in his first hanging on 11 December 1928, when he assisted Robert Baxter. It did not go well for Allen. He did not move clear of the trapdoor after securing the prisoner's legs and then fell into the pit when Baxter pulled the lever. Allen was not injured.

Over the next few years, Allen did not receive many jobs. When he did, it was as an assistant to Thomas Pierrepoint. His first action as chief executioner came on 23 November 1932. He was reunited with Baxter one more time, in 1934; although there was no incident such as the one that had occurred during their first partnership, Baxter did state later that he found Allen "an unpleasant person to share sleeping quarters with." Allen carried out his last hanging on 17 August 1937.

He was struck off the list of executioners when, after failing to rupture a prisoner's spinal cord in a 1936 execution, he again put on the noose in the wrong way at the next execution in 1937.

== See also ==
- List of executioners
