= John Billington (executioner) =

English executioner (1880-1905)

- Born: 1880
- Died: 27 October 1905 (aged 24–25); Coppull, Lancashire, England
- Occupation: Executioner
- Years active: 1901–1905
- Children: 1
- Parent(s): James Billington; Alice Billington
- Relatives: Billington family Thomas Billington (brother); William Billington (brother)

John Billington (1880 – 27 October 1905) was an English executioner. He was on the Home Office list from 1901 to 1905.

== Career ==
Billington came from a family of hangmen. His father, James, was an executioner from 1884 to 1901, and his two older brothers, Thomas and William were employed in the same occupation.

In early 1902, at the age of 21, John attended an execution training course at Newgate Prison. His brother William was England's primary executioner by this time, and the two became partners. They first worked on 18 March. John was the assistant for 10 of William's commissions in 1902. He helped perform the last execution at Newgate and the first one at HM Prison Pentonville.

Billington continued as an assistant through most of 1903. However, with his experience, he was soon promoted. On 2 December 1903, he carried out his commission as a chief executioner in Manchester, with John Ellis as his assistant. Twenty-nine executions took place in England and Ireland in 1903; the Billington brothers participated in 27 of them, including 15 as a two-man team.

John Billington worked both as his brother's assistant and as a chief executioner for the next two years. On three occasions, they carried out executions in different cities on the same day. The last of these was on 17 August 1904, when John executed John Kay at Armley Prison, and William hanged Samuel Holden at Winson Green Prison.

Besides Ellis, John Billington also frequently worked with Henry Pierrepoint. In his career, Billington carried out 26 hangings as an assistant and 16 as a chief executioner. He worked as a hairdresser when not performing executions.

In August 1905, Billington received a commission to hang Thomas Tattersall in Leeds. While preparing the scaffold, he fell through the open trapdoor and cracked his ribs. He died about two months later due to those injuries; the official cause of death was pleurisy. However, an official death certificate stated the cause of death to be nephritis (inflammation of the kidneys)

Billington was 25 years old at the time. He was survived by his wife and one child.

== See also ==
- List of executioners
