= James Billington =

James Billington may refer to:

- James Billington (executioner) (1847–1901), executioner for the British government
- James H. Billington (1929–2018), American academic and former Librarian of Congress
