= Robert Baxter (executioner) =

English executioner (1878–1961)

- Born: c. 1878; Hertfordshire
- Died: 1961; Hertford
- Occupation: Executioner
- Years active: 1915–1935
- Spouse: Lydia
- Children: 1

Robert Orridge Baxter (c. 1878 – 1961) was an English executioner from Hertfordshire. His career lasted from 1915 to 1935, during which he carried out 44 hangings and assisted at 53 others.

== Career ==
Baxter worked at his first hanging, as an assistant to Thomas Pierrepoint, on 15 July 1915. He assisted both Pierrepoint and John Ellis sporadically over the next few years. On 12 August 1924, he participated in his first job as chief executioner when he hanged Frenchman Jean-Pierre Vaquier. He would, for the next decade, be the second-most active executioner in England, behind only Pierrepoint. They each received jobs on a regional basis, and Baxter was responsible for nearly every execution carried out in London. He carried out 24 consecutive hangings at Pentonville Prison. He and Pierrepoint soon became rivals, and they then started writing to under-sheriffs to request specific jobs, even though that was not allowed. They were both eventually reprimanded for doing this.

Baxter was generally regarded as a good executioner. He was once described as a "very quiet and efficient man [who] goes about his work quickly and silently." However, he had one minor flaw. On 11 December 1928, he carried out the execution of murderer Trevor Edwards at Swansea Prison. Working at his customary quick pace, Baxter failed to notice that his new assistant, Alfred Allen, had not cleared the trapdoor after strapping the prisoner's legs. When Baxter pulled the lever, Allen fell into the pit along with Edwards. Baxter blamed Allen for the mishap, but in the ensuing investigation, it was discovered that Baxter was completely blind in his left eye. He was absolved of any blame, however, and kept his job.

Baxter's reactions became increasingly slower in the mid-1930s. He carried out his last hanging on 30 October 1935 before finally being removed from the official Home Office list. He died in 1961, at the age of 83.

== See also ==
- List of executioners
