= George Brown (executioner) =

- Occupation: Assistant hangman
- Years active: 1911–1919

George Brown was an English executioner from 1911 to 1919. He was from Ashton-under-Lyne, near Manchester.

Brown was an assistant hangman for nearly a decade. He was appointed in 1910, and his first execution was that of William Palmer on 18 July 1911, where he assisted John Ellis. Palmer put up a fight, and while trying to strap Palmer's arms, Brown was on the receiving end of several punches and kicks.

Brown's next hangings came in December, and he assisted both Ellis and Thomas Pierrepoint for the rest of the decade. All in all, he participated in 22 hangings. His last job was on 7 October 1919.
