= Thomas Billington (executioner) =

British hangman (1872–1902)

- Born: 1872; Bolton, England
- Died: 10 January 1902 (aged 29–30)
- Occupation: Assistant executioner
- Years active: 1897–1901
- Parent(s): James Billington; Alice Billington
- Relatives: Billington family William Billington (brother); John Billington (brother)

Thomas Billington (1872 – 10 January 1902) was an English executioner from 1897 to 1901 and was one of four family members who worked in the occupation.

== Biography ==
Billington was born in Bolton, Lancashire. He worked primarily as a barman, but his father, James Billington, was an executioner and gained his son a job as an assistant executioner in 1897. Thomas was on the Home Office list from 1897 to 1901. He usually worked as an assistant to his father or to his younger brother, William. His youngest brother, John, also became an executioner.

Billington assisted his father in seven hangings in 1898. However, in the summer of 1899, he disappeared. His wife had died around that time, and his father later wrote that he had joined the army. After 18 months, he returned home and assisted his father in an execution at Cork on 11 January 1901. He was an assistant to either his father or to his brother in seven hangings that year. He assisted his brother full-time after his father became ill. However, Thomas himself soon started suffering from colds. He assisted in his last execution on 24 December 1901.

In December 1901, James Billington died. Thomas died about a month later, of pneumonia. He was 29 years old.

== See also ==
- List of executioners
