= Frederick Seddon =

English murderer (1872–1912)

Frederick Henry Seddon
- Born: 21 January 1872; Liverpool, England
- Died: 18 April 1912 (aged 40); Pentonville Prison, London, England
- Occupation: Insurance company administrator
- Spouse: Margaret Ann Jones (m. 1893)
- Children: 5
- Status: Executed by hanging
- Conviction: Murder
- Penalty: Death

Details
- Victims: Eliza Mary Barrow

Frederick Henry Seddon (sometimes spelled Sedden) (21 January 1872 – 18 April 1912) was a British murderer hanged in 1912 for the arsenic poisoning murder of his lodger Eliza Mary Barrow.

== Background ==
Frederick Seddon was born in Liverpool to William Seddon and Mary Ann (née Kennen) on 21 January 1872. He married Margaret Ann (née Jones) on 31 December 1893, and had five children with her: William James Seddon (born 1894); Margaret Seddon (born 1896); Frederick Henry Seddon Jr (born 1897); Ada Seddon (born 1905), and Lilian Louisa Agnes Emma Seddon (born 1911). His father also lived with him. The names of William and Frederick Seddon appear in the visitors' book for the Metropolitan Police's 'Black Museum' on 1 December 1905; the museum was not open to the general public and the reason for their visit is unknown.

At one time Seddon had been a Freemason, being initiated into Liverpool's Stanley Lodge No. 1325 in 1901. He resigned a year later to move south. In 1905 he is named as a founding petitioner of Stephens Lodge No. 3089 at Bourne End, Buckinghamshire. He resigned from both lodges in 1906.

In 1909, Seddon bought a fourteen-room house at 63 Tollington Park, near London's Finsbury Park area and worked as a Superintendent of Collectors for a national insurance company.

Seddon had an obsession with making money. He ran a second-hand clothes business in his wife's name and also speculated in real estate. At some stage he had the idea of swindling somebody, so he and his wife advertised to let out the second floor of their London home. A near-neighbour, Eliza Mary Barrow, an eccentric 47-year-old spinster, responded to this advertisement and moved on 26 July 1910 with her ward, Ernest George Grant, an eight-year-old orphan whose parents had been friends with Barrow. Previously, she had shared lodgings with her cousin, Frank Vonderahe, but she apparently hoped the new arrangement with Seddon would be cheaper.

== Murder ==
Eliza Barrow

Being easily led, and as keen on making money as Seddon was himself, Barrow was quickly persuaded by Seddon to sign over to him a controlling interest in all her savings and annuities, including £1,500 of India Stock, in return for which he would take care of her for the rest of her life, giving her a small annuity and allowing her to live in his home rent free. In August 1911, the Seddons, Barrow, and her young ward went on holiday together to Southend. On their return, Seddon's daughter Maggie was sent to buy a threepenny packet of flypaper from the local chemist. Shortly after, Barrow began to suffer from agonising stomach pains. The local doctor was called, who prescribed bismuth and morphine. On 9 September he visited her again, but by the following Monday her condition had deteriorated. However, she refused to go to hospital.

She improved slightly for a few days, but was confined to her bed where, on 13 September, she made a will, dictated to and executed by Seddon, and witnessed by his relatives. At 6:15 on the morning of 14 September, while being looked after by Mrs. Seddon, Barrow died. Seddon went to the doctor, who issued a death certificate without seeing the body, claiming that he was unable to attend due to overwork brought on by an epidemic current in the area at that time.

On 15 September, Seddon went to the undertaker and arranged a cheap funeral, keeping the small commission for himself. Barrow's burial took place in a common burial plot, although her family had a vault in Highgate Cemetery West. Seddon's later explanation for this was that Barrow's family had snubbed his daughter during an earlier visit and he was not prepared to allow his family to be treated in the same way again, and that if Barrow's family missed the funeral it might teach them better manners for the future. Immediately after the funeral the Seddon family left for Southend for a fortnight's holiday. Barrow's cousin, Frank Vonderahe, suspicious over the suddenness of the death and how quickly the funeral arrangements had been made, arrived to take over possession of her estate. However, Seddon informed him that nothing was left as he had paid the substantial funeral expenses and the cost of Ernest Grant's upkeep himself. The Vonderahe family then went to the police and voiced their suspicions. Barrow's body was exhumed on 15 November 1911, and an examination of it by Sir William Willcox, the senior Home Office specialist, and young pathologist Bernard Spilsbury, who had already made a name for himself in the Crippen case, discovered about two grains of arsenic. As in the Crippen trial, Spilsbury showed himself to be an outstanding witness for the prosecution, easily dealing with cross-examination by the junior defence barrister and demonstrating highly effective forensic techniques.

== Trial and execution ==
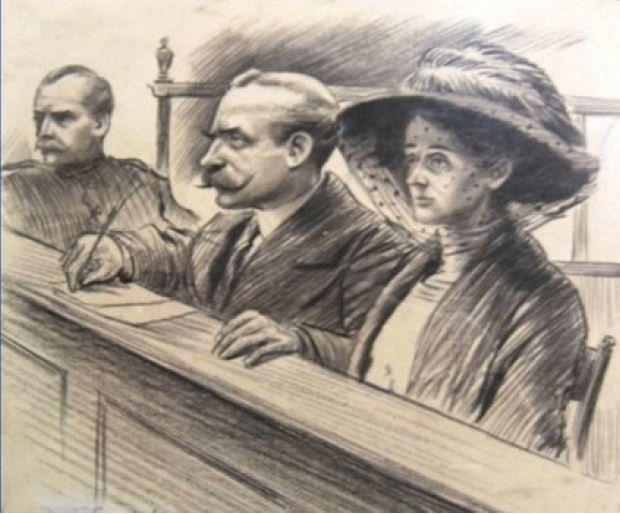
Sketch by William Hartley of Seddon and his wife in the dock at the Old Bailey (Crime Museum)

Seddon and his wife became the chief suspects in what was by now a murder inquiry. During their trial at the Old Bailey the prosecution, led by the Attorney General, Sir Rufus Isaacs KC, proved that Margaret Seddon had previously bought a large amount of flypaper, which contained arsenic. The prosecution suggested that the poison used to kill Barrow had been obtained by soaking the flypaper in water. The renowned barrister Edward Marshall Hall KC led for the defence. He strongly resisted all claims that Barrow had been poisoned, claiming instead that she had died by taking a medical preparation containing arsenic. Despite the advice given by his Counsel, Seddon insisted on giving evidence in his own defence; it was claimed that he turned the jury against himself through his arrogant and condescending attitude. Certainly, his case was not helped by his ridiculous claim that Barrow might have drunk water from the dishes of flypaper that had been placed in her room to keep away the flies. Despite a fierce battle from the defence team, the jury took just one hour to find him guilty. Margaret Seddon was acquitted of any involvement in the murder. Marshall Hall always maintained that Seddon would have been acquitted had he not insisted on giving evidence, and on at least one occasion used it as an example in warning a client of the risks of giving evidence in one's own defence.

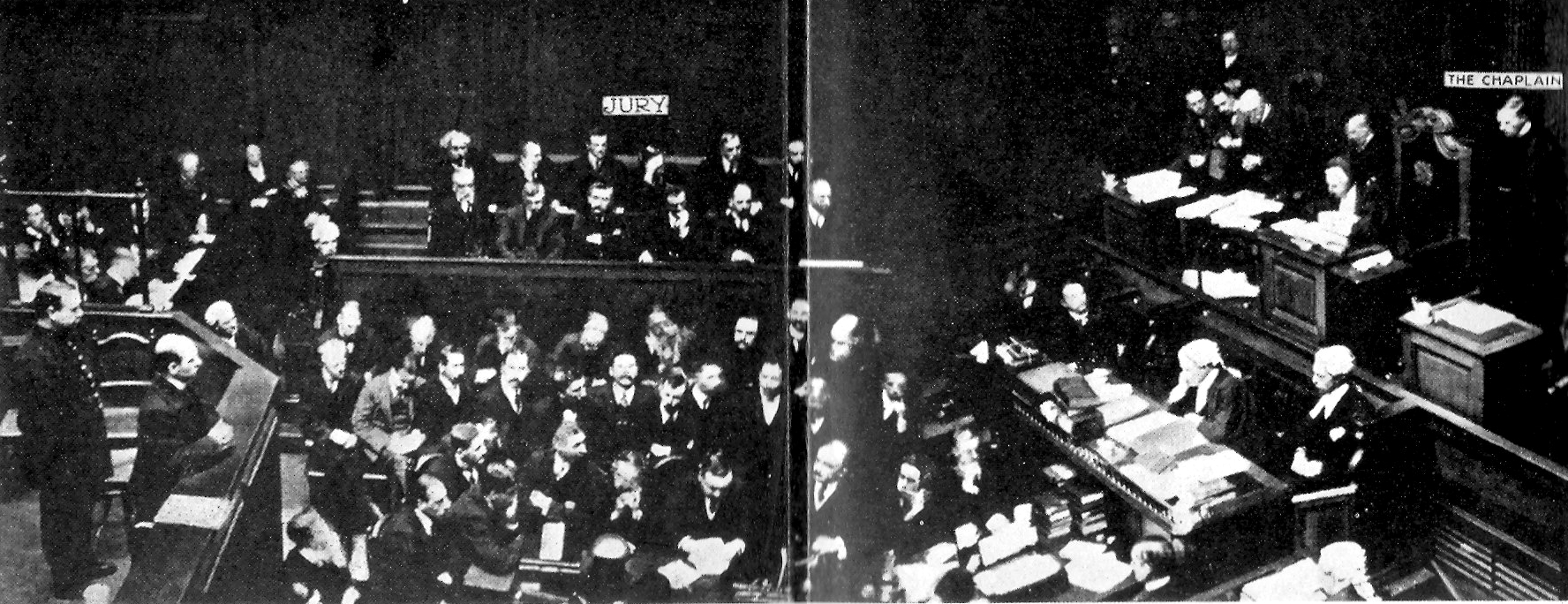
Seddon being sentenced to death by Mr Justice Bucknill

A former Freemason, on being asked by the Clerk of the Court if he had anything to say as to why the sentence of death should not be passed against him, Seddon replied at length and appealed directly to the judge, Sir Thomas Townsend Bucknill, as a brother Mason and in the name of 'The Great Architect Of The Universe' to overturn the jury's guilty verdict. According to some sources he gave the First Degree sign, according to others the Sign of Grief and Distress, begging for mercy. The judge is reported as having said, with some emotion:

It is not for me to harrow your feelings – try to make peace with your Maker. We both belong to the same Brotherhood, and though that can have no influence with me this is painful beyond words to have to say what I am saying, but our Brotherhood does not encourage crime, it condemns it.

Seddon replied that he had already made his peace with his Maker. Mr Justice Bucknill then pronounced the sentence of death, and an unknown photographer took one of the only two known photographs of the black cap being actually worn while a death sentence is being pronounced. Bernard Spilsbury, who went on to become a famous pathologist and who gave evidence during the trial, was not yet involved in Freemasonry, and so the meaning of what had passed between Seddon and Bucknill was lost on him at the time. However, his colleagues who also provided forensic evidence were Masons, and they were aware of its significance.

Seddon was hanged by John Ellis and Thomas Pierrepoint at Pentonville Prison on 18 April 1912. After his execution his widow, Margaret Ann Seddon, returned to Liverpool where she married James Donald Cameron on 4 November 1912, less than seven months after her husband's execution. Later she moved with Cameron to the United States, taking her five children with her.

== Portrayals ==
In the 1957 play A Dead Secret by Rodney Ackland, the character of Seddon under the name of Frederick Dyson, was played by Paul Scofield.

On 12 April 1959, the television series Alfred Hitchcock Presents aired an episode, "Waxwork", which depicted Seddon as one of six murderers in a wax museum's murderer's row.

In the 1981 Granada Television series Lady Killers, Seddon was played Michael Jayston in an episode entitled "Root of All Evil".

On 21 July 2007, BBC Radio 4 broadcast a play by John Fletcher based on the murder of Mrs Barrow, entitled The Shocking Tale of Margaret Seddon, which took the premise that Frederick's wife Margaret had planned and committed the crime.

The case was reevaluated using modern forensic techniques in an episode of the BBC series Murder, Mystery and My Family (2020) which reinvestigated the evidence against Seddon. Judge David Radford found Seddon's conviction to have been safe.
