= Thomas Tattersall =

English murderer (1874–1905)

- Born: Thomas George Tattersall; 12 July 1874; Wakefield, Yorkshire, England
- Died: 15 August 1905 (aged 31); Leeds, Yorkshire, England
- Cause of death: Execution by hanging
- Occupation: Plasterer
- Spouse: Rebecca Tattersall
- Children: Laura
- Conviction: Murder
- Penalty: Death

Thomas George Tattersall (12 July 1874 – 15 August 1905) was an English plasterer who was convicted of murdering his wife.

Tattersall, from Wakefield, was a notorious drunk. He would often threaten his wife, Rebecca, and the police had once put their house under surveillance because of this. On 3 July 1905, Tattersall cut Rebecca's throat with a razor and fractured her skull with an axe. He was discovered by the couple's daughter, Laura, who subsequently told their neighbours about what had happened.

The following day, Tattersall was arrested at a railway station. He pleaded insanity, but to no avail, and was sentenced to death by Mr Justice Jelf. He was hanged at Armley Prison in Leeds, on 15 August 1905.

His executioner, John Billington, died two months later due to a fall he had sustained while preparing for Tattersall's hanging.
