= Henry Pierrepoint =

British executioner (1877–1922)

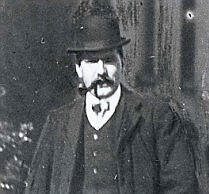
- Pierrepoint in 1909
- Born: Henry Albert Pierrepoint; 30 November 1877; Normanton on Soar, Nottinghamshire, England
- Died: 12 December 1922 (aged 45); Failsworth, England
- Occupation: Executioner
- Spouse: Mary Buxton (m. 1898)
- Children: Albert Pierrepoint
- Parent(s): Thomas and Ann Pierrepoint
- Relatives: Thomas Pierrepoint (brother)

Henry Albert Pierrepoint (30 November 1877 – 12 December 1922) was an English executioner from 1901 until 1910. He was the father of Albert Pierrepoint and brother of Thomas William Pierrepoint.

== Early life ==
Pierrepoint was born in Normanton on Soar, Nottinghamshire, the fourth child and second son of Thomas Pierrepoint, a railway platelayer, and Ann Pierrepoint, nee Marriott.

By 1891, he and his family had moved to Clayton, near Bradford, where he was employed in a worsted mill. Henry was unhappy working there, and so in 1893 his father arranged an apprenticeship for him at a large butchers in Bradford. Three years later he left the apprenticeship and moved to Manchester where his sister Mary was one of the managers at a cabinet making firm. Not long after this he met a local girl, Mary Buxton, and they were married at St Anne's Church in Newton Heath, Manchester on 26 December 1898.

== Career as a hangman ==
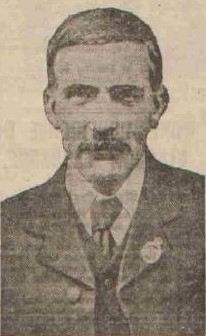
Pierrepoint in 1922.

In 1901, Henry was appointed to the list of executioners after repeatedly writing to the Home Office to offer his services. He participated in his first hanging on 19 November, as an assistant to James Billington.

Over the next few years, he worked primarily as an assistant to William and John Billington before becoming the principal executioner of Britain in 1905. In 1906, he carried out all eight hangings on the island.

Pierrepoint later persuaded his elder brother Thomas to join the family business, and reputedly trained him in a stable with a rope and sacks of corn. Later, an interview he gave, published in a local newspaper, inspired his son Albert to do the same. In his nine-year term of office Henry carried out 105 executions. His career was finished when he arrived the day before an execution at Chelmsford Prison "considerably the worse for drink", and fought his assistant John Ellis. Ellis reported the incident to the Home Office which decided, after receiving confirmation by the warders' account of the matter, to strike Henry from the list of approved executioners.

Henry was never officially "dismissed", but he was removed from the list of executioners and invitations to conduct executions ceased to arrive.

Throughout his career as an executioner, Pierrepoint occupied various other jobs, such as a position in Huddersfield gasworks, to supplement the relatively low pay English hangmen received.

Henry had been suffering from a terminal illness for several years and died at his home in Failsworth on 12 December 1922, aged 45, although his age was incorrectly registered as 48.

== Bibliography ==
- Fielding, Steve (2008). Pierrepoint: A Family of Executioners. London: John Blake Publishing Ltd. ISBN 978-1-84454-611-4.
- Fielding, Steve (2007). The Executioner's Bible: The Story of Every British Hangman of the Twentieth Century. London: John Blake Publishing Ltd. ISBN 978-1-84454-422-6.
