= Charles Thomas Wooldridge =

British trooper convicted of uxoricide

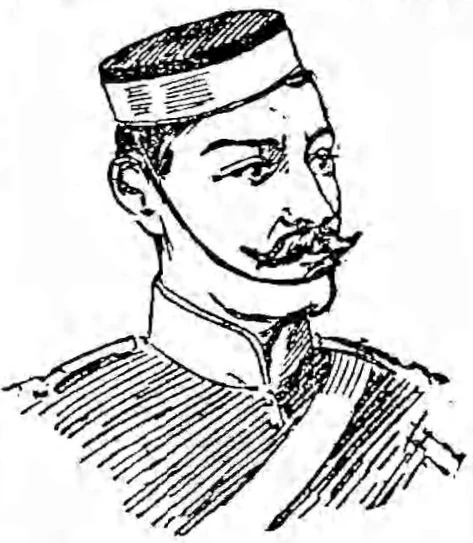
Wooldridge, in an 1896 illustration

Charles Thomas Wooldridge (1864 – 7 July 1896) was a Trooper in the Royal Horse Guards who was executed in Reading Gaol for uxoricide and who, as 'C.T.W', was the dedicatee of Oscar Wilde's poem The Ballad of Reading Gaol.

== Biography ==
The son of Eleanor (born c.1827) and Charles Wooldridge (born c.1824), Wooldridge was born in East Garston and joined the Royal Horse Guards in 1886. He married Laura Ellen "Nell" Glendell (1873–1896) in 1894 when his regiment was posted to Windsor. However, his commanding officer had not given permission for the wedding to take place. Wooldridge's wife was "off the strength" and so was unable to join her husband when his regiment moved from Windsor to Regent's Park Barracks in London, forcing the couple to live apart and putting a strain on the marriage.

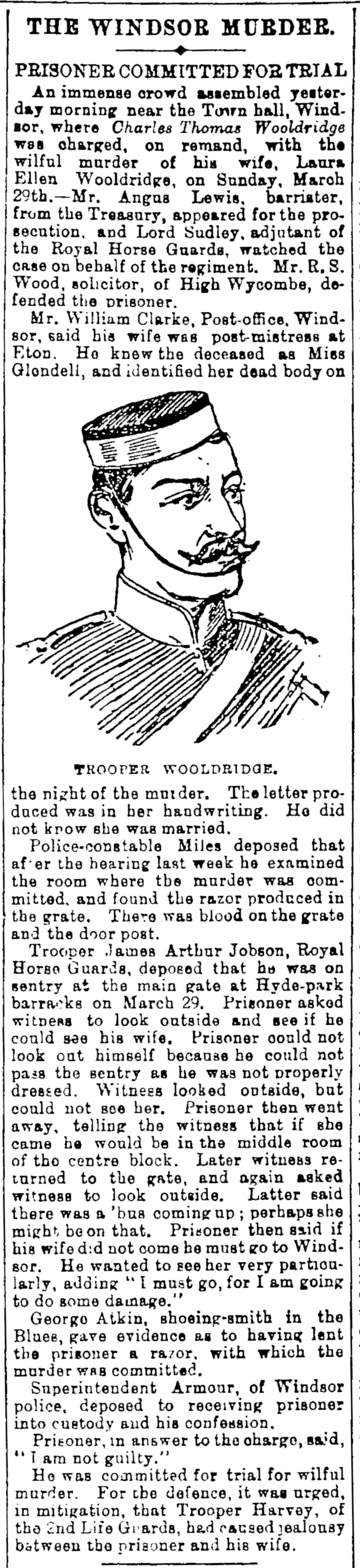
Contemporary coverage of his trial

At first the couple were devoted to each other, despite the enforced separation. "Nell" Wooldridge was of a lively and flirtatious nature, while Charles Wooldridge was of a jealous and suspicious disposition; consequently, they argued a great deal when they were together. By March 1896, she had started to use her maiden name again. When he visited her, Wooldridge attacked his wife and blackened her eyes and injured her nose. From then on, she avoided Wooldridge, refusing to see him. Having heard rumours that she was having an affair with either another soldier or an official at the General Post Office where she worked, and having received a document from her to sign stating that he would stay away from her, he arranged to meet Laura Ellen outside Regent's Park Barracks on 29 March 1896 but, when she failed to turn up, he travelled to her lodgings at Clewer, near Windsor. A violent argument ensued, which spilled out on to the street outside. He used a cut-throat razor he had taken with him to cut her throat before giving himself up to Police Constable Forster, who arrested him and took him to Windsor Police Station. Wooldridge told the police that he would have cut his own throat if he had not dropped the murder weapon.

At his subsequent trial, he was defended by H.S. Wood of High Wycombe but the jury took just two minutes to find him guilty despite Wood's attempts to get the charge reduced to manslaughter because of Nell's unfaithfulness. Wood set up a petition for a reprieve and, assisted by a Miss Eleanor Grave, succeeded in gaining a great number of signatures. However, the trial judge, Mr. Justice Hawkins, stated that Wooldridge's taking the cut-throat razor with him to Windsor was evidence of premeditation and so refused to consider a reprieve.

In Reading Gaol, Wooldridge told the prison chaplain that he was filled with grief and remorse at having killed his beloved wife. He resisted attempts at a reprieve (including a recommendation for clemency from the jury that convicted him) by petitioning the Home Secretary Sir Matthew White Ridley for the sentence to be allowed to be carried out.

On the morning of the execution, Wooldridge attended a service in the prison chapel, showed repentance for his terrible crime, and was resigned to his fate. Because of The Ballad of Reading Gaol, Wooldridge became the most famous person ever to be executed at Reading. The executioner was James Billington, whose use of a drop longer than specified by the Official Table of Drops stretched Wooldridge's neck by eleven inches. It was reported that he was aged 30 when executed.

== The Ballad of Reading Gaol ==
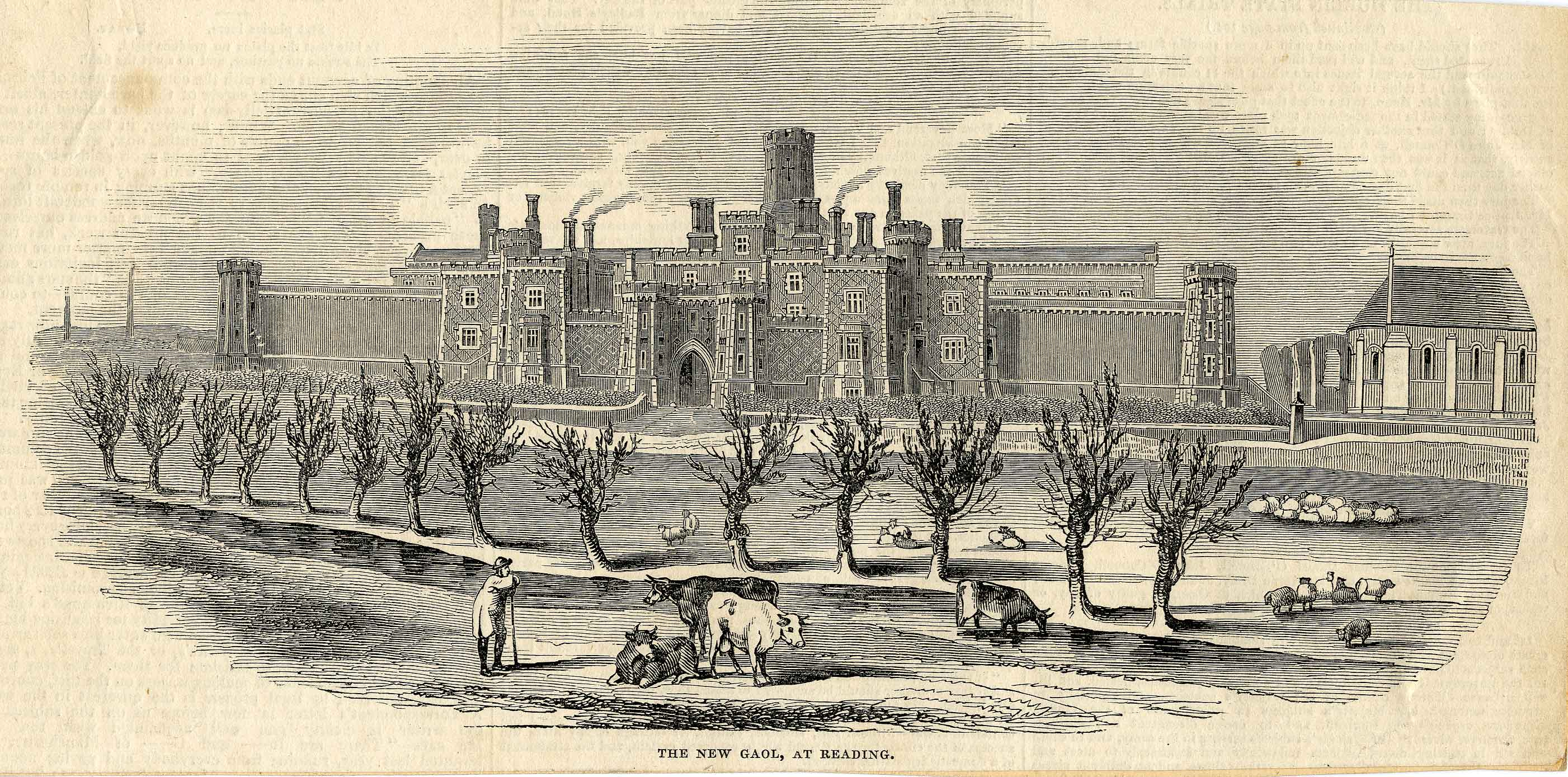
Reading Gaol in 1844

Wilde was imprisoned in Reading Gaol when Wooldridge was hanged there on Saturday 7 July 1896. The two never met but Wilde would observe the condemned man during silent exercise periods in the prison yard, known as the 'Fools' Parade'. The execution of Wooldridge (known as "C.T.W" in the poem) had a profound effect on Wilde, inspiring the line in the ballad "yet each man kills the thing he loves". Wilde was mistaken in his belief that Wooldridge killed his wife in her home; contemporary reports stated that the murder was committed in the street.
