= Thomas Neill Cream =

Scottish-Canadian serial murderer (1850–1892)

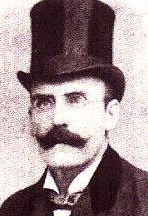
- Cream c. 1890
- Born: 27 May 1850; Glasgow, Scotland
- Died: 15 November 1892 (aged 42); Newgate Prison, England
- Spouse: Flora Brooks (m. 1876; died 1877)
- Status: Executed by hanging
- Convictions: Murder (Illinois); Murder (England)
- Penalty: Life imprisonment (Illinois); Death (England)

Details
- Victims: 5 known
- Span of crimes: 1881–1892
- Country: United States and England
- States: Illinois and Middlesex
- Date apprehended: 3 June 1892

Thomas Neill Cream (27 May 1850 – 15 November 1892), also known as the Lambeth Poisoner, was a Scottish-Canadian medical doctor and serial killer who poisoned his victims with strychnine. Cream murdered up to ten people in three countries, targeting mostly lower-class women, sex workers and pregnant women seeking abortions. He was convicted and sentenced to death, and was hanged on 15 November 1892.

A popular rumour, started by hangman James Billington, claims that Cream's last words were "I am Jack the...", seemingly a confession to being Jack the Ripper. However, Billington is the only source for this alleged statement, and official records show that Cream was incarcerated in Illinois during the Ripper murders.

== Early life ==
Thomas Neill Cream was born in Glasgow on 27 May 1850. Cream's family moved to Canada, then still a dominion of the British Empire, in 1854; he was raised outside Quebec City. Cream attended the now-defunct Lachute Academy before becoming a student at McGill University in Montreal, graduating with an MDCM degree in 1876.

In 1876, while living in Waterloo, Quebec, Cream met and courted a woman named Flora Brooks. When Brooks became pregnant a few months later after Cream had promised to marry her, he attempted to perform an abortion but failed. With Brooks left severely ill, Cream attempted to escape to Montreal but was caught by Brooks' father, who forced him to return and to marry her. The day after the wedding, Cream left for England to continue his medical education. The Brooks family never saw or heard from him again. Brooks herself almost fully recovered but died of consumption in 1877.

Cream, having gone to Great Britain, received his post-graduate training at St Thomas's Hospital Medical School in London, and in 1878 obtained additional qualifications as a physician and surgeon in Edinburgh. Cream then returned to North America seeking to practise in a community in need of physicians; after a brief experience in Des Moines, Iowa, he relocated to London, Ontario.

== Murders ==
=== London, Ontario ===
Cream returned to North America in 1878 and established a medical practice in London, Ontario. He was charged under Ontario's Medical Act with practising without a license and later pleaded guilty. However, this did not deter patients from visiting his office.

In 1879, Catharine Hutchinson Gardner was found dead in a privy behind Cream's office at 204 Dundas Street. She was pregnant and had been murdered with a handkerchief soaked in chloroform. Cream had refused to help her with an abortion, instead urging her to accuse a local businessman of being the father. Cream claimed Gardner had threatened to poison herself when he had not agreed to perform the abortion, and that she had written him a letter in which she named the businessman as the father. However, Gardner's family and roommate denied that she had written it, as the signature and handwriting on the letter did not match her own, and it was dismissed as forgery. Despite rumours and overwhelming evidence against Cream, authorities took no further action and the case was never solved.

Shortly after this incident, Cream relocated to Chicago.

=== Chicago ===
Cream established a medical practice not far from the red-light district in Chicago, offering illegal abortions to sex workers. He was investigated in August 1880, after the death of Mary Anne Faulkner, a woman on whom he had allegedly operated; he escaped prosecution due to lack of evidence. In December 1880, another patient, Miss Stack, died after treatment by Cream, and he subsequently attempted to blackmail the pharmacist who had filled the prescription.

In April 1881, a woman named Alice Montgomery died of strychnine poisoning following an abortion in a rooming house barely a block from Cream's office. The case was ruled a murder but never solved. The location, time period, and method make Cream a likely suspect.

On 14 July 1881, Daniel Stott died of strychnine poisoning at his home in Boone County, Illinois, after Cream supplied him with an alleged remedy for epilepsy. The death was attributed to natural causes, but Cream wrote to the coroner blaming the pharmacist for the death after he again attempted blackmail. This time, Cream was arrested, along with Julia A. (Abbey) Stott, who had allegedly become Cream's mistress and procured poison from Cream to kill her husband. She turned state's evidence to avoid jail, laying the blame on Cream, which left him to face a murder conviction on his own. He was sentenced to life imprisonment in Joliet Prison. Daniel Stott's friends erected a tombstone at his grave, which reads: "Daniel Stott Died June 12, 1881 Aged 61 Years, poisoned by his wife and Dr Cream."

After 10 years in prison, Cream was released in July 1891. Governor Joseph W. Fifer had commuted his sentence after Cream's brother pleaded for leniency and allegedly bribed the authorities.

=== London ===
Using money inherited from his father, who had died in 1887, Cream sailed for England, arriving in Liverpool on 1 October 1891 (three years after the Jack the Ripper killings had been committed). He went to London and took lodgings at 103 Lambeth Palace Road. At the time, Lambeth was riddled with poverty, petty crime, and sex work.

On 13 October 1891, Ellen "Nellie" Donworth, a 19-year-old sex worker, received two letters from Cream, and agreed to meet him. He offered her a drink from a bottle. She became severely ill that night and died from what was later found to be strychnine poisoning. During her inquest, Cream wrote to the coroner under the pseudonym A. O'Brien, Detective, offering to name the murderer in return for a £300,000 reward. He also wrote to W. F. D. Smith, owner of the W H Smith bookstalls, accusing him of the murder and demanding money for his silence.

On 20 October, Cream met a 27-year-old sex worker named Matilda Clover, and offered her pills, instructing her to take four before bed. She began experiencing violent, painful spasms later that night and died two hours later. Her death was assumed to be heart failure due to alcohol withdrawal. Cream, under the name M. Malone, wrote a letter to the prominent physician William Broadbent, claiming to have evidence of his involvement in Clover's death and demanding £25,000 for his silence. Broadbent contacted Scotland Yard, and they set a trap for the blackmailer when he would come to collect the money. However, no one was caught.

On 2 April 1892, after a vacation in Canada, Cream returned to London, where he met Louise Harvey (née Harris), a sex worker. He offered her two pills, insisting she swallow them right away. Harvey, suspicious of him, pretended to swallow the pills he had given her but palmed them and secretly threw them away.

On 11 April, Cream met two sex workers, Alice Marsh, 21, and Emma Shrivell, 18, and spent the night with them in their flat, then before leaving offered them three pills each and a can of tinned salmon. Both women died later that night from strychnine poisoning.

=== Capture ===
Through his blackmail letters, Cream succeeded in drawing close attention to himself. Not only did the police quickly determine the innocence of those accused, but they noticed something telling in the accusations made by the anonymous letter-writer: he had referred to the murder of Matilda Clover. Clover's death had been registered under natural causes, related to her drinking. The police quickly realised that the false accuser who had written the letter was the serial killer now referred to in the newspapers as the "Lambeth Poisoner".

Not long afterwards, Cream met a policeman from New York City who was visiting London. The policeman had heard of the Lambeth Poisoner, and Cream gave him a brief tour of where the various victims had lived. The American happened to mention it to a British policeman who found Cream's detailed knowledge of the case suspicious.

The police at Scotland Yard put Cream under surveillance and soon discovered his habit of visiting sex workers. They also conducted an investigation in the United States and Canada and learned about their suspect's history, including the conviction for a murder by poison in 1881.

On 3 June 1892, Cream was arrested for the murder of Matilda Clover, and on 13 July he was formally charged with the murders of Clover, Donworth, Marsh, and Shrivell, the attempted murder of Harvey, and extortion; his medicine/poisoning kit (taken in as evidence) is now in the Crime Museum. From the start, he insisted he was only "Dr Thomas Neill", not Thomas Neill Cream, and the newspapers usually referred to him as "Dr Neill" in their coverage of the proceedings.

At the inquest into Matilda Clover's death that was held by Athelstan Braxton Hicks in July 1892, he read out a letter signed by Jack the Ripper, declaring "Dr Neill" innocent, which produced laughter, including from "Neill". The jury returned the verdict that Matilda Clover died from strychnine poisoning administered by "Thomas Neill".

== Trial and execution ==
His trial lasted from 17 to 21 October 1892. After a deliberation lasting only 12 minutes, the jury found him guilty of all counts, and Justice Henry Hawkins sentenced him to death.

The day before his execution, he made a new will leaving his estate to his solicitors. This will revoked a previous will he had made on 7 January 1892, naming Miss Laura Sabatini of Berkhamsted, who he had become engaged to marry on 23 December 1891, as his executor and heir.

Less than a month after his conviction, on 15 November, Cream was hanged at Newgate Prison by James Billington. As was customary with all executed criminals, his body was buried on the same day beneath the flagstones of the prison – along with other executed criminals – marked by one initial. His body was disinterred in 1902 and moved to City of London Cemetery. He is now buried in an unmarked grave in section 339.

=== "I am Jack the..." ===
Billington claimed that Cream's last words on the scaffold were "I am Jack the..." Billington promoted this alleged incident as proof that he was responsible for executing the notorious Victorian serial killer Jack the Ripper. These claims are unsubstantiated, as police officials and others who attended the execution made no mention of any such event. Moreover, Cream was in prison at the time of the Ripper murders in 1888, so it would have been impossible for him to be Jack the Ripper.

Ripperologist Donald Bell speculated that Cream had bribed officials and been let out of prison before his official release, and Sir Edward Marshall-Hall speculated that Cream's prison term had been served by a look-alike in his place. Such notions are extremely unlikely and contradict all known evidence given by the Illinois authorities, newspapers of the time, Cream's solicitors, Cream's family, and Cream himself.

One of Cream's biographers suggested that Cream, on the scaffold and about to be hanged, was so frightened that he lost control of his bodily functions and stammered "I am ejaculating", which could have been mistaken for "I am Jack".

English-Canadian writer Chris Scott won an Arthur Ellis Award for Best Crime Novel in 1989 for Jack, a novel based on the premise that Cream was Jack the Ripper.

== Analysis ==
The motivation for the series of poisonings has never been settled. It has generally been assumed that Cream was a sadist who enjoyed the thought of his victims' agonised deaths, and his control over them (even if he was not physically present to witness these). However, Cream was also interested in money, as evidenced by his attempts at extortion in almost all of his crimes, so it remains a possibility that he committed the murders as part of ill-planned attempts to profit from them. From the start of the series of crimes Cream wrote blackmail notes to prominent people, and the poisoning of his one known male victim, Daniel Stott, was committed with the hope that Stott's wealthy widow would share the deceased's estate with him.

In addition to the five poisonings Cream was convicted of, he is suspected of the murder of his wife Flora Brooks in 1877, and of at least four other women who died in his care while undergoing abortions.

== In popular culture ==
Charles Laughton played Dr. Neil Cream in episode #438 of the CBS Radio series Suspense, which aired September 17, 1951.

Cream was the main antagonist of the 1990 BBC Four radio play, Sherlock Holmes: The Adventure Of The Pimlico Poisoner.

In the first episode (in 2000) of Murder Rooms: Mysteries of the Real Sherlock Holmes, the young Arthur Conan Doyle and Joseph Bell pursue a murder case that involves a Thomas Neill, played by Alec Newman. At the end, a postscript further identifies him as Thomas Neill Cream, who attended medical school alongside Conan Doyle.

In the 2015 BBC One television series River, Cream appears frequently to and converses with D.I. John River as a "manifest".

== See also ==
- List of serial killers in the United Kingdom
