= Sandfields, Swansea =

District in Swansea, Wales

Coordinates: 51.6165°N 3.94994°W

Sandfields is a district in Swansea, Wales bounded by St. Helen's Road to the north, Oystermouth Road and Swansea Bay to the south and Dillwyn Street to the east. The area is adjacent to and immediately west of Swansea city centre. The district does not exist officially as a geographical area or a local authority community area. Sandfields also does not have a specific postcode.

The original Sandfields covered a larger area than it does now, derived from the area known as 'The Burrows' which extended from Brynmill Lane in the west up to the West Pier by the mouth of the River Tawe.

== Notable buildings and landmarks ==
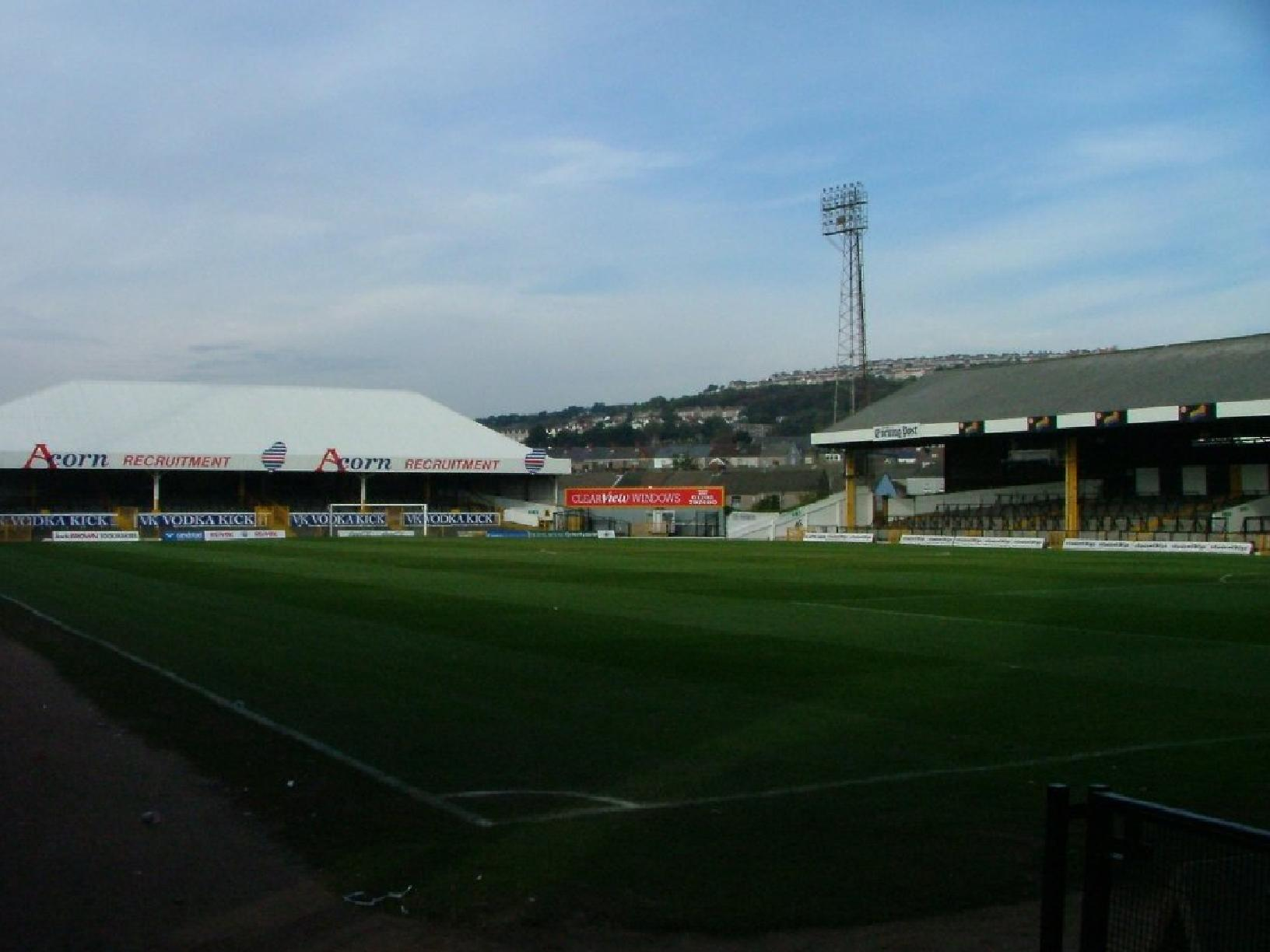
The Vetch Field was the home of Swansea City from 1912 to 2005. It was demolished in 2011.

The modern Sandfields area contains many notable Swansea buildings and landmarks. Swansea Crown Court is housed in a building situated on the far south-west corner of Sandfields, opposite the city's Guildhall.

Located at the east end of Sandfields is the former site of the Vetch Field football ground, home of Swansea City A.F.C. from the club's formation in 1912 until its 2005 move to the Liberty Stadium in Landore. In August 2011 it was confirmed by Swansea Council that the former football ground would be demolished and the site used temporarily for allotments. A barracks for the Territorial Army is located adjacent to the former Vetch site, with Swansea Prison also located nearby.

Small privately owned hotels and guest houses line Oystermouth Road, the southern sea-facing boundary of Sandfields. A local landmark along the seafront is the Trafalgar Arch, an opening in an old railway embankment. Dylan Thomas' short story 'Just Like Little Dogs' was set entirely under this archway.

On the foreshore, behind the Civic Centre, prehistoric fish traps and possible track ways have been found, estimated to be over 5,000 years old. Although these are not considered to be located within the modern Sandfields district, they indicate that the area has been populated for thousands of years.
