= Bartholomew Binns =

English executioner (1839–1911)

- Born: 1839
- Died: 1911 (aged 71–72)
- Occupation: Executioner
- Years active: 1883–84
- Known for: Botched hangings

Bartholomew Binns (1839–1911) was an English executioner from November 1883 to March 1884. When William Marwood died on 4 September 1883 after a brief illness, Binns was appointed to the position of Executioner for the City of London and Middlesex. Before becoming hangman, Binns was employed as foreman platelayer at Dewsbury by the Lancashire and Yorkshire Railway Company, but after he got the post he no longer worked anywhere.

Like many hangmen of his day, Binns had no formal training and carried out executions according to his own methods and concepts. He executed nine men and two women, but his short career was "littered with complaints of drunkenness and incompetence". His first unassisted execution was that of Henry Powell on 6 November 1883 at Wandsworth Prison.

One of the executions Binns seriously botched was that of Henry Dutton on 3 December 1883. The 22-year-old Dutton was to die for the murder of his wife's grandmother. Dutton weighed just 128 pounds and was given a drop of 7'6" using an over-thick rope with the eyelet positioned at the back of his neck. Death resulted from strangulation. The doctor at the prison was dissatisfied with the way Binns had conducted the hanging, and there was a strong suspicion that Binns had been drinking beforehand.

The last execution Binns carried out was the hanging of 18-year-old Michael McLean in Liverpool at Kirkdale Gaol on 10 March 1884. Major Leggett, the governor of Kirkdale Gaol, said that he thought "that Binns had no idea how to do his work satisfactorily". He also said that Binns had been drunk when he arrived at the jail on the Saturday afternoon. When he turned up drunk, the under sheriffs sent a telegram to Samuel Heath who had been Binns' assistant the week before, to assist him. Binns refused Heath's assistance and insisted on carrying out the execution alone. After the trapdoor was released, McLean lost consciousness pretty immediately. Binns, unable to measure correctly the fall of 9 feet 6 inches which he had announced, had given him a drop of 10 feet 8 1/2 inches. It eventually took 13 minutes for McLean's heart to stop. After the formal complaint about this and Binns' drunken behaviour, his employers, the sheriffs and aldermen of London and Middlesex, sacked him a few days later.

In November 1884 Binns appeared in court after having accused his mother-in-law of stealing his watch. During the case his daughter alleged that he had carried out various experiments on hanging cats and dogs at his home.

Binns later assisted Thomas Henry Scott in several hangings in Ireland around the turn of the century. His last job was the execution of John Toole on 7 March 1901. Binns died in 1911.

== See also ==
- List of executioners
