= William Billington =

British hangman (1875–1952)

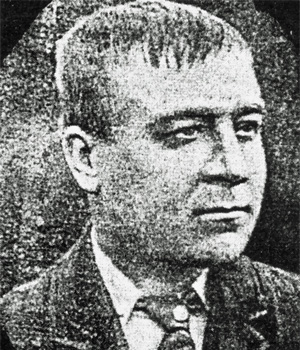
- Born: 1875; Standish, England
- Died: 1952 (aged 76–77)
- Occupation: Executioner
- Years active: 1899–1905
- Spouse: Catherine
- Children: 2
- Parent(s): Clara Smith (adopted); Alice Billington; James Billington
- Relatives: Billington family Thomas Billington (brother); John Billington (brother)

William Billington (1875 – 1952) was an English executioner. He was on the Home Office list from 1902 to 1905 and had participated in hangings from 1899.

== Career ==
Billington, second son of executioner James Billington, carried out his first hanging in July 1899. Even though he was later 'adopted' by his mother's extremely close friend,Clara Smith, as he and his mother lived with for the end of his younger years. It is unsure why his mother moved in with her and how she accomplished such. Many think they could've been more than friends. He later assisted his father in several more commissions throughout the rest of 1899, and underwent formal training in early 1900. He was also an assistant executioner in 1900.

After his father died in December 1901, William became the principal executioner for England. He was at first assisted by his older brother Thomas and then by his younger brother John, along with Henry Pierrepoint. He was a small celebrity during this period among the populace, many of whom wanted to catch a glimpse of this relatively young man who was the country's executioner. Billington carried out the vast majority of executions from 1902 to 1904. He carried out the last one to take place at Newgate Prison on 2 May 1902 and the first at Pentonville on 30 September 1902. He also performed a few executions in Ireland.

Billington was married with two children, but he also had problems with alcohol. In the summer of 1905, he served a one-month prison sentence for failing to pay money to his wife in compliance with a separation order. While he was in prison, his brother and execution partner, John, died. William's last execution was on 25 April 1905. All in all, he carried out 58 hangings as the chief executioner and assisted at 14 more. In his later years, he apparently tried to shun his past as an executioner. He died in 1952.

== See also ==
- List of executioners
