= Thomas Pierrepoint =

English executioner (1870–1954)

- Born: Thomas William Pierrepoint; 6 October 1870; Sutton Bonington, Nottinghamshire, England
- Died: 11 February 1954 (aged 83); Bradford, West Riding of Yorkshire, England
- Citizenship: British
- Occupation: Executioner
- Years active: 1906–1946
- Spouse: Elizabeth Binns (m. 1891)
- Children: 1
- Parent(s): Thomas and Mary Pierrepoint
- Relatives: Henry Pierrepoint (brother), Albert Pierrepoint (nephew)

Thomas William Pierrepoint (6 October 1870 – 11 February 1954) was an English executioner from 1906 until 1946. He was the brother of Henry Pierrepoint and uncle of Albert Pierrepoint.

== Personal life ==
Pierrepoint was born in Sutton Bonington, Nottinghamshire, in 1870, the second child and eldest son of Thomas Pierrepoint, a plate layer on the railway, and Ann Pierrepoint, formerly Marriott. The Pierrepoint family were still living in Sutton Bonington at the time of the 1881 census, but by the 1891 census they had moved to Clayton, near Bradford, Yorkshire, where Thomas and his father were employed as stone quarrymen. He was married to Elizabeth Binns on 5 December 1891.

By 1914, Pierrepoint had taken on a number of "sidelines", including a carrier service founded by his brother, a small farm, and an illegal bookmaking business.

== Career ==
Thomas Pierrepoint began working as a hangman in 1906 under the influence of his brother, Henry. His career spanned 39 years, and ended in 1946, by which time he was in his mid-seventies. During this time, he is thought to have carried out 294 hangings, 203 of which were civilians executed in England and Wales; the remainder were executions carried out abroad or upon military personnel. Among those he executed was the poisoner Frederick Seddon in 1912 and double murderer Dr Buck Ruxton in 1936.

During World War II he was appointed as executioner by the US military and was responsible for 13 out of 16 hangings of US soldiers at the Shepton Mallet military prison in Somerset. He executed George Johnson Armstrong on 9 July 1941 at Wandsworth Prison because he was spying for the Germans. In this capacity, Pierrepoint carried out executions not only for murder but also rape which, at the time, was a capital crime under US military law although not in British law. In six of these cases he was assisted by his nephew Albert – who was principal hangman for the remaining three executions.

In 1940, his medical fitness for the job was questioned by a medical officer who called him "unsecure" and doubted "whether his sight was good". The Prison Commission discreetly asked for reports on his performance during subsequent executions, and one report said that he had "smelled strongly of drink" on two occasions when reporting at a prison. His name was eventually removed from the list of executioners and he received no further invitations to conduct executions. He died at his daughter's home in Bradford on 11 February 1954, aged 83.

== Bibliography ==
- Fielding, Steve (2008). Pierrepoint: A Family of Executioners. London: John Blake Publishing Ltd. ISBN 978-1-84454-611-4.
- Craddock, Jeremy (2021). The Jigsaw Murders: The True Story of the Ruxton Killings and the Birth of Modern Forensics. Cheltenham: The History Press. ISBN 978-0-75099-767-6.
