= John Ellis (executioner) =

British executioner (1874-1932)

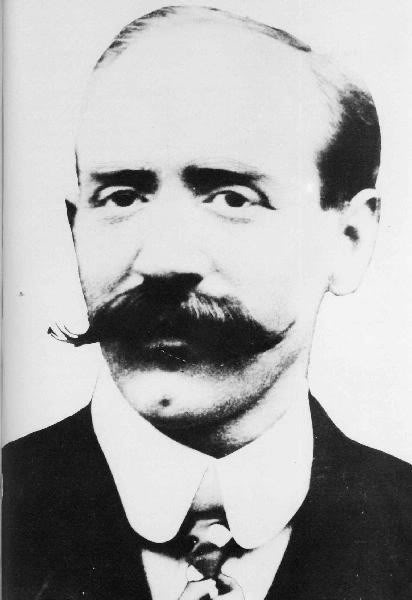
- John Ellis
- Born: 4 October 1874; Balderstone, Rochdale, Lancashire, England, UK
- Died: 20 September 1932 (aged 57); Castleton, Lancashire, England
- Cause of death: Suicide
- Citizenship: British
- Occupation: Executioner
- Years active: 1901–1924
- Parent(s): Joseph and Sarah Ellis

John Ellis (4 October 1874 – 20 September 1932) was a British executioner for 23 years, from 1901 to 1924. His other occupations were as a Rochdale hairdresser and newsagent.

== Personal life ==
Born in Balderstone, Rochdale on 4 October 1874, he first worked in a series of jobs as a casual labourer in and around Manchester before gaining a job at a spinning mill in Bury. After another stint in a factory he decided to follow his father's trade by becoming a barber and hairdresser in Rochdale, where he subsequently also opened a newsagent's shop, which he ran with his wife and children.

== Career ==
At the age of 22 he applied to the Home Office to become an executioner and was invited to attend training at Newgate Prison. He first participated in an execution in Newcastle in December 1901, as assistant to William Billington. Ellis served as Chief Executioner from 1907 and was involved in a total of 203 executions.

Among the executions he performed were those of Hawley Harvey Crippen (known as Dr. Crippen) in 1910, Frederick Seddon in 1912, Sir Roger Casement in 1916, Herbert Rowse Armstrong in 1922, and Edith Thompson in 1923. The ordeal of executing Edith Thompson in 1923 had a profound effect on Ellis. Thompson had collapsed in terror at the prospect of her hanging and, unconscious, had to be supported on the gallows by four prison warders. Various accounts report, "that guards had to tie her to a small wooden chair before drawing the noose around her neck", and that "she was hanged in a bosun's chair".

== Resignation and death ==
Ellis resigned from his post in March 1924. Whether this was due to his experiences at the Thompson hanging is open to dispute, especially since he performed 11 more executions (among which was one of another woman) before he withdrew. Ellis took to drinking heavily, and attempted suicide in 1924 by shooting himself in the jaw.

Suicide was at that time a criminal offence, and Ellis was charged and bound over for 12 months at Rochdale Magistrates Court. Eight years later, in September 1932, after another bout of heavy drinking, Ellis died by suicide, cutting his throat with a razor.

== Controversy ==
Ellis' relations with his fellow executioners were strained. Henry Pierrepoint was struck off the list of executioners following a complaint by Ellis. Pierrepoint, arriving at Chelmsford prison slightly intoxicated on 13 July 1910, had started a row, and would have attacked Ellis, had not warders intervened. Pierrepoint's brother Thomas, also an executioner, is reported to have said that "it was impossible to work with" Ellis.

Ellis appeared as an executioner in the play The Life and Adventures of Charles Peace, which opened in Gravesend in December, 1927. This attracted a degree of controversy as some considered his participation inappropriate. Attendances dwindled and after the production closed, Ellis used the scaffold as part of his tours.

== See also ==
- List of executioners
- Hanging
- Capital punishment

== Sources ==
- Fielding, Steve (2008), The Executioner's Bible, John Blake Publishing, ISBN 978-1-84454-648-0
