= James Billington (executioner) =

British hangman (1847-1901)

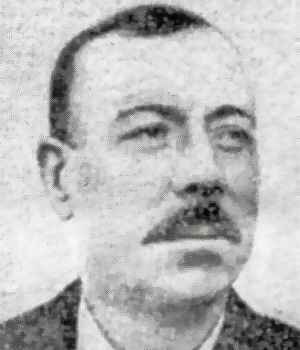
- Born: James Billington; 5 March 1847; Preston, Lancashire, England
- Died: 13 December 1901 (aged 54); Bolton, Lancashire, England
- Occupation: Executioner
- Years active: 1884–1901
- Known for: Several hangings in England.
- Children: 3 sons, William Billington; John Billington; Thomas Billington
- Parent: James Billington Sr.
- Relatives: Billington family

James Billington (5 March 1847 – 13 December 1901) was a hangman for the British government from 1884 until 1901. He was the patriarch of the Billington family of executioners. Billington died at home from emphysema in the early hours of 13 December 1901, ten days after having executed Patrick McKenna, a man he knew well.

== Early life ==
Billington was born in Preston, Lancashire, the son of James, a labourer from Preston, and Mary Haslam of Bolton. In 1859 he moved with his family to Farnworth, northwest of Manchester.

After leaving school he worked in a cotton mill for a time, but by the early 1880s he had become a Sunday school teacher and was running a barbershop in Market Street, Farnworth. He also worked for some time as a wrestler, miner and pub singer.

Billington had a "lifelong fascination" with hanging, and made replica gallows in his back yard on which he practised with weights and dummies and, it was rumoured locally, stray dogs and cats. In an interview published in the Edinburgh Evening News on 28 August 1884, however, he denied this claim, saying: "I have experimented in my own way, though I have not, as has been said, taken the lives of cats and other domestic animals. For the purpose of my experiments I made a small scaffold and erected in my yard at home, using dummies and weights as my subjects."

Following the death of William Marwood in 1883, a vacancy arose for the post of Executioner for the City of London and Middlesex. Of the more than 100 applicants, Billington was one of three short-listed to be interviewed, but the job was offered to Bartholomew Binns. Undaunted, Billington wrote to other English prison authorities offering his services as a hangman, an offer that was eventually taken up by the authorities in Yorkshire.

== Career as an executioner, 1884–1901 ==
Billington's first engagement was the execution of Joseph Laycock at Armley Gaol in Leeds, on 26 August 1884. Laycock, a hawker from Sheffield, had been convicted of the murder of his wife and four children. In 1891, Billington succeeded James Berry as chief executioner of Great Britain and Ireland.

The 1896 execution of Charles Thomas Wooldridge was immortalised by Oscar Wilde in his The Ballad of Reading Gaol. Wooldridge, known as "C.T.W" in the poem, was a trooper serving with the Royal Horse Guards in Windsor who had killed his wife Laura with a cut-throat razor during a fit of jealous rage. Wilde recounts that the condemned man seemed resigned to his fate on the gallows, and Wooldridge even petitioned the Home Secretary requesting that he not be reprieved, despite a plea for clemency submitted by the jury at his trial and various petitions organised by the residents of Berkshire. He told the prison chaplain that he wanted to die in payment for his crime, and he was allowed to carry his regimental colours to the gallows. Given a drop longer than specified by the official Table of Drops, the force of his fall when the trapdoor was released stretched his neck by "an almost incredible eleven inches".

Billington executed serial poisoner Thomas Neill Cream on 15 November 1892. Billington claimed that Cream's last words as he fell were "I am Jack the...", and that this was a confession to having been Jack the Ripper. Cream had, however, been confined in Chicago's Joliet State Penitentiary at the time of the Ripper murders.

Billington's final execution was of a man he knew well, Patrick McKenna. The pair knew each other because McKenna was a regular at the Derby Arms public house in Churchgate, Bolton, at that time Billington's home. McKenna killed his wife after she refused to give him money to buy beer, and Billington was one of a number of men who happened to be near the scene of the crime and succeeded in detaining McKenna until the arrival of the police. McKenna was sentenced on 13 November 1901, and was hanged at Strangeways Prison on 3 December. Although Billington was suffering badly from chronic emphysema, he managed to perform the execution, but immediately returned home to Bolton, where he died ten days later, at the age of 54.

== Legacy ==
All three of Billington's sons – Thomas, William, and John – followed in their father's footsteps and became hangmen. Thomas died within a month of his father, but William and John carried on their occupation until 1905. William was removed from the list of official executioners after he was sentenced to serve one month in Wakefield Gaol for failing to maintain his wife and their two children, who had been admitted to a workhouse in Bolton. His brother John died of pleurisy in October 1905, brought on by injuries he had sustained two months earlier at Leeds Gaol when he fell through the open trapdoor of the gallows. William Billington attempted to shun his past as an executioner in his later years, and died in 1952.

Some of Billington's descendants would venture into the world of combat sports and professional wrestling, such as Tom Billington (better known as Dynamite Kid) and Davey Boy Smith.

== Notable executions ==
- Thomas Neill Cream, serial killer; hanged on 15 November 1892
- James Canham Read, murderer; hanged on 4 December 1894
- Amelia Dyer, serial killer; hanged on 10 June 1896
- Charles Thomas Wooldridge, royal trooper who killed his wife; hanged on 7 July 1896
