= Friedrich Reindel =

Prussian executioner (1824–1908)

Friedrich Reindel (6 September 1824, in Werben (Elbe) – 27 September 1908, in Magdeburg) was Royal Prussian executioner (German: Scharfrichter) from 1873 to 1898. Responsible for carrying out capital punishment in the Prussian provinces, he executed a total of 213 people by beheading with an axe.

== Executioner ==
Executions in Prussia were carried out by members of the Reindel family, a "dynasty of executioners" from Werben (Elbe). Friedrich Reindel, younger brother of the executioner of the North German Confederation Wilhelm Reindel who had died in 1872, started his "career" in Braunschweig in 1873.

Popular European media showed ghoulish fascination with German executions, as with an illustration from Le Petit Parisien of the infamous executioner Reindel demonstrating his skill in Berlin Prison, 1891.

Friedrich Reindel retired in 1898, and his son Wilhelm had to resign in 1901 when, after continuous reports about his drunkenness and "feeble-minded" appearance at work, he was unable to cut off a victim's head with the first blow of his axe.

In 1900 Friedrich Reindel's son-in-law Alwin Engelhardt, a barman, who had assisted the family at a number of executions, also passed the examination set for Lorenz Schwietz and was officially approved as state executioner.

== See also ==
- List of executioners
- Royal Prussian executioner Julius Krautz at de.wikipedia.org
- Royal Prussian executioner Friedrich Reindel at de.wikipedia.org
- Carl Gröpler
