= Adolf Seefeldt =

German serial killer

- Seefeldt's booking photo in 1935
- Born: Adolf Gustav Seefeldt; 6 March 1870; Potsdam, Kingdom of Prussia, North German Confederation
- Died: 23 May 1936 (aged 66); Schwerin, Nazi Germany
- Cause of death: Execution by guillotine
- Other names: "The Sandman" "Uncle Tick Tock" "Uncle Adi"; Adolf Seefeld
- Status: Executed
- Conviction: Murder
- Penalty: Death

Details
- Victims: 12+
- Span of crimes: 1908–1935
- Country: German Empire, Weimar Republic, Nazi Germany (now Germany)

Adolf Gustav Seefeldt (6 March 1870 – 23 May 1936), known as The Sandman, was a German serial killer.

== Life ==
=== Early life ===
Born as the seventh and youngest child of his parents, Adolf was initially trained as a locksmith, then as a watchmaker who repaired grandfather clocks and pocket watches. He moved to Lübeck in 1890 and married Katarina Seefeldt, who divorced him in 1910. His son was committed to a lunatic asylum for moral crimes at the age of nineteen.

Seefeldt was reportedly abused by two men at the age of 12. He was first imprisoned at 25 for the sexual harassment of a boy. Psychiatrists diagnosed him as mentally unstable, which led to him spending most of his life in mental hospitals and prisons.

=== Serial murders ===
The traveler and watchmaker Adolf Seefeldt, also known as "Sandman" or—because of his profession—"Uncle Tick Tock" and "Uncle Adi," abused and killed at least twelve boys during the reign of the Third Reich. He usually selected pine groves as crime scenes, with one exception. A common feature among the victims was their clothing, as they consistently wore sailor suits. Since all the children appeared to be “sleeping peacefully” and showed no signs of external violence, the police were mystified by the circumstances of death. It is therefore possible that Seefeldt committed additional murders that were misclassified as natural deaths.

Contemporary experts speculated that Seefeldt used his own homemade poison, chloroform, or smothered his victims. According to Hans Pfeiffer, a well-known author of popular science books on authentic criminal cases, these theories were easily disproven. Pfeiffer instead suspected that Seefeldt had placed his victims into a hypnotic sleep, then likely performed oral sex on them and left them asleep in the woods, failing to awaken them from hypnosis. The children later died of hypothermia, which Seefeldt had either accepted or intended.

== The victims ==
His victims ranged from toddlers to 12-year-old boys: Kurt Gnirk (16 April 1933), Wolfgang Metzdorf (8 October 1933), Ernst Tesdorf (2 November 1933), Alfred Prätorius (12 November 1933), Hans Korn (16 January 1934), Günter Tieske from Oranienburg (2 October 1934), 11-year-old Erwin Wishnewski from Brandenburg (8 October 1934), 4-year-old Artur Dill and 5-year-old Edgar "Eipel" Dittrich (16 October 1934, both found in Neuruppin), 10-year-old Hans-Joachim Neumann (killed 16 February 1935; found on 20 June 1935), 10-year-old Heinz Zimmerman (23 February 1935), and 11-year-old Gustav Thomas (22 March 1935). The investigative authorities assumed that the actual number of casualties was much higher, possibly claiming up to 100 lives.

=== Gustav Thomas case ===
The lawyer Wilhelm Hallermann summarized the murder case of 11-year-old Gustav Thomas (found in a pine forest near Wittenberge), stating that microscopic examinations revealed bloodshot pressure, indicating strangulation.

The medical examiner Victor Müller-Heß testified during the murder trial against Seefeldt, asserting that the victims were not poisoned but instead strangled.

== Trial and execution ==
The Schwerin jury, under the chairmanship of District Court Director Karl Friedrich Sarkander and the advisory District Court Councils Wilms and Weise, consisted of butcher Ernst Hahn from Crivitz, secretary Wilhelm Schneeweis from Schwerin, Ortsgruppenleiter Friedrich Jahnke from Parchim, Mayor Ernst Dubbe from Leussow, engineer Otto Arpke from Lübtheen, and city councilor Kreisleiter Buhr from Ludwigslust. The case was heard on January 21, 1936. The chief prosecutor was Wilhelm Beusch, whom Bishop Bernhard Schräder recalled in connection with the case of Vicar Leo Wiemker.

In the presence of the later war criminal and Reichsstatthalter of Mecklenburg, Friedrich Hildebrandt railed against the accused to justify the eradication of such behavior. Adolf Seefeldt's defense lawyer was Rudolf Neudeck. August Brüning (1877–1965) was a participating expert in the trial.

After the closing arguments of February 21, the verdict for the murder cases was announced the following day. Seefeldt was sentenced to death. According to the Niederdeutschen Beobachter on February 29, 1936, Seefeldt is said to have filed an appeal. Neither a revision nor a revision procedure is historically documented; the judgment was enforced after legal force and the denial of a pardon on May 23, 1936. The records of Seefeldt's conviction are poor. In addition to newspaper reports of his execution, there are only two memory protocols of conversations conducted in April 1936 in his cell in Schwerin. The case of Adolf Seefeldt was discussed by J. Fischer and Johannes Lange in the Monthly Journal of Forensic Biology and Penal Reform.

=== Execution ===
Earlier, the executioner Carl Gröpler had visited him and "recognized the expected difficulty of the execution." Seefeldt was allegedly eager to be beheaded the next morning by the guillotine.

== See also ==
- List of German serial killers

== Literature ==
- Matthias Blazek: Executions in Prussia and the German Reich 1866–1945. ibidem-Verlag, Stuttgart 2010. ISBN 978-3-8382-0107-8
- P. Böttger: Dogs in the service of the criminal police with special consideration of the Seefeldt murder case. Leipzig 1937
- Kerstin Brückweh: Mordlust – serial murders, violence and emotions in the 20th century. Campus Verlag, Frankfurt am Main 2006. ISBN 978-3-593-38202-9 Auszugsweise online – Digitalisat
- Erich Ebermayer: „Uncle Tick Tack. The boy murderer Adolf Seefeldt“. In: Robert A. Stemmle [Hrsg.]: Sexual crime (The New Pitaval; Bd. 13). München [u. a.] 1967, p. 11–38
- Jens Haberland: „Adolf Seefeldt – an unsolved mystery“. In: ders.: Serial killers in the 20th century. Berlin 1997. ISBN 3-930057-38-7, p. 125–129
- Hans Peiffer: „The Sandman – Adolf Seefeldt (1933–1935)“. In: Wolfgang Schüler [Hrsg.]: Serial murder in Germany. Leipzig 2005. ISBN 3-86189-729-6. S. 16–36 (online (S. 146 ff.)), Retrieved on May 30, 2014
- Ulrich Zander: "The hunt for the 'Sandman'" The trial of serial killer Adolf Seefeldt began 80 years in Schwerin. Wandering clockmaker killed twelve boys. In: Schweriner Volkszeitung / Mecklenburg-Magazin (29. Januar 2016), p. 24.
- Frank-Rainer Schurich, Michael Stricker: The serial killer Adolf Seefeldt and modern criminals. Verlag Dr. Köster, Berlin 2015, ISBN 978-3-89574-875-2
- Frank-Rainer Schurich, Michael Stricker: The beast from the forest. Historical criminal case. Verlag Dr. Köster, Berlin 2015, ISBN 978-3-89574-887-5
