= Jewish Responses to Persecution =

Jewish Responses to Persecution is a book series that reprints and analyzes primary source texts by Jews to understand the Jewish response to persecution by Nazi Germany between 1933 and 1946. It was sponsored by the United States Holocaust Memorial Museum.

== Works ==
- Matthäus, Jürgen; Roseman, Mark (2010). Jewish Responses to Persecution: 1933-1938. Rowman & Littlefield. ISBN 978-0-7591-1908-6.
- Garbarini, Alexandra; Kerenji, Emil; Lambertz, Jan; Patt, Avinoam (2011). Jewish Responses to Persecution: 1938–1940. Vol. 2. Rowman & Littlefield. ISBN 978-0-7591-2039-6.
- Matthäus, Jürgen (2013). Jewish Responses to Persecution: 1941–1942. AltaMira Press. ISBN 978-0-7591-2259-8.
- Kerenji, Emil (2014). Jewish Responses to Persecution: 1942–1943. Rowman & Littlefield. ISBN 978-1-4422-3627-1.
- Wolfson, Leah (2015). Jewish Responses to Persecution: 1944–1946. Rowman & Littlefield. ISBN 978-1-4422-4337-8.
- Matthäus, Jürgen (2017). Jewish Responses to Persecution, 1933–1946: A Source Reader. Rowman & Littlefield. ISBN 978-1-5381-0176-6.
