= Schwietz =

Schwietz is a surname. Notable people with the surname include:

- Lorenz Schwietz (1850–1925), German executioner
- Roger Lawrence Schwietz (born 1940), American clergy
