= Friedrich Schumann =

German serial killer (1893–1921)

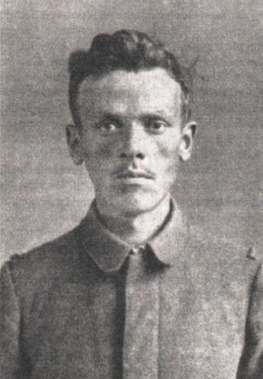
- Schumann in 1919
- Born: Friedrich Schumann; 1 February 1893; Spandau, German Empire
- Died: 27 August 1921 (aged 28); Plötzensee Prison, Berlin, Weimar Republic
- Other name: Terror of Falkenhagen Lake
- Status: Executed by beheading
- Convictions: Murder (6 counts); Attempted murder (11 counts); Rape; Burglary
- Penalty: Death

Details
- Victims: 9–25
- Span of crimes: 1909–1920
- Country: Germany
- State: Berlin
- Date apprehended: 20 August 1920

Friedrich Schumann (1 February 1893 – 27 August 1921) was a German serial killer. He is also known as "Massenmörder vom Falkenhagener See" ("Terror of Falkenhagen Lake"). Schumann murdered at least seven people and raped 11 women. He was 28 years old when he was executed in 1921.

== Murders ==
Schumann was born in 1893 in Spandau. His father had a long criminal record and suffered from alcoholism, and his grandfather had been convicted of pedophilia. He bought his first gun at a young age, practising by shooting at the local wildlife. When he was sixteen, he killed his female cousin, claiming that the gun accidentally went off while he was playing with it, spending some time at a correctional institution as a result. After completing his locksmith apprenticeship, he was conscripted into the German army. He fought in the First World War, where he was awarded the Iron Cross 2nd class for his excellent marksmanship. After the war ended, he struggled to adjust to civilian life and embarked on his criminal career. Over the course of three years Schumann committed 7 murders, 15 attempted murders, 5 arsons, 11 rapes and a series of thefts and robberies. On 18 August 1919 Schumann shot 52-year-old forester Wilhelm Nielbock from Spandau, which became his undoing. On 20 August 1919, he was arrested in Berlin. The trial against Schumann started on 5 July 1920 in Berlin.

== Trial and execution ==
Friedrich Schumann was convicted of murder, and on 13 July 1920, was sentenced to death.

On 27 August 1921, at 6 a.m., Schumann was executed in the courtyard of the Plötzensee Prison by Prussian executioner (Scharfrichter) Carl Gröpler, using the axe.

The Berlin lawyer Erich Frey (who would later go on to defend Carl Großmann) later recalled his brief encounter with the executioner:

At the end of the corridor, I had to give way to a broad-shouldered man. He looked like a transport worker; the high-buttoned formal jacket looked strange on him. His closely-cropped skull rested upon a bull neck. In spite of the faint light, he looked suntanned and healthy. Never before had I seen executioner Gröpler from Magdeburg. But as he passed me with a slight bow, I knew it was him. Anyone who had any business in the Criminal Court of Justice knew about Gröpler. He had been a horse butcher previously.... each month he collected a small fixed salary, and had in return to be ready with his massive axe and his three skilled assistants at the demand of the State attorney. For every execution, he received 300 Marks plus his expenses. Gröpler went in to see his customers.... "You can go to him [Schumann] with no trouble," I heard the guard say to Gröpler in Berlin dialect, "he's got no nerves."

The evening before his execution, Schumann confessed to his lawyer that he had murdered 25 people.

== See also ==
- List of German serial killers

== Bibliography ==
- Matthias Blazek (2009), Carl Großmann und Friedrich Schumann – Zwei Serienmörder in den zwanziger Jahren, ibidem-Verlag, Stuttgart, ISBN 978-3-8382-0027-9 (in German)
- Christopher Berry-Dee (2011), Cannibal Serial Killers: Profiles of Depraved Flesh-Eating Murderers, Amazon Kindle, ISBN 978-1-56975-902-8, p. 204
- Erich Hobusch (2003), Wilddieberei und Förstermorde – Originalfassung seiner Bücher aus 1928–31 von Otto Busdorf, edition I-III, Neumann-Neudamm, Melsungen, ISBN 3-7888-0725-3 (in German)
- Martin Lücke (editor) (2013), Helden in der Krise, Didaktische Blicke auf die Geschichte der Männlichkeiten pt. 2, LIT Verlag Berlin-Münster-Wien-Zürich, ISBN 978-3-8258-1760-2, p. 172 (in German)
- Daniel Siemens (2007), Metropole und Verbrechen. Die Gerichtsreportage in Berlin, Paris und Chicago 1919–1933, Franz Steiner Verlag, Stuttgart, ISBN 978-3-515-09008-7 (in German)
- Emil Utitz (1926), Jahrbuch für Charakterologie, Pan-Verlag, Berlin (in German)
- Richard Wetzell (editor) (2014), Crime And Criminal Justice In Modern Germany (Studies in German History), ISBN 978-1-78238-246-1, p. 222
