= Carl Gröpler =

Prussian executioner (1868–1946)

Franz Friedrich Carl Gröpler (22 February 1868, Magdeburg – 30 January 1946, Magdeburg) was Royal Prussian executioner (German: Scharfrichter) from 1906 to 1937. Responsible for carrying out capital punishment in the Prussian provinces, he executed at least 144 people, primarily by beheading with an axe, but also with guillotines. Gröpler was one of the most famous executioners in Germany.

== Life ==
Franz Friedrich Carl Gröpler was a child of the railway worker and service man Heinrich Gröpler and his wife Auguste, born Anton, in Magdeburg. He was first a musician, then spent five years as a postal worker. Gröpler learned the horse butcher's trade and business and ran a laundry in Magdeburg named Aegir.

== Executioner ==
He wore a traditional tailcoat, top hat, and white gloves.

Gröpler was first assistant to the main Prussian executioner Lorenz Schwietz. When the Prussian executioner Alwin Engelhardt was dismissed in 1906, Gröpler took over his duties. Together with his successor Ernst Reindel, Gröpler was one of the last executioners in Germany performing executions by beheading with an axe. Depending on local circumstances he also operated the guillotine. Once Gröpler said before an execution to a prison officer: "Well, ... you passed an ugly night in the cell. Or don't you believe in God? I – yes! Otherwise I could not do that. Thou shalt not kill – who sheds blood, his blood shall be shed again – our laws are his (God's) laws –. In this knowledge I fulfill my duties."

The prison officer had been on death watch with a man condemned to death in his last night, discussing with him, prior to his decapitation, whether there was any sense in having a clergyman attending executions. Theodor Lessing nicknamed Gröpler, who had executed Fritz Haarmann in 1925, "the red judge".

In April 1924 Gröpler signed a contract that made him the sole executioner in Northern Germany. In addition to a regular salary of 136 gold marks per month, he was paid 60 gold marks for every execution, and 50 gold marks were paid to each of his agents. At the end of the Weimar Republic, Gröpler had only a few execution orders. This only changed with the increasing number of executions since the takeover by the Nazis in 1933. Gröpler renewed his annual contract with a salary of 1,500 Reichsmarks per year and a fee of 50 Reichsmark per execution. That Gröpler performed the Nazi salute during the executions at each interim report earned him an admonition to refrain from such practices.

On 2 July 1931 the 48-year-old German serial killer Peter Kürten, who once described himself as the Vampire of Düsseldorf and as a wild animal, was executed in the Cologne prison, Klingelpütz, with the Fallbeil (guillotine). The execution was carried out by Carl Gröpler. The Fallbeil, that he had brought with him from Magdeburg, had not been used for five years.

Time quoted on 13 July 1931: "Herr Groepler, a stolid individual whose profession forces him to lead a rather unsocial existence, left his cosy home in Magdeburg last week with a bag of tools and a coil of new rope. He took the train to the Prussian State Prison at Klingelpuetz, near Cologne. In the prison yard he disappeared into a dusty, dilapidated shed. Prisoners tense in their cells heard him hammering, hammering, filing metal all day long."

One of the last executions with the axe were the executions of the Baroness Benita von Falkenhayn and her friend Renate von Natzmer. The two had been sentenced by the People's Court on charges of espionage and were beheaded by Gröpler on 18 February 1935 in Plötzensee Prison.

Carl Gröpler is credited with at least 144 executions in his 30 years of service. In 1937, he was forced to retire. He was replaced by his assistant, the knacker Ernst Reindel from Gommern.

== Death ==
In 1945, Carl Gröpler was arrested by the Soviet military at his residence in Magdeburg. The arrest was presumably based on the 1934 execution of four communists, which Gröpler had performed in Hamburg Remand Prison. Gröpler died in custody on 30 January 1946.

== Notable executions ==
- 27 August 1921: Friedrich Schumann, serial killer
- 15 April 1925: Fritz Haarmann, serial killer
- 17 November 1925: Fritz Angerstein, mass murderer
- 2 July 1931: Peter Kürten, serial killer
- 18 February 1935: Benita von Falkenhayn and Renate von Natzmer, spies
- 23 May 1936: Adolf Seefeldt, serial killer

== See also ==
- List of executioners
- Friedrich Schumann
- Fritz Haarmann
- Peter Kürten

== Sources ==
=== Bibliography ===
- Blazek, Matthias (2010). Scharfrichter in Preußen und im Deutschen Reich 1866–1945 (in German). ibidem, Stuttgart. ISBN 978-3-8382-0107-8.
- Evans, Richard J. (1996). Rituals of retribution. Capital punishment in Germany, 1600–1987 (in German). Oxford University Press. ISBN 0-19-821968-7.
- Blazek, Matthias (2009): Scharfrichter Carl Gröpler – der rote Richter. In: Matthias Blazek: Haarmann und Grans – Der Fall, die Beteiligten und die Presseberichterstattung. ibidem, Stuttgart. ISBN 978-3-89821-967-9. (in German)
- Blazek, Matthias (2011): "Der Magdeburger Scharfrichter Carl Gröpler – Ein Blick in die Geschichte der Magdeburger Kriminalgerichtsbarkeit", in: Magdeburger Kurier – Informationen für Bürger im aktiven Ruhestand, 18th year, February–September 2011. (in German)
- Blazek, Matthias (2011): "Herr Staatsanwalt, das Urteil ist vollstreckt." Die Brüder Wilhelm und Friedrich Reindel: Scharfrichter im Dienste des Norddeutschen Bundes und Seiner Majestät 1843–1898. ibidem, Stuttgart. ISBN 978-3-8382-0277-8. (in German)
- Waltenbacher, Thomas (2008): Zentrale Hinrichtungsstätten. Der Vollzug der Todesstrafe in Deutschland von 1937–1945. Scharfrichter im Dritten Reich. Zwilling, Berlin. ISBN 978-3-00-024265-6. (in German)
