= Benita von Falkenhayn =

German baroness and spy (1900–1935)

Benita Ursula Freifrau von Falkenhayn, maiden name von Zollikofer-Altenklingen (14 August 1900 – 18 February 1935) was a German baroness who served as a spy for the Second Polish Republic.

== Life ==
Falkenhayn was born in Berlin to the noble Zollikofer family, which for centuries had held Altenklingen Castle in the Swiss Thurgau region. She first married retired Senior Lieutenant Müller-Eckhardt (1920–1922) and secondly her childhood friend, retired Senior Lieutenant Richard von Falkenhayn (1923–1930), a distant relative of World War I General Erich von Falkenhayn. She took on the name von Falkenhayn upon her second marriage. However, the couple divorced on 18 December 1930 by mutual agreement, and on 18 October 1932 she was married to the aircraft engineer Baron Josef von Berg, whereafter her name was actually Baroness Benita Ursula von Berg. This third marriage was annulled by a court on 19 October 1934, when she was already arrested, after which she re-adopted the name of her second husband.

In the late 1920s, Falkenhayn became friends with the Polish intelligence agent Major Jerzy Sosnowski, whom she had met at the horse races, and became his lover. He made her socialise with employees at the Ministry of the Reichswehr to obtain secret documents concerning the preparations for a German Invasion of Poland. At least from 1932, her activities were monitored by the Abwehr intelligence agency, and upon Sosnowki's exposure on 27 February 1934, Falkenhayn was arrested together with her friend Renate von Natzmer, his other lover. One year later, on 16 February 1935, both women were found guilty of espionage and treason in a trial at the People's Court and sentenced to death. Two days later, after appeals for clemency had been turned down, they became two of the last people in Germany to be beheaded by axe, in the courtyard of Plötzensee Prison in Berlin. In 1936, Adolf Hitler decreed that future executions should be hanging or guillotine. Their executions were carried out by Carl Gröpler and were, however, not the last by axe; the last legal manual beheading in Germany is believed to be that of Olga Bancic, in 1944 during the war.

Falkenhayn's divorced husband Richard von Falkenhayn was also arrested but had to be released after no evidence of his participation could be found. His efforts to save his ex-wife from the chopping block were to no avail.
