= Scharfrichterhaus =

Historic house in Passau, Germany

Coordinates: 48°34′30″N 13°28′10″E

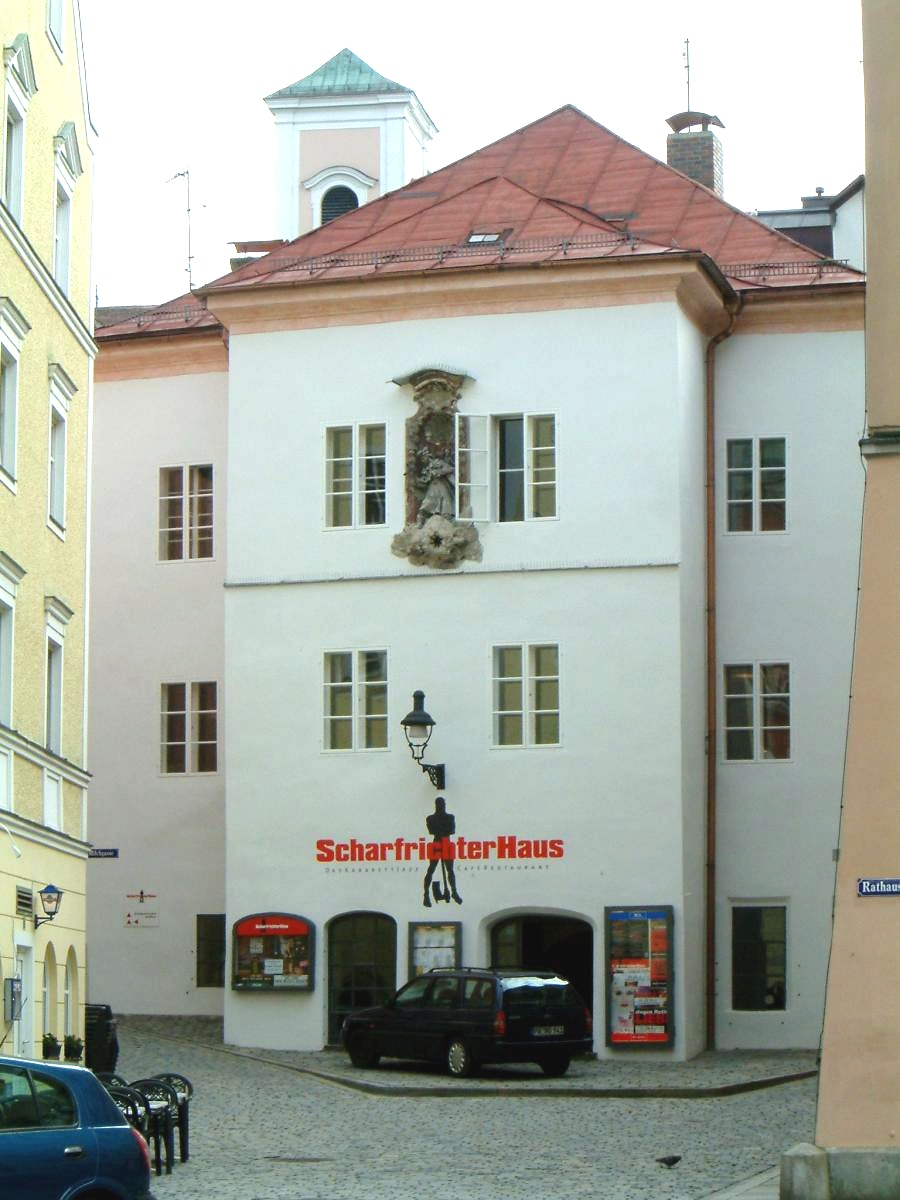
The Scharfrichterhaus

The Scharfrichterhaus (executioner’s house) in Passau, Germany, is designated as a national historical treasure and was built circa 1200. Located on "Milchgasse" ("Milk Street"), it was the official residence for the Scharfrichter (executioner) of the city of Passau. It is now a jazz and cabaret stage on which political cabaret is performed.

== History ==
Early historical documents, from the 13th century until 1443, mention the building as the feared "Prislig" prison. Around 1620, during the 30 years war, then-executioner Kaspar would distribute small slips of paper that would make the owner invulnerable. This went into the history books as "Passauerkunst" or Art of Passau.

In the 1970s, the city of Passau was under the very strong influence of the conservatives of the Christian Social Union of Bavaria, the Roman Catholic Diocese of Passau, and the Passauer press (Passauer Neue Presse, PNP). Consequently, a counter cultural movement developed and a political cabaret was formed in Passau. The main cabaret performers in this movement were Bruno Jonas and Siegfried Zimmerschied.

In opposition to this counter culture movement, the chief editor of the PNP established a news embargo on the cabaret organization. The "Generalvikar" (high Catholic Church functionary) of the diocese took the movement to the court charging blasphemy. As a result, the city of Passau imposed a ban on the cabaret’s performances.

The Scharfrichterhaus of today was founded in March 1977 by Walter Landshuter and Edgar Liegl. It has developed quickly to be an important jazz and cabaret stage on which political cabaret is performed. In 1979, the Passauer Cabaret Days was celebrated for the first time. This is a festival for art, theatre, music and cabaret. Since 1983 the Scharfrichterhaus, in collaboration with the Bavarian TV channel and a Munich newspaper, awarded the "Executioner’s Hatchet". German comedian Hape Kerkeling received this award in 1983.

The Scharfrichterhaus, a place of cultural communication, as it names itself, is even known beyond the regional and national borders. Musicians and cabaret artists offer entertainment in a special atmosphere. Events in the Scharfrichterhaus include regular performances of jazz, readings, cabaret, chanson or theatre. Due to space restrictions, some of the events take place in the nearby "Redoute Passau".

== Modern features ==
Today the Scharfrichterhaus has two main features for visitors. The first is a cafe that is part of the house and is modeled after a Viennese coffeehouse of the 19th and 20th century. The second feature is a restaurant with selected food and wine, and an additional wine-cellar.

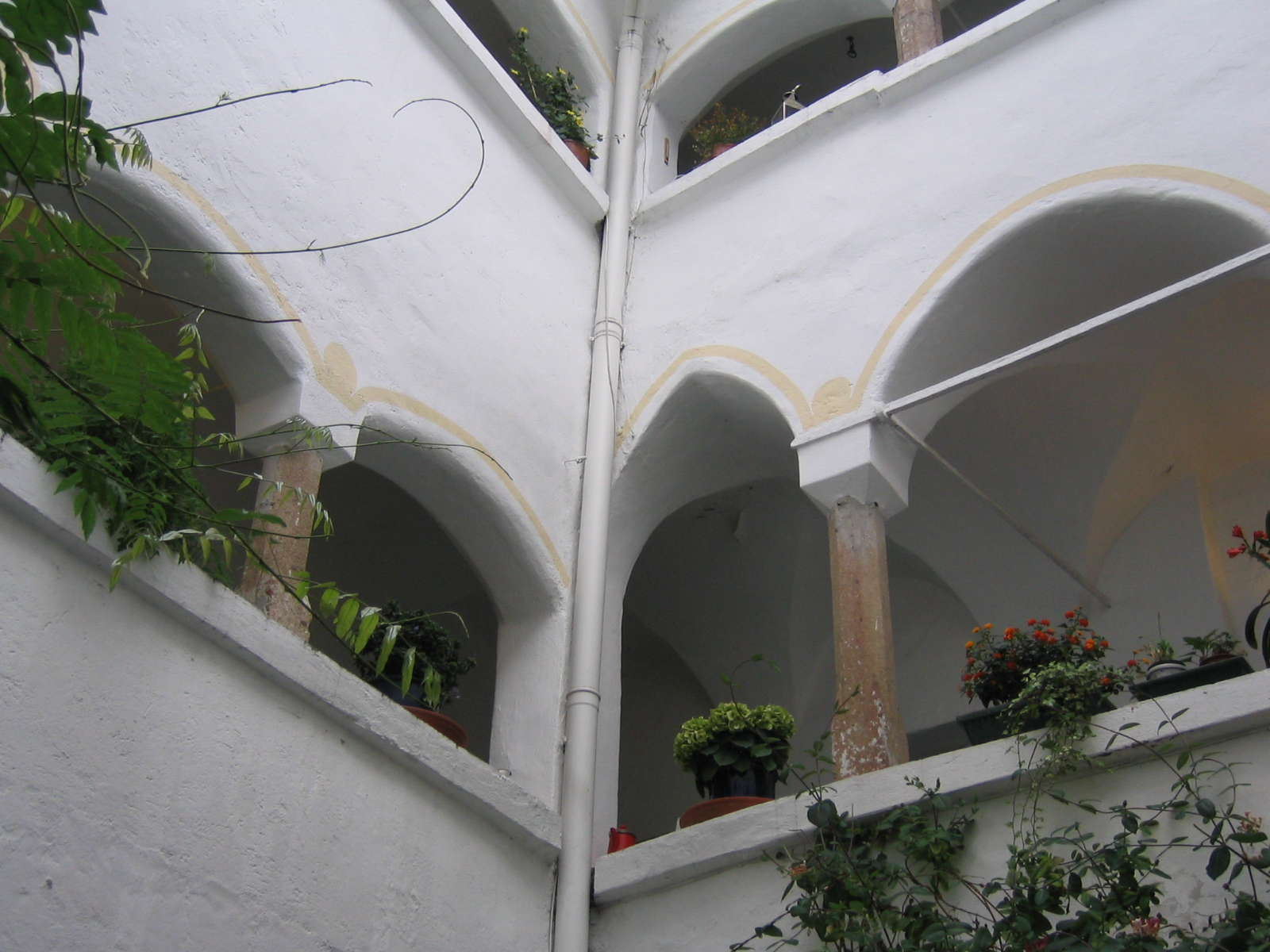
The patio of the Scharfrichterhaus

The Scharfrichterhaus also contains the independent "Scharfrichter-Cinema". The Passauer film operator Manfred Vesper has rented its rooms since 5 February 1987, based on an initiative from Walter Landshuter for a cinema, fitting to the remaining program of the Scharfrichterhaus. Those rooms had been already used for some years to present a weekly ambitious cinema, but these events had not been widely accepted by the audience.

A distinct feature of the new institution is the repertory cinema. With its detailed program the visitor knows already weeks in advance what is available. A program guide called "Trailer", the cinema's main advertising, is spread out in a circulation of 6000 copies and laid out in various shops, sent by post or email. The selection of movies, which fit into the other Scharfrichterhaus program, aims to reach viewers interested in non-mainstream movies and is primarily chosen by Vesper.

In addition, there is also a program advisory board. It consists of Landshuter and Vesper, two professors of the university of Passau, and two employees who work out together the different film rows at their regular meetings and submit them to the annual competition of the Federal Minister of the Interior for support of the cinema (German: Filmförderanstalt). Up to now every year the cinema won the prize of 5000 euro. These prizes must be used for re-investments.
