= Wilhelm Hallermann =

German lawyer, professor and Nazi

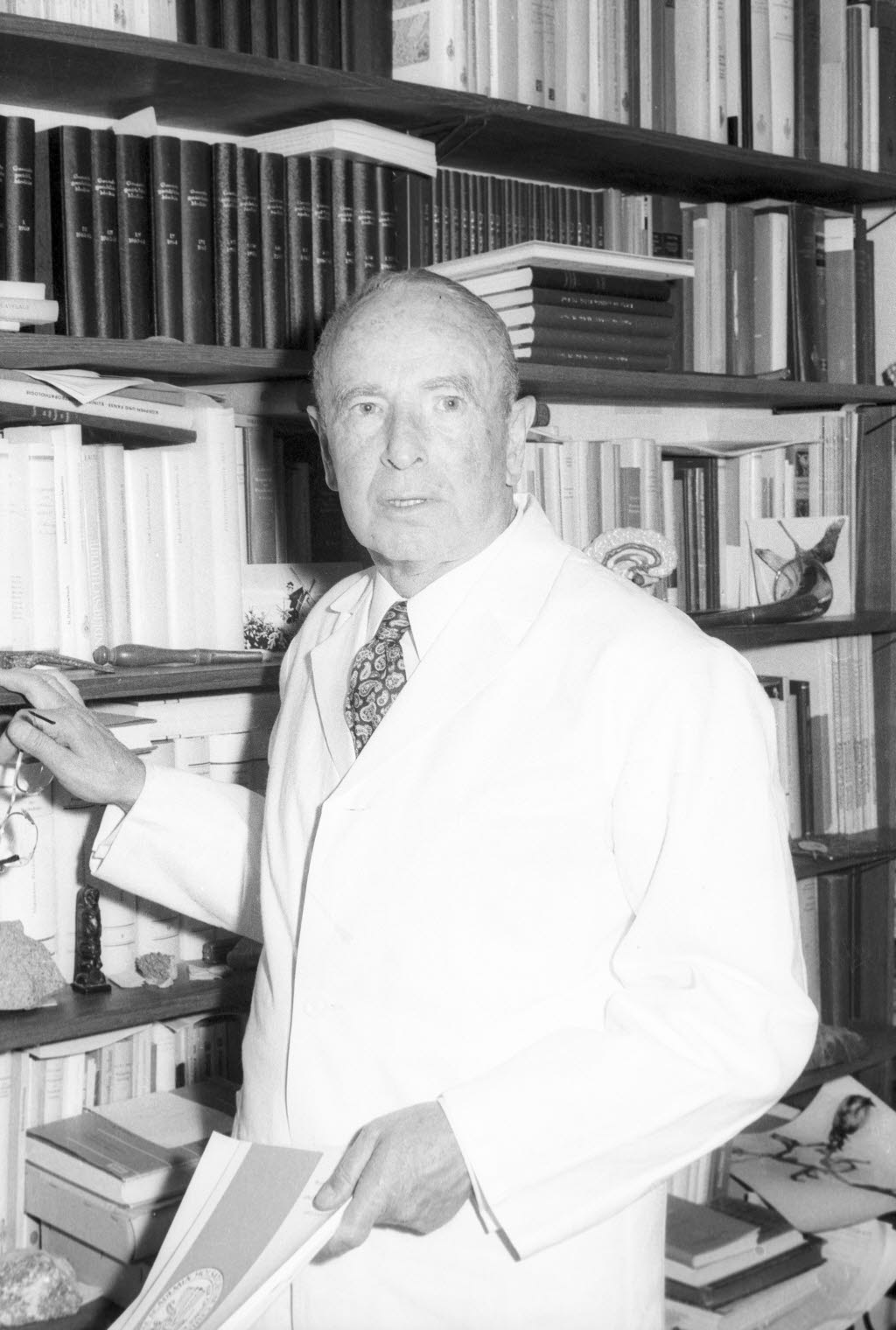
- Hallermann in 1970, photo by F. Magnussen
- Born: 14 March 1901; Arnsberg, German Empire
- Died: 28 March 1975 (aged 74); Kiel, West Germany
- Occupation: Medical jurisprudence
- Known for: Hallermann–Streiff syndrome Work at the Adolf Seefeldt case
- Honours: 'Ehrensenator' at Kiel University

Wilhelm Hallermann was a German lawyer, professor at Kiel University from 1941 until 1971, a member of the Nazi party since 1937 and a SA member since 1933.

== Education ==
Hallermann began his medical studies in 1920 at the Ludwig-Maximilians-Universität München. This was followed by study visits to the University of Göttingen, the University of Hamburg, and the University of Würzburg, where he passed his Staatsexamen (state examination) in 1925 and received his doctorate. Hallermann then worked in the pathological-anatomical department of the Dresden-Friedrichstadt city hospital as a senior physician until 1929. After a short time as an assistant and specialist in internal medicine at the Leipzig Medical University Clinic under Paul Morawitz, Hallermann worked at the Berlin Institute for Forensic Medicine of the Friedrich Wilhelm University of Berlin from 1931 to 1940. Hallermann also passed his medical examination there in 1932 and completed his habilitation in 1935 with a thesis on “Sudden cardiac death in coronary artery disease,” which was published as a monograph in 1939.

== Teaching career ==
After beginning his teaching career at the Friedrich Wilhelm University of Berlin in 1935, Hallermann represented the chair for forensic medicine at the University of Frankfurt am Main in the winter semester from 1940 to 1941 after the death of Rolf Hey, and on 1 April 1941 he was appointed director of the Institute for Forensic and Social Medicine at Kiel University, initially as an associate professor. In 1946, the professorship was converted into a full professorship, so that Hallermann was now a full public professor. From 1946 to 1969, he was in charge of the student union at Kiel University, took over the management of the German Student Union in 1956 and was dean of the Medical Faculty from 1947 to 1949. In 1969, Hallermann was honored with emeritus status and in 1971 he handed over the management of the Kiel Institute to Oskar Grüner.

== Hallermann and Nationalsocialism ==
Hallermann was a member of the National Socialist German Lecturers League and of the SA since 1933. On 17 August 1937, he applied for membership in the NSDAP and was admitted retroactively to 1 May that year (with the membership number 4.358.616). From the start of the Second World War he worked in a Military Medical Academy, and starting in 1942 he was also a consultant psychiatrist at the Oberkommando des Heeres (Army High Command) and the Kriegsmarine (The Navy of Nazi Germany).

== Adolf Seefeldt ==
In connection with the murder charge against the serial killer Adolf Seefeldt, Wilhelm Hallermann summarized that the eleven-year-old student Gustav Thomas had not been poisoned, but that, based on microscopic examinations, bloodshot pressure points on his neck would indicate strangulation.

== Bibliography ==
- Herber, Friedrich (2002). Gerichtsmedizin unterm Hakenkreuz [Forensic medicine under the swastika] (in German) (1st ed.). Leipzig: Militzke. ISBN 978-3-86189-249-6.
- Klee, Ernst (2003). Das Personenlexikon zum Dritten Reich [The personal lexicon of the Third Reich] (in German). Frankfurt am Main: S. Fischer. ISBN 978-3-10-039309-8.
