= Renate von Natzmer =

German noblewoman and spy (1898–1935)

Renate von Natzmer (1898, Borkow [Kreis Schlawe, Pomerania] – February 18, 1935, Berlin) was a German noblewoman who worked for the army during the Weimar Republic and Third Reich. She also worked for Polish intelligence. In the early 1930s, she met Polish agent Major Jerzy Sosnowski and she became, like her friend Benita von Falkenhayn, his lover. They were arrested for spying and treason. Von Falkenhayn and von Natzmer were found guilty and sentenced to death.

Two days later, after appeals for clemency had been turned down, they became two of the last people in Germany to be beheaded with an axe. Their execution was carried out by Carl Gröpler at Plötzensee Prison in Berlin. In 1938, Adolf Hitler decreed that future executions should be by hanging or the guillotine.
