= Jerzy Sosnowski =

Polish officer and spy (1896-?)

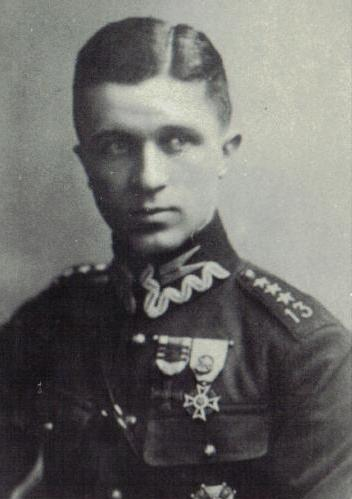
Jerzy Ksawery Franciszek Sosnowski

Jerzy Ksawery Franciszek Sosnowski (Lemberg, Austrian Galicia, 3 December 1896 – 1942, 1944, or 1945, in Poland or the Soviet Union) was a Major in Section II ("Dwójka") of the Polish General Staff and a Polish spymaster in the Weimar Republic and Nazi Germany (1926–1934), where he used the pseudonyms Georg von Nałęcz-Sosnowski and Ritter von Nalecz.

In the Soviet Union, he was known as Jurek Sosnowski, and some sources call him Stanislaw Sosnowski.

== Early days ==
Jerzy Sosnowski was born into a well-to-do family. His father was an engineer who owned a construction company in Lemberg, capital city of Galicia in the Austro-Hungarian Empire.

In August 1914 Jerzy Sosnowski joined the Polish 1st Legions Infantry Division in the Austrian army, and late in the same year he was transferred to the cavalry officers’ academy in Holice. On graduation, he was sent to the Eastern Front. Later he completed a machine-gunner course; and in March 1918, an aviation course in Wiener Neustadt's Theresian Military Academy.

After Poland regained independence in November 1918, Sosnowski joined the newly created Polish Army. He fought with distinction in the Polish–Soviet War, as a soldier of the 8th Uhlan Regiment of Prince Józef Poniatowski. Promoted to rotmistrz, he became commander of a horse squadron of the 8th Regiment. Sosnowski was an excellent horseman, taking part in international competitions in Paris and Berlin.

== Intelligence activities ==
In 1926 Sosnowski, following advice of his friend, captain Marian Chodacki, became a member of the Second Department of Polish General Staff, which was responsible for military intelligence as well as espionage activities (see: History of Polish intelligence services). After completing a course, he was sent to Berlin, becoming director of the In-3 office of Polish intelligence.

Upon arriving in German capital, Sosnowski presented himself as a Polish Baron Ritter von Nalecz, who deeply disliked Jozef Pilsudski and wanted to closely cooperate with Germany. Furthermore, he was presenting himself as a rabid anti-communist, member of a secret anti-Bolshevik military organization.

The young and handsome "Baron" quickly became popular among Berlin's social circles and started an affair with Baroness Benita von Falkenhayn, a relative of Erich von Falkenhayn, former Chief of the General Staff of the German Imperial Army. In December 1926, he talked her into cooperating with Polish intelligence, as she, owing to her connections, had a detailed knowledge of the German General Staff.

Soon afterwards, Sosnowski managed to gain services of Günther Rudloff, officer of the Abwehr's Berlin branch. Rudloff agreed to cooperate, because he had owed a significant amount of money to the Pole.

Sosnowski's quick successes raised temporary suspicion among officers of the Second Department of the General Headquarters in Warsaw. However, his next movements were even more impressive and convinced Polish headquarters of his professionalism. Agents working for the Polish spy included Irene von Jena of the Reichswehr’s headquarters (Reichswehrministerium) as well as Renate von Natzmer from the same office. As von Jena hated Poles, Sosnowski at first presented himself as a British journalist named Graves. Later, he revealed his real identity to her. Additional agents were Lotta von Lemmel and Isabelle von Tauscher, both of whom worked in the headquarters of the Reichswehr. Some of these women, including von Falkenhayn and von Natzmer, were also his lovers.

All agents supplied the Poles with very useful documentation. In 1929 Sosnowski, with help from Renate von Natzmer, acquired a copy of a war game against Poland, called Organisation Kriegsspiel. He demanded DM 40,000 for the document, but his superiors from Warsaw refused to pay so much, thinking that information provided by Sosnowski was in fact German disinformation, and Sosnowski himself had made a secret deal with von Natzmer. Ritter von Nalecz cut the price by half and finally, he sent all documents to Warsaw for free. Nevertheless, the Poles did not take advantage of these documents.

It is estimated that until 1934, the In-3 office, headed by Sosnowski and with a support base located at Polish embassy in Berlin, was the best of all foreign branches of Polish intelligence. At the same time, its activities were regarded as very expensive, costing around 2 million złotys.

== Arrest and return to Poland ==
In the autumn of 1933, the Abwehr discovered the Polish network of agents, probably due to the treachery of Lieutenant Jozef Gryf-Czajkowski, who was a double agent and who had previously held Sosnowski's post in Berlin. Also, a German actress Maria Kruse, another of Sosnowski's lovers, inadvertently helped the Abwehr with the operation.

Sosnowski was arrested by the Gestapo on February 27, 1934, during a party in an apartment at 36 Lützowufer Street. Within a few days, more people were arrested, including Benita von Falkenhayn, Renate von Natzmer, and Irene von Jena. Günther Rudloff managed to avoid arrest, as he claimed that due to cooperation with the Pole, he managed to get useful intelligence information. The Germans found out about Rudloff's activities later, and facing the death sentence, he committed suicide on July 7, 1941.

The trials began in February 1935. On 16 February, von Falkenhayn and von Natzmer were sentenced to death and later beheaded, while Sosnowski with von Jena were sentenced to life imprisonment. Sosnowski himself was shocked at the deaths of his mistresses, as he was quoted in Time, in the August 17, 1936 issue: "I am haunted by the deaths of those women. Until I was released in an exchange of prisoners I had seen no human face for 14 months. My food was lowered to me by guards from a trap door. The tragic deaths of those two—my former associates—haunt me night & day and I can only attempt to gain peace through prayer for their souls." According to some sources, Benita von Falkenhayn wanted to marry Sosnowski, and thus save her life by obtaining a Polish passport, but Adolf Hitler is said to have thwarted this attempt.

The agent was released in April 1936, when he was exchanged for three German spies, caught in Poland. As Polish headquarters had always been suspicious of Sosnowski and his astonishing successes, he was accused of fraud and high treason and put under house arrest. His trial started on March 29, 1938, in the Military District Court in Warsaw. Sosnowski denied all charges, but on June 17, 1939, he was found guilty of treason and co-operation with Germany and sentenced to 15 years as well as a fine of 200 000 złotys. He wanted to appeal against the decision, but the outbreak of World War II made it impossible .

== World War II ==
The further fate of Sosnowski is difficult to establish. According to one report, he was evacuated east from prison in early September 1939 and was shot by the prison guards on September 16 or 17 near Brzesc nad Bugiem or Jaremcze.

Another report states that Sosnowski was indeed shot but survived and later was captured by the NKVD. He was arrested on November 2, 1939, and, by order of Pavel Sudoplatov, was transported to the Lubyanka Prison, in Moscow. There, after talks with officers of Soviet intelligence, he decided to cooperate with them. He allegedly worked as an expert on Polish and German affairs, and among others, he reportedly participated in interrogations of General Mieczysław Boruta-Spiechowicz.

After the outbreak of German-Soviet War, Sosnowski, who had become an NKVD agent, taught at an espionage school in Saratov, where, in 1943, he was promoted to the rank of colonel. In the same year, he allegedly was transferred to German-occupied Poland, where he cooperated with the communist People's Army. Allegedly, in September 1944, during the Warsaw Uprising, he found himself in Warsaw, where he probably died. Ivan Serov maintained that Sosnowski was executed by the Home Army in 1944; but Pavel Sudoplatov stated in 1958 that Sosnowski was executed in 1945 by the order of Nikita Khrushchev. Some Russian sources claim that he died in 1942 in Saratov during a hunger strike.

== See also ==
- Polish contribution to WWII
- History of Polish intelligence services
- List of Poles
