= Lorenz Schwietz =

Prussian executioner (1850–1925)

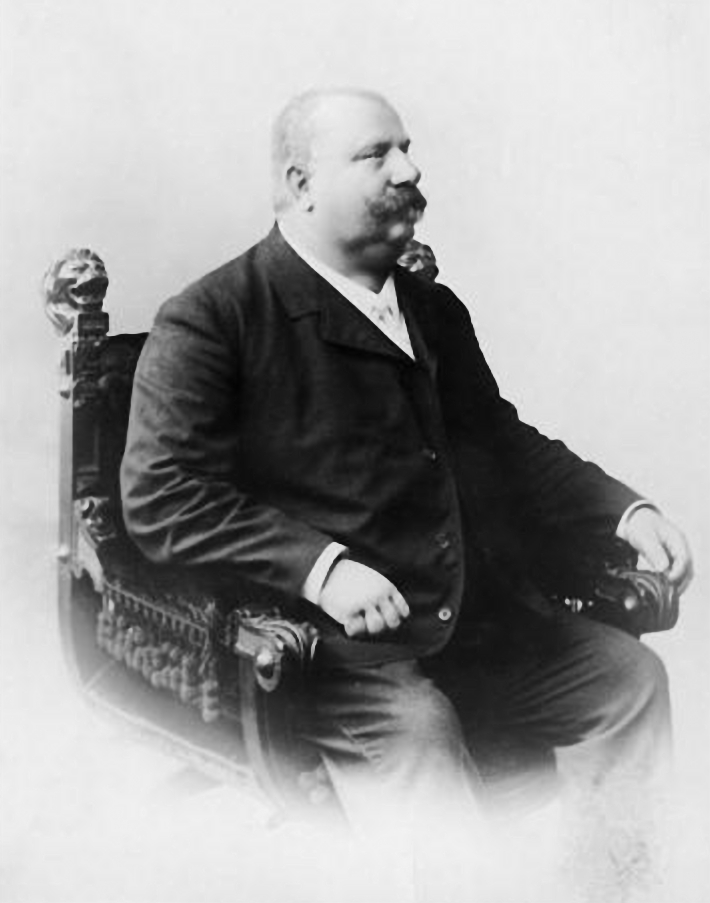
Lorenz Schwietz, about 1890

Lorenz Schwietz (25 July 1850 – May 1925, in Breslau) was Royal Prussian executioner (German: Scharfrichter) from 21 June 1900 to 29 January 1914. Responsible for carrying out capital punishment in the Prussian provinces, he executed a total of 120 to 123 people, primarily by beheading with an axe, but also with guillotines.

== Early life ==
Lorenz Schwietz was born in Groß Döbern (now Dobrzeń Wielki), Oppeln county, Prussian province of Silesia. In his early years, he worked as a butcher, first in Breslau (now Wroclaw), where he received the respective education, later in Ratibor (now Racibórz, both in Silesia), before he returned to Breslau to open a butchery. Since 1886, he ran a knacker's yard in Breslau, and in addition worked as an assistant of Royal Prussian executioner Julius Krautz.

Krautz, a knacker from Charlottenburg, resigned from the executioner's office after he had slain his assistant Gummich in April 1889 in a pub brawl, resulting from a dispute about the legitimacy of Krautz's punishments for Gummich's drunkenness at work. Schwietz was considered to take over an executioner's office by the Breslau state prosecutor, but since Schwietz had a criminal record, he was rejected. Executions in Prussia were then carried out by members of the Reindel family, a "dynasty of executioners". Friedrich Reindel retired in 1898, and Wilhelm Reindel had to resign in 1901 when, after continuous reports about his drunkenness and "feeble-minded" appearance at work, he was unable to cut off a victim's head with the first blow of his axe.

== Executioner ==
On 21 June 1900, Schwietz was examined executioner, and on 8 and 9 August, he performed his first executions. Wilhelm Reindel's son-in-law Alwin Engelhardt was also examined executioner in the same year, and claimed that he should be sole executioner in Prussia, pointing out that while he was unemployed, Schwietz had an income as a retiree. The Prussian Ministry of Justice tried to solve the rivalry by assigning to Schwietz the executions in the eastern part of Prussia, to Engelhardt the executions in the western part, divided by the Elbe river. Engelhardt soon went bankrupt, since the authorities in Hanover refused to employ him and he spent too much of his money for alcohol. In 1906, he resigned, and Schwietz was the sole executioner in Prussia.

When Schwietz was called to an execution, he brought with him three to four assistants, a red bench, an axe, a log of wood, and a black stovepipe hat. The executioner's team travelled by train, 3rd class, at the state's expense. The victim and the executioner had a first contact the evening before the execution, for the executioner to examine the victim's neck as well as their physical and mental state in case they would offer resistance. After the execution, Schwietz engraved the name of the victim into his axe, which is likely to now rest in the archives of some museum in Berlin. In an interview, Schwietz said that he felt no remorse, but perceived himself as merely executing justice on earth.

Three of Schwietz's assistants became executioners later on: Carl Gröpler, Joseph Kurz and Paul Spaethe. Spaethe succeeded Schwietz in 1914, and during World War I performed several executions under Schwietz's supervision. When Spaethe's wife died in January 1924, he shot himself dead with a revolver on 29 January 1924. Kurz was appointed his successor, but became sick and died in 1927. Gröpler, who ran a laundry in Magdeburg, was appointed executioner already when Schwietz and Spaethe were also in office, and became the foremost executioner in Nazi Germany before he died in Soviet custody in 1946.

== Death ==
Schwietz's wife had died in 1923, and the economic crisis in post-war Weimar Germany had cost him all his savings. Frustrated, he committed suicide with a gun in May 1925. The Austrian executioner Josef Lang committed suicide in the same year. The year before his death, Schwietz published his memoirs: Das Tagebuch des Scharfrichters Schwietz aus Breslau über seine 123 Hinrichtungen (Diary of executioner Schwietz from Breslau about his 123 executions), edited by Helmuth Kionka, Ruessmann: Breslau 1924.

== List of executions ==
Executions performed by Lorenz Schwietz, from 1900 to 1913 Source for the places and numbers of executions: Julius Polke, Monatsschrift für Kriminalpsychologie und Strafrechtsreform, Volume 21, Heidelberg 1930, page 275, as cited in Blazek (2010).
Place	Number of executions	Convict(s)
Glogau	6	
Breslau	3	
Brieg	1	
Berlin	3	
Neuruppin	1	
Ostrowo	2	
Oppeln	2	
Graudenz	4	All four victims were subsequently beheaded within 45 minutes in 1901
Danzig	2	
Cottbus	7	
Görlitz	2	
Tilsit	5	
Köslin	1	
Beuthen	10	
Gleiwitz	7	
Posen	7	
Allenstein	6	
Hirschberg	5	
Stargard	1	
Königsberg	4	
Schneidemühl	1	A young mother who had just delivered her baby in the death cell, in 1905
Hanover	1	
Cologne	1	
Essen	1	
Düsseldorf	2	
Schweidnitz	3	
Glatz	1	
Meseritz	3	
Öls	1	
Bartenstein	1	
Liegnitz	1	
Ratibor	6	
Bromberg	4	
Plötzensee	3	Rudolf Hennig in 1906
Guben	1	
Lessa	1	
Thorn	1	
Insterburg	5	
Stettin	1	
Frankfurt an der Oder		

== See also ==
- List of executioners
- Decapitation by executioner Schwietz 24 January 1908 in Bartenstein
- Decapitation by executioner Schwietz 27 February 1908 in Stettin
- Royal Prussian executioner Julius Krautz at de.wikipedia.org
- Royal Prussian executioner Friedrich Reindel at de.wikipedia.org

== Bibliography ==
- Appelius, Stefan (19 January 2010). "Zum Henker mit ihm!" (in German). Spiegel Online. Archived from the original on January 23, 2010.
- Blazek, Matthias (2010). "Die liebe Not der Scharfrichter" (in German). Referring to Matthias Blazek, Scharfrichter in Preußen und im Deutschen Reich 1866–1945, Stuttgart 2010.
- Blazek, Matthias (2010). Scharfrichter in Preußen und im Deutschen Reich 1866–1945. ibidem Stuttgart. ISBN 978-3-8382-0107-8.
- Evans, Richard J. (1996). Rituals of retribution. Capital punishment in Germany, 1600–1987. Oxford University Press. ISBN 0-19-821968-7.
- Førde, Tor (30 October 2008). "Dødsstraff i Tyskland 1600–1987" (in Norwegian). Referring to Evans (1996)
- Blazek, Matthias (2011): „Herr Staatsanwalt, das Urteil ist vollstreckt.“ Die Brüder Wilhelm und Friedrich Reindel: Scharfrichter im Dienste des Norddeutschen Bundes und Seiner Majestät 1843–1898. ibidem Stuttgart. ISBN 978-3-8382-0277-8.
