= Benjamin Ziemann =

German historian (born 1964)

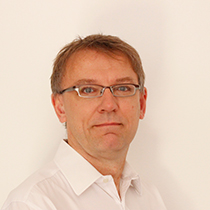
- Born: 1964 (age 61–62); Berlin, East Germany

Benjamin Ziemann (born 1964 in Berlin) is a German historian who lectures at the University of Sheffield. Since 2011, he has been Professor of Modern German History at the Department of History, University of Sheffield.

== Career ==
After working as an apprentice on a farm in Lower Saxony, Ziemann studied history and philosophy at Free University Berlin, graduating with a master's degree in 1991.

From 1992 to 1995, he was a member of the Graduate School on Social History at the University of Bielefeld, gaining his PhD in 1996. From 1996 to 2004, Ziemann worked as an assistant professor at the Institute for Social Movements at Ruhr University Bochum. In 2004–2005, he was visiting lecturer at International University Bremen (now Jacobs University Bremen). In 2005, Ziemann joined the Department of History at the University of Sheffield as a lecturer.

In 2010–2011, he was a visiting professor at the University of Tübingen (Germany). Ziemann has been a visiting scholar at the Forum for Contemporary History at Oslo University, at the University of Bielefeld and from 2013 to 2015 at Humboldt University Berlin, funded by the Gerda Henkel Foundation.

== Research ==
Ziemann's main field of expertise is German history from the 1880s to the 1980s. He has published books and articles on military history and the history of violence particularly during and after the First World War. He is also a specialist on the social and political history of the Weimar Republic. Another area of expertise is the history of religion in modern Germany, particularly during the twentieth century. In addition, Ziemann has published widely on the comparative history of pacifism and peace movements especially during the Cold War.

== Honours ==
Two of Ziemann's books have been awarded the prize Geisteswissenschaften International, a joint initiative of the German Booksellers Association, the Collecting society VG Wort and the Fritz Thyssen Foundation to facilitate the translation of German academic books into foreign languages.

In 2000, Ziemann was awarded the Bennigsen-Foerder Prize by the Ministry of School, Continuing Education and Science in the state of North Rhine-Westphalia. He used the prize money of 100.000 Deutsche Mark to conduct a research project on the impact of opinion -polling on the political system in the Federal Republic from 1949 to 1990.

In 2003, Ziemann was the recipient of a Feodor Lynen Fellowship by the Alexander von Humboldt Foundation, allowing him to spend the academic year 2003–2004 as a visiting scholar at the University of York (UK).

In 2007, Ziemann was elected as a Fellow of the Royal Historical Society.

== Selected publications ==
=== Books ===
- Hitler's Personal Prisoner. The Life of Martin Niemöller, Oxford: Oxford University Press, 2024 ISBN 9780192862587
- Violence and the German Soldier in the Great War: Killing-Dying-Surviving, London: Bloomsbury Academic, 2017 ISBN 9781350106116
- Gewalt im Ersten Weltkrieg. Töten – Überleben – Verweigern, Essen: Klartext, 2013.
- Veteranen der Republik. Kriegserinnerung und demokratische Politik 1918–1933, Bonn: J.H.W.Dietz Nachf., 2014.
- Contested Commemorations: Republican War Veterans and Weimar Political Culture, Cambridge: Cambridge University Press, 2013. ISBN 9781107028890
- Sozialgeschichte der Religion. Von der Reformation bis zur Gegenwart, Frankfurt/Main: Campus, 2009.
- Encounters with Modernity: The Catholic Church in West Germany, 1945–1975, New York. Oxford: Berghahn Books, 2014.
- Katholische Kirche und Sozialwissenschaften 1945–1975, Göttingen: Vandenhoeck & Ruprecht, 2007
- War Experiences in Rural Germany, 1914–1923, Oxford; New York: Berg, 2007. ISBN 1845202457
- Front und Heimat. Ländliche Kriegserfahrungen im südlichen Bayern 1914–1923, Essen: Klartext, 1997

=== Edited collections ===
- (with Nadine Rossol), The Oxford Handbook of the Weimar Republic, Oxford: Oxford University Press, 2022 ISBN 9780198845775
- (with Kerstin Brückweh/Dirk Schumann/Richard Wetzell), Engineering Society. The Role of the Human and Social Sciences in Modern Societies, 1880–1980, Basingstoke: Palgrave
- (with Bernd Ulrich), The German Soldiers of the Great War. Letters and Eyewitness Accounts, Barnsley: Pen & Sword, 2010.
- (with Miriam Dobson), Reading Primary Sources. The Interpretation of Texts from Nineteenth- and Twentieth-Century History, London: Routledge, 2008.
- (with Thomas Mergel), European Political History 1870–1913, Aldershot: Ashgate 2007.
- Peace Movements in Western Europe, Japan and the USA during the Cold War, Essen: Klartext 2007.
- Perspektiven der Historischen Friedensforschung, Essen: Klartext 2002
- (with Bernd Ulrich and Jakob Vogel), Untertan in Uniform. Militär und Militarismus im Kaiserreich 1871–1914, Frankfurt/Main: Fischer Taschenbuch Verlag 2001
- (with Thomas Kühne), Was ist Militärgeschichte?, Paderborn: Schöningh 2000
- (with Bernd Ulrich), Krieg im Frieden. Die umkämpfte Erinnerung an den Ersten Weltkrieg, Frankfurt/Main: Fischer Taschenbuch Verlag 1997

== Open Access Publications ==
Full list of open access articles by Benjamin Ziemann
