= Fritz Haarmann =

German serial killer (1879–1925)

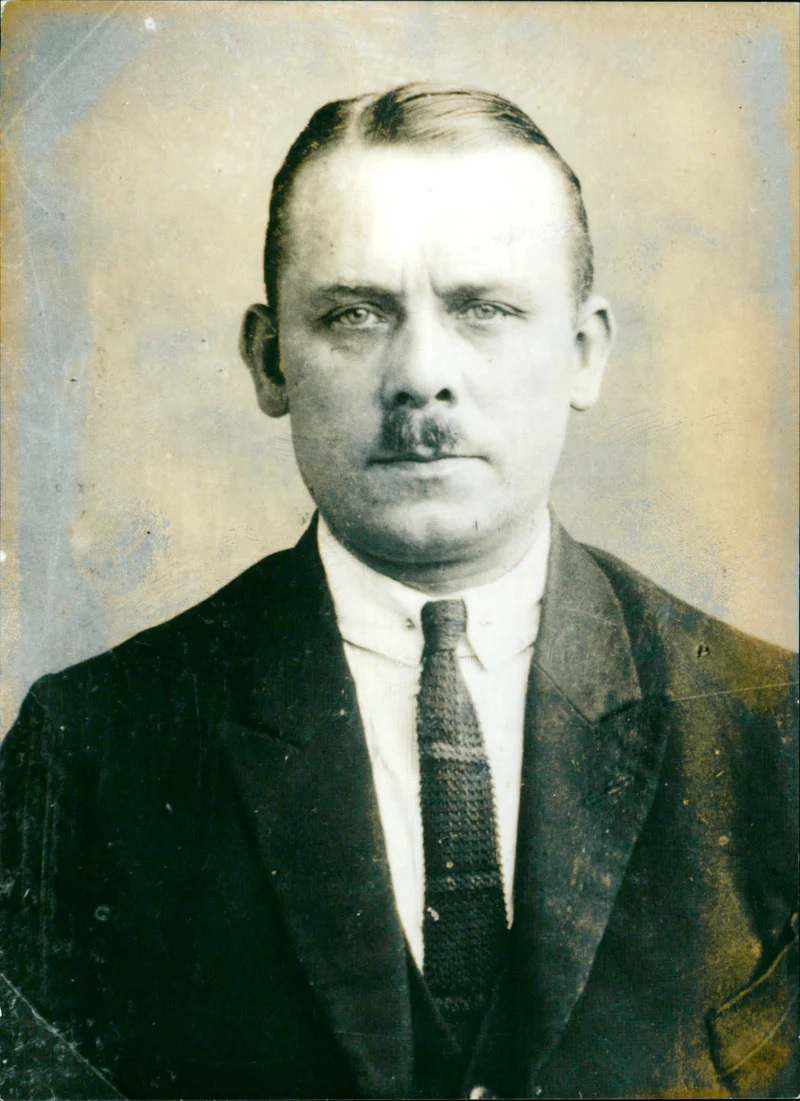
- Haarmann, c. 1924
- Born: Friedrich Heinrich Karl Haarmann; 25 October 1879; Hanover, German Empire
- Died: 15 April 1925 (aged 45); Hanover Prison, Weimar Republic
- Other names: The Butcher of Hanover; The Wolf Man; The Vampire of Hanover; The Wholesale Murderer
- Status: Executed by guillotine
- Conviction: Murder (24 counts)
- Penalty: Death

Details
- Victims: 24–27+
- Span of crimes: 25 September 1918 – 14 June 1924
- Country: Germany
- States: Province of Hanover, Prussia
- Date apprehended: 22 June 1924

Friedrich Heinrich Karl "Fritz" Haarmann (25 October 1879 – 15 April 1925) was a German serial rapist and serial killer, known as the Butcher of Hanover, the Vampire of Hanover and the Wolf Man, who committed the sexual assault, murder, mutilation and dismemberment of at least twenty-four young men and boys in the city of Hanover between 1918 and 1924.

Found guilty of twenty-four of the twenty-seven murders for which he was tried, Haarmann was sentenced to death by beheading in December 1924. He was subsequently executed by guillotine in April 1925.

Haarmann became known as the Butcher of Hanover (German: Der Schlächter von Hannover) due to the extensive mutilation and dismemberment committed upon his victims' bodies, and by such titles as the Vampire of Hanover (der Vampir von Hannover) and the Wolf Man (Wolfsmensch) because of his preferred murder method of biting into or through his victims' throats.

== Early life ==
=== Childhood ===
Fritz Haarmann was born in Hanover on 25 October 1879, the sixth and youngest child born to Johanna (née Claudius) and Ollie Haarmann.

Haarmann was a quiet child, with few friends his own age or gender, and who seldom socialized with any children outside of school, with the exception of his siblings. From an early age, Haarmann's behaviour was noticeably effeminate, and he was known to shun boys' activities, instead playing with his sisters' dolls and dressing in their clothes. He also developed a passion for both needlework and cookery, and would develop a close relationship with his mother, who spoiled her youngest child. (Note: From his early childhood Fritz developed a bitter hatred and rivalry towards his father, which would continue until his father's death in 1921.)

Reportedly, Haarmann's father married his mother when she was 41 years old and seven years his senior, largely due to her wealth and the substantial dowry their marriage would eventually bring him. Haarmann Sr. was known to be argumentative and short-tempered and conducted several affairs throughout his marriage. Via his infidelity, he contracted syphilis in his later years. Despite his father being an authoritarian who had little time for his children and a notorious womanizer, Haarmann's parents remained together until his mother's death in April 1901.

In 1886, Haarmann began his schooling; he was noted by teachers to be a spoiled and mollycoddled child who was prone to daydreaming. Although his behaviour at school was noted to be exemplary, his academic performance was below average, and Haarmann had to repeat a school year twice. On one occasion, when he was about eight years old, Haarmann was molested by one of his teachers, although he never discussed this incident in detail.

Haarmann grew into a trim, physically strong youth. With his parents' consent, he finished his schooling in 1894. Upon leaving school, Haarmann briefly obtained employment as an apprentice locksmith in Neuf-Brisach (now part of France) before opting at age 15 to enrol in a military academy in the town of Breisach. His military training began on 4 April 1895.

=== Adolescence and first offences ===
Haarmann initially adapted to military life and performed well as a trainee soldier. However, after five months of military service, he began to suffer periodic lapses of consciousness which, although initially described by a medical professional as being sudden signs of anxiety neurosis, were subsequently diagnosed as being "equivalent to epilepsy" in October 1895. The following month, Haarmann discharged himself from the military and returned to Hanover, where he briefly worked in a cigar factory his father had established in 1888.

At age 16, Haarmann committed his first known sexual offences, all of which involved young boys whom he would lure to secluded areas—typically cellars—before proceeding to sexually abuse them. He was first arrested for committing offences of this nature in July 1896. Following further offences, the Division for Criminal Matters opted to place Haarmann in a mental institution in the city of Hildesheim in February 1897. Although briefly transferred to a Hanover hospital for psychiatric evaluation, he would be certified as being "incurably deranged" and unfit to stand trial by a psychologist named Gurt Schmalfuß. Schmalfuß ordered Haarmann to be confined at the mental institution indefinitely. He was returned to the institution on 28 May 1897.

Seven months later, in January 1898, Haarmann escaped the mental institution and, with apparent assistance from his mother, fled to Zürich in Switzerland. Here, he lived with a relative of his mother and obtained employment as a handyman in a shipyard. Haarmann remained in Zürich for sixteen months before he returned to Hanover in April 1899. Early the following year, he seduced and subsequently became engaged to a woman named Erna Loewert, who soon became pregnant with his child. (Note: Haarmann's fiancée would later arrange for this first pregnancy to be aborted.) In October 1900, Haarmann received notification to perform his compulsory military service.

== Military service ==
On 12 October 1900, Haarmann was deployed to the Alsatian city of Colmar to serve in the Number 10 Rifle Battalion. Throughout his service, he earned a reputation among his superiors as an exemplary soldier and excellent marksman, and he would later describe this period of service as being the happiest of his entire life. After collapsing while on exercise with his battalion in October 1901, Haarmann began to suffer dizzy spells and was subsequently hospitalized for over four months. He was later deemed "unsuitable for [military] service and work" and was discharged on 28 July 1902.

Discharged from the military under medical terms described as being "probable" dementia praecox, Haarmann was awarded a monthly pension of twenty-one gold marks. (Note: Haarmann would continue to receive his military pension until his 1924 arrest for murder.) He returned to live with Erna in Hanover, briefly working again in his father's cigar factory. However, he soon filed a maintenance lawsuit against his father, citing that he was unable to work due to the ailments noted by the military. Haarmann's father successfully contested the suit, and the charges were dropped. The following year, a violent fight between father and son resulted in Haarmann's father himself unsuccessfully initiating legal proceedings against his son, citing verbal death threats and blackmail as justification to have his son returned to a mental institution. These charges were dropped due to a lack of corroborating evidence. Nonetheless, Haarmann was ordered to undertake a psychiatric examination in May 1903. This examination was conducted by a Dr. Andrae, who concluded that, although morally inferior, Haarmann was not mentally unstable.

With financial assistance from his father, Haarmann and his fiancée opened a fishmongery. Haarmann himself briefly attempted to work as an insurance salesman before being officially classified as disabled and unable to work by the 10th Army in 1904. As a result, his monthly pension was slightly increased. The same year, his fiancée, while pregnant with his child, terminated their engagement after he accused her of having an affair with a student. As the fishmongery was registered in her name, Erna simply ordered her fiancé to leave the premises.

== Criminal career ==
For the next decade, Haarmann primarily lived as a petty thief, burglar, and con artist. Although he did occasionally obtain legitimate employment, he invariably stole from his employers or their customers. Beginning in 1905, he served several short prison sentences for offences such as larceny, embezzlement, and assault. On one occasion when working legitimately as an invoice clerk, Haarmann became acquainted with a female employee with whom he later claimed to have robbed several tombstones and graves between 1905 and 1913 (he was never charged with these offences). Consequently, Haarmann spent the majority of the years between 1905 and 1912 in jail.

In late 1913, Haarmann was arrested for burglary. A search of his home revealed a hoard of stolen property linking him to several other burglaries. Despite protesting his innocence, Haarmann was charged with and convicted of a series of burglaries and frauds. He was sentenced to five years' imprisonment for these offences.

Due to compulsory conscription resulting from the outbreak of World War I, Germany saw a shortage of available domestic manpower. In the final years of his prison sentence, Haarmann was permitted to work throughout the day on the grounds of various manor houses near the town of Rendsburg, with instructions to return to prison each evening. Upon his release from prison in April 1918, he initially moved to Berlin before opting to return to Hanover, where he briefly lived with one of his sisters before renting a single-room apartment in late August 1918.

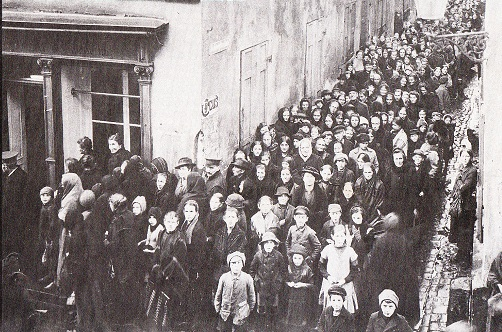
The years following the loss of World War I saw an increase in poverty, crime, and black market trading in the Weimar Republic.

According to Haarmann, he was struck by the poverty of the German nation as a result of the loss the nation had suffered in World War I. Through his initial efforts to both trade and purchase stolen property at Hanover Central Station, Haarmann established several criminal contacts with whom he could trade in contraband property, and he immediately reverted to the criminal life he had lived before his 1913 arrest.

=== Police informant ===
Despite police knowledge that Haarmann was both a known criminal and a known homosexual, (Note: Homosexuality was illegal and punishable by imprisonment in the German Empire and the Weimar Republic.) he gradually began to establish a relationship with law enforcement as an informer, largely as a means of redirecting the attention of the police from himself and his own criminal activities, and to facilitate his access to young males. By 1919, Haarmann is known to have regularly patrolled Hanover station, and to have provided police with information relating to the city's extensive criminal network. With the cooperation of several police officials, Haarmann devised a ruse whereby he would offer to fence or store stolen property at his premises, then pass this information to police, who would then raid his property at agreed times and arrest these contacts. To remove any suspicion as to his treachery reaching the criminal fraternity, Haarmann himself would be arrested in these raids. Moreover, on numerous occasions, he is known to have performed citizen's arrests upon commuters for offences such as travelling on forged documents. As a result of these activities, police began to rely on Haarmann as a reliable source of information regarding various criminal activities in Hanover, and he was allowed to patrol Hanover station largely at will.

== Known and alleged murders ==
Between 1918 and 1924, Haarmann committed at least twenty-four murders, although he is suspected of murdering a minimum of twenty-seven. All of his victims were males between the ages of 10 and 22, the majority of whom were in their mid- to late-teens. The victims were lured back to one of three addresses in which Haarmann is known to have resided throughout those years. He is known to have killed upon the promise of assistance, accommodation, work, or under the pretence of arrest. At Haarmann's apartment, the victim was typically given food and drink before Haarmann bit into his Adam's apple, often as he was strangled. Often this caused the victim to die of asphyxiation, but on several occasions Haarmann bit completely through his victims' Adams apple and trachea. (Haarmann referred to the act of biting through his victims' neck as his "love bite".)

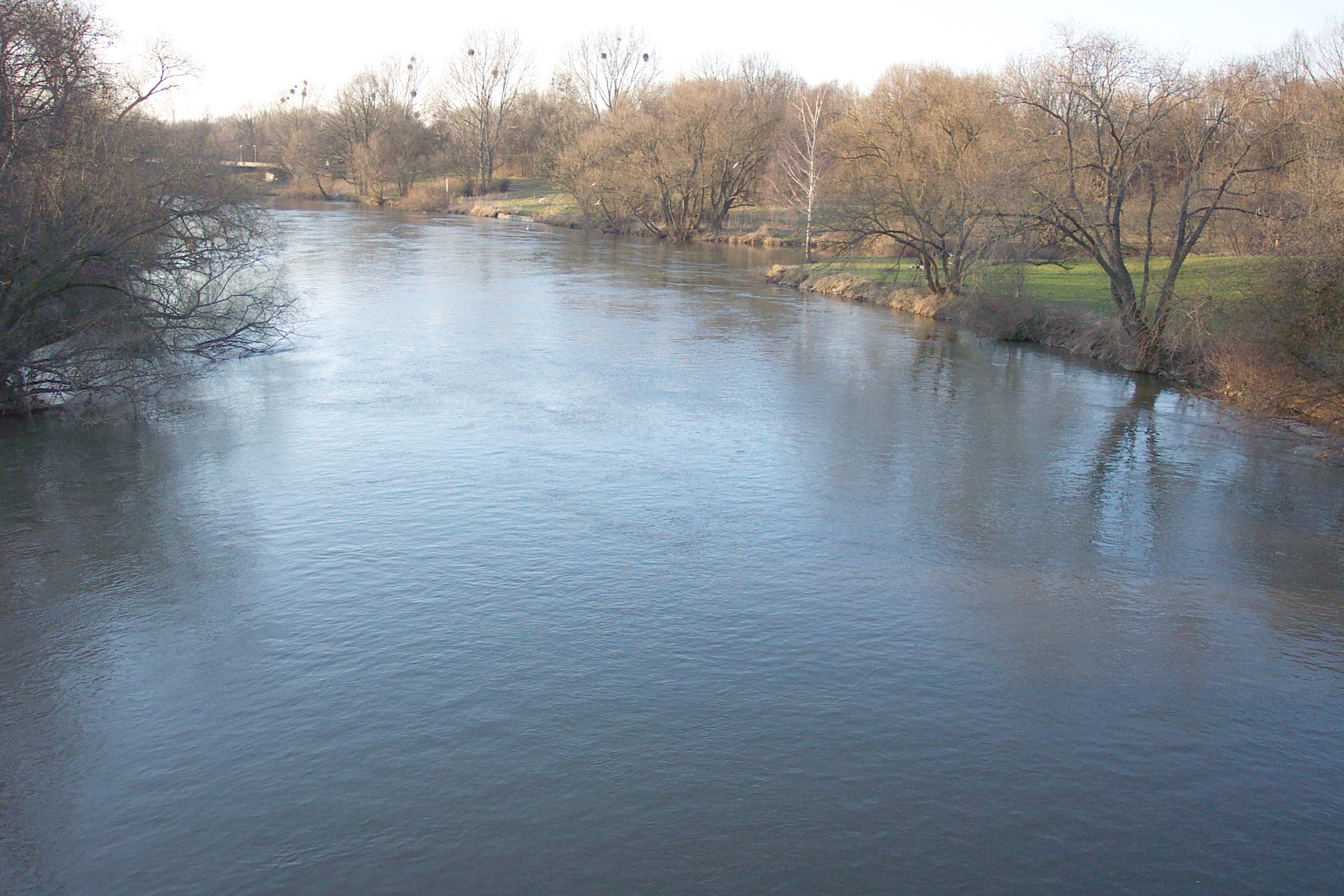
The Leine River, into which Haarmann disposed of many of his victims' dismembered remains

All of Haarmann's known victims were dismembered before their bodies were discarded, usually in the Leine River, although the dismembered body of his first known victim had simply been buried, and the body of his last victim had been thrown into a lake located at the entrance to the Herrenhausen Gardens.

Haarmann typically kept his victims' personal possessions for himself or his lover, Hans Grans. Alternatively, they would either be sold on the black market through criminal contacts he and Grans had established at Hanover Central Station or sold to legitimate retailers. In several instances, both Haarmann and Grans gave possessions belonging to various victims to acquaintances as gifts.

Following Haarmann's arrest, rumours circulated that Haarmann ate the flesh of his victims, or sold it on the black market as pork or horse meat. Although no evidence was ever produced to confirm these theories, Haarmann was known to be an active trader in contraband meat, which was invariably boneless, diced, and often sold as ground meat. When asked where he obtained the meat, Haarmann sometimes said he had obtained the produce from a butcher named "Karl", although investigators would later note that the stories Haarmann told his acquaintances regarding the origins of this individual varied.

=== First known victim ===
Haarmann's first known victim was a 17-year-old runaway named Friedel Rothe. When Rothe disappeared on 25 September 1918, his friends told police he was last seen with Haarmann, who at the time resided in a single-room apartment at 27 Cellerstraße. Under pressure from Rothe's family, police raided Haarmann's apartment in October 1918, where they found Haarmann in the company of a semi-naked 13-year-old boy. He was charged with both the sexual assault and battery of a minor, and sentenced to nine months' imprisonment. (Haarmann later confessed to detectives that at the time they had searched his apartment, Rothe's head was stowed behind his stove, wrapped in newspaper.)

Haarmann avoided serving his sentence throughout 1919. That October, he met an 18-year-old youth named Hans Grans, who had run away from his home in Berlin following an argument with his father on 1 October. Grans had slept rough in and around Hanover station for approximately two weeks—selling old clothes in and around the station to earn enough money to simply eat—before he encountered Haarmann.

=== Relationship with Hans Grans ===
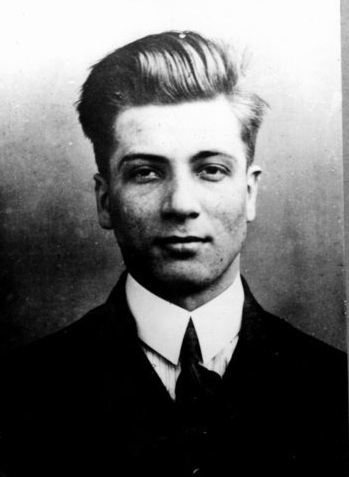
Hans Grans

In his subsequent confessions to police, Grans stated that despite being heterosexual, he had initiated contact with Haarmann with the intention of prostituting himself, having heard of Haarmann's homosexuality through acquaintances he had established in Hanover. Haarmann himself stated following his arrest that he viewed Grans as being "like a son" to him, adding that he "pulled him [Grans] out of the ditch and tried to make sure he didn't go to the dogs."

Shortly after their initial acquaintance, Haarmann invited the youth to move into his apartment, and Grans became Haarmann's lover and criminal accomplice. According to Haarmann, although he was smitten with Grans, he gradually became aware that the youth manipulated and, occasionally, mocked him. On several occasions, Grans was evicted after heated arguments, only for Haarmann to plead with him to come back. Despite the manipulation Haarmann endured at the hands of his accomplice, he later claimed to tolerate the capitulation as he craved Grans' companionship and affection, adding: "I had to have someone I meant everything to."

Haarmann served the nine-month prison sentence imposed in 1918 for sexual assault and battery between March and December 1920. Upon his release, he again regained the trust of the police and again became an informer. Haarmann initially resided in a hotel, before he and Grans lodged with a middle-class family.

Through criminal contacts, Haarmann became aware of a vacant ground-floor apartment located at 8 Neue Straße. The apartment was located in a densely populated, old house located alongside the Leine River. Haarmann secured a letting agreement with the landlady, ostensibly to use the property for storage purposes. He and Grans moved into 8 Neue Straße on 1 July 1921.

== Subsequent murders ==
=== 1923 ===
Haarmann's subsequent victims largely consisted of young male commuters, runaways, and, occasionally, male prostitutes, whom he would typically encounter in or around Hanover's central railway station. The second murder Haarmann is known to have committed occurred on 12 February 1923. The victim was a 17-year-old pianist named Fritz Franke, whom Haarmann encountered at Hanover Central Station and invited to his Neue Straße residence, where he introduced the youth to Hans Grans and two female acquaintances (one of whom was Grans' female lover). According to Grans' lover, that evening, Grans whispered in her ear: "Hey! He's going to be trampled on today." The following day, both these acquaintances returned to Haarmann's apartment, where they were informed by Haarmann that Franke had travelled to Hamburg. Speculation remains as to Grans' knowledge of Haarmann's intentions towards Franke when he made this comment to the two female acquaintances. According to Haarmann, following this murder, Grans arrived unannounced at his apartment, where he observed Franke's nude body lying upon Haarmann's bed. Grans had then simply looked at him and asked, "When shall I come back again?"

Five weeks after the murder of Franke, on 20 March, Haarmann encountered a 17-year-old commuter named Wilhelm Schulze at Hanover station. Schulze had been travelling to work when he encountered Haarmann. No human remains identified as belonging to Schulze were ever found, although most of his clothing was in the possession of Haarmann's landlady, Elisabeth Engel, at the time of his arrest. Two more victims are known to have been murdered at 8 Neue Straße before Haarmann vacated the apartment in June: 16-year-old Roland Huch, who disappeared on 23 May after informing a close friend he intended to run away from home and join the Marines; and 19-year-old Hans Sonnenfeld, who disappeared on or about 31 May and whose distinctive yellow overcoat Haarmann is known to have worn after the youth's murder.

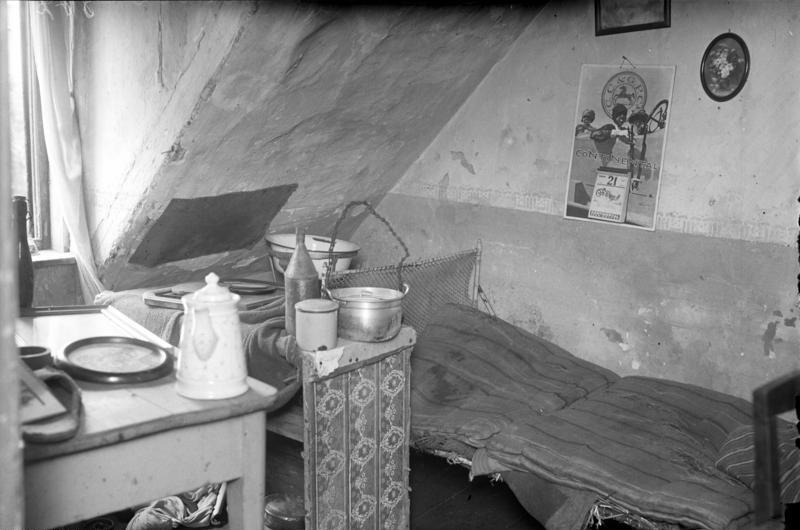
Police photo of Haarmann's attic room at 2 Rote Reihe, Hanover

On 9 June 1923, Haarmann moved into a single-room attic apartment at 2 Rote Reihe. Two weeks after moving into this address, on 25 June, Ernst Ehrenberg, the 13-year-old son of Haarmann's neighbour, disappeared while running an errand for his father. His school cap and braces would be found in Haarmann's apartment following his arrest. Two months later, on 24 August, an 18-year-old office clerk named Heinrich Struß was reported missing by his aunt (with whom he lived). Many of Struß's belongings would also be found in Haarmann's apartment. Struß's murder would be followed one month later by the murder of a 17-year-old named Paul Bronischewski, who disappeared en route to the city of Bochum, having worked with his uncle in Saxony-Anhalt throughout the summer. Subsequent police enquiries suggested Bronischewski had likely alighted the train at Hanover, where he evidently encountered Haarmann. Bronischewski's jacket, knapsack, trousers, and towel would all be found in the possession of Haarmann following his arrest.

Haarmann is next known to have killed on or about 30 September 1923. The victim was 17-year-old Richard Gräf, who last informed his family he had met an individual at Hanover station who "knows of a good job for me." Two weeks later, on 12 October, a 16-year-old Gehrden youth named Wilhelm Erdner failed to return home from work. Subsequent enquiries by Erdner's parents revealed the youth became acquainted with a "Detective Fritz Honnerbrock" (a pseudonym used by Haarmann) shortly before his disappearance. Both Haarmann and Grans subsequently sold Erdner's bicycle on 20 October. Within a week of having sold this bicycle, Haarmann killed two further victims: 15-year-old Hermann Wolf, who disappeared from Hanover station on 24 October, and 13-year-old Heinz Brinkmann, who was seen by a witness standing in the entrance to Hanover station at 11:00 p.m. on 27 October, having missed his train home to the town of Clausthal. (Note: Haarmann would deny having killed Hermann Wolf at his trial, and was acquitted of this murder.)

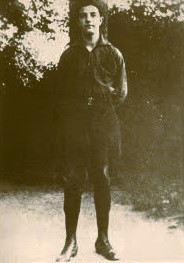
Adolf Hannappel

On 10 November 1923, a 17-year-old apprentice carpenter from the city of Düsseldorf named Adolf Hannappel disappeared from Hanover station. He was seen by several witnesses sitting upon a trunk in the waiting room. These witnesses also positively identified Hans Grans—in the company of Haarmann—pointing towards the youth, who shortly thereafter was observed walking towards a café in the company of these two men. One month later, on 6 December, 19-year-old Adolf Hennies disappeared. He had been seeking employment at the time of his disappearance. None of the human remains recovered were identified as belonging to Hennies, whom Haarmann specifically admitted to dismembering, but denied killing. In subsequent court testimony vehemently disputed by Grans, Haarmann claimed he returned home to find Hennies's body—missing his signature "love bite"—lying naked on his bed, with Grans and another criminal acquaintance named Hugo Wittkowski stating the youth was, "One of yours." (Neither Haarmann nor Grans were convicted of Hennies's murder due to conflicting testimony.)

=== 1924 ===
The first victim killed by Haarmann in 1924 was 17-year-old Ernst Spiecker, who disappeared on 5 January. Although subsequent trial testimony from a friend of Spiecker indicated Haarmann had become acquainted with this youth before his murder, Haarmann stated he would simply have to "assume" this youth was one of his victims due to all his personal possessions being found in his or Grans' possession following his arrest. Ten days later, Haarmann killed a 20-year-old named Heinrich Koch, whom he is also believed to have been acquainted with prior to the youth's murder. The following month, Haarmann is known to have killed two further victims: 19-year-old Willi Senger, who disappeared from the suburb of Linden-Limmer on 2 February, having informed his sister he was to travel with a friend; and 16-year-old Hermann Speichert, who was last seen by his sister on 8 February.

Haarmann is not known to have killed again until on or about 1 April, when he is believed to have killed an acquaintance named Hermann Bock. Although cleared of this murder at his trial, Haarmann possessed Bock's clothing when arrested, and he is known to have given the youth's suitcase to his landlady; moreover, Haarmann is known to have actively dissuaded several of Bock's acquaintances from reporting the youth missing. One week later, on 8 April, 16-year-old Alfred Hogrefe disappeared from Hanover station, having run away from home in the town of Lehrte on 2 April. Hogrefe's murder would be followed 9 days later by that of a 16-year-old apprentice named Wilhelm Apel, whom Haarmann encountered on his "patrols" of Hanover-Leinhausen station.

On 26 April, 18-year-old Robert Witzel disappeared after borrowing 50 pfennigs from his mother, explaining he intended to visit a travelling circus. Enquiries by the youth's parents revealed their son had accompanied an "official from the railway station" to the circus. Haarmann himself would later state he killed Witzel the same evening and, having dismembered the youth's body, had thrown the remains into the Leine River.

Two weeks after the murder of Witzel, Haarmann killed a 14-year-old named Heinz Martin, who was last seen by his mother on 9 May and who is believed to have been abducted from Hanover station. All his clothing was later found in Haarmann's apartment. Less than three weeks later, on 26 May, a 17-year-old travelling salesman from the town of Kassel named Fritz Wittig, whom Haarmann would later state he killed upon the insistence of Grans as he had worn a "good new suit" Grans coveted, was dismembered and discarded in the Leine River. The same day Wittig is believed to have been killed, Haarmann killed his youngest known victim, 10-year-old Friedrich Abeling, who disappeared while truant from school. His murder would be followed less than two weeks later by that of 16-year-old Friedrich Koch, who was approached by Haarmann on 5 June as he walked to college. Two acquaintances of Koch would later testify at Haarmann's trial that, as they walked with Koch to college, Haarmann approached Koch, tapped the youth on the boot with his walking stick and stated: "Well, boy, don't you recognize me?"

Haarmann killed his final victim, 17-year-old Erich de Vries, on 14 June 1924. De Vries encountered Haarmann at Hanover station. His dismembered body would later be found in a lake located near the entrance to the Herrenhausen Gardens. Haarmann would confess it had taken him four separate trips to carry de Vries's dismembered remains—carried in the leather bag which had belonged to Friedrich Koch—to the location where he had disposed of them.

== Discoveries ==
On 17 May 1924, two children playing near the Leine River discovered a human skull. Determined to be that of a young male aged between 18 and 20 and bearing evidence of knife wounds, police were sceptical as to whether a murder had been committed or whether the skull had either been discarded in this location by grave robbers, or placed there in a tasteless prank by medical students. Furthermore, police theorized the skull may have been discarded in the river at Alfeld, which had recently experienced an outbreak of typhoid. Two weeks later, on 29 May, a second skull was found behind a mill race located close to the scene of the earlier discovery. This skull was also identified as having been that of a young male aged between 18 and 20. Shortly thereafter, two boys playing in a field close to the village of Döhren discovered a sack containing numerous human bones.

Two more skulls would be found on 13 June: one upon the banks of the Leine River, and another located close to a mill in western Hanover. Each of the skulls had been removed from the vertebrae with a sharp instrument. One skull belonged to a male in his late teens, whereas the other belonged to a boy estimated to have been aged between 11 and 13 years old. In addition, one of these skulls also bore evidence of having been scalped.

For more than a year prior to these discoveries, rumours had circulated in Hanover about the fate of the sheer number of children and teenagers who had been reported missing in the city. The discoveries sparked fresh rumours regarding missing and murdered children. In addition, various newspapers responded to these discoveries and the resulting rumours by harking to the disproportionate number of young people who had been reported missing in Hanover between 1918 and 1924. (Note: In 1923 alone, almost 600 teenage boys and young men had been reported missing in Hanover.)

On 8 June, several hundred Hanover residents converged close to the Leine River and searched both the banks of the river and the surrounding areas, discovering a number of human bones, which were handed to the police. In response to these latest discoveries, police decided to drag the entire section of the river which ran through the centre of the city. In doing so, they discovered more than 500 further human bones and sections of bodies, many bearing knife striations, which were later confirmed by a court doctor as having belonged to at least 22 separate human individuals. Approximately half of the remains had been in the river for some time, whereas other bones and body parts had been discarded in the river more recently. Many of the recent and aged discoveries bore evidence of having been dissected—particularly at the joints. Over 30 per cent of the remains were judged to have belonged to young males aged between 15 and 20.

Suspicion for the discoveries quickly fell upon Haarmann, who was known to both the police and the criminal investigation department as a homosexual who had amassed fifteen previous convictions dating from 1896 for various offences including child molestation and the sexual assault and battery of a minor. Moreover, he had been connected to the 1918 disappearances of Friedel Rothe and a 14-year-old named Hermann Koch (who had disappeared weeks prior to Rothe). Haarmann was placed under surveillance. Being a trusted police informant, Haarmann was known to frequent Hanover Central Station. As he was well known to many officers from Hanover, two young policemen were drafted from Berlin to pose as undercover officers and discreetly observe his movements. The surveillance of Haarmann began on 18 June 1924.

== Arrest ==
On the night of 22 June, Haarmann was observed by the two undercover officers prowling Hanover's central station. He was soon observed arguing with a 15-year-old boy named Karl Fromm, then approaching police and insisting they arrest the youth on the charge of travelling upon forged documents. Upon his arrest, Fromm informed police he had been living with Haarmann for four days, and that he had been repeatedly raped by his accuser, sometimes as a knife was held to his throat. Haarmann was arrested the following morning and charged with sexual assault.

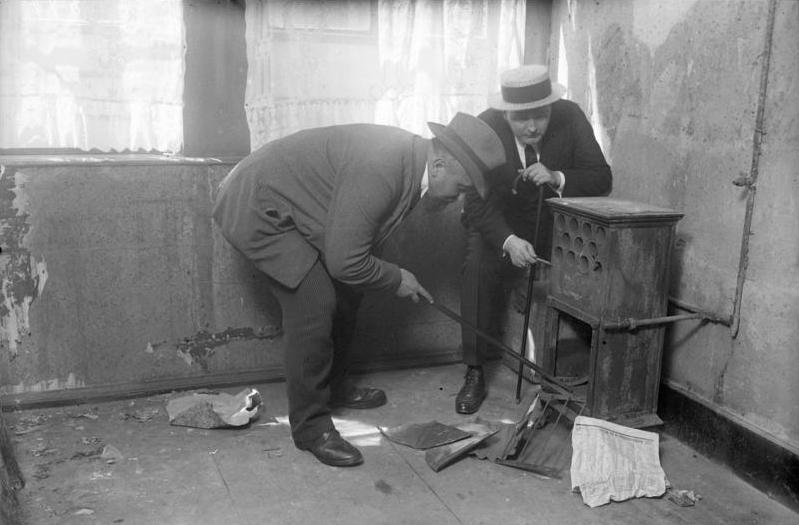
Detectives search a stove inside Haarmann's attic room at 2 Rote Reihe.

Following his arrest, Haarmann's attic apartment at No. 2 Rote Reihe was searched. Haarmann had lived in this single-room apartment since June 1923. The flooring, walls, and bedding within the apartment were found to be extensively bloodstained. Haarmann initially attempted to explain this fact as a by-product of his illegal trading in contraband meat. Various acquaintances and former neighbours of Haarmann were also extensively questioned as to his activities. Many fellow tenants and neighbours of the various addresses in which Haarmann lived since 1920 commented to detectives about the number of teenage boys they observed visiting his various addresses. Moreover, some had seen him leaving his property with concealed sacks, bags, or baskets—invariably in the late evening or early morning hours. Two former tenants informed police that, in the spring of 1924, they had discreetly followed Haarmann from his apartment and observed him discarding a heavy sack into the Leine River.

The clothes and personal possessions found at Haarmann's apartment and in the possession of his acquaintances were suspected of being the property of missing youths: all were confiscated and put on display at Hanover Police Station, with the parents of missing teenage boys from across Germany invited to look at the items. As the days passed, an increasing number of items were identified by family members as having belonged to their sons and brothers. Haarmann initially attempted to dismiss these revelations as being circumstantial in nature. He claimed that the majority of the clothes had been acquired through his business (trading used clothing), and that the remaining items had been left behind by youths with whom he'd engaged in consensual sexual activity.

The turning point came on 29 June when clothes, boots, and keys found stowed at Haarmann's apartment were identified as belonging to a missing 18-year-old named Robert Witzel. A skull that had been found in a garden on 20 May (which was not initially connected with other skeletal discoveries determined to be linked to Haarmann) was identified as that of the missing youth. A friend of Witzel's then identified the police officer whom Witzel had been seen with on the day of his disappearance as Haarmann.

Confronted with this evidence, Haarmann briefly attempted to bluster his way out of these latest and most damning pieces of evidence. When Witzel's jacket was found in the possession of his landlady and he was confronted with various witnesses' testimony as to his destroying identification marks on the clothing, he broke down and had to be supported by his sister. (Note: Of the 400 items of clothing found in Haarmann's apartment, only 100 were ever identified as having belonged to any of Haarmann's known victims.)

=== Confession ===
Faced with this latest evidence, and upon the urging of his sister, Haarmann confessed to raping, killing, and dismembering many young men in what he initially described as a "rabid sexual passion" between 1918 and 1924. According to Haarmann, he never actually intended to murder any of his victims, but would be seized by an irresistible urge to bite into or through their Adam's apple—often as he manually strangled them—in the throes of ecstasy, before typically collapsing atop the victim's body. Only one intended victim had escaped from Haarmann's apartment after he attempted to bite into his Adam's apple, although this individual is not known to have reported the attack to police.

All of Haarmann's victims' bodies were disposed of via dismemberment shortly after their murder, and Haarmann was insistent that he found the act of dismemberment extremely unpleasant; he had, he stated, been ill for eight days after his first murder. Nonetheless, Haarmann was insistent that his passion at the moment of murder was invariably "stronger than the horror of the cutting and the chopping" which would inevitably follow, and would typically take up to two days to complete.

To fortify himself to dismember his victims' bodies, Haarmann would pour himself a cup of strong black coffee, then place the body of his victim upon the floor of this apartment and cover the face with cloth, before first removing the intestines, which he would place inside a bucket. A towel would then be repeatedly placed inside the abdominal cavity to soak the collecting blood. He would then make three cuts between the victim's ribs and shoulders, then "take hold of the ribs and push until the bones around the shoulders broke." The victim's heart, lungs, and kidneys would then be removed, diced, and placed in the same bucket which held the intestines before the legs and arms would be severed from the body. Haarmann would then begin paring the flesh from the limbs and torso. This surplus flesh would be disposed of in the toilet or, usually, in the nearby river.

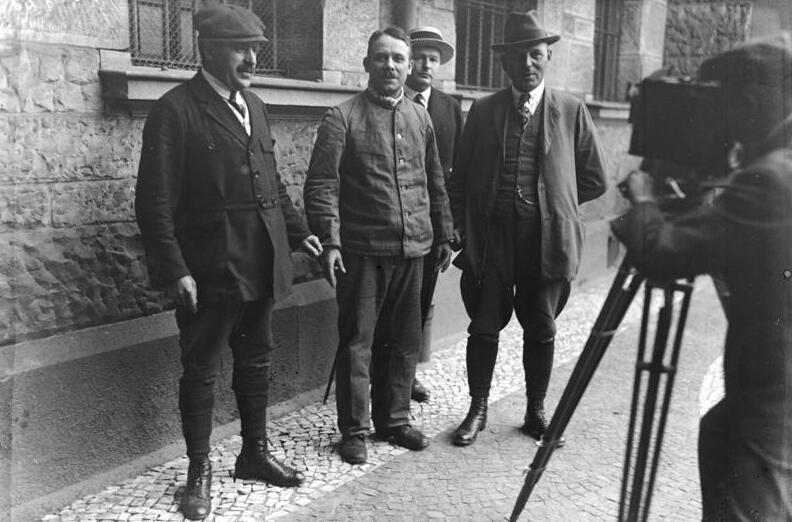
Fritz Haarmann (centre) with police detectives, November 1924

The final section of the victims' bodies to be dismembered was invariably the head. After severing the head from the torso, Haarmann would use a small kitchen knife to strip all flesh from the skull, which he would then wrap in rags and place face downwards upon a pile of straw and bludgeon with an axe until the skull splintered, enabling him to access the brain. This he would also place in a bucket, which he would pour, alongside the "chopped up bones" in the Leine.

Haarmann was insistent that none of the skulls found in the Leine belonged to his victims, and that the forensic identification of Robert Witzel's skull was mistaken, as he had almost invariably smashed his victims' skulls to pieces. The exceptions being those of his earliest victims—killed several years prior to his arrest—and that of his last victim, Erich de Vries. Although insistent that none of his murders were premeditated, investigators discovered much circumstantial evidence suggesting that several murders had been planned hours or days in advance, and that Haarmann had both concocted explanations for his victims' disappearances and dissuaded acquaintances of his victims from filing missing persons' reports with Hanover police. Investigators also noted that Haarmann would only confess to murders for which there existed evidence against him; on one occasion, Haarmann stated: "There are some [victims] you don't know about, but it's not those you think."

When asked how many victims he killed, Haarmann claimed, "Somewhere between fifty and seventy." The police, however, could only connect Haarmann with the disappearance of twenty-seven youths, and he was charged with twenty-seven murders—some of which he claimed had been committed upon the insistence of Grans, who was arrested on 8 July, and formally charged with being an accessory to murder one week later. (Note: In his initial confession to police, Haarmann stated that although Grans knew of many of his murders, and personally urged him to kill two of the victims so that he could obtain their clothing and personal possessions, Grans was otherwise not involved in the murder of the victims.)

On 16 August 1924, Haarmann underwent a psychological examination at a Göttingen medical school; on 25 September, he was judged competent to stand trial and returned to Hanover to await trial.

== Trial ==
The trial of Fritz Haarmann and Hans Grans began on 4 December 1924. Haarmann was charged with the murder of twenty-seven boys and young men who had disappeared between September 1918 and June 1924. In fourteen of these cases, Haarmann—who insisted upon conducting his own defence—acknowledged his guilt, although he claimed to be uncertain of the identification of the remaining thirteen victims upon the list of charges. Grans pleaded not guilty to charges of being an accessory to murder in several of the murders. Initially, following a thorough security search, all members of the public were permitted access to the courtroom, although by the third day the judge excluded all spectators from the courtroom as each murder was discussed in detail, due to the ongoing carnal and gruesome nature of the revelations.

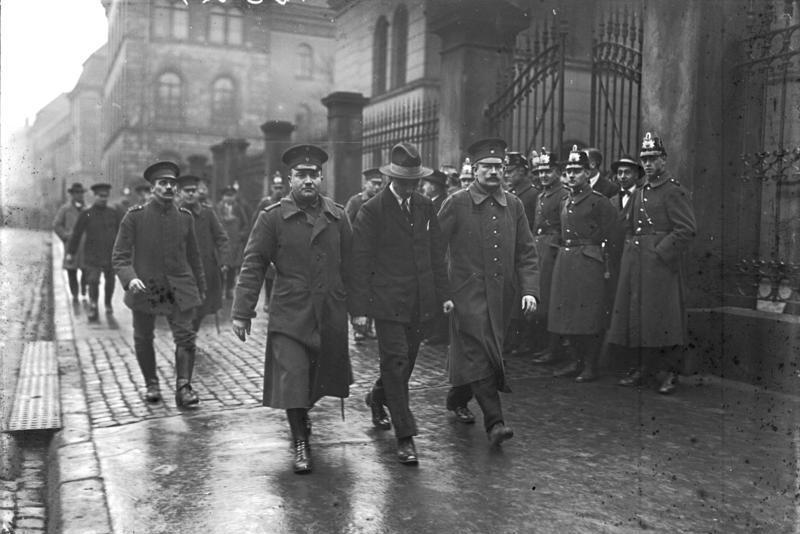
Hans Grans (head bowed) is escorted into court, December 1924.

The trial was one of the first major modern media events in Germany, and received extensive international press coverage, being described as the "most revolting [case] in German criminal history." Varying sensational headlines—in which Haarmann was variously referred to by such titles as the "Butcher of Hanover," the "Vampire of Hanover," the "Wholesale Murderer," and the "Wolf Man"—continuously appeared in the press.

Although Haarmann denied any premeditation in the crimes, and remained adamant the ultimate reason he killed was a "mystery" to him, he readily confessed to having killed fourteen of the victims for whose murder he was tried and to retaining and selling many of their possessions, although he denied having sold the body parts of any of his victims as contraband meat. Haarmann's denial that he had either consumed or sold human flesh would be supported by a medical expert, who testified on 6 December that none of the meat found in Haarmann's apartment following his arrest was human.

When asked to identify photographs of his victims, Haarmann became taciturn and dismissive as he typically claimed to be unable to recognize any of his victims' photographs; however, in instances where he claimed to be unable to recognize his victims' faces but the victims' clothing or other personal belongings had been found in his possession, he would simply shrug and make comments to the effect of, "I probably killed him," or: "Charge it to me; it's alright with me." For example, when asked to identify a photograph of victim Alfred Hogrefe, Haarmann stated: "I certainly assume I killed Hogrefe, but I don't remember his face." (Note: In their interrogations of Haarmann, investigators noted that he would only confess to murders for which sufficient physical or circumstantial evidence existed attesting to his guilt.)

Numerous exhibits were introduced into evidence in the opening days of the trial, including 285 sections of the skeletal structure—particularly skulls and thigh bones—recovered from the Leine and forensically determined as belonging to young men under 20 years of age, the bucket which he used to store and transport human remains, and the extensively bloodstained camp bed upon which he had killed many of the victims at his Rote Reihe address. As had been the case when earlier asked whether he could recognize the photographs of any of his victims, Haarmann's demeanour became dismissive upon the introduction of these exhibits; he denied any of the skulls introduced into evidence belonged to his victims, stating he had almost invariably "mashed" the victims' skulls, and had thrown only one undamaged skull into the Leine.

Several acquaintances and criminal associates of Haarmann testified for the prosecution, including former neighbours who testified to having purchased brawn or mince from Haarmann, whom they noted regularly left his apartment with packages of meat, but rarely arrived with them. Haarmann's landlady, Elisabeth Engel, testified that Haarmann would regularly pour chopped pieces of meat into boiling water and would strain fat from meat Haarmann claimed was pork. This fat would invariably be poured into bottles. On one occasion in April 1924, Haarmann's landlady and her family became ill after eating sausages in skins Haarmann claimed were sheep's intestines. Another neighbour testified to the alarming number of youths whom he had seen entering Haarmann's Neue Straße apartment, but whom he seldom observed leaving the address. This neighbour assumed Haarmann was selling youths to the Foreign Legion; another neighbour testified to having observed Haarmann throw a sack of bones into the Leine River. Two female acquaintances of Hans Grans also testified how, on one occasion in 1923, they discovered what they believed to be a human mouth boiling in a soup kettle in Haarmann's apartment; these witnesses testified they had taken the item to Hanover police, who simply replied the piece of flesh may have been a pig's snout. (Note: The precise origins of the contraband meat in which Haarmann had traded were never established.)

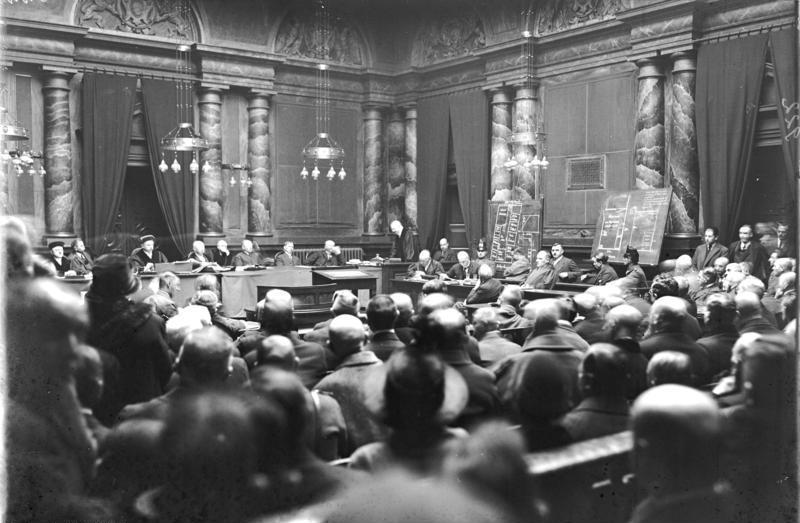
Haarmann (seated in front of chalkboard sketch of his apartment), during his trial in 1924

=== Police scrutiny ===
By the second week of the trial, testimony was introduced about how much the police knew about Haarmann's criminal activities after his 1918 release from prison. The police apparently never suspected him for any of the cases of missing boys and young men in Hanover in 1923 and 1924, even though some of the victims were last seen in his company, and he had a long criminal record that included charges of sexual assault and battery.

== Conviction ==
The trial lasted barely two weeks, and a total of 190 witnesses testified. On 19 December 1924, the court reconvened to impose sentence upon both defendants. Judged sane and accountable for his actions, Haarmann was found guilty of twenty-four of the twenty-seven murders and sentenced to death by beheading. He was acquitted of three murders which he denied committing. Upon hearing the sentence, Haarmann stood before the court and proclaimed, "I accept the verdict fully and freely", before adding: "I [shall] go to the decapitating block joyfully and happily." Grans became hysterical upon hearing he had been found guilty of incitement to murder and sentenced to death by beheading in relation to the murder of victim Adolf Hannappel, with an additional sentence of twelve years' imprisonment imposed for being an accessory to murder in the case of victim Fritz Wittig. Upon returning to his cell after hearing the verdict, Grans collapsed.

In the case of Hannappel, several witnesses testified to having seen Grans, in the company of Haarmann, pointing towards the youth. Haarmann claimed this was one of two murders committed upon the insistence of Grans and for this reason, Grans was sentenced to death. In the case of Wittig, police found a handwritten note from Haarmann, dated the day of Wittig's disappearance and signed by both him and Grans, in which Grans agreed to pay Haarmann 20 gold marks for the youth's suit. As the note indicated Grans' possible knowledge in the disappearance of Wittig, he was convicted of being an accomplice to Haarmann in this murder and sentenced to twelve years' imprisonment.

"Condemn me to death. I ask only for justice. I am not mad. Make it short; make it soon. Deliver me from this life, which is a torment. I will not petition for mercy, nor will I appeal. I want to pass just one more merry night in my cell, with coffee, cheese, and cigars, after which I will curse my father and go to my execution as if it were a wedding."
Fritz Haarmann addressing the court prior to his sentencing. December 1924.

Haarmann made no appeal against the verdict; claiming his death would atone for his crimes and stating that, were he at liberty, he would likely kill again. Grans did lodge an appeal against his sentence, although his appeal was rejected on 6 February 1925.

== Execution ==
At six o'clock on the morning of 15 April 1925, Haarmann was beheaded by guillotine in the grounds of Hanover prison. His executioner was Carl Gröpler. By German tradition, Haarmann was not informed of his execution date until the prior evening. Upon receipt of the news, he observed prayer with his pastor, before being granted his final wishes of an expensive cigar to smoke and Brazilian coffee to drink in his cell.

No members of the press were permitted to witness the execution, and the event was seen by only a handful of witnesses. According to published reports, although Haarmann was pale and nervous, he maintained a sense of bravado as he walked to the guillotine. The last words Haarmann spoke were: "I am guilty, gentlemen, but, hard though it may be, I want to die as a man." Immediately prior to placing his head upon the execution apparatus, Haarmann added: "I repent, but I do not fear death."

== Victims ==
The true tally of Haarmann's victims will never be known. Following his arrest, Haarmann made several imprecise statements regarding both the actual number of his victims he killed, and when he began killing. Initially, Haarmann claimed to have killed "maybe thirty, maybe forty" victims; later, he would claim the true number of victims he had killed was between fifty and seventy. (Note: Although Haarmann was charged with twenty-seven murders, by the second week of his trial, he had confessed to having committed three further murders for which he had not been formally charged.)

Date	Name	Age	Details	Conviction
September 1918	Hermann Koch	14	Koch was a 14-year-old youth who disappeared just weeks prior to Haarmann's first confirmed victim, Friedel Rothe. Haarmann is known to have kept company with Koch. He is also known to have written a letter to Koch's school providing an explanation for the youth's prolonged absence.	Not charged
25 September 1918	Friedel Rothe	17	Encountered Haarmann in a café, having run away from home. Haarmann claimed to have buried Rothe in Stöckener cemetery.	Yes
17 March 1922	Hans Keimes	17	Haarmann is strongly suspected of the murder of Hans Keimes, a Hanover youth who was reported missing on 17 March 1922. Keimes's nude, bound body was found in a canal on 6 May. A distinctive handkerchief bearing Grans' name was also found lodged in Keimes's throat.	Not charged
12 February 1923	Fritz Franke	17	Franke was a pianist, originally from Berlin. He encountered Haarmann in the Hanover station waiting rooms. All of Franke's personal possessions were given to Grans.	Yes
20 March 1923	Wilhelm Schulze	17	An apprentice writer who last informed his best friend he intended to run away from home. Schulze's clothing was found in the possession of Haarmann's landlady. Haarmann formally identified Schulze's possessions at his trial, stating: "It is possible I killed this Wilhelm Schulze, but I do not quite know."	Yes
23 May 1923	Roland Huch	16	Huch vanished from Hanover station after running away from home. Items of his clothing were traced to a lifeguard who later testified at Haarmann's trial that he obtained these items from Haarmann.	Yes
c. 31 May 1923	Hans Sonnenfeld	19	A runaway from the suburb of Limmer who is known to have associated with acquaintances at Hanover station. Sonnenfeld's coat and tie were found at Haarmann's apartment.	Yes
25 June 1923	Ernst Ehrenberg	13	The first known victim killed at Haarmann's Rote Reihe address. Ehrenberg was the son of Haarmann's neighbour. He never returned home after running an errand for his parents.	Yes
24 August 1923	Heinrich Struß	18	A carpenter's son from the suburb of Egestorf. Struß was last seen at a Hanover cinema. Haarmann was in possession of the youth's violin case when arrested.	Yes
24 September 1923	Paul Bronischewski	17	Vanished as he travelled home to the city of Bochum after visiting his uncle in Groß Garz. He was offered work by Haarmann when he alighted the train at Hanover.	Yes
c. 30 September 1923	Richard Gräf	17	Disappeared after informing his family a detective from Hanover had found him a job. Haarmann's landlady is known to have pawned Gräf's overcoat.	Yes
12 October 1923	Wilhelm Erdner	16	A locksmith's son from the town of Gehrden. Erdner disappeared as he cycled to work. Haarmann is known to have sold Erdner's bicycle on 20 October.	Yes
24 October 1923	Hermann Wolf	15	Wolf was last seen by his brother in the vicinity of Hanover station; his belt buckle was later found in Haarmann's apartment, although Haarmann would deny having killed Wolf at his trial. Haarmann was acquitted of this murder.	No
27 October 1923	Heinz Brinkmann	13	Vanished from Hanover station after missing his train home to Clausthal. A witness would later testify to having seen Haarmann and Grans conversing with Brinkmann in the waiting rooms at Hanover station.	Yes
10 November 1923	Adolf Hannappel	17	One of the few murder victims whom Haarmann readily confessed to killing. Hannappel was seen by several witnesses sitting in the waiting rooms at Hanover station—all of whom would later testify to having seen Haarmann approach Hannappel. Haarmann would himself claim to have committed this murder upon the urging of Hans Grans.	Yes
6 December 1923	Adolf Hennies	19	Hennies disappeared while looking for work in Hanover; his coat was found in the possession of Hans Grans. Haarmann would claim at his trial that, although he dismembered Hennies's body, Grans and another acquaintance were responsible for this murder. Haarmann was acquitted of this murder.	No
5 January 1924	Ernst Spiecker	17	Last seen by his mother on his way to appear as a witness at a trial. Grans was wearing Spiecker's shirt at the time of his arrest.	Yes
15 January 1924	Heinrich Koch	20	Although Haarmann claimed to be unable to recognize a photo of Koch, the youth was known to be an acquaintance of his. Koch's clothing and personal possessions were given to the son of Haarmann's landlady.	Yes
2 February 1924	Willi Senger	19	Senger had known Haarmann prior to his murder. Although Haarmann initially denied any involvement in the youth's disappearance, police established that Haarmann regularly wore Senger's coat after the youth had vanished.	Yes
8 February 1924	Hermann Speichert	16	An apprentice electrician from Linden-Limmer. Speichert's clothing is known to have been sold by the son of Haarmann's landlady; his geometry kit was given to Grans as a gift.	Yes
c. 1 April 1924	Hermann Bock	22	Bock was a labourer from the town of Uelzen, who had known Haarmann since 1921. He was last seen by his friends walking towards Haarmann's apartment. Although Haarmann was wearing Bock's suit when arrested, he was acquitted of this murder.	No
8 April 1924	Alfred Hogrefe	16	Ran away from home on 2 April following a family argument. He was repeatedly seen in the company of Haarmann at Hanover station in the days prior to his murder. All of Hogrefe's clothes were traced to Haarmann, Grans, or Haarmann's landlady.	Yes
17 April 1924	Wilhelm Apel	16	Disappeared on his way to work; Apel was lured from the Hanover-Leinhausen station to Haarmann's apartment. Much of his clothing was later sold by Haarmann's landlady.	Yes
26 April 1924	Robert Witzel	18	Last seen visiting a travelling circus; Witzel's skull was found on 20 May. The remainder of his body was thrown into the Leine River.	Yes
9 May 1924	Heinz Martin	14	An apprentice locksmith from the city of Chemnitz. His leather marine cap, shirt, and cardigan were all found in Haarmann's apartment. It is speculated that Martin disappeared from Hanover station while looking for work.	Yes
26 May 1924	Fritz Wittig	17	A travelling salesman from the town of Kassel. According to Haarmann, he had not wanted to kill Wittig but was persuaded to "take the boy" by Grans, who coveted Wittig's suit.	Yes
26 May 1924	Friedrich Abeling	10	The youngest victim. Abeling disappeared while playing truant from school. His skull was found in the Leine River on 13 June.	Yes
5 June 1924	Friedrich Koch	16	Vanished on his way to college. Koch was last seen by two acquaintances in the company of Haarmann.	Yes
14 June 1924	Erich de Vries	17	De Vries disappeared after informing his parents he intended to go for a swim in the Ohe River. Following his arrest, Haarmann led police to de Vries's dismembered skeletal remains, which he had discarded in a lake located at the entrance to the Herrenhausen Gardens.	Yes

Footnotes

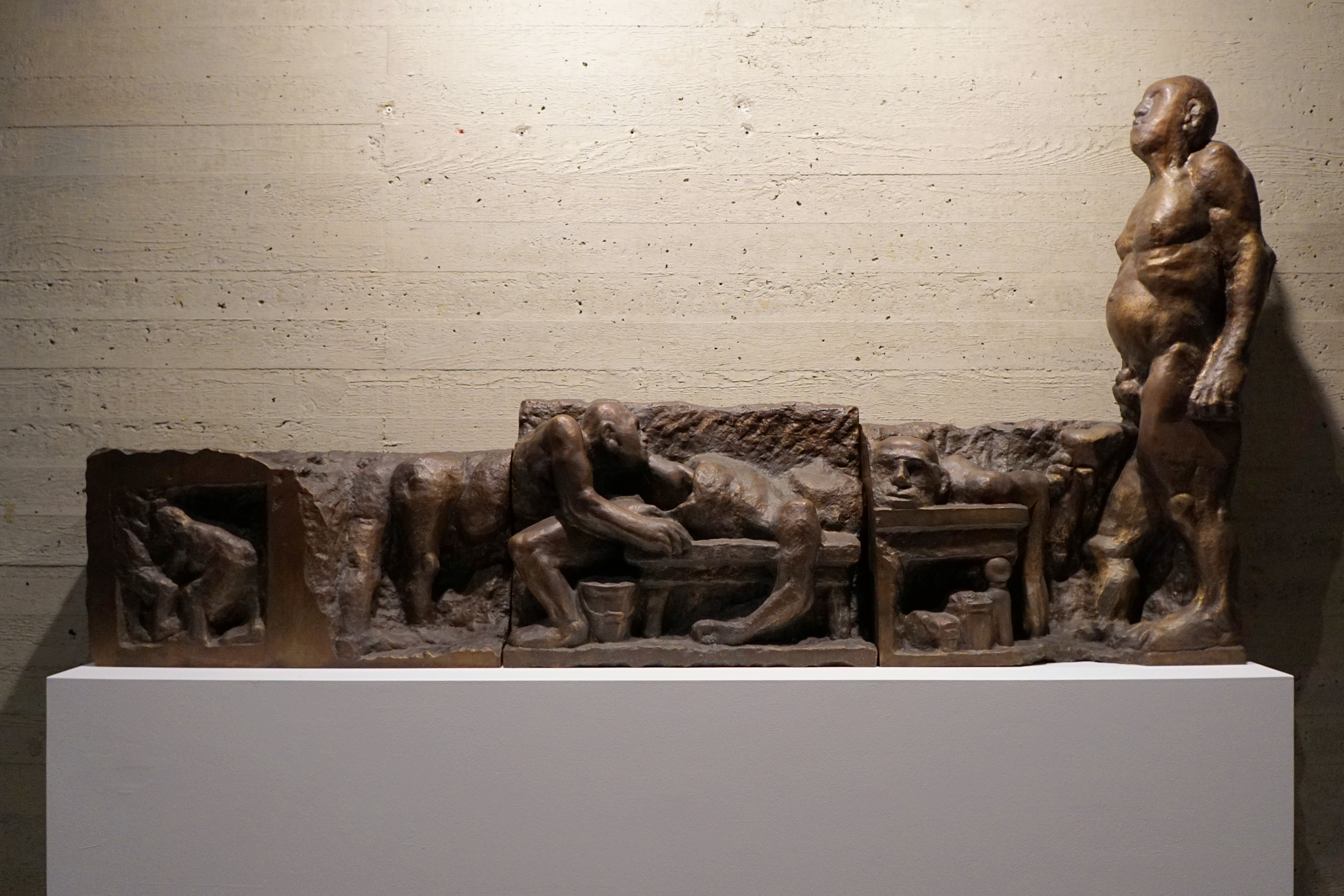
A bronze memorial depicting the crimes of Fritz Haarmann. This memorial is on display at Hanover's Sprengel Museum.

Haarmann was acquitted of three murders at his trial: those of Adolf Hennies, Hermann Wolf, and Hermann Bock. In each instance, strong circumstantial evidence existed attesting to his guilt.

In the case of Hermann Wolf, police established that prior to the youth's disappearance, he had informed his father he had conversed with a detective at Hanover station. Haarmann is known to have given many of Wolf's clothes to his landlady in the days immediately following his 44th birthday (shortly after Wolf was reported missing). Moreover, the youth's distinctive belt buckle was found at Haarmann's Rote Reihe address. Haarmann only chose to deny this murder midway through his trial, following heated threats made against him by the father of the murdered youth.

Haarmann was acquitted of the murder of Adolf Hennies due to conflicting testimony regarding the circumstances as to whether he or Grans actually murdered the youth. Although Haarmann admitted at his trial to having dismembered Hennies's body, he claimed to have returned to his apartment and "found a dead body lying there," to which, he claimed, Grans simply replied, "One of yours." Grans would deny this claim, and would state that he had bought Hennies's distinctive coat from Haarmann for eight Marks, after having been warned the coat was stolen. Due to this conflicting testimony, and the lack of an actual witness to the murder, neither Haarmann nor Grans were convicted of Hennies's murder.

In the case of Hermann Bock, several friends of his testified at Haarmann's trial that, prior to Haarmann's arrest, they were actively dissuaded from filing a missing person report with police; these witnesses testified that Haarmann was insistent on filing the report himself (he had never done so). Other witnesses testified to having acquired various personal possessions belonging to the youth from Haarmann. In addition, a tailor testified at Haarmann's trial to having been asked by Haarmann to alter the suit. Haarmann repeatedly contradicted himself regarding his claims as to how he acquired the youth's possessions. It is likely that Haarmann chose to deny this murder due to evidence suggesting the murder had been premeditated, as opposed to being committed in the throes of passion. He had known the youth for several years prior to his murder, and Bock was known to be heterosexual. Due to his denial of having committed this particular murder, Haarmann was acquitted.

=== Hermann Koch ===
In September 1918, Haarmann is believed to have killed a 14-year-old named Hermann Koch, a youth who disappeared just weeks prior to his first confirmed victim, Friedel Rothe. Haarmann is known to have kept company with Koch. He is also known to have written a letter to Koch's school providing an explanation for the youth's prolonged absence. As had been the case in the disappearance of Friedel Rothe, police had searched Haarmann's Cellerstraße apartment in search of the youth, although no trace of Koch was found and charges against Haarmann in relation to the disappearance were dropped. Koch's father had petitioned in 1921 for Haarmann to be tried for his son's murder however his requests were officially rejected.

=== Hans Keimes ===
Haarmann is also strongly suspected of the murder of Hans Keimes, a 17-year-old Hanover youth who was reported missing on 17 March 1922 and whose nude, bound body was found in a canal on 6 May. The cause of death was listed as strangulation, and the body bore no signs of mutilation. A distinctive handkerchief bearing Grans' name was found lodged in Keimes's throat.

Prior to the discovery of Keimes's body, Haarmann is known to have both visited the youth's parents offering to locate their son and to have immediately thereafter informed police that he believed Grans was responsible for Keimes's disappearance. However, Hans Grans is known to have been in custody at the time of the disappearance of Keimes.

Two weeks before the disappearance of Keimes, Haarmann had returned to his Neue Straße apartment, having served six months in a labour camp for several acts of theft he committed in August 1921. Upon his return, Haarmann discovered that Grans had stolen much of his personal property and fraudulently obtained and spent his military pension while he had been incarcerated. This resulted in a violent argument between the two men culminating in Haarmann evicting Grans. Shortly thereafter, Grans and a criminal acquaintance named Hugo Wittkowski returned and further ransacked the apartment. Haarmann likely murdered Keimes in an attempt to frame Grans in reprisal for the theft of his property and pension.

Haarmann was not tried for the murder of either Koch or Keimes. Officially, both cases remain unsolved.

== Aftermath ==
Following Haarmann's execution, his head was given to Göttingen University for their forensic medicine collection. The university later sent sections of his brain to the Max Planck Institute in Munich for forensic analysis; these samples—along with the rest of his brain—have since been lost. Haarmann's head was preserved in formalin and remained in the possession of the Göttingen University from 1925 until 2014, when it was cremated.

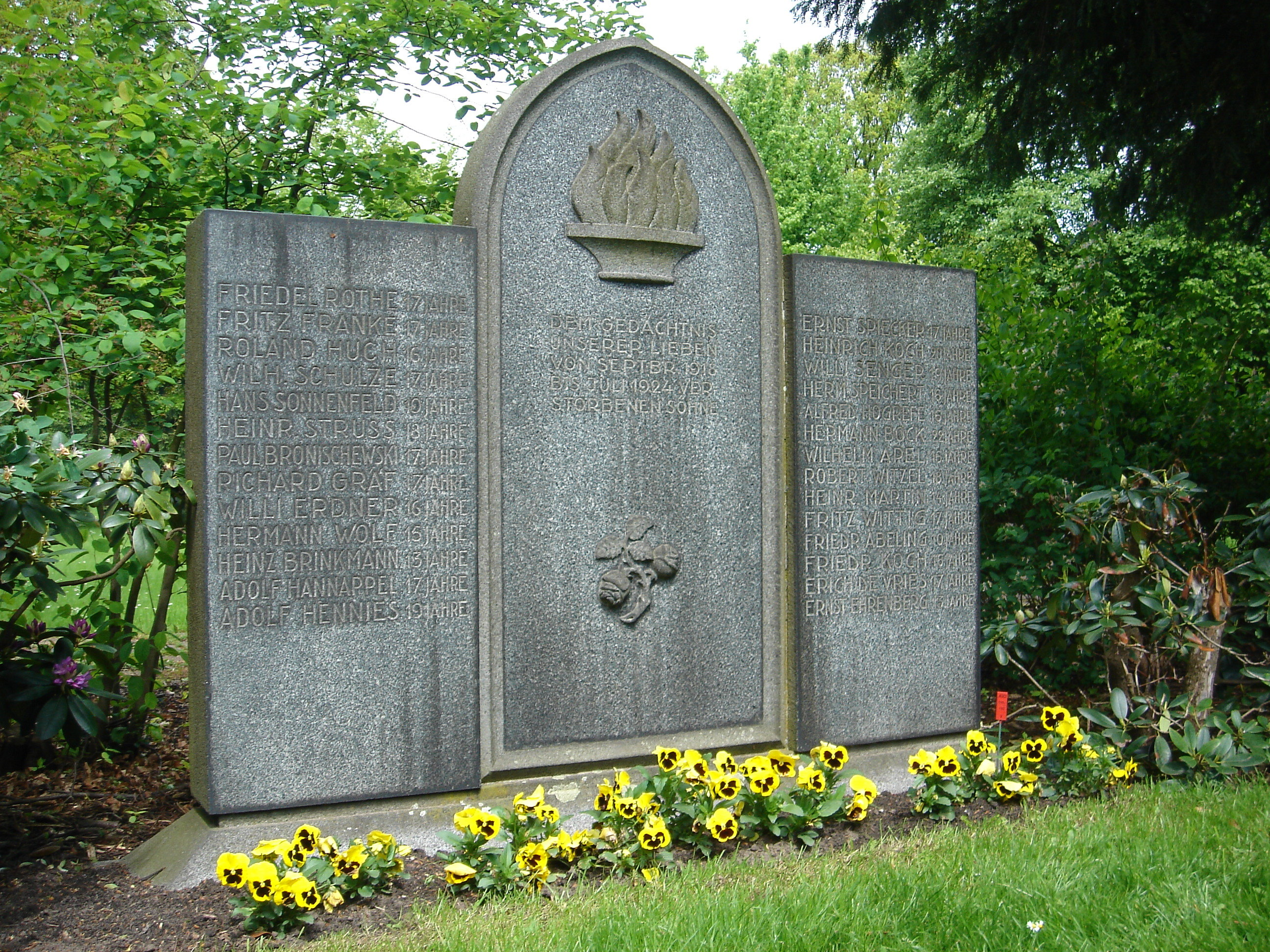
The communal grave of Haarmann's victims

The remains of Haarmann's victims which had been recovered were buried together in a communal grave in Stöckener Cemetery in February 1925. In April 1928, a large granite memorial in the form of a triptych, inscribed with the names and ages of the victims, was erected over the communal grave.

The discovery of a letter from Haarmann declaring Hans Grans' innocence subsequently led to Grans receiving a second trial. This letter was dated 5 February 1925, and was addressed to the father of Grans. In this letter, Haarmann claimed that although he had been frustrated at having been seen as little more than a "meal ticket" by Grans, Grans "had absolutely no idea that I killed". Furthermore, Haarmann claimed many of his accusations against Grans prior to his trial were obtained under extreme duress, and that he falsely accused Grans of instigating the murders of Hannappel and Witzel as a means of revenge. Haarmann claimed that his pastor would be informed as to the contents and the authenticity of the letter.

Hans Grans was retried in January 1926. He was charged with aiding and abetting Haarmann in the murders of victims Adolf Hannappel and Fritz Wittig. Although Grans stated in one address to the judge at this second trial that he expected to be acquitted, on 19 January, he was again found guilty of aiding and abetting Haarmann in both cases, although in this instance, he was sentenced to two concurrent 12-year sentences. He initially served his sentence at Celle Prison, but was transferred to Sachsenhausen concentration camp in 1937, where he remained until the camp's liberation in April 1945. Following the camp's liberation, Grans and several other former prisoners were returned to Celle Prison, where he remained until his release in January 1946.

Following his release from prison, Grans continued to live in Hanover until his death in 1975.

The murders committed by Haarmann stirred much discussion in Germany regarding methods used in police investigation, the treatment of mentally ill offenders, and the validity of the death penalty. However, the most heated topic of discussion in relation to the murders committed by Haarmann were issues relating to the subject of homosexuality, which was then illegal and punishable by imprisonment in Germany. The discovery of the murders subsequently stirred a wave of homophobia throughout Germany, with one historian noting: "It split the [gay rights] movement irreparably, fed every prejudice against homosexuality, and provided new fodder for conservative adversaries of legal sex reform."

Poster of Fritz Lang's 1931 film M

== Media ==
=== Film ===
- The first film to draw inspiration from the Haarmann case, M, was released in 1931. Directed by Fritz Lang, M starred Peter Lorre as a fictional child killer named Hans Beckert. In addition to drawing inspiration from the case of Fritz Haarmann, M was also inspired by the then-recent and notorious crimes of Peter Kürten and Carl Großmann.
- The film The Tenderness of the Wolves (Die Zärtlichkeit der Wölfe) was directly based upon Haarmann's crimes. This film was released in July 1973 and was directed by Ulli Lommel. The Tenderness of the Wolves was both written by and starred Kurt Raab, who cast himself as Fritz Haarmann. German film director Rainer Werner Fassbinder produced the film and also appeared in a minor role as Haarmann's criminal accomplice, Hugo Wittkowski.
- The most recent film to be directly based upon Haarmann's murder spree, Der Totmacher (The Deathmaker), was released in 1995. This film starred Götz George as Haarmann. Der Totmacher focuses upon the written records of the psychiatric examinations of Haarmann conducted by Ernst Schultze; one of the main psychiatric experts who was to testify at Haarmann's 1924 trial. The plot of Der Totmacher revolves around Haarmann's interrogation after his arrest, as he is being interviewed by a court psychiatrist.
- The 2010 film Cyrus: Mind of a Serial Killer, written and directed by Mark Vadik, was loosely based on both Haarmann and American serial killer Henry Lee Lucas.

=== Books ===
- Lane, Brian; Gregg, Wilfred (1992) The Encyclopedia of Serial Killers ISBN 978-0-747-23731-0
- Lessing, Theodor (1925) Monsters of Weimar: Haarmann, the Story of a Werewolf ISBN 1-897743-10-6
- Marriner, Brian (1992) Cannibalism: The Last Taboo! ISBN 1-859-58495-0
- Wilson, Colin; Wilson, Damon (2006) The World's Most Evil Murderers: Real-Life Stories of Infamous Killers ISBN 978-1-405-48828-0

== See also ==
- Capital punishment in Germany
- List of German serial killers
- List of serial killers by number of victims
- Weimar Republic

== Cited works and further reading ==
- Cawthorne, Nigel; Tibballs, Geoff (1993). Killers: The Ruthless Exponents of Murder. London: Boxtree Books. pp. 415–17. ISBN 0-7522-0850-0.
- Cawthorne, Nigel (1999). The World's Greatest Serial Killers. London: Chancellor Press. ISBN 978-0-753-70089-1.
- Gibson, Dirk (2009). Serial Killing for Profit: Multiple Murder for Money. Santa Barbara: Praeger. ISBN 978-0-313-37890-4.
- Kavalovski, Joshua (2015). "The Haarmann Case: Remapping the Weimar Republic". The German Quarterly. New Jersey: John Wiley & Sons, Inc. ISSN 0016-8831.
- Lane, Brian; Gregg, Wilfred (1995) [1992]. The Encyclopedia Of Serial Killers. New York City: Berkley Book. pp. 205–06. ISBN 978-0-425-15213-3.
- Lane, Brian (1995). Chronicle of 20th Century Murder. Wiltshire: Select Editions. p. 82. ISBN 978-0-425-14649-1.
- Lessing, Theodor (1993) [1925]. Monsters of Weimar: Haarmann, the Story of a Werewolf. London: Nemesis Books. pp. 11–156. ISBN 1-897743-10-6.
- Pozsár, Christine; Farin, Michael (2002) [1995]. Die Haarmann-Protokolle. Reinbek: Rowohlt Verlag. ISBN 3-936-29800-9.
- Tatar, Maria (1995). Lustmord. Sexual Murder in Weimar Germany. Princeton: Princeton University Press. ISBN 0-6910-1590-2.
- Wilson, Colin; Wilson, Damon (January 2007). The World's Most Evil Murderers: Real-Life Stories of Infamous Killers. Bath: Parragon Publishing. pp. 17–20. ISBN 978-1-405-48828-0.
- Wilson, Colin; Wilson, Damon; Wilson, Rowan (1993). World Famous Murders. London: Parragon. pp. 386–89. ISBN 978-0-752-50122-2.
- Wynn, Douglas (1996). On Trial for Murder. Pan Books. pp. 71–72. ISBN 0-09-472990-5.
