= Mark Roseman =

English historian

Mark Roseman (born c. 1958) is an English historian of modern Europe with a particular interest in the Holocaust. He received his B.A. at Christ's College, Cambridge and his PhD at the University of Warwick. As of 2007 he holds the Pat M. Glazer Chair of Jewish Studies at Indiana University (Bloomington).

== Awards ==
- 2001 Jewish Quarterly-Wingate Literary Prize, A Past in Hiding
- 2002 Mark Lynton History Prize, A Past in Hiding
- 2003 Geschwister-Scholl-Preis, In einem unbewachten Augenblick. Eine Frau überlebt im Untergrund.

== Books ==
- 1992: Recasting the Ruhr 1945–1959: Manpower, Economic Recovery and Labour Relations. Oxford: Berg Publishers, ISBN 9780854966066.
- 2001: A Past in Hiding: Memory and Survival in Nazi Germany. New York: Metropolitan Books, ISBN 9780805063264.
- 2002: The Villa, The Lake, The Meeting: Wannsee and the Final Solution. Harmondsworth: Penguin, ISBN 9780713995701. [Published in the US as The Wannsee Conference and the Final Solution: A Reconsideration. New York: Metropolitan Books, ISBN 9780805068108.]
- 2017: (ed. with Devin O. Pendas and Richard Wetzell) Beyond the Racial State: Rethinking Nazi Germany. Cambridge: Cambridge University Press, ISBN 9780805068108.
- 2019: Lives Reclaimed: A Story of Rescue and Resistance in Nazi Germany. New York: Metropolitan Books, ISBN 9781627797870.
- 2020: Überleben im Dritten Reich: Handlungsräume und Perspektiven von Juden und ihren Helfern. Göttingen: Wallstein, ISBN 978-3-8353-3777-0.

== Edited volumes ==
- 1995: Generations in Conflict: Youth Revolt and Generation Formation in Germany, 1770–1968. Cambridge: Cambridge University Press, 1995.
- 2025: The Cambridge History of the Holocaust. Vol. I–IV, Cambridge: Cambridge University Press, 2025.
