= Kerstin Brückweh =

German historian

Kerstin Brückweh (born in Hannover, Germany) is a historian with a focus on German and British modern and contemporary history. She is a professor in economic and social history at the Berlin University of Applied Sciences and Technology in Berlin, Germany.

== Career ==
Brückweh received her PhD from the History Department of Bielefeld University in 2005. Her dissertation, Mordlust: Serienmorde, Gewalt und Emotionen im 20. Jahrhundert (Mordlust: Serial Murders, Violence and Emotions in the 20th Century), was published by Campus-Verlag in 2006. From 2007 to 2013, she was a research fellow at the German Historical Institute London. She completed her habilitation thesis at the University of Tübingen in 2013 with the work Menschen zählen: Wissensproduktion durch britische Volkszählungen und Umfragen vom 19. Jahrhundert bis ins digitale Zeitalter (Britain Counts: Knowledge Production in Censuses and Survey Research from the Nineteenth Century to the Digital Age). It was published by De Gruyter Oldenbourg in 2015.

In 2016–2020, Brückweh led the research group “The Longue Durée of 1989/90: Regime Change and Everyday Life in East Germany” at the Leibniz Centre for Contemporary History Potsdam in Germany. In October 2020, parts of the project were published by Ch. Links Verlag under the project’s German name, Die lange Geschichte der “Wende”. The project also won the WISPoP – Potsdamer Preis für Wissenschaftskommunikation (Potsdam Prize for Scholarly Communication) in 2020.

Brückweh works at the Berlin University of Applied Sciences and Technology as a professor of economic and social history. Previously, she worked at the University of Trier and the University of Duisburg-Essen, and was a fellow at the Max Weber College for Cultural and Social Studies at the University of Erfurt. Prior to her studies, she also worked as bookseller for three years and, following her PhD, she was an editor in the fields of politics, economics, and history at Stark Verlagsgesellschaft mbH & Co.KG for two years.

== Selected bibliography ==
- Brückweh, Kerstin (2005). Mordlust: Serienmorde, Gewalt und Emotionen im 20. Jahrhundert. Frankfurt and New York: Campus-Verlag. ISBN 978-3-593-38202-9.
- Brückweh, Kerstin (Ed.). (2011). The Voice of the Citizen Consumer: A History of Market Research, Consumer Movements, and the Political Public Sphere. Oxford: Oxford University Press. ISBN 978-0-19-960402-9.
- Brückweh, Kerstin; Schumann, Dirk; Wetzell, Richard; and Ziemann, Benjamin (Eds.). (2012). Engineering Society: The Role of the Human and Social Sciences in Modern Societies, 1880–1980. Basingstoke: Palgrave Macmillan. ISBN 978-1-137-28450-1.
- Brückweh, Kerstin. (2015). Menschen zählen: Wissensproduktion durch britische Volkszählungen und Umfragen vom 19. Jahrhundert bis ins digitale Zeitalter. Berlin: De Gruyter Oldenbourg. ISBN 978-3-11-040778-5.
- Brückweh, Kerstin. (4 December 2017). "The History of Knowledge: An Indispensable Perspective for Contemporary History". History of Knowledge: Research, Resources, and Perspectives.
- Brückweh, Kerstin; Villinger, Clemens; and Zöller, Kathrin (Eds.). (2020). Die lange Geschichte der “Wende”: Geschichtswissenschaft im Dialog. Berlin: Ch. Links Verlag. ISBN 978-3-96289-103-9.
