= Richard Wetzell =

American historian

- Born: August 5, 1961 (age 65)

Academic background
- Education: Swarthmore College; Stanford University; Columbia University

Academic work
- Discipline: German criminology

Richard Friedrich Wetzell (born 5 August 1961) is an American historian specializing in German criminology and research fellow at the German Historical Institute.

He graduated from Swarthmore College and specialized in European history at Columbia University and Stanford University, where he earned a master's degree and doctorate, respectively.

== Selected publications ==
- Wetzell, Richard F. (2000). Inventing the Criminal: A History of German Criminology, 1880-1945. University of North Carolina Press. ISBN 9780807825358.
- Becker, Peter; Wetzell, Richard F., eds. (2005). Criminals and their Scientists: The History of Criminology in International Perspective. Cambridge University Press. ISBN 9780521120739.
- Wetzell, Richard F. (2014). Crime and Criminal Justice in Modern Germany (Studies in German History Book 16). Berghahn Books. ISBN 9781782382461.
- Brückweh, Kerstin; Schumann, Dirk; Wetzell, Richard; Ziemann, Benjamin, eds. (2012). Engineering Society: The Role of the Human and Social Sciences in Modern Societies, 1880-1980. Palgrave MacMillan. ISBN 9781349326808.
- Pendas, Devin O.; Roseman, Mark; Wetzell, Richard, eds. (2017). Beyond the Racial State: Rethinking Nazi Germany. Cambridge University Press. ISBN 9780805068108.
