= Scharfrichter =

Historic German term for executioner

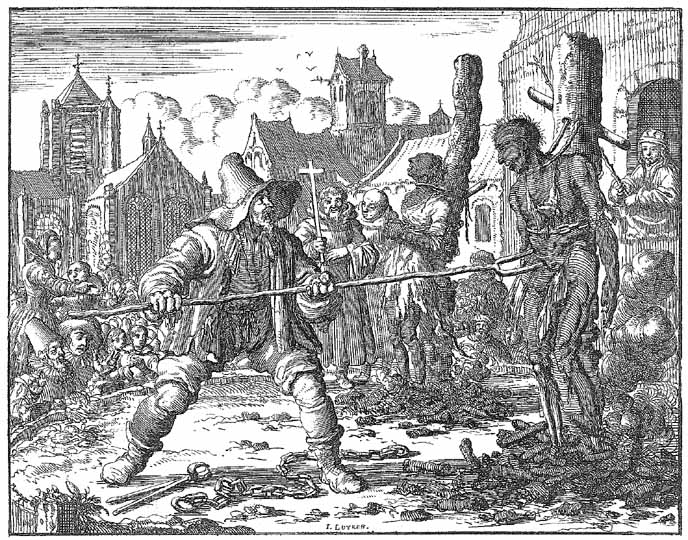

The term Scharfrichter (German for executioner, literally: "sharp judge") refers specifically to a tradition of executioners in the German states. Using a sword of execution, they had the responsibility of actually executing prisoners; his assistant, the "Löwe" (lion), would carry out tasks such as forcibly conveying prisoners to the presence of a judge (while roaring, hence the name), "rubbish clearance", burying unwanted bodies, and carrying out brandings. The Scharfrichter was a well-known figure nicknamed the "Mate of Death" and instantly recognizable in their traditional black frock coat and silk top hat.

The word "Scharfrichter" is composed of the words "scharf" (sharp/edged), and "Richter" (judge), because he had to do justice (richten) with the sword.

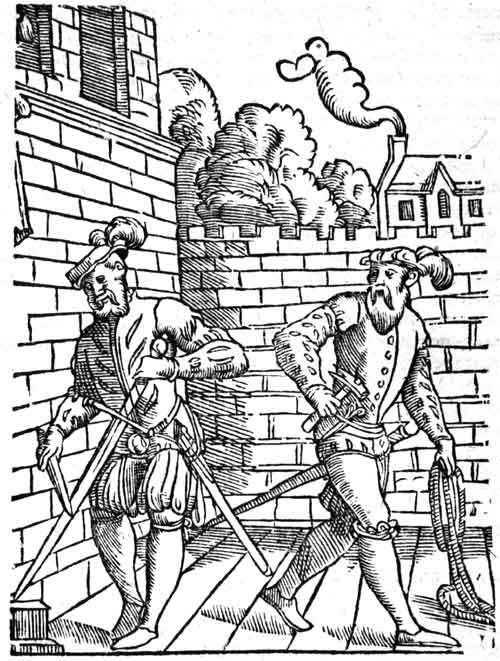

== See also ==
- Scharfrichterhaus
