= Tattersall =

Tattersall may refer to:

== People ==
- Alfred James Tattersall (1866–1951), New Zealand photographer
- David Tattersall (born 1960), British cinematographer
- Gale Tattersall (born 1948), British-American film maker and cinematographer
- Geoffrey Tattersall (1947–2025), British jurist and Anglican bishop, judge on the Isle of Man
- Geoffry Tattersall (1882–1972), English cricketer
- George Tattersall (1817–1849), English sporting artist
- Henry Tattersall (1892–1971), New Zealand cricketer
- Ian Tattersall (born 1945), American paleoanthropologist and curator
- John Lincoln Tattersall (1865–1942), English cotton merchant
- Jonny Tattersall (born 1994), English cricketer
- Kathleen Tattersall (1942–2013), British educationalist
- Mark Tattersall (born 1984), British journalist
- Philippa Tattersall (born 1975), Royal Marine officer
- Richard Tattersall (1724–1795), English founder of racehorse auctioneer Tattersalls
- Roy Tattersall (1922–2011), English cricketer
- Thomas Tattersall (c. 1874–1905), English murderer
- Wally Tattersall (1888–1968), English football player
- Walter Medley Tattersall (1882–1943), English zoologist and marine biologist
- William Tattersall, English football player
- Viva Tattersall (1898–1989), British actress
- Zoe Tattersall, fictional character in the soap opera Coronation Street

== Horse racing ==
- Somerville Tattersall Stakes, a horse race in England
- Tattersalls Gold Cup, a horse race in Ireland
- Tattersalls Park, a racecourse in Tasmania
- Tattersalls, an English auctioneer of race horses
- Tattersall's Limited, an Australian gambling company (1895-2005) now Tatts Group

== Clothing ==
- Tattersall (cloth), a checked pattern woven into cloth

== Clubs ==
- City Tattersalls Club, a social club in Sydney, Australia
- Nemzeti Lovarda - Historic equestrian centre in Budapest, Hungary, historically known as the Tattersall.
- South Australian Tattersalls Club
- Tattersalls Club, an historic building in Brisbane, Australia, previously a sporting venue
- Tattersall Golf Club in Pennsylvania, now known as Broad Run Golfer's Club

== Places ==
- Tattersall Farm, in Haverhill, Massachusetts
- Tattersall Farm, in Lancashire, England
