= Tattersalls =

British race horse auction house

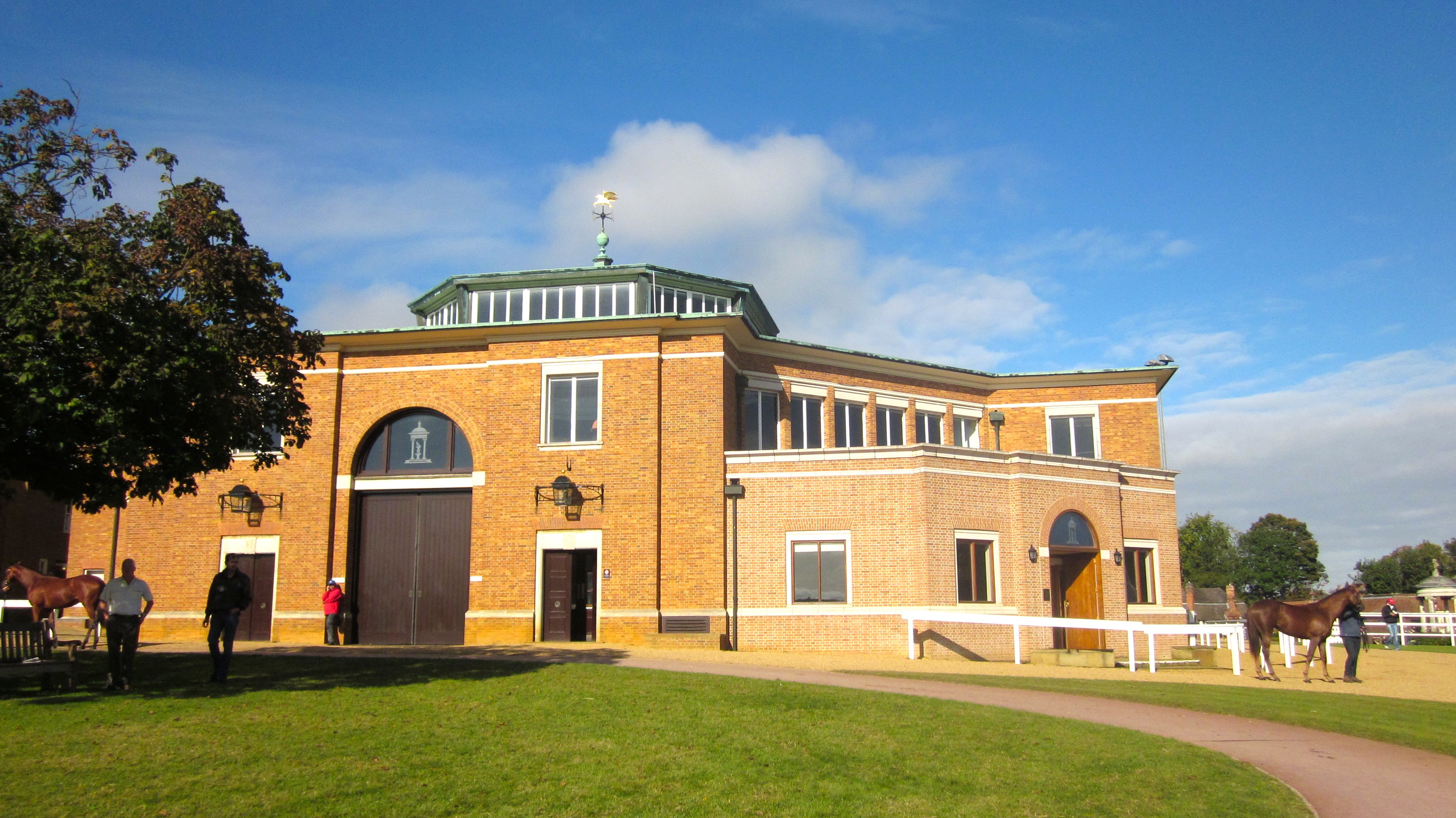
- Tattersalls sales ring, Newmarket
- Headquarters: Newmarket, Suffolk, United Kingdom
- Website: tattersalls.com

Tattersalls (formerly Tattersall's) is the main auctioneer of race horses in the United Kingdom and Ireland.

== Founding ==
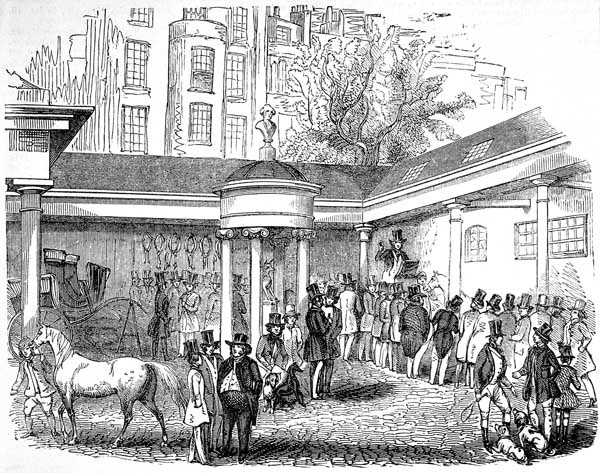
Tattersall's at Hyde Park Corner in 1842.

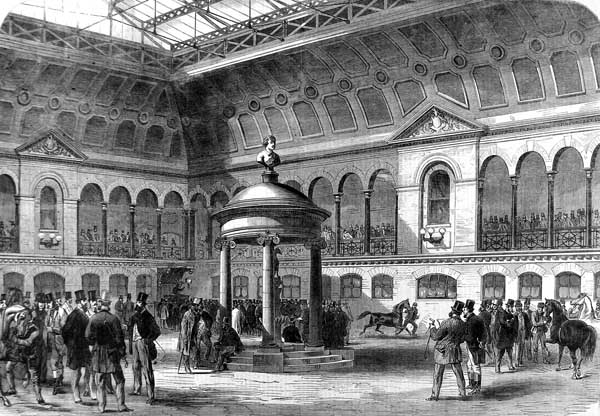
Tattersall's new premises in Knightsbridge in 1865.

It was founded in 1766 by Richard Tattersall (1724–1795), who had been stud groom to the second Duke of Kingston. The first premises occupied were near Hyde Park Corner, in what was then the outskirts of London. Two "Subscription rooms" were reserved for members of the Jockey Club, and they became the rendezvous for sporting and betting men. Among the famous dispersal sales conducted by "Old Tatt" were those of the Duke of Kingston's stud in 1774 and of the stud of the Prince of Wales (afterwards George IV) in 1786. The prince often visited Richard Tattersall, and was joint proprietor with him of the Morning Post for several years. He was succeeded by his son, Edmund Tattersall (1758–1810), who extended the business of the firm to France. The third of the dynasty, Richard Tattersall (1785–1859), the eldest of Edmund's three sons, became head of the firm at his father's death. He had his grandfather's ability and tact, and was the intimate of the best sporting men of his time. Another Richard Tattersall (1812–1870), son of the last, then took command of the business. His great-grandfather's 99-year lease having expired, he moved the business to Knightsbridge in 1865. Richard was followed by his cousin, Edmund Tattersall (1816–1898), and he by his eldest son, Edmund Somerville Tattersall (1863–1942).

== 20th century ==
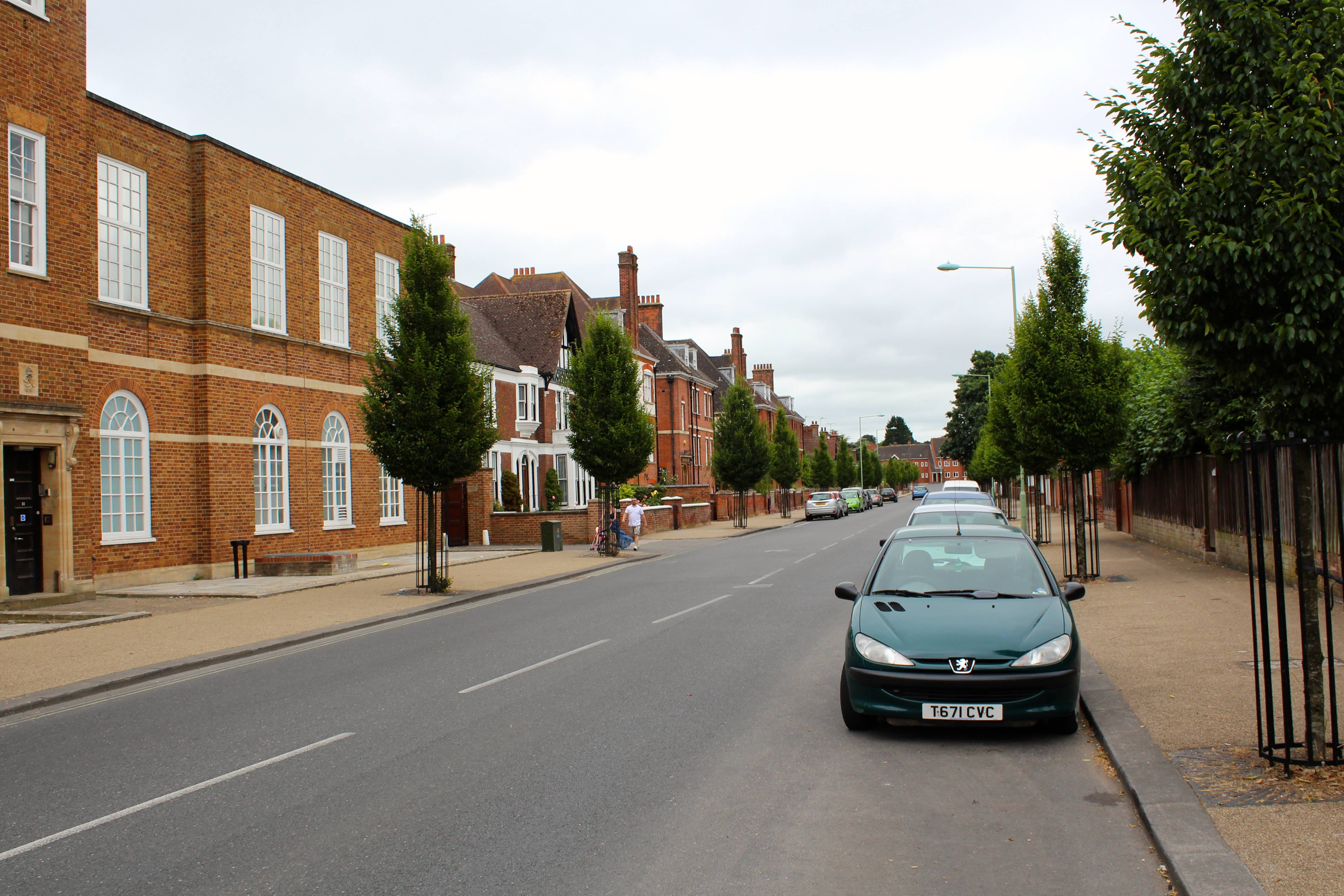
The Avenue in Newmarket, Suffolk, UK

Tattersall's remained a family business until Somerville Tattersall's death in 1942, when it was passed to his partners, Gerald Deane, Robert Needham and Terrence Watt. At this time Major Gerald Deane took over as chairman. In 1965 it introduced bloodstock auctions at Park Paddocks, Newmarket, and in 1988 it also began holding auctions at Old Fairyhouse in County Meath, Ireland. Tattersalls Ltd (which has dropped the apostrophe from its name) is now based in Newmarket. There is a separate company in Ireland, but it shares some of the same directors.

== 21st century ==
Today, Tattersalls is the leading bloodstock auctioneer in Europe, selling 10,000 horses a year. It still prices horses in guineas (originally 21 shillings and now one pound and five pence), in accordance with horse-racing tradition.

The firm (at the time trading under the style of "Messrs. Tattersall") set a judicial precedent on the taxability of unclaimed balances (purchase moneys for horses that had been paid to the firm but which had gone unclaimed for substantial periods of time by the firm's clients). In Morley v Tattersall (1938), the English Court of Appeal held that such sums were not to be treated as profits for the purposes of income tax.

In Ireland, a yearling Sadler's Wells filly, later named Liffey Dancer, set a new world record price of $5,330,000 at the October Tattersalls Book 1 sale. (The previous sale record price was set at the 2000 Keeneland yearling sale for Moon's Whisper at $4.4 million.)

In the 2010s author Jilly Cooper visited the business as research for her novel Mount!

In 2014 Tattersalls Ltd announced that it had acquired a majority stake in Osarus, a bloodstock-sales company based in the South West region of France which has been rapidly establishing itself within the French market since its founding in 2007. The purchase was a reflection of the French racing and breeding industry at the time, which, according to Tattersalls chairman, is respected and admired throughout the world.

Continuing in this trend, Tattersalls Ltd announced the completion of its purchase of the bloodstock auctioneering business of Brightwells Ltd in October 2015. It planned to promote the former Brightwells Bloodstock division as the Tattersalls Ireland Cheltenham and Tattersalls Ireland Ascot Sales.

== See also ==
- George Tattersall (1817–1849), a son of the second Richard Tattersall, who was a well-known sporting artist.
- Tattersall, a type of cloth named after the business, used commonly in modern shirts. During the 18th century at Tattersall's horse market blankets with this checked pattern were sold for use on horses.
