= Richard Tattersall =

English horse auctioneer

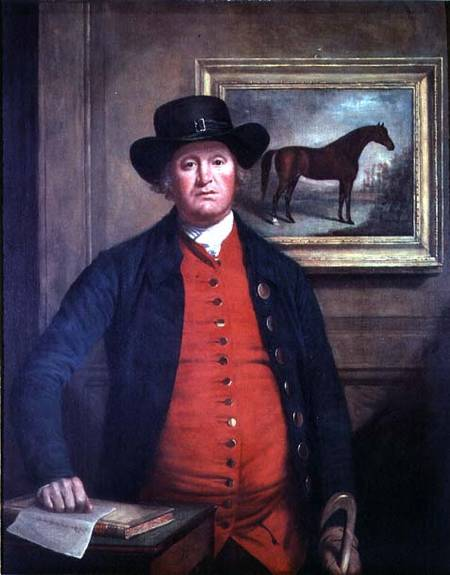
- Richard Tattersall, painted c. 1790 by Thomas Beach
- Born: 1724; Hurstwood, Lancashire
- Died: 21 February 1795 (aged 70–71)
- Occupation: Horse auctioneer
- Known for: Founder of Tattersalls racehorse auctioneer

Richard Tattersall (June 1724 – 21 February 1795) was an English horse auctioneer and the founder of the racehorse auctioneers Tattersalls.

== Early life ==
Tattersall was born in Hurstwood in Lancashire, and was educated at Burnley Grammar School. He left home in 1745, apparently because his father had thwarted his ardent desire to join the Jacobite rebels. He had an interest in horses from an early age, and entering the service of Evelyn Pierrepont, 2nd Duke of Kingston-upon-Hull, he soon rose to be his stud-groom.

== Horse auctioneer ==
Having put by a considerable sum of money, Tattersall purchased in 1766 from the Earl of Grosvenor the ninety-nine years' lease of premises at Hyde Park Corner (then an outlying part of London). There he set up as a horse auctioneer. His straightforward honesty and businesslike precision won him admiration. He soon numbered among his clients the chief members of the Jockey Club and the nobility, and he procured horses for the king of France and the dauphin.

In 1774, Tattersall sold the stud of his former patron, the Duke of Kingston-upon-Hull, and had some difficulty in resisting the claims to the proceeds of the rapacious Elizabeth Chudleigh, Duchess of Kingston. Early in 1779 he bought the famous racer Highflyer from Lord Bolingbroke for what was deemed the enormous price of £2,500, being then described as "Richard Tattersall of the parish of St. George-in-the-Fields, liberty of Westminster, gentleman."

== Further business ventures ==
He now started a stud farm at Dawley in Middlesex (near Hayes, Hillingdon), which, together with his reputation for integrity, became the cornerstone of his large fortune. About the same time he fitted up two rooms at Hyde Park Corner for the use of the members of the Jockey Club; and these "subscription rooms" soon became a most important resort of the sporting world, and the centre whence all betting upon the turf was regulated.

Tattersall purchased New Barns, near Ely, known thenceforth as Highflyer Hall, where he regaled chosen spirits, such as the Prince of Wales (afterwards George IV), Charles James Fox and William Windham, with "some of the best port in England." The prince is said to have made Tattersall his almoner for the relief of certain elderly racing-enthusiasts, and in honour of his patron the auctioneer erected the cupola with a bust of the prince as a youth and an effigy of a fox, known as "the palladium of Tattersall's."

He was given the responsibility of the arrangements for the sale of the prince's stud in July 1786. About 1788 Tattersall became proprietor of the Morning Post, which, in spite of the clever verses of Peter Pindar (John Wolcot) and the attention paid to sporting matters, proved a losing venture. The property was made over for a nominal sum in 1792 to Daniel Stuart.

"Old Tatt," as he was called in later days to distinguish him from younger members of the dynasty, died on 21 February 1795, and was buried in St George's, Hanover Square. His popularity was so widespread that he was said to be "free of the road, as no highwayman would molest him, and even a pickpocket returned his handkerchief, with compliments."

== Family ==
Richard Tattersall married Catharine, a granddaughter of James, twelfth Baron Somerville; they had one son: Edmund (1758–1810), who succeeded his father in the business and proprietorship of "the Corner", and extended the business to France. Edmund's son Richard ("Old Dick", 1785–1859) and his son Richard ("Young Mr Richard", 1812–1870) later headed the business.

A great-grandson of "Old Tatt", and younger brother of "Young Mr Richard", was George Tattersall. An architect and artist, sometimes known as "Wildrake", he published work including illustrations of racehorses.
