= Nemzeti Lovarda =

Historic equestrian centre in Budapest, Hungary

Coordinates: 47.4985°N 19.0867°E

- Former names: Tattersall
- Address: Kerepesi út 7
- Location: Józsefváros, Budapest, Hungary
- Operator: N.L. Sportlétesítmény Nonprofit Kft.
- Type: Equestrian centre

Construction
- Opened: 1878
- Renovated: 1931–1932; 2016–2018
- Architect: Ferenc Paulheim Jr. (1932 main building)

Website
- nemzetilovarda.hu

The Nemzeti Lovarda (National Riding Hall), historically known as the Tattersall, is an equestrian centre at Kerepesi út 7 in Józsefváros, Budapest, Hungary. The Kerepesi Road institution originated in the late 1870s as a horse market, exhibition and auction complex and subsequently developed into an important centre of Hungarian equestrian sport.

The site is distinct from the original Nemzeti Lovarda, a riding hall designed by Miklós Ybl which opened in Ötpacsirta Street behind the Hungarian National Museum in 1858 and was demolished in 1948. After the older building disappeared, the Kerepesi Road Tattersall began to inherit the name Nemzeti Lovarda during the 1960s; the name first appeared officially for the institution in 1988.

The Tattersall was also used during the Holocaust in Hungary. Following the Arrow Cross Party takeover in October 1944, Jews rounded up in Budapest were detained at the site. Survivor testimony describes large numbers of Jews being marched there under armed guard, held in poor conditions and subjected to violence. The site subsequently formed part of the system of collection points used during forced-labour mobilisation and deportations from Budapest under Arrow Cross rule.

The surviving main building was constructed in 1932 to designs by Ferenc Paulheim Jr. and is protected as a historic monument. The complex underwent a major reconstruction between 2016 and 2018 and reopened on 24 February 2018.

== Name and the earlier Nemzeti Lovarda ==
The name Nemzeti Lovarda originally referred to a different Budapest institution.

The earlier National Riding Hall was built for the Nemzeti Lovaregylet on a site in Ötpacsirta Street, now Pollack Mihály tér 8, behind the Hungarian National Museum. Construction began on 26 June 1857 according to plans by Miklós Ybl, with József Diescher as contractor. The riding hall opened on 7 January 1858.

Ybl's complex contained a large riding arena, stables, a shooting gallery, accommodation for staff and social rooms overlooking the arena. A statue of a rearing horse by sculptor Anton Dominik Fernkorn was subsequently installed on its façade.

The building was damaged during the Second World War. It was demolished in 1948 to enlarge the grounds associated with the neighbouring Esterházy Palace, which was then being used as the presidential residence. An underground Hungarian Radio facility was later constructed on part of the site.

Meanwhile, the Kerepesi Road Tattersall had existed independently since the late nineteenth century. The two institutions therefore operated simultaneously for approximately seventy years and should not be regarded as a single riding hall which physically moved from Ötpacsirta Street to Kerepesi Road.

Following the destruction of Ybl's riding hall, the Kerepesi Road complex began to be called the Nemzeti Lovarda during the 1960s. According to the venue's institutional history, the name was first incorporated into its official title in 1988.

== Origins of the Tattersall ==
The origins of the Kerepesi Road complex lay in the rapid development of Budapest after the unification of Buda, Pest and Óbuda in 1873. Horses remained important for urban transport, agriculture and the military, while horse breeding and trading were significant economic activities.

In 1877 the Lótenyésztés Emelésére Alakult Részvénytársaság ("Joint Stock Company for the Advancement of Horse Breeding") was formed to promote Hungarian horse breeding by organising fairs, exhibitions, auctions and competitions.

The company reached an agreement with the Budapest municipal authorities to use the former municipal omnibus depot beside Külső-Kerepesi Road as a horse market. The site lay near what became Budapest Keleti railway station.

The first major horse exhibition and auction at the site was held in 1878. Emperor Franz Joseph and Empress Elisabeth attended its opening.

Because the activities undertaken there resembled the horse-sales establishments associated with the English auctioneer and horse dealer Richard Tattersall, Budapest residents began referring to the complex simply as the Tattersall. Richard Tattersall had no direct connection with the Budapest establishment; his surname had become a generic name for similar horse-auction and boarding establishments elsewhere in Europe.

== Development of equestrian sport ==
The Tattersall gradually developed beyond its original role as a market and auction site.

A permanent trotting track was established there by 1883. From 1894 the complex hosted organised equestrian competitions which included dressage, show jumping and ribbon-catching events.

In 1914 the Budapesti Lovassport Egyesület (Budapest Equestrian Sports Association) was established at the Tattersall. The venue's history describes it as the first Hungarian organisation formed specifically for sport riding and the organisation of equestrian competitions.

Horse trading, breeding activities, recreational riding and competitive equestrian sport subsequently operated alongside one another at the complex.

== Interwar redevelopment ==
The site was extensively reorganised in the early 1930s following plans to develop a modern Budapest trotting stadium on part of the Tattersall land.

In 1931 the Budapest municipal authorities agreed that approximately two-thirds of the property could be used by the Budapest Trotting Association for its new racecourse. As part of the arrangement, the remaining Tattersall was to receive reconstructed stables and a new covered riding arena.

Architect Ferenc Paulheim Jr. designed the equestrian buildings. The new covered arena opened in 1932. It measured approximately 40 by 90 metres and could accommodate about 1,000 spectators. Twenty stable blocks provided accommodation for approximately 308 horses.

The adjacent modern trotting stadium opened in 1933. Although historically developed from part of the former Tattersall grounds, the trotting course subsequently functioned separately from the riding centre.

Hungary's first permanent outdoor show-jumping arena was established at the Tattersall in 1939.

The surviving 1932 main building later became known as the Kóbli. Hungarian heritage legislation placed it under national monument protection in 2011, identifying it as a modern-style building designed by Paulheim whose architectural value warranted preservation.

== Holocaust and Arrow Cross rule ==
After the German occupation of Hungary in March 1944, hundreds of thousands of Hungarian Jews outside Budapest were deported, primarily to Auschwitz. Most of Budapest's remaining Jewish population was concentrated in designated yellow-star houses during the summer.

Following the unsuccessful attempt by Regent Miklós Horthy to withdraw Hungary from the war, the German-backed Arrow Cross Party seized power on 15–16 October 1944. Arrow Cross groups began roundups and violent attacks against Jews in the capital.

During these events, Jews from Józsefváros and neighbouring parts of Budapest were forced from their homes and driven to the Tattersall under armed guard.

A wartime memoir by Mrs. Aurél Kincs, subsequently published by the Hungarian National Archives, records that the detainees were guarded by armed Arrow Cross members, subjected to beatings and held with inadequate food and water. On 17 October, she recorded that Jews continued to arrive at the Tattersall "by the hundreds".

Her account describes prisoners sleeping in the grandstand and in the open, beatings with rifle butts and severe overcrowding. The detainees included elderly people, children and families.

Many Jews detained during the initial October roundup were released after several days and allowed to return to their homes. Historian Barbara Papp notes that a number of survivor accounts describe Jews being driven to the Tattersall in mid-October as an Arrow Cross demonstration of power and then being released after a short period.

The site's role was not limited to the first mass roundup. During the following weeks the Tattersall was used as a collection point during the Arrow Cross persecution of Budapest's Jewish population. Historian Áron Máthé has described it as a staging area for deportations during the period of Arrow Cross rule.

Accounts preserved by the Hungarian National Archives also document the wider sequence through which Jews were moved between Budapest collection sites, including the Tattersall and the KISOK sports ground, before forced marches towards western Hungary and Hegyeshalom on the Austrian frontier.

The Tattersall is therefore described in historical sources both as a site of temporary mass detention and as part of the network of collection and transit sites used during the persecution, forced-labour mobilisation and deportation of Budapest Jews in the final months of 1944.

== Second World War damage ==
The Tattersall was damaged during the Siege of Budapest in the winter of 1944–1945. Buildings and riding grounds were damaged, while horses were killed, removed or dispersed.

After the fighting, debris was cleared and some of the facilities were repaired, allowing equestrian activity to resume.

The neighbouring trotting course also survived the war and continued functioning separately for several decades. Trotting races were last held there in 2004; racing subsequently transferred to Kincsem Park, while much of the former trotting-course site was redeveloped.

== Post-war period ==
During the early communist period the Tattersall passed through the control of several state organisations.

Although the large 1932 covered riding arena was repaired after the Second World War, it was closed and demolished in 1952. The surviving end section and main building—the Kóbli—remained standing.

In 1956 the complex came under the supervision of the Ministry of Agriculture as the sport stables of the National Horse Breeding Inspectorate. Its functions included training and testing horses, organising equestrian competitions and operating a riding establishment.

After the demolition of the original Ybl-designed Nemzeti Lovarda, the name began to be applied to the Kerepesi Road complex in the 1960s, although Tattersall remained in common use.

A new indoor riding hall with adjoining stables and changing facilities was completed in 1985.

In 1988 the Ministry of Agriculture transferred the Tattersall to the University of Veterinary Science as a legally independent equestrian teaching facility. According to the institution's history, this was the point at which Nemzeti Lovarda first became part of its official name. Its functions expanded to include teaching and research connected with horses and equestrianism.

Later developments included veterinary facilities, an education centre, farriery training, equine reproductive services and further reconstruction of its riding and competition areas.

== Threatened closure and preservation ==
By the early 2000s the future of the complex had become uncertain as public funding declined and redevelopment transformed neighbouring parts of the former Tattersall and trotting grounds.

The institution's history records that by 2006 the Nemzeti Lovarda faced the possibility of closure. A campaign by members of the Hungarian equestrian community sought to preserve the Kerepesi Road site for equestrian use.

The Nemzeti Lovardáért Alapítvány (Foundation for the National Riding Hall) became involved in efforts to maintain the complex. The facility subsequently continued operating rather than being cleared for redevelopment.

When the reconstructed venue reopened in 2018, contemporary reports recalled that demolition of the site had appeared possible in 2006 and credited the campaign by equestrian organisations with helping to preserve it.

== 2016–2018 reconstruction ==
The Nemzeti Lovarda closed after an international show-jumping event in July 2016 to allow a comprehensive reconstruction of the complex.

The project retained and restored the historic 1932 main building while rebuilding or modernising much of the wider equestrian complex.

The approximately 3.2 billion forint redevelopment produced a 4.5-hectare (11-acre) equestrian centre consisting of seven groups of buildings with approximately 8,800 square metres (95,000 sq ft) of floor space.

The rebuilt facilities included:

- two indoor riding arenas;
- an all-weather outdoor competition arena;
- a show-jumping arena and practice area;
- four paddocks;
- accommodation for 176 horses;
- horse-walking and lunging facilities;
- a veterinary treatment room;
- offices, storage and changing facilities; and
- conference and educational spaces.

The renovated Nemzeti Lovarda was formally inaugurated on 24 February 2018.

== Architecture ==
The principal historic building at Kerepesi út 7 is the surviving portion of Ferenc Paulheim Jr.'s 1932 equestrian complex.

The original covered arena was approximately 40 metres (130 ft) wide, 90 metres (300 ft) long and 16 metres (52 ft) high. Its large roof was supported by timber lattice structures spanning the riding area without intermediate columns. The arena could accommodate approximately 1,000 spectators.

Most of the covered arena was destroyed in 1952, leaving the main/end section known as the Kóbli.

In 2011 the Hungarian government declared the main building at Kerepesi út 7 a protected monument. The designation identified it as a modern-style building constructed in 1932 according to Paulheim's designs and protected its architectural value.

The 2016–2018 reconstruction incorporated the historic building into the new equestrian complex rather than replacing it.

== Current use ==
The Nemzeti Lovarda continues to operate as an equestrian training, competition and recreational riding centre.

The site hosts national and international equestrian competitions and provides training facilities, riding instruction and stabling.

The complex is operated by N.L. Sportlétesítmény Nonprofit Kft. and remains at Kerepesi út 7 in Budapest's eighth district.

== See also ==
- Equestrianism
- Kincsem Park
- Miklós Ybl
- Holocaust in Hungary
- Arrow Cross Party
- Siege of Budapest
- Józsefváros
