= Statue of Lord Byron =

Bronze statue in Hyde Park, London

Coordinates: 51.511361°N 0.173153°W

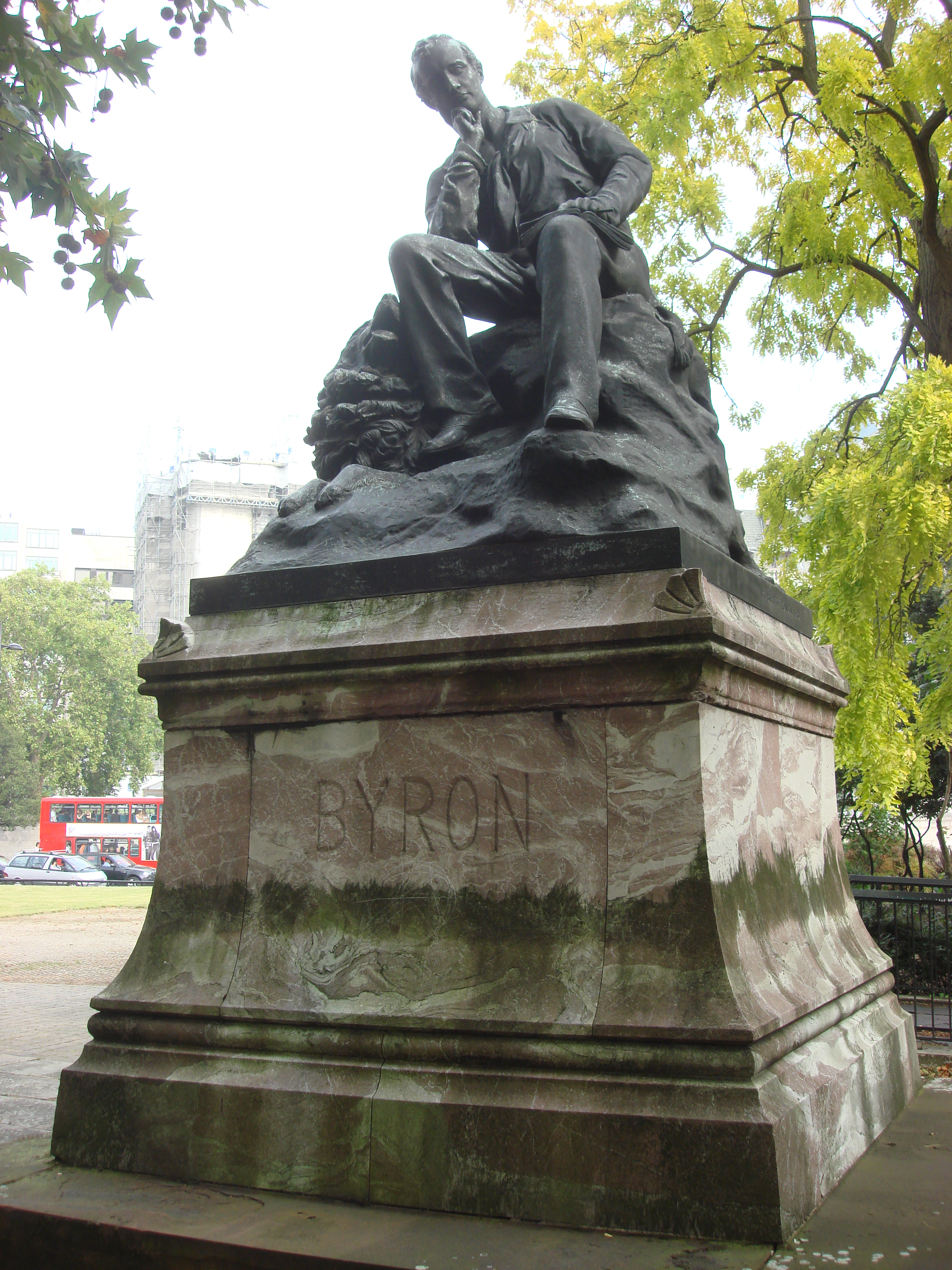
- Artist: Richard Claude Belt
- Completion date: 1880
- Subject: Lord Byron
- Location: London

Listed Building – Grade II
- Official name: Statue of Lord Byron
- Designated: 14 January 1970
- Reference no.: 1277504

A statue of Lord Byron is situated at Hyde Park Corner in London. It was made of bronze to the design of Richard Claude Belt and sits upon a marble plinth. The marble used to make the plinth was given as a gift by the people of Greece for Byron's participation in the Greek War of Independence.

The monument is Grade II listed, and commemorates the romantic poet and writer Lord Byron. He sits in a meditative pose alongside his Landseer dog Boatswain. The statue is said to poorly resemble Byron and is sometimes regarded as the "worst statue in London".

== History ==
Commemoration of Byron after his death was occasionally controversial, with a burial at Westminster Abbey being refused by Dean Ireland. It was not until 1875, more than five decades after the poet's death, that Benjamin Disraeli as Prime Minister called for the creation of a memorial.

There was also controversy surrounding the extent of Belt's involvement in the creation of the statue, with a junior sculptor of Belt's studio claiming to have done significant uncredited work on its sculpting. A publication to such an effect by Charles Lawes in Vanity Fair would see Belt succeeding in suing him for libel.

In 2024, the Byron Society aimed to move the statue into Hyde Park from its island in the centre of Park Lane. Before the widening of the latter it was not separated from the main area of the park. As of August 2026, the statue now resides in its new location in Hyde Park.
