= Charles Bressey =

English civil engineer and surveyor

Sir Charles Bressey
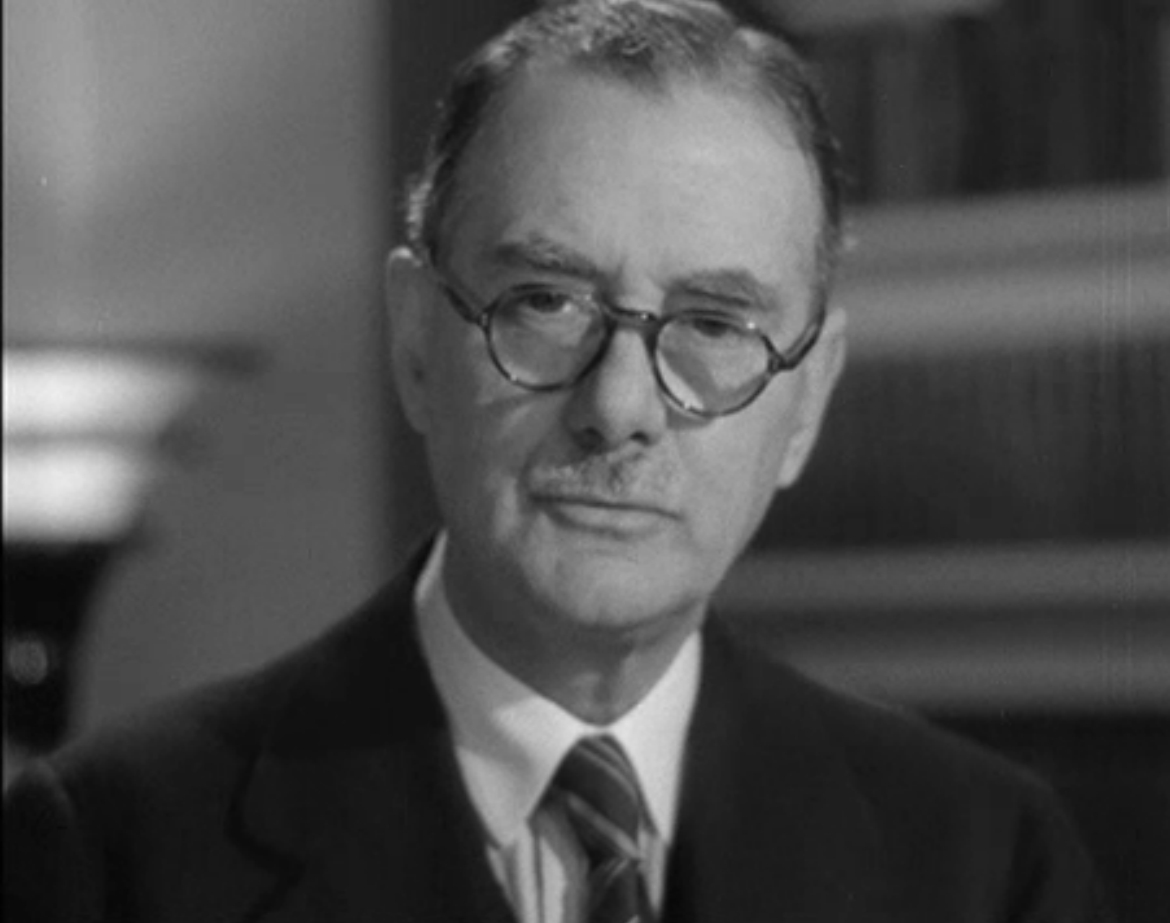
- Born: 3 January 1874; Wanstead, Essex
- Died: 14 April 1951 (aged 77); Sawbridgeworth, Hertfordshire
- Occupations: Civil Engineer, Surveyor
- Title: Chief Engineer for Roads, Ministry of Transport, 1921-1938; President of the Institution of Chartered Surveyors, 1938-9

Sir Charles Herbert Bressey, CB, CBE (3 January 1874 – 14 April 1951) was an English civil engineer and surveyor who specialised in road design. Bressey was Chief Engineer for Roads at the Ministry of Transport from 1921 to 1938. Between 1935 and 1938 he carried out research on road planning and motorway design in preparation for his Highway Development Survey, 1937 for Greater London published in 1938. He served as President of the Institution of Chartered Surveyors in 1938–39.

== Early life ==
Bressey was born in Wanstead, Essex (now in the London Borough of Redbridge), the son of architect John Thomas Bressey and Elizabeth Bressey (née Farrow). He was educated at Forest School, Walthamstow and in France and Germany before starting work in his father's practice in the City of London, becoming a partner in 1896. When his father retired, he succeeded him as surveyor to the Wanstead Urban District and continued the practice.

Bressey married Margeret Francis Hill in 1902 and the couple had two sons.

== Later career ==
At the start of World War I, Bressey was commissioned into the Royal Engineers and spent time in France and Flanders constructing military roads. In 1916 he became a staff officer in the army's roads directorate, eventually holding the position of assistant director of Roads and attaining the rank of Lieutenant-Colonel before he left the army in November 1919. For his war service, he was appointed an Officer of the Order of the British Empire (OBE), and received the Croix de Chevalier of the French Légion d'honneur.

When the Ministry of Transport was created in 1919, Sir Henry Maybury, Director-General of Roads, appointed Bressey as the Divisional Road Engineer for the London area. Bressey became Chief Engineer for Roads in 1921 and succeeded Maybury in 1928 (although Maybury's post was abolished and Bressey retained his existing title of Chief Engineer). In the 1924 Birthday Honours, Bressey was promoted to Commander of the Order of the British Empire (CBE). He was appointed a Companion of the Bath (CB) in June 1930.

In January 1935, Bressey was given a knighthood, and, Minister of Transport Leslie Hore-Belisha, appointed him to prepare a report on London's future road transport requirements up to the mid-1960s. Bressey spent three years consulting with experts and interested parties and investigating European plans. He was assisted by architect Sir Edwin Lutyens. The final report, The Highway Development Survey, 1937 for Greater London, was published on 16 May 1938 and proposed a series of high capacity motorways radiating outwards from the city and made recommendations for a series of circular routes around the capital. Although World War II delayed the implementation of any of Bressey's and Lutyens' recommendations, they subsequently featured in a number of post war reports such as Sir Patrick Abercrombie's County of London Plan and the Greater London Council's 1960s London Ringways scheme.

Bressey retired from the Ministry of Transport following the publication of the report. In 1938, he received an honorary doctorate from London University and acted as President of the Institution of Chartered Surveyors (1938–1939). He was a member of several industry bodies including the Royal Town Planning Institute, the Royal Sanitary Institute and Chartered Institute of Transport.

Bressey died at a nursing home in Sawbridgeworth, Hertfordshire on 14 April 1951 from a cerebral haemorrhage and arteriosclerosis.
