= William Tattersall =

English footballer

Personal information
- Full name: William Tattersall
- Place of birth: England
- Position: Full back

Senior career*
Years	Team	Apps	(Gls)
- Heywood
1894–1896	Burnley	5	(0)
- Nelson
- * Club domestic league appearances and goals

William Tattersall was an English professional footballer who played as a full back. He played five matches in the Football League First Division for Burnley.
