= Hyde Park Corner =

Road junction in London, England

Coordinates: 51°30′10″N 0°9′4.5″W

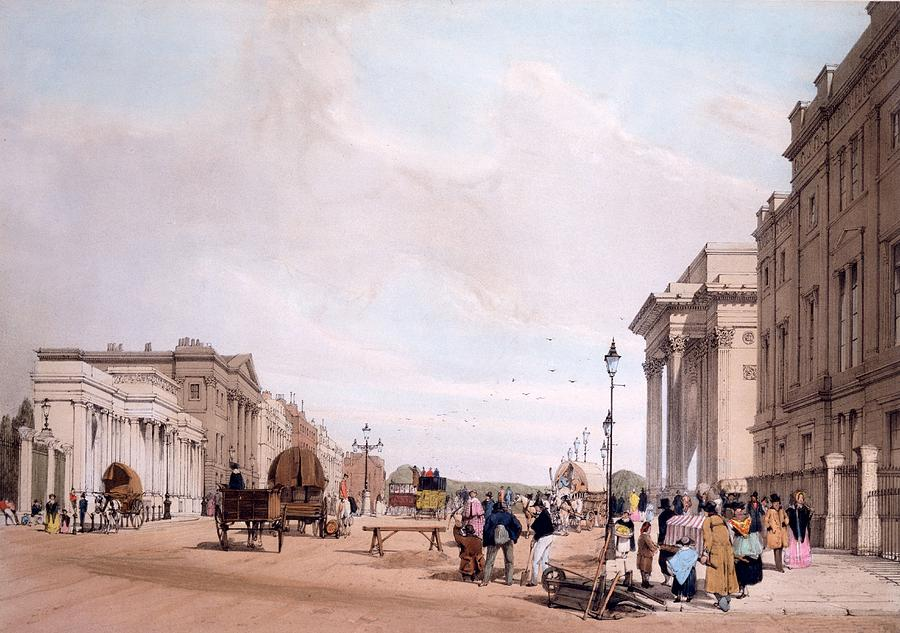
Hyde Park Corner in 1842, looking east towards Piccadilly. On the left is Decimus Burton's Ionic Screen with Apsley House beyond. On the right is St George's Hospital with the Wellington Arch on the far side of Grosvenor Place.

Hyde Park Corner is between Knightsbridge, Belgravia and Mayfair in London, England. It primarily refers to a major road junction at the south-eastern corner of Hyde Park. Until 1883, it was a T-junction where Piccadilly (east) and Knightsbridge (west) met Grosvenor Place (south).

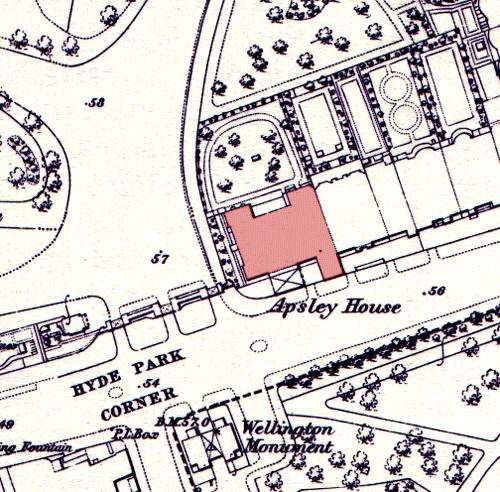
Hyde Park Corner and Apsley House (pink) on an 1869 Ordnance Survey Map

In the 1820s, King George IV initiated the renovation of the Royal Parks in London and the creation of a ceremonial approach to Buckingham Palace. The architect Decimus Burton was commissioned to design the route and the monuments at Hyde Park Corner. These honoured the Duke of Wellington, hero of the Napoleonic Wars, who lived at Apsley House.

Burton's plan was for an Ionic screen (columned gateway) on the north side of the junction and a triumphal arch on its south side, across the entrance to Green Park and the Constitution Hill pathway. An existing carriage drive led round a bend and down Constitution Hill to the Mall and Buckingham Palace, where Nash's Marble Arch was to mark the entrance.

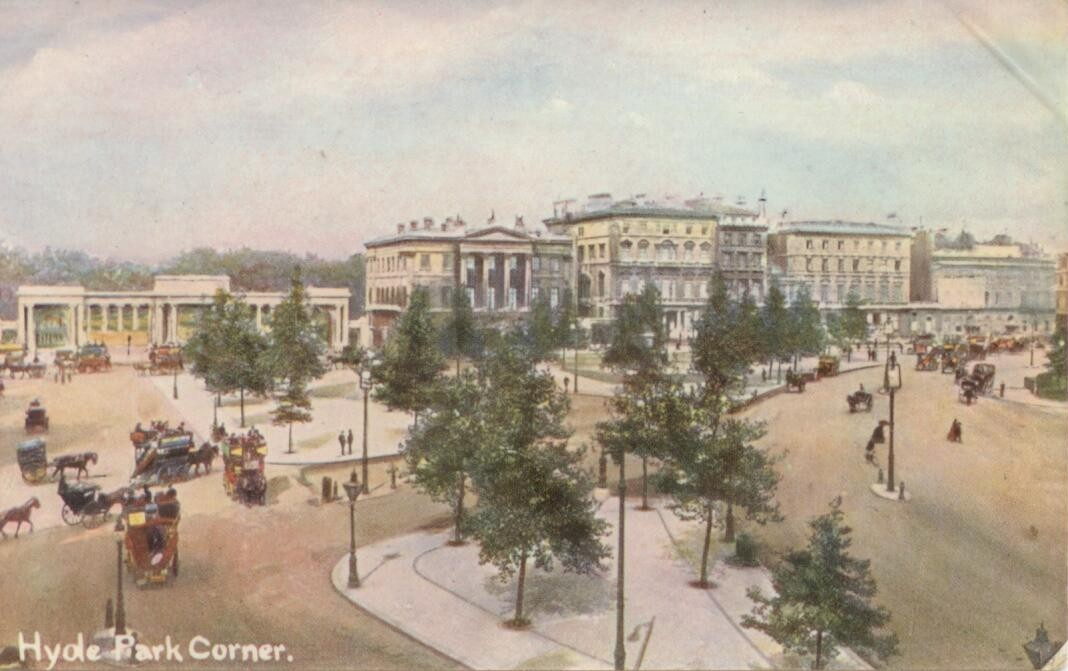
Hyde Park Corner from the south-west c.1905; Wellington Arch by this time is moved off to the right

Traffic congestion at the junction led to its expansion, first in the 1880s, which moved the triumphal arch a short distance to stand above Constitution Hill and then in the 1960s, taking land from Green Park and the gardens of Buckingham Palace. This gave it its present form of a large rectangular roundabout with, at its centre, a ceremonial route and green space with many monuments. This was proposed in 1937 by the civil engineer Sir Charles Bressey and the architect Sir Edwin Lutyens.

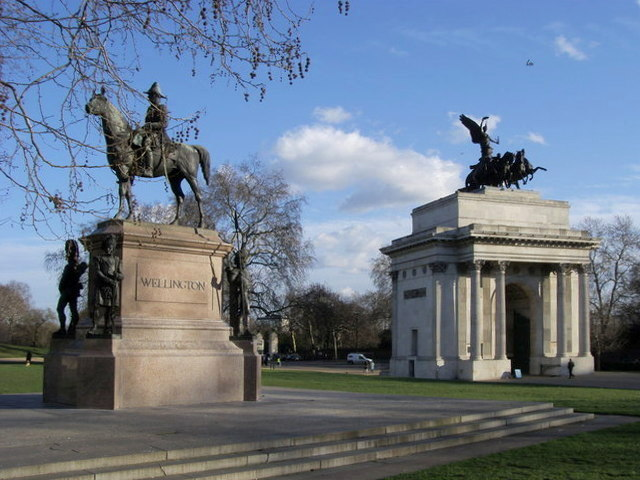
Decimus Burton's Wellington Arch and Boehm's Statue of Wellington at Hyde Park Corner, 2008

Dominating the space within the roundabout is the Wellington Arch, a huge triumphal arch surmounted by a sculpture, Peace descending on the Quadriga of War. When the roundabout was built, an underpass was created to take the east–west traffic between Piccadilly and Knightsbridge.

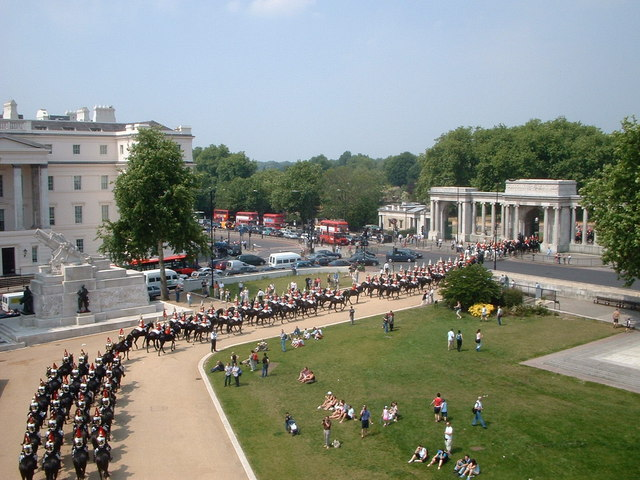
Rehearsal for Trooping the Colour passing through Hyde Park Corner, 2003

Through all the changes, the ceremonial route, now closed to traffic, has remained in use, complicating design of the junction. Mounted cavalry based at Hyde Park Barracks still pass through the Ionic screen and Wellington Arch to Constitution Hill on their way to Buckingham Palace.

== History ==
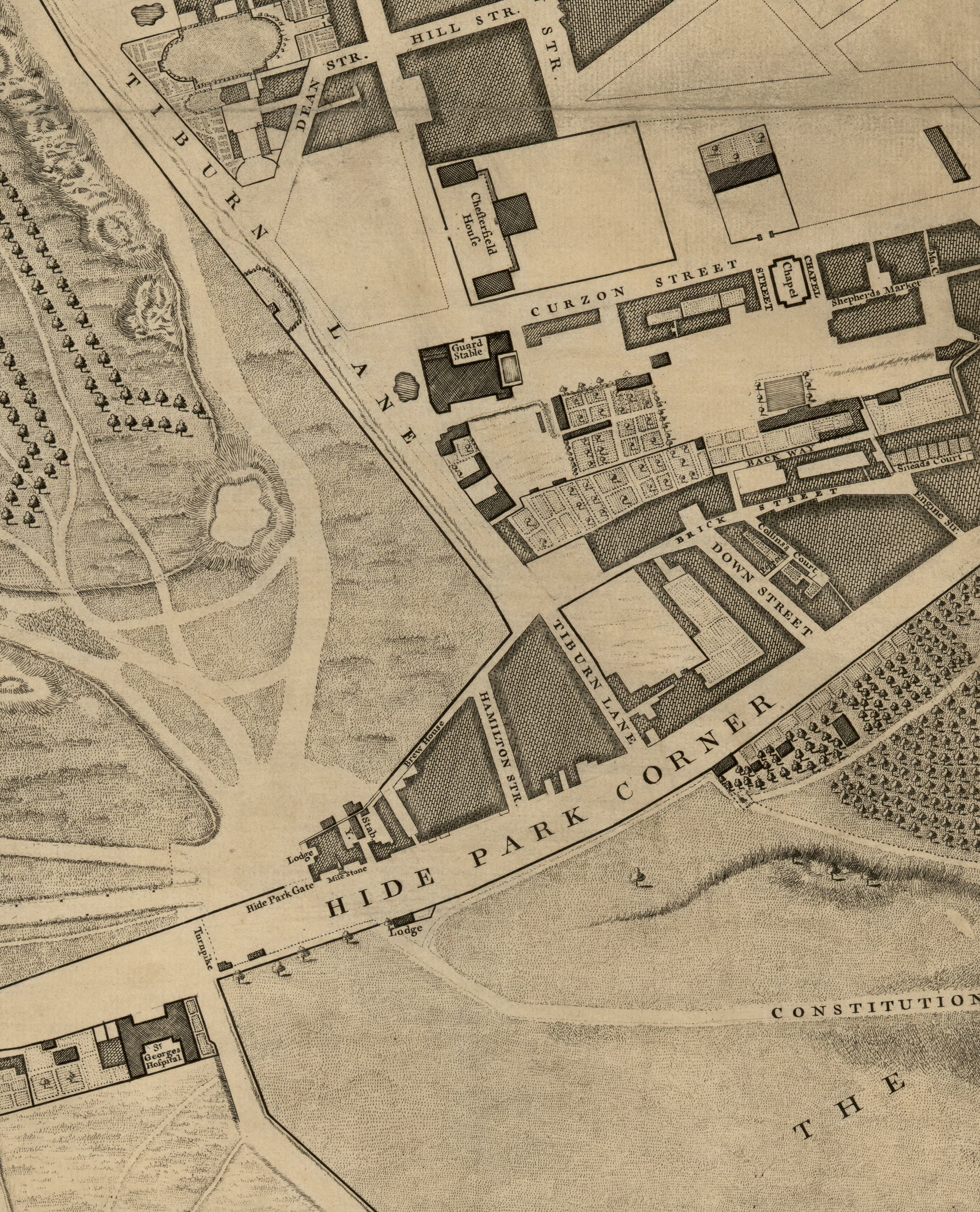
Hyde Park Corner from John Rocque's map of 1746

The road to London from the west of England runs through Reading and Hounslow, reaching the centre along Piccadilly. Until 1825 there was a turnpike gate at Hyde Park Corner, between Grosvenor Place and Apsley House.

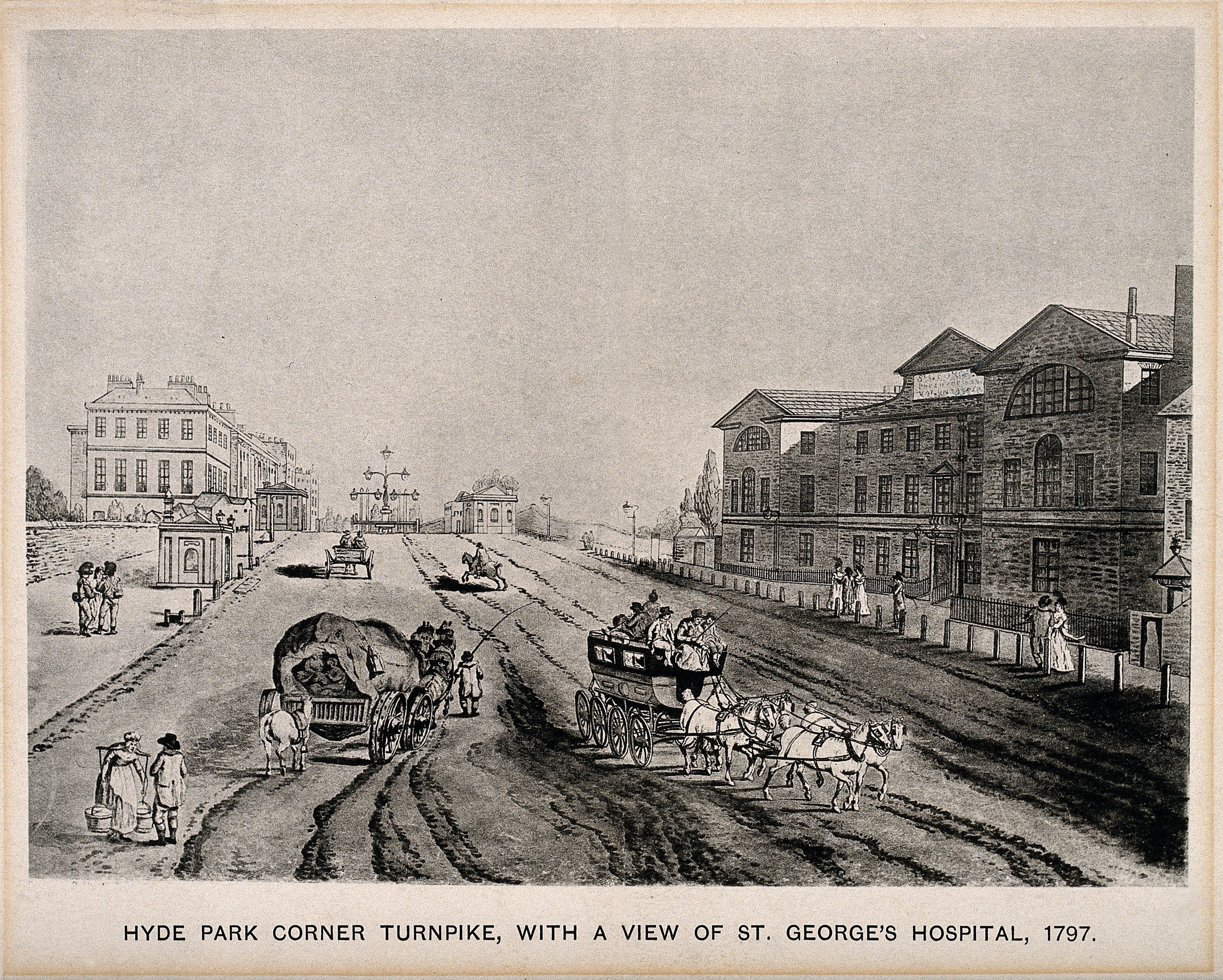
Hyde Park Corner in 1797, looking east. The original St George's Hospital is on the right. Apsley House is on the left, before Wyatt's changes in the 1820s.

Burton's original design for the arch was rejected because it was not sufficiently ostentatious. He created a new, much larger design which was built, but a moratorium in 1828 on public building work left it without its intended sculpture. A public subscription was opened in 1837 for a colossal equestrian statue of Wellington to be placed on top of the arch. This was successful but the statue proved controversial. Over Burton's vehement objections, the statue was placed on the arch in 1846.

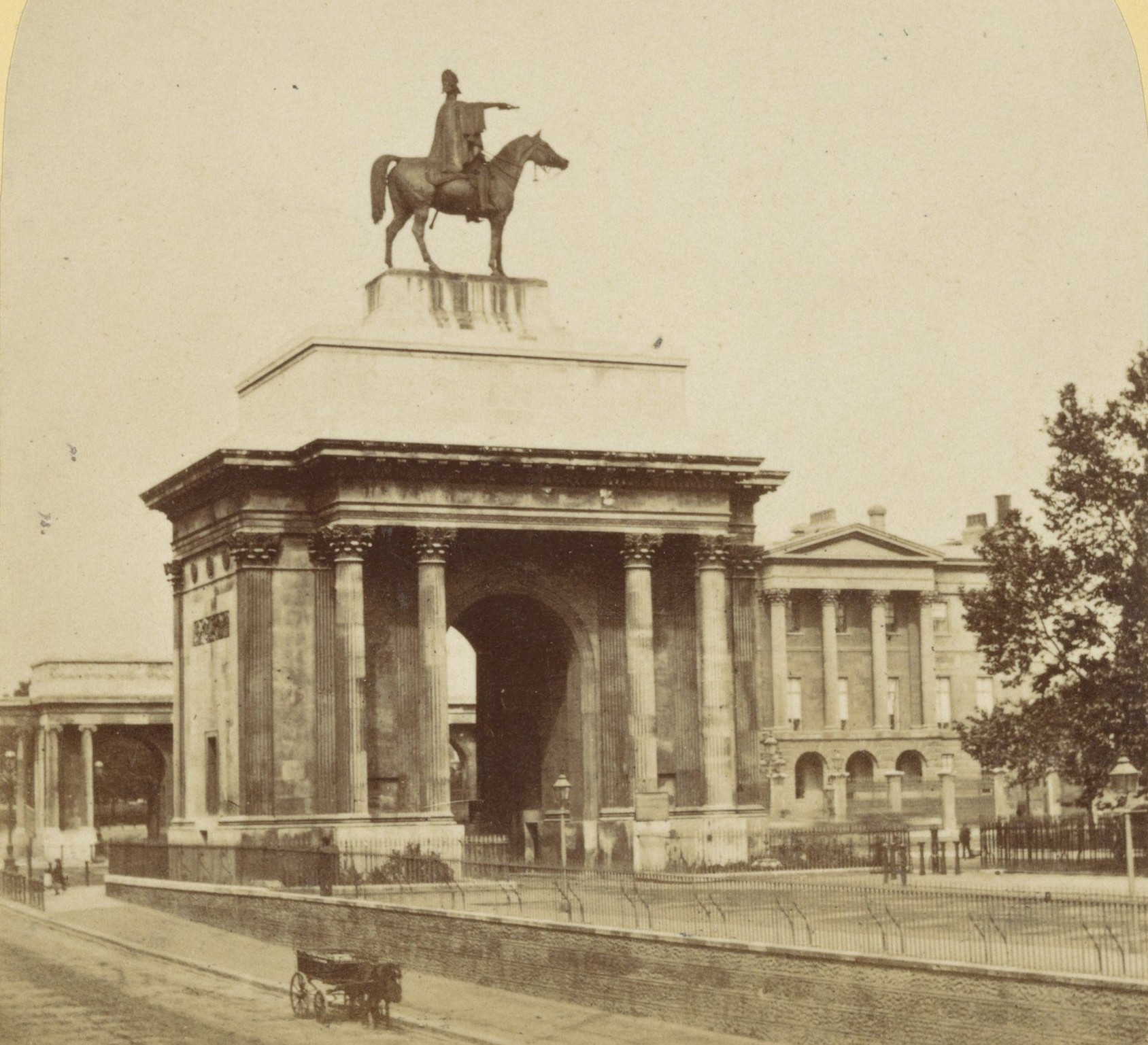
View from the south of Wellington Arch in its original position surmounted by Matthew Cotes Wyatt's Equestrian Statue of Wellington

By the 1880s, congestion at the T-junction led to demands for its expansion. This inevitably meant rebuilding the Wellington Arch, as it hemmed in two of the roads which met at the junction. In 1882–83 the junction became essentially triangular, with the edges being Piccadilly, Grosvenor Place and, as the hypotenuse, a new road, Duke of Wellington Place, which connected Grosvenor Crescent to Piccadilly opposite Hamilton Place.

Wellington Arch was rebuilt facing west as the grand entrance to Constitution Hill. Matthew Cotes Wyatt's equestrian statue was found a new home in Aldershot. A smaller equestrian statue of Wellington by Joseph Boehm was erected in 1888.

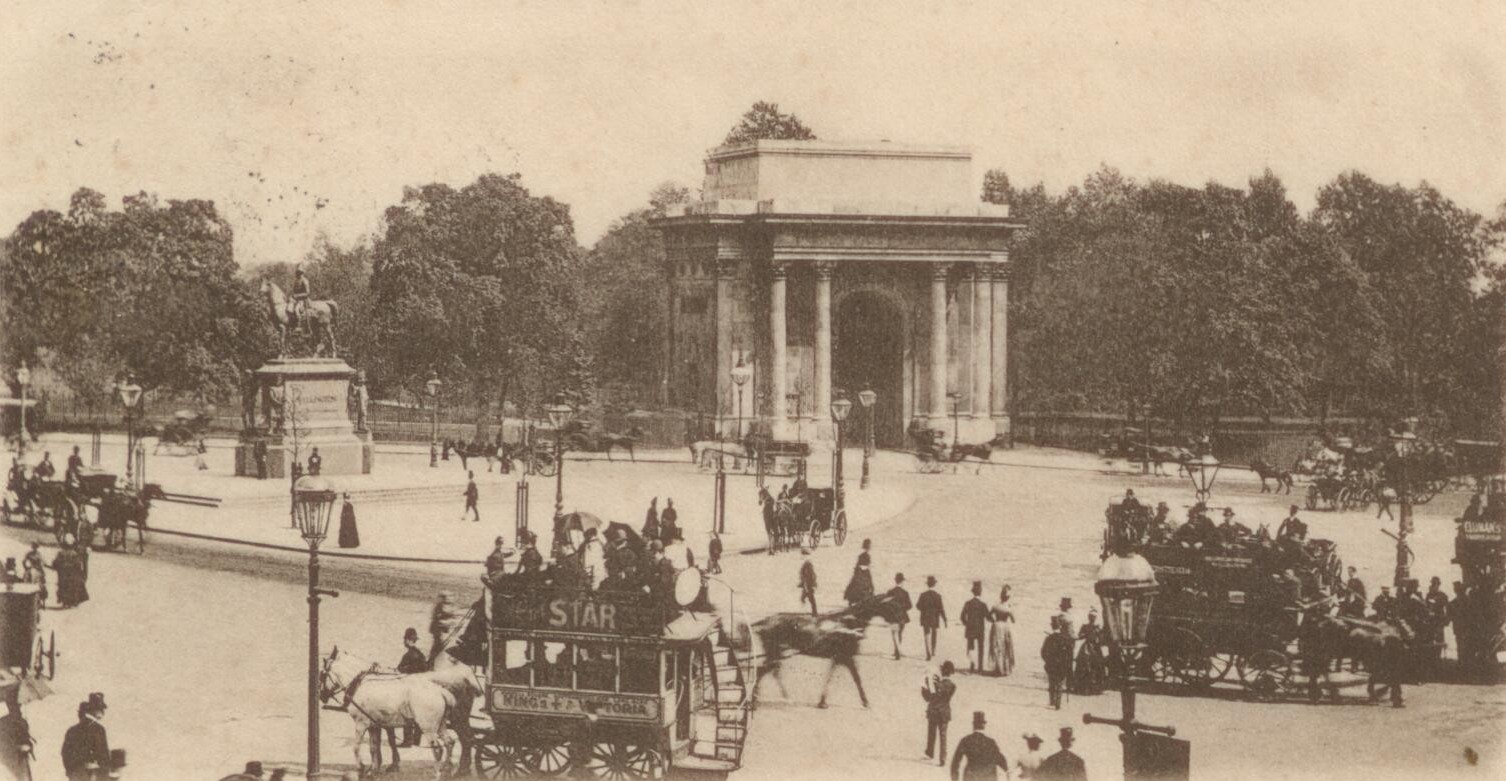
Wellington Statue and Arch at Hyde Park Corner from the Ionic Screen, 1900. The Arch has been repositioned from its original location, with the equestrian statue removed.

Four public roads (Piccadilly, Knightsbridge, Grosvenor Place and Grosvenor Crescent) met at the enlarged junction and there were two gated accesses to carriage drives: north into Hyde Park; and east down Constitution Hill. The carriage drives were used as roads, but Hyde Park was closed overnight and Constitution Hill on Sundays. A roadway across the junction connecting the Ionic screen to Wellington Arch maintained the ceremonial route, with large traffic islands between the roadways.

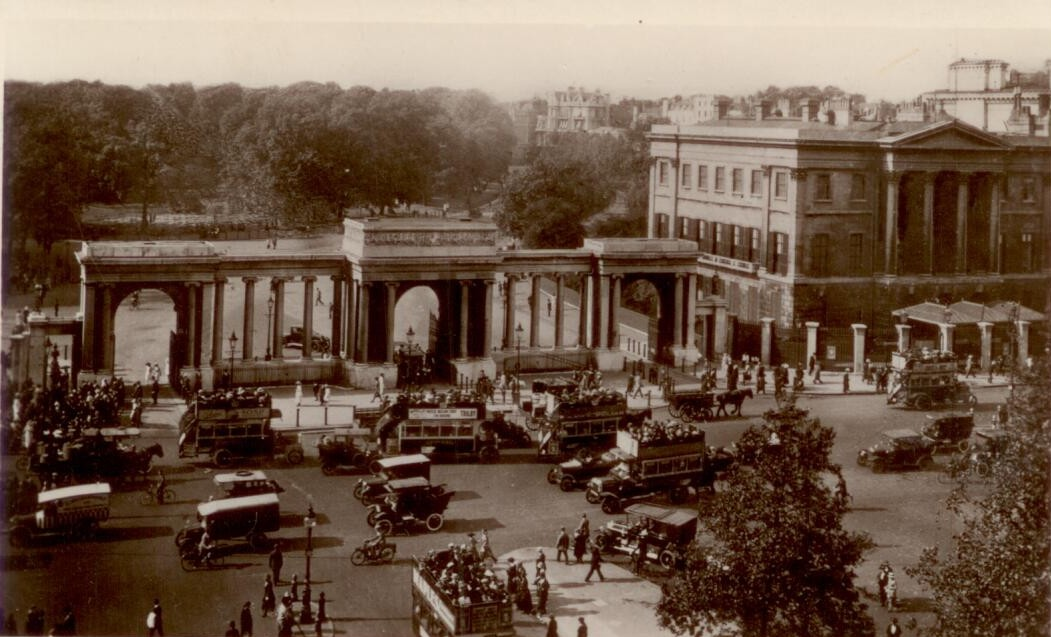
Heavy traffic in front of Ionic Screen under control of police before introduction of gyratory flow in 1926

By the 1920s, congestion was again causing problems. In 1926 Hyde Park Corner was one of the first sites in London to have "gyratory traffic control", i.e. a one-way system, with traffic flowing clockwise. The roadways remained unchanged, but that across the junction for the ceremonial route ceased to be used by vehicles. At busy times the junction continued to be controlled by police on point duty. Traffic signals were installed in the 1930s.

In 1938 Sir Charles Bressey and Sir Edwin Lutyens proposed that the junction be converted to a large roundabout. Its "rectangular island, with its grass and trees, would form an admirable setting for monuments new and old". Bressey also proposed that Park Lane become the southbound carriageway and the East Carriage Drive the northbound carriageway of "a handsome and spacious boulevard".

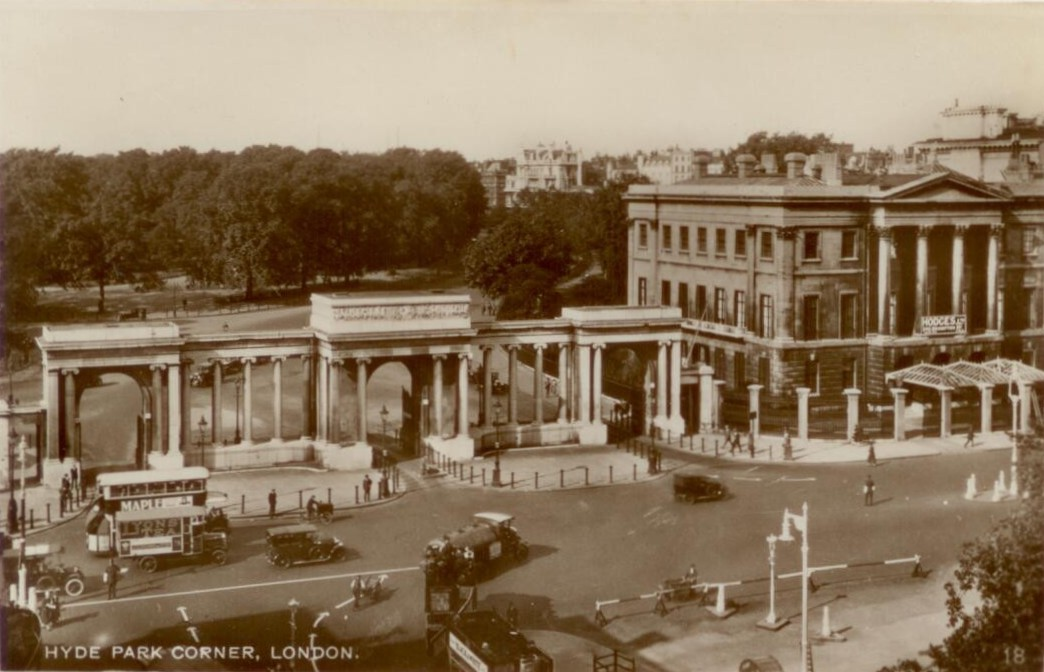
Traffic under control of police at Ionic Screen after introduction of gyratory flow and arrow road markings. A removable barrier on the right blocks the ceremonial route across the junction. 1927 or 1928

Bressey's and Lutyens' plans were implemented between 1960 and 1962, along with an underpass between Piccadilly and Knightsbridge. Wellington Arch was left where it was and more land was taken from Green Park and the garden of Buckingham Palace to form the roundabout.

The ceremonial route now passes across the centre of the roundabout. Traffic lights are used to control flows round the roundabout and also to allow pedestrians (and cavalry from Hyde Park Barracks) to pass to and from the central area; there are also pedestrian underpasses. Hyde Park Corner tube station, served by the Piccadilly line, is at the north-west corner of the junction.

== Improvements by Decimus Burton ==
During the second half of the 1820s, the Commissioners of Woods and Forests and King George IV resolved that Hyde Park, and the area around it, must be renovated to the extent of the splendour of rival European capital cities, and that the essence of the new arrangement would be a triumphal approach to Buckingham Palace, which had recently been completed.

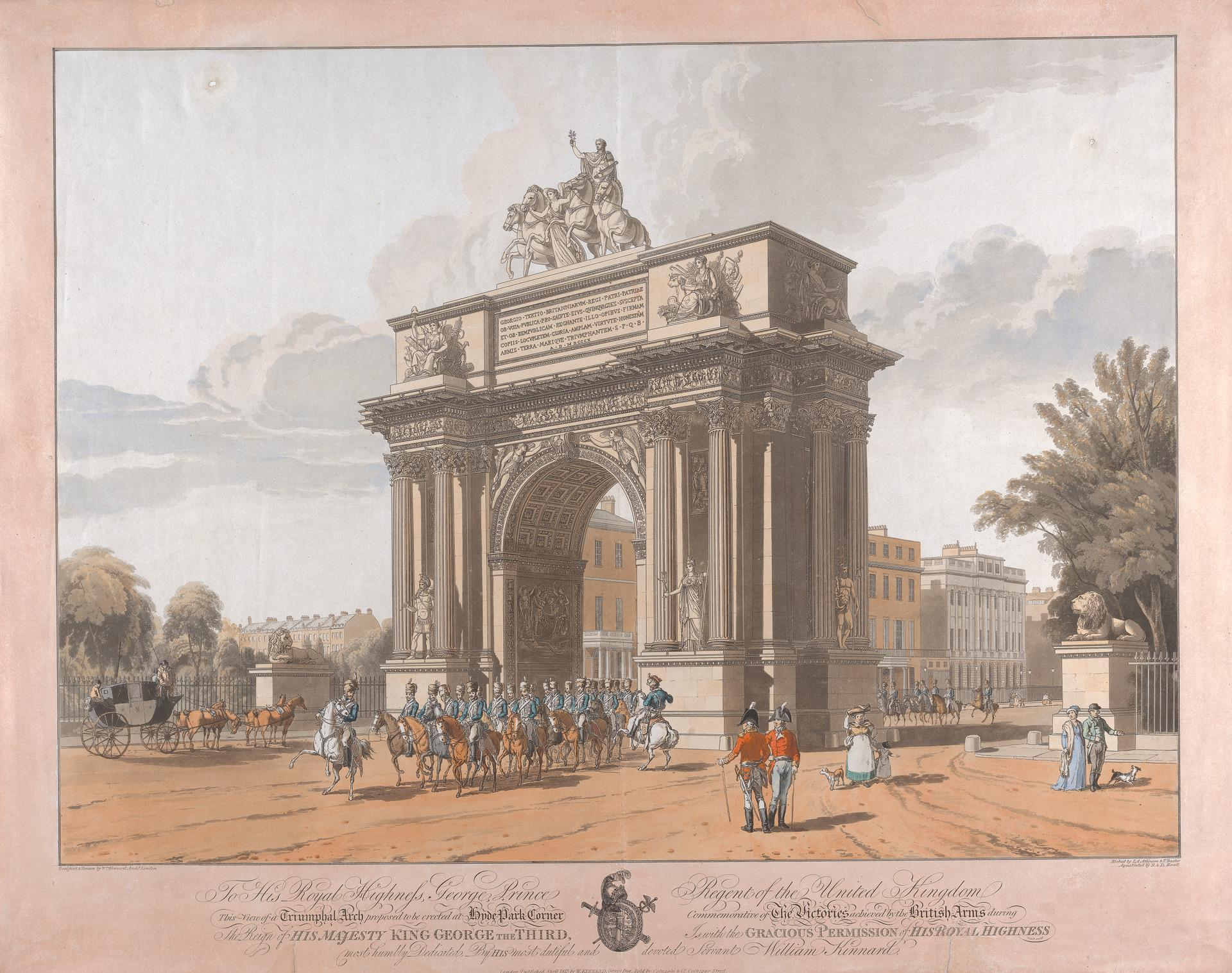
1813 proposal by William Kinnard for a triumphal arch across Piccadilly at Hyde Park Corner. Apsley House can be seen through the arch.

Even before the Battle of Waterloo had been fought, there were proposals for a triumphal arch at Hyde Park Corner. One, by the architect William Kinnard, was remarkably similar to the final form which the Wellington Arch was to reach 100 years later.

The project committee, led by the Prime Minister, Lord Liverpool, and advised by Charles Arbuthnot, President of the Board of Commissioners of Woods and Forests, selected Decimus Burton as the project's architect. In 1828, when giving evidence to a Parliamentary Select Committee, Arbuthnot explained that he had nominated Burton 'having seen in the Regent's Park, and elsewhere, works which pleased my eye, from their architectural beauty and correctness'. Burton intended to create an urban space dedicated to the celebration of the House of Hanover, national pride, and the nation's heroes. The renovation of Hyde Park, Green Park, and St James's Park began in 1825 with the demarcation of new drives and pathways. Burton designed new lodges and gates ― Cumberland Gate, Stanhope Gate, Grosvenor Gate, the Hyde Park Gate/Screen at Hyde Park Corner, and later the Prince of Wales's Gate, Knightsbridge ― in the classical style. There were no authoritative precedents in the classical style for such buildings, which required windows and chimney stacks. In the words of Guy Williams, 'Burton's reticent treatment of the supernumerary features' and of the cast iron gates and railings, was 'greatly admired'.

At Hyde Park Corner, the King required 'some great ceremonial outwork that would be worthy of the new palace that lay to its rear'. He accepted Burton's proposal for a sequence in which those approaching from the north would pass first through the screen, then through a triumphal arch, before turning left to descend Constitution Hill and enter the forecourt of Buckingham Palace through John Nash's Marble Arch.

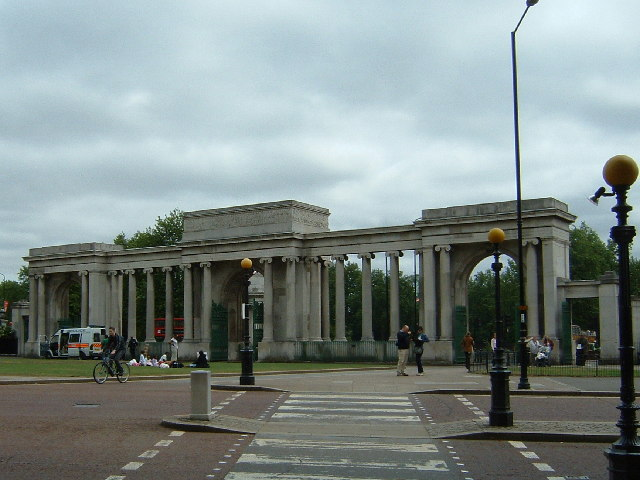
Ionic Screen at Hyde Park Corner, 2005

Burton's Ionic Screen delighted the king and his Committee. They rejected his first design for the triumphal arch, which was modelled on the Arch of Titus at Rome, on which the central and side blocks of the Screen had been modelled, because it was not sufficiently ostentatious.

They had envisaged a design based on the Arch of Constantine, on which Nash's Marble Arch had been modelled. Burton created a new design, 'to pander to the majestic ego', which was much larger and modelled on a fragment found in the Ancient Roman Forum. This was accepted on 14 January 1826, and built 1826–1830 opposite the Ionic Screen.

== Sculpture of the Triumphal Arch ==
A moratorium from 1828 on public building works left the arch without decorative sculpture. In 1837 a public subscription was raised for an equestrian statue of Arthur Wellesley, 1st Duke of Wellington, to be placed on top of the arch. The organiser was Sir Frederick Trench, with his patron John Manners, 5th Duke of Rutland.

They selected as sculptor Matthew Cotes Wyatt, of whom F. M. O'Donoghue wrote in the Dictionary of National Biography "thanks to royal and other influential patronage, Wyatt enjoyed a reputation and practice to which his mediocre abilities hardly entitled him".

Burton repeatedly expressed his opposition to the proposal "as plainly and as vehemently as his nature allowed" over subsequent years. The statue would "disfigure" his arch, for which it was much too large. Contrary to all classical precedent, it would have to be placed across, instead of in line with, the roadway under the arch.

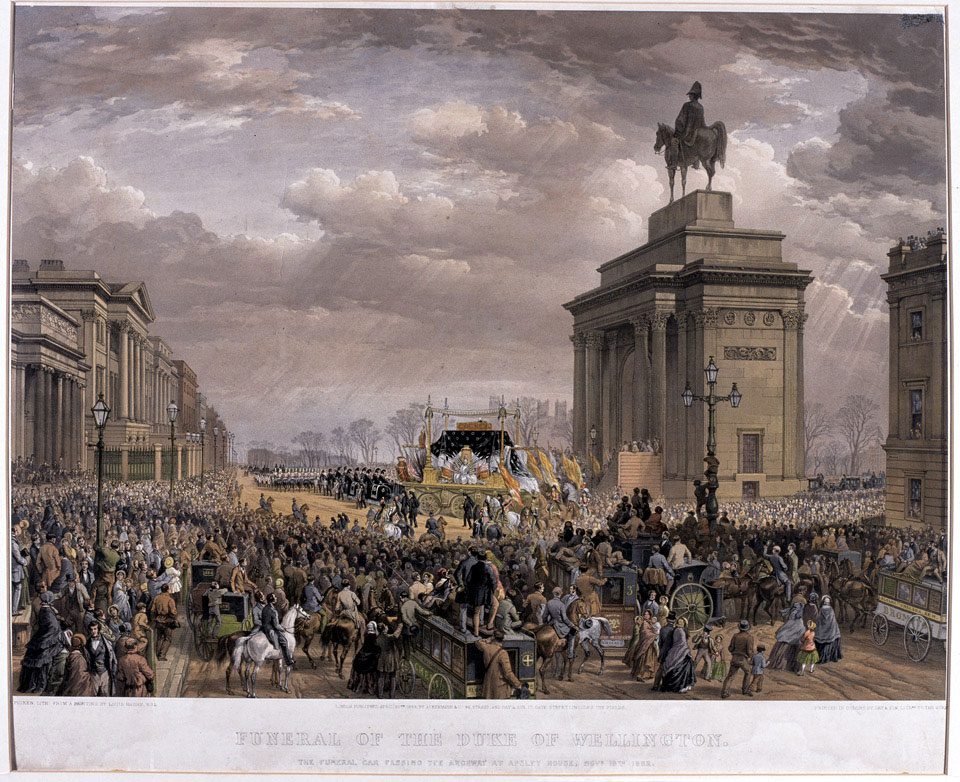
Funeral cortege of the Duke of Wellington. passing Hyde Park Corner, 18 November 1852. The Arch in its first location is surmounted by the original statue.

The objection was not just to the principle of an equestrian statue across the arch rather than a quadriga aligned with it. It was to the size of the statue. It was to be a colossal equestrian statue, 28 feet (8.5 metres) high and weighing 40 tons, the largest equestrian figure ever made.

Burton's objections were endorsed by most of the aristocratic residents of London. The Prime Minister, Sir Robert Peel, contended that another site would be preferable, and proposed, on behalf of the Crown, to offer any other site. The statue's subscribers rejected all alternative proposals. Every single MP except Sir Frederick Trench wanted the statue to be placed elsewhere.

Decimus Burton wrote, "The arch would, I consider, suffer greatly in importance if the colossal statue in question be placed there, because it would become a mere pedestal. The want of proportion in the proposed surmount, compared with the columns and other details of the architecture, would show that they had been designed by different hands, and without reference for each other... I would prefer that the building should remain for the present in its forlorn and bare state, rather than a colossal equestrian statue should be placed upon it..."

In 1846 the Government placed the Wellington statue on the arch. The Builder contended, "down, unquestionably, it must come. As the network of timber is removed, spar by spar, from before it, so do the folly of the experiment, the absurdity of the conjunction, and the greatness of the sacrifice become apparent. Its effect is even worse than we anticipated – the destruction of the arch by the statue, and of the statue by its elevation on the arch, more complete. Every post brings us letters urging renewed efforts to remove the figure to another site". Arguments about removal of the statue became national.

When it was placed, the Government had said that they would remove the statue if public feeling was strongly against it. However, they failed to remove it. Wellington was then in his late 70s; he died in 1852. Foreign intellectuals who visited London identified the incongruous fusion of the statue and the arch as "spectacular confirmation" of the "artistic ignorance of the English".

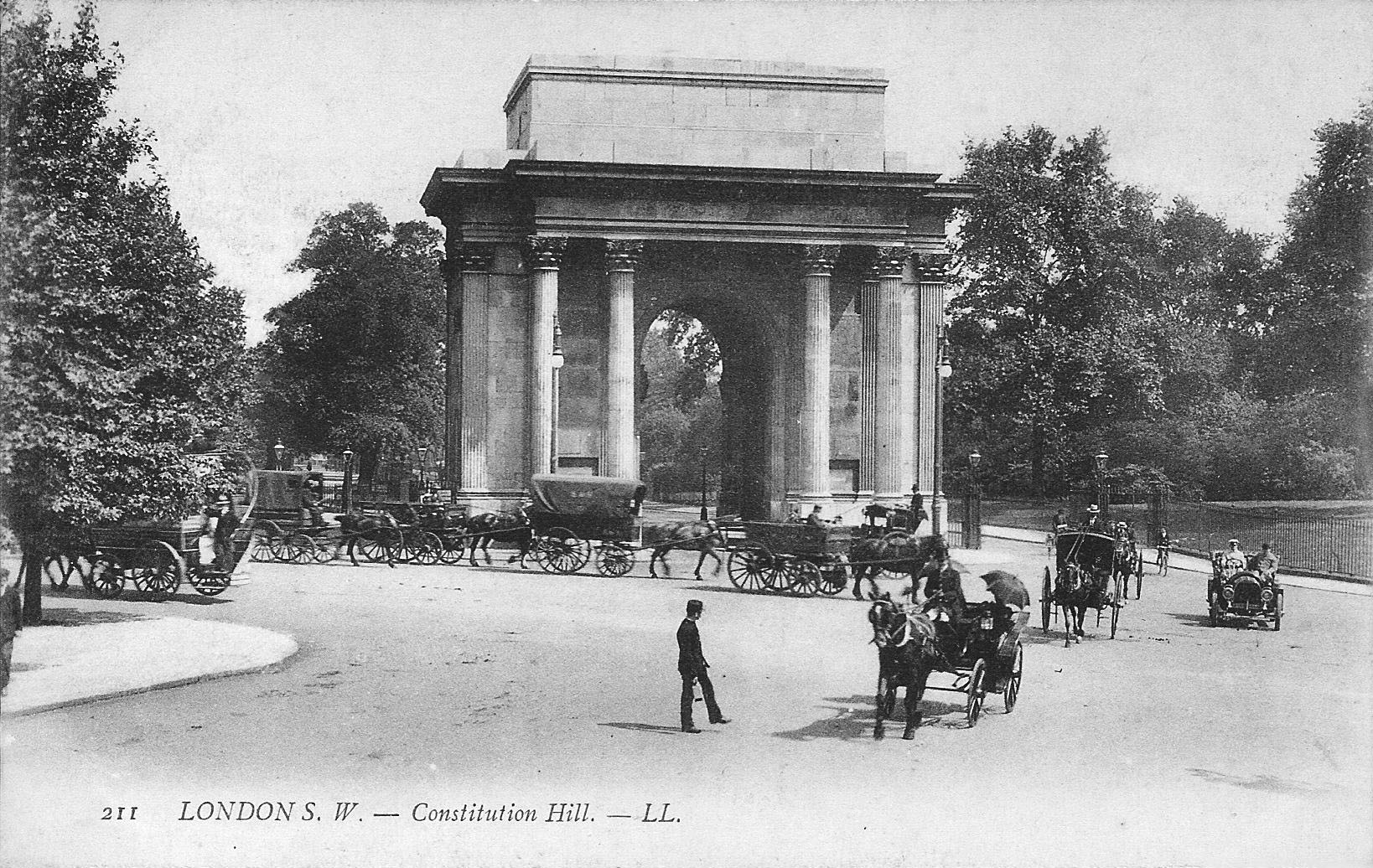
Wellington Arch,1905

=== Developments in the 1880s ===
In the early 1880s, traffic congestion at Hyde Park Corner (which was then a T-junction) led to demands for the junction to be enlarged. As both roads at the junction were hemmed in on one side by the arch, it would have to be taken down and rebuilt at another location. The proposed new layout put the arch at the top of Constitution Hill, creating space for a large triangular junction.

Burton's great-nephew Francis Fearon compiled and published a pamphlet that advocated that if the arch was moved, Wellington's statue should not go with it: the arch should be "relieved once and for all of its unsightly load". The campaign led by Fearon was successful: when the arch was taken down and rebuilt in 1882–1883, Wyatt's statue was put into storage. It was moved to Aldershot in 1885 and re-erected.

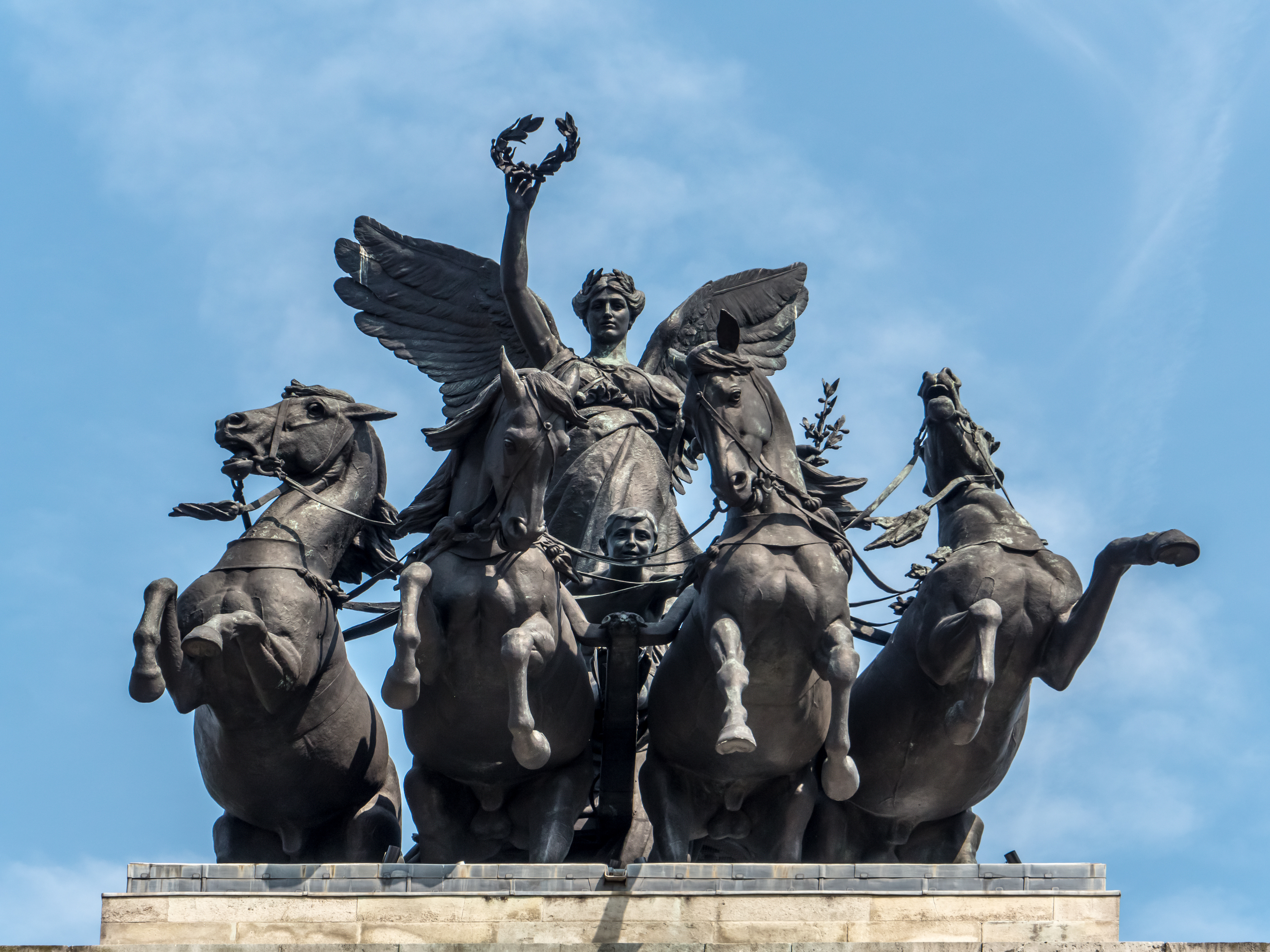
Peace descending on the Quadriga of War by Adrian Jones

Burton's arch remained bare for 30 years. In 1913 the sculpture Peace descending on the Quadriga of War by Adrian Jones was placed on it. Jones's statue is based on a smaller original which caught the eye of Edward VII at a Royal Academy exhibition. The sculpture depicts Nike, the winged goddess of victory, descending on the chariot of war, holding the classical symbol of victory and honour, a laurel wreath. The statue is the largest bronze sculpture in Europe.

== Post-war redevelopment ==
In 1938 Sir Charles Bressey wrote in The Highway Development Survey 1937:

Hyde Park Corner

The confused and shapeless road intersection at Hyde Park Corner carries the largest volume of traffic to be found anywhere in London. The increase recorded between the years 1919 and 1935 amounted to 125 per cent. The congestion frequently cause vexatious delays. A scheme for the simplification of traffic movements, by the formation of a dignified and symmetrical plaza, was illustrated by a model displayed at the Royal Academy Exhibition in 1937, as a result of collaboration between Sir Edwin Lutyens and myself....

Park Lane

Park Lane ... in its present state, is ill adapted to receive any additional influx of traffic... The form which I recommend that the improvement should take is the creation of a twin carriageway road by the inclusion in Park Lane of the "ring" road which now lies within the Park railings. By this means a handsome and spacious boulevard would be created, the two carriageways being separated by a strip of grass and trees...

Bressey's and Lutyens' plan for Hyde Park Corner reappeared in a slightly modified form (Note: The modifications were "the improved entrance to Hyde Park and the closing of Hamilton Place and lower Park Lane. The drawing shows No. 145 Piccadilly remodelled to balance Apsley House, the main entrance to Hyde Park being between the two buildings, whence the existing roads to Marble Arch are continued as a double parkway. The” Ionic Screen “is shown repeated to the East.") in the 1942 Royal Academy Report "London Replanned" and can be seen here. Although the plan was not implemented for more than twenty years, the die had been cast. A 1951 London road atlas showed the proposed roundabout at the southern end of the dual carriageway north of Apsley House and its connexion to Piccadilly through the site of the mansions to its east. One of these had been destroyed and another seriously damaged by bombing in the war.

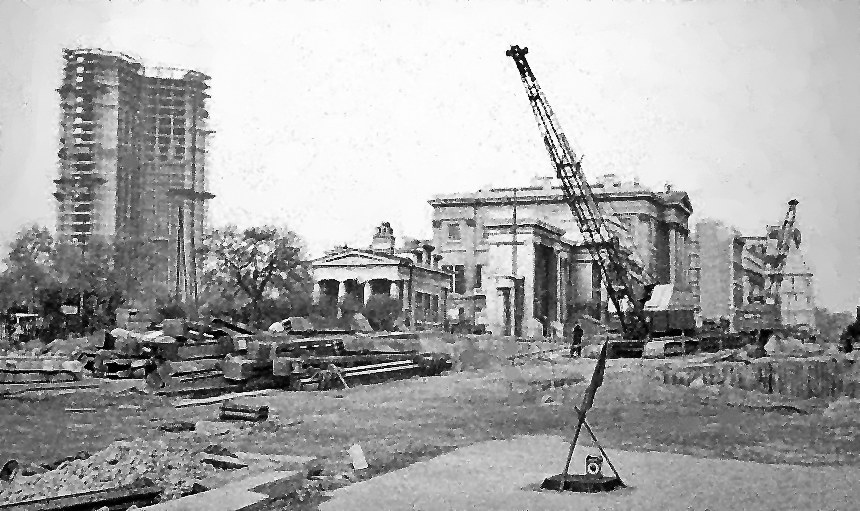
Construction of underpass at Hyde Park Corner, 1962

Before work could begin, an Act of Parliament was required to take land from the Royal Parks. The Park Lane Improvement Act 1958 (6 & 7 Eliz. 2. c. 63) was duly passed. An east-west vehicular underpass was added to Bressey's plans between Piccadilly and Knightsbridge, along with pedestrian underpasses to the central area. Wellington Arch was left where it was (now inside the roundabout) rather than being moved to the (new) top of Constitution Hill.

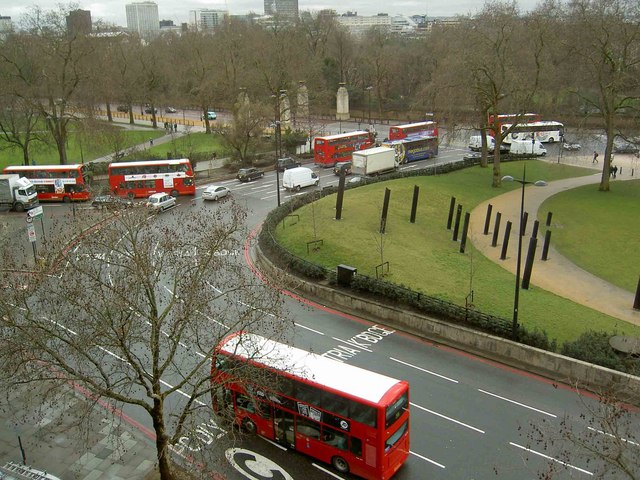
North-east corner of roundabout, looking over New Zealand War Memorial to Constitution Hill, 2010

The work was carried out between 1960 and 1962, with the underpass opening on 17 October 1962. Duke of Wellington Place, which had been the name of the hypotenuse of the triangle was now assigned as the name of the eastern and southern sides of the rectangle. The ceremonial route across the roundabout was given the name Apsley Way.

When it was opened, traffic lights controlled entry to the roundabout but not around the roundabout. In the 1990s, traffic lights were added on the roundabout. Those before the junctions with Constitution Hill and Knightsbridge make it easier for pedestrians, cyclists and horse-riders to reach the island by surface crossings.

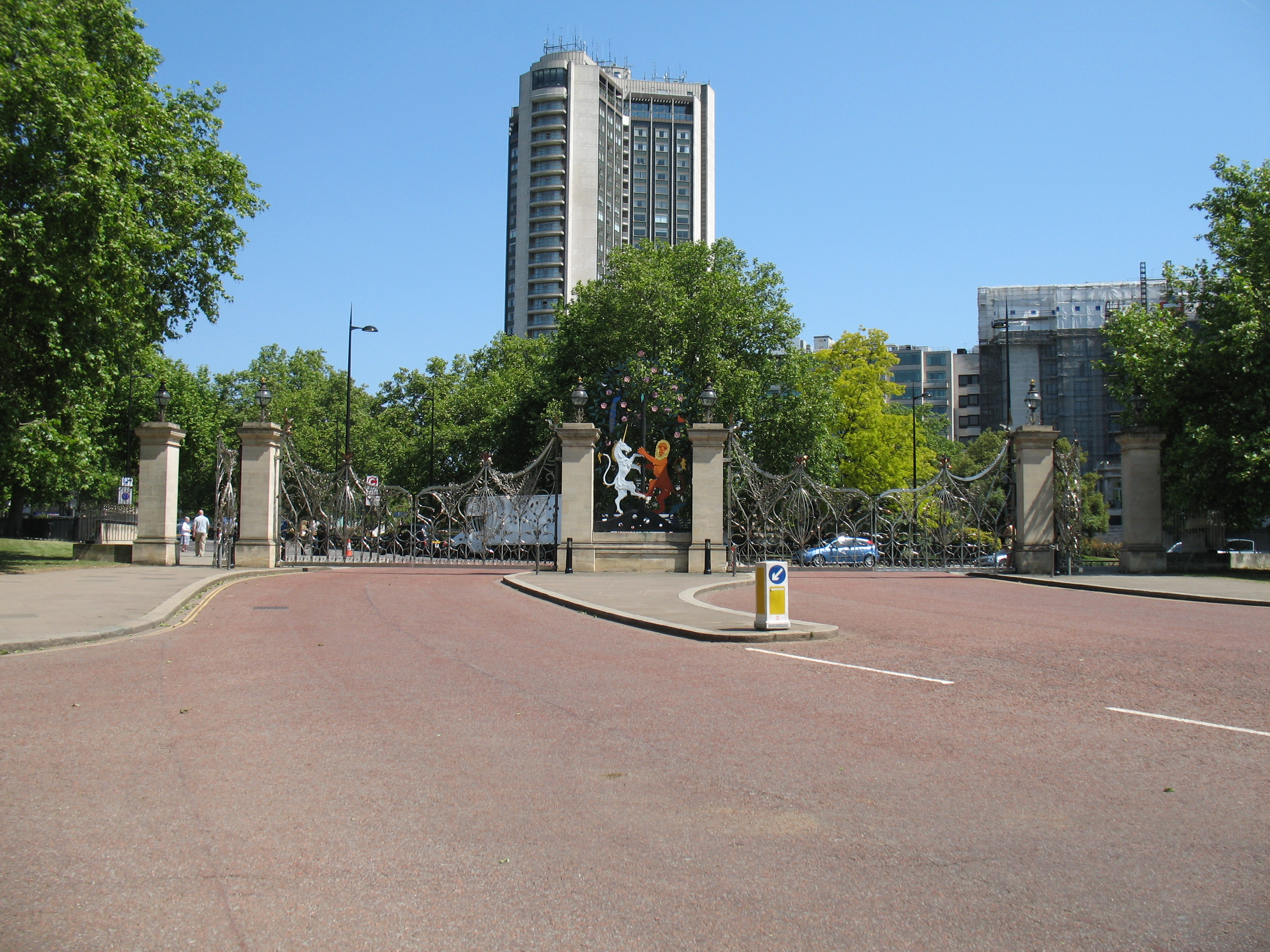
Queen Elizabeth Gate with Hilton Hotel, 2009

The InterContinental London hotel was built between Hamilton Place and the new route of Park Lane to the east of Apsley House, opening in 1975. In 1993, the Queen Elizabeth Gate was installed behind Apsley House to celebrate the 90th birthday of Queen Elizabeth the Queen Mother.

As well as the Wellington Arch, the centre of the roundabout includes an equestrian statue of Wellington by Joseph Edgar Boehm—unveiled in 1888—the Machine Gun Corps Memorial, the Royal Artillery Memorial, the Australian War Memorial and the New Zealand War Memorial.

Other monuments in the vicinity of Hyde Park Corner include Adrian Jones's Monument to the Cavalry of the Empire (off the west side of Park Lane), Alexander Munro's Boy and Dolphin statue (in a rose garden parallel to Rotten Row, going west from Hyde Park Corner), the Wellington Monument (Statue of Achilles), off the west side of Park Lane, and a statue of Lord Byron (on a traffic island opposite the Wellington Monument).

"Hyde Park Corner" is often erroneously used for Speakers' Corner, at the north-eastern corner of Hyde Park.

== In popular culture ==
- The 1935 film Hyde Park Corner takes its name from the area, where it is set.
- "Hyde Park Corner" was used as a codeword to announce to the government the death of King George VI in 1952.
  - "Hyde Park Corner" was the second episode of the first season of the Netflix series The Crown. It covered the death of George VI and the accession of Elizabeth II.

== Gallery of memorials ==
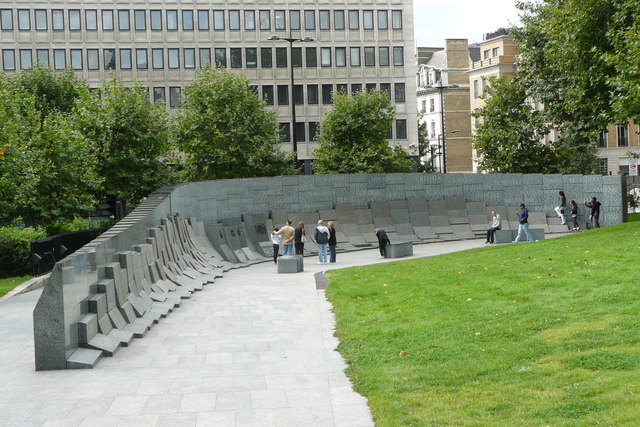
Australian War Memorial

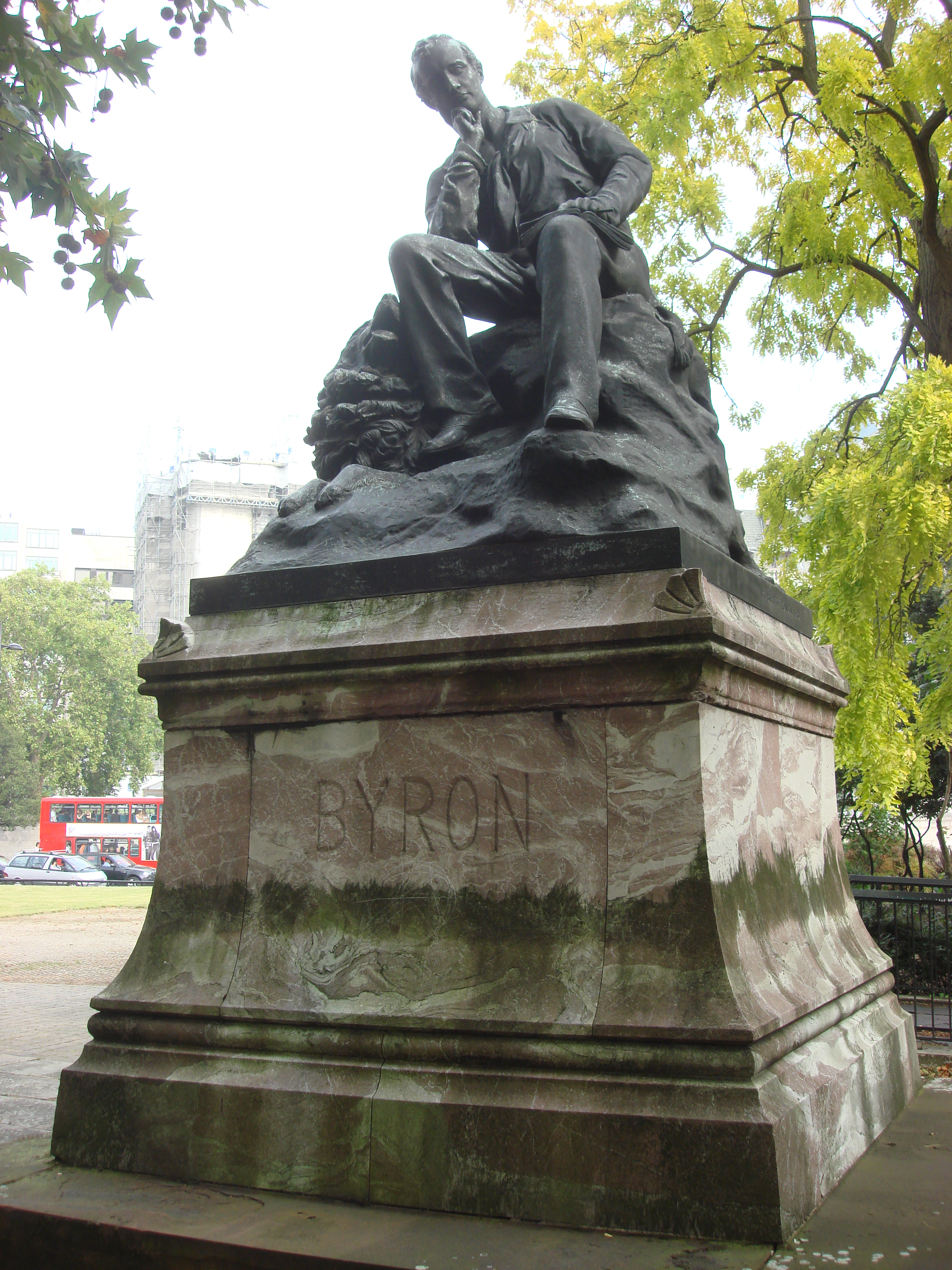
Statue of Lord Byron

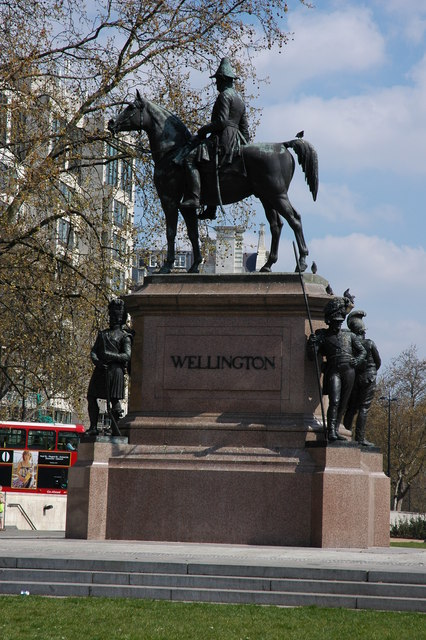
Equestrian Statue of the Duke of Wellington

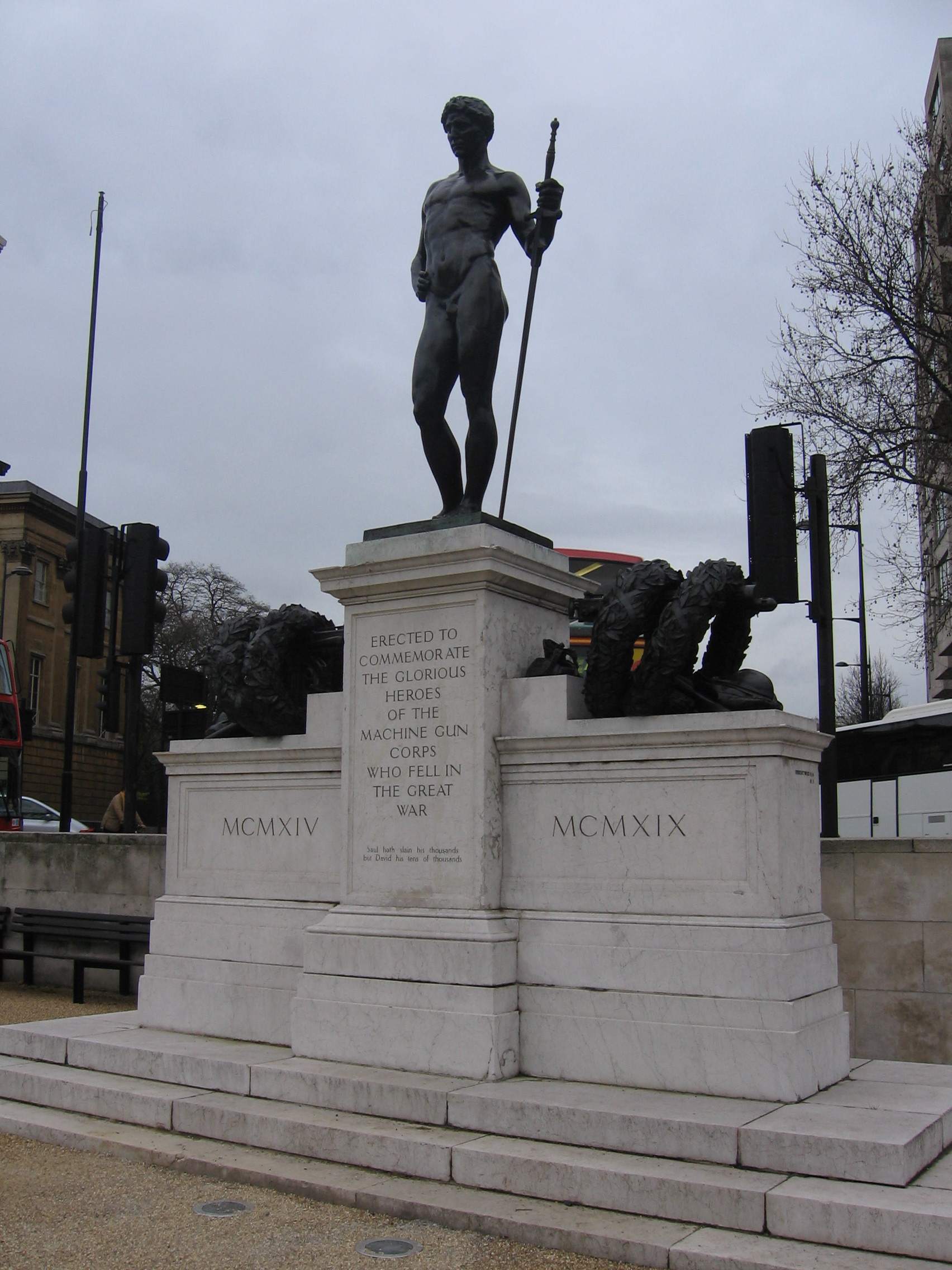
Machine Gun Corps Memorial

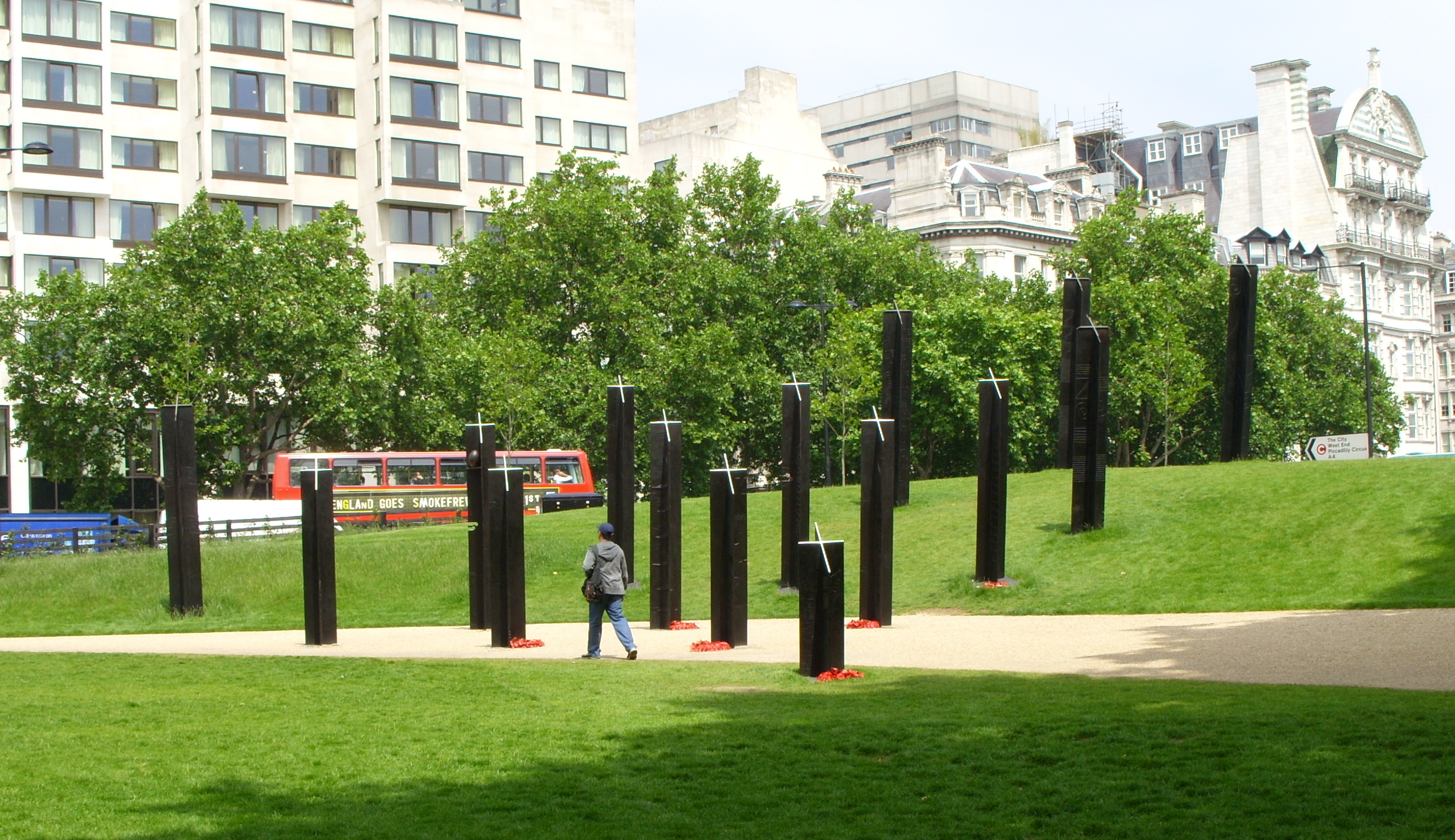
New Zealand War Memorial

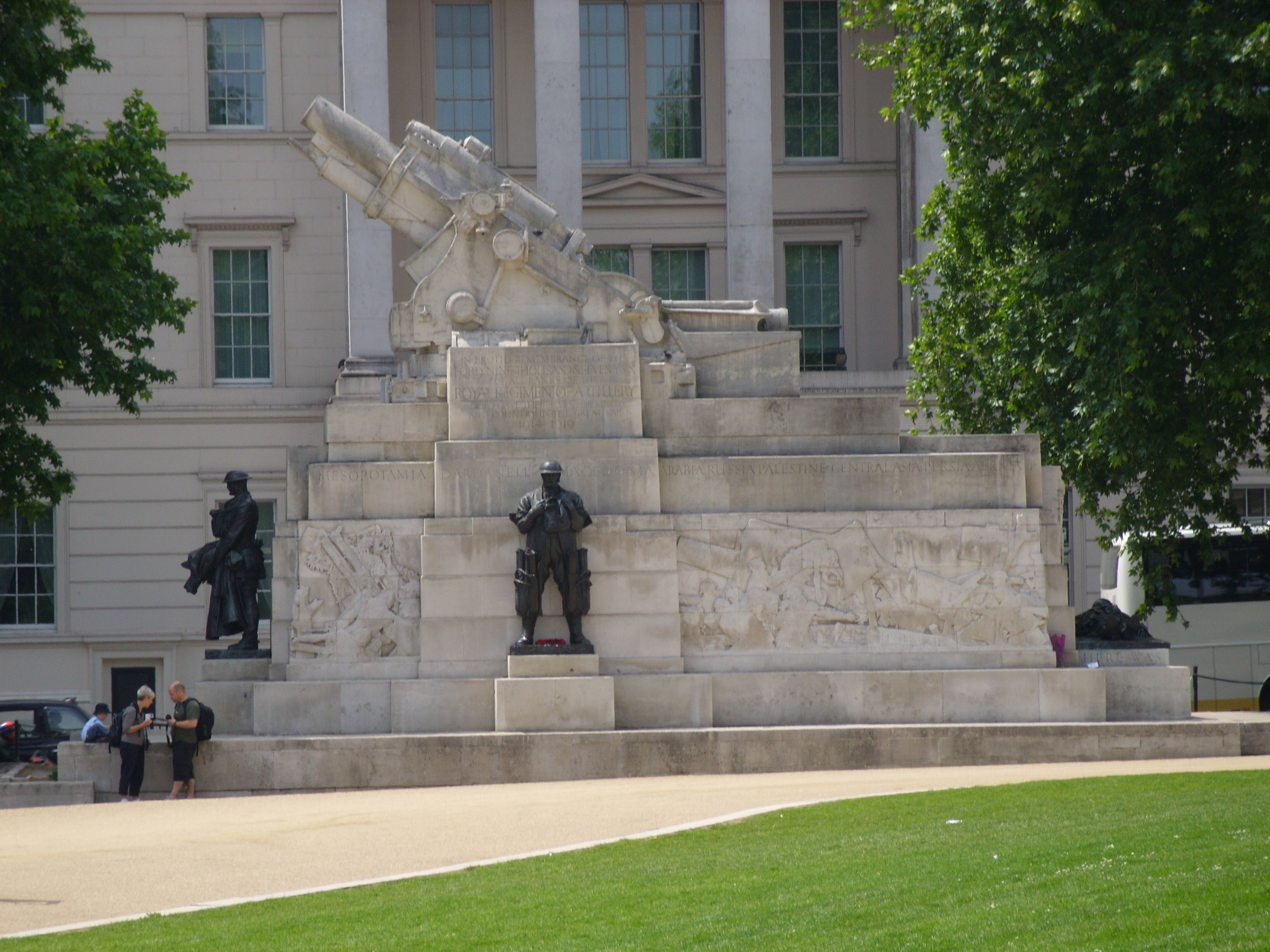
Royal Artillery Memorial

== See also ==
- St George's Hospital, originally sited at Hyde Park Corner
- The Lanesborough, a hotel on Hyde Park Corner occupying the former St George's hospital buildings
- Death and state funeral of George VI, where the code phrase "Hyde Park Corner" was used to notify authorities of his death
