= George Tattersall =

English painter

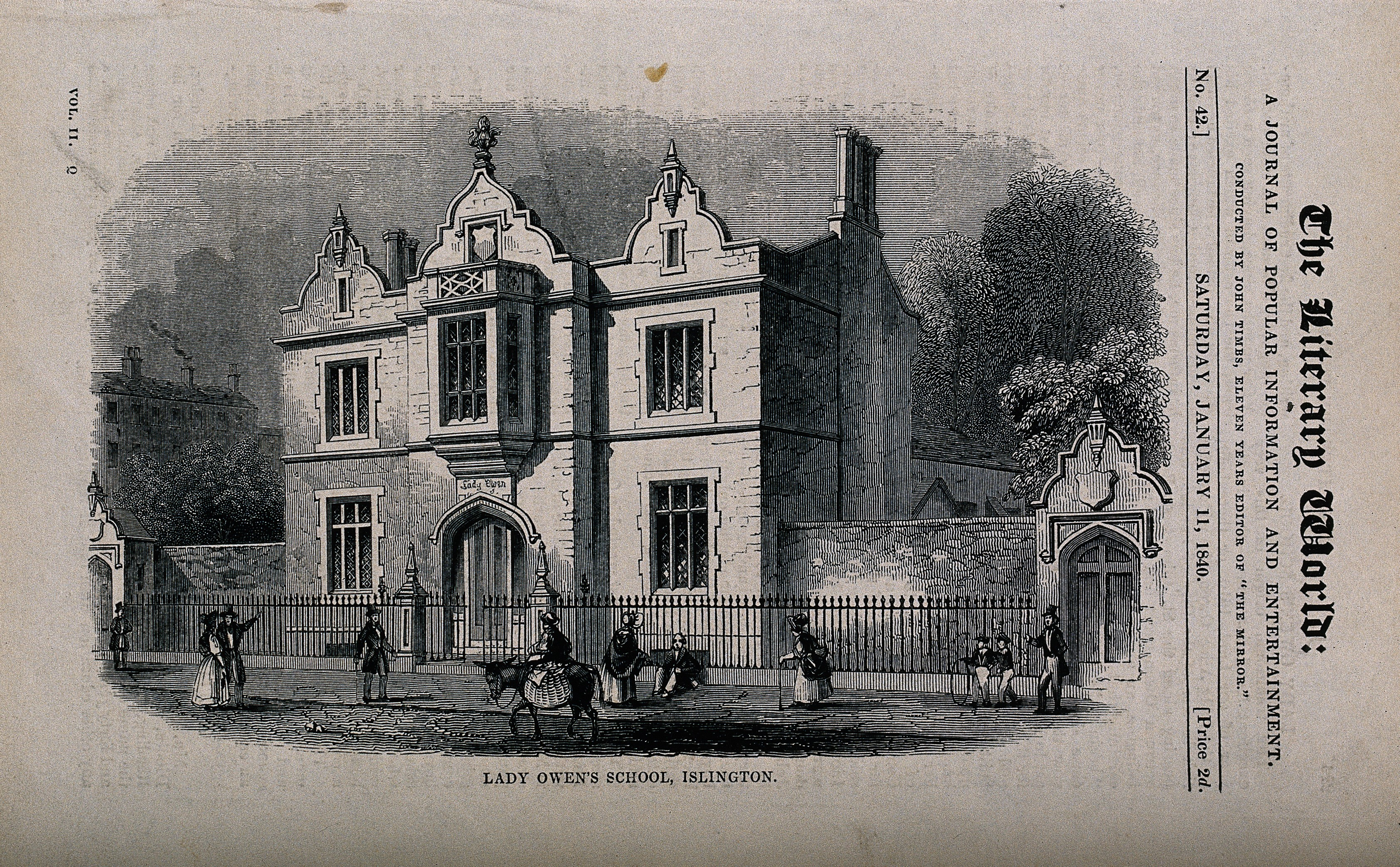
Lady Owen's School, Islington, designed by George Tattersall

George Tattersall (pseud. "Wildrake") (13 June 1817 – 16 August 1849) was an English sporting artist and architect.

Born in Hyde Park Corner, London, he was a member of the family which operated the Tattersall's horse market, the son of Richard (III) Tattersall (1785–1859). In 1836 he compiled a guide to The Lakes of England illustrated with forty-three charming line drawings, and he showed skill as an architect by building various stables and kennels, including the Tattersall stud stables at Willesden. His experience in this and similar undertakings led him to publish Sporting Architecture (1841).

In the same year, under the pseudonym "Wildrake," he published Cracks of the Day, describing and illustrating sixty-five racehorses. He also contributed illustrations to the Hunting Reminiscences of Nimrod (Charles J. Apperley), the Book of Sports (1843), and the New Sporting Almanack. He was for a brief period the editor of the Almanack and Sporting Magazine.

Shortly after a visit to the United States he married, in 1837, Helen Pritchard; they had four children. He died of brain fever at his home in Cadogan Place, London and was buried at West Norwood Cemetery.

== Sources ==
- This article incorporates text from a publication now in the public domain: Chisholm, Hugh, ed. (1911). "Tattersall's s.v. George Tattersall". Encyclopædia Britannica. Vol. 26 (11th ed.). Cambridge University Press. p. 451.
- This article incorporates text from a publication now in the public domain: "Tattersall, Richard". Dictionary of National Biography. London: Smith, Elder & Co. 1885–1900.
- "Tattersall family". Oxford Dictionary of National Biography (online ed.). Oxford University Press. doi:10.1093/ref:odnb/64817. (Subscription, Wikipedia Library access or UK public library membership required.)
