= Christopher Simcox =

English murderer

Christopher Simcox (10 December 1909 – 23 January 1981) was an English double murderer, notable and perhaps unique in being twice sentenced to death, and twice reprieved.

Simcox, a maintenance fitter by trade, lived in Smethwick, Staffordshire, England. He was divorced by his first wife for cruelty.

Simcox murdered his second wife in 1948, and was sentenced to death at Stafford Assizes. However, in April 1948 the House of Commons had passed Sydney Silverman's amendment to the then current Criminal Justice Bill to suspend capital punishment for murder for five years. The House of Lords overturned the amendment later in the year, but in the intervening period the Home Secretary, James Chuter Ede had announced that he would reprieve all condemned prisoners until the law was settled. Between March and October 1948, 26 persons, including Simcox, were thereby reprieved. Simcox served 10 years in prison, before being released on licence.

In 1962, Simcox married, for the third time. In 1963 he threatened his wife Ruby Irene with an air-pistol. He was charged with attempted murder and housebreaking, but was placed on probation after only being convicted of unlawful possession of a weapon. His wife subsequently left him, with the help of relatives. On 11 November 1963 Simcox, armed with a rifle, went in search of his wife. He shot her sister, Mrs Hilda Payton, fatally through the head, before pursuing his wife to her brother's house. There he shot them both, but they survived. Simcox then turned the gun on himself, shooting himself twice through the body, but he also survived.

In February 1964 Simcox was again tried at Stafford Assizes, and sentenced to death by Mr Justice Finnemore. The Homicide Act 1957 had restricted capital murder to a limited class of crimes, including murder with a firearm, and a second murder committed on a different occasion from the first. Simcox was eligible to be hanged on both grounds.

The wording of Simcox's sentences of death was slightly different on the two occasions. In 1948 he was sentenced "to be hanged by the neck until you are dead", while in 1964 he was sentenced "to suffer death in the manner authorised by law." This change in language was provided in the 1957 Act; the old language was considered anachronistic, as since the 1870s Britain had employed the "long-drop" method of hanging, which was held to cause near-instantaneous death.

Simcox's date of execution was set for Tuesday 17 March 1964 at Winson Green Prison, Birmingham. However, his lawyers petitioned the Home Secretary, Henry Brooke, on the grounds that Simcox was still severely injured from his self-inflicted wounds, could not walk, and would likely have to be hanged in a wheelchair. There was no precedent for postponing an execution until a prisoner was fit enough to be hanged, and there was a history of reprieving prisoners whose executions might result in an unseemly spectacle owing to existing injuries or infirmity. On 14 March 1964, Brooke announced that Simcox had been reprieved, the sentence of death automatically being replaced by life imprisonment; at that time there was no provision for attaching special conditions to such a sentence, meaning that one day Simcox might be released again, albeit on licence.

Five months later, the last-ever hangings in Britain, the executions of Gwynne Evans and Peter Allen, took place, and in 1965, capital punishment was, in practice, abolished for murder. In 1969 Simcox's wife divorced him, and the civil judge in that case took the unusual step of recommending that Simcox never be released.

Simcox died in HM Prison Kingston, Portsmouth in early 1981, aged 71.
