= Leeds Town Hall =

Grade I listed building in England

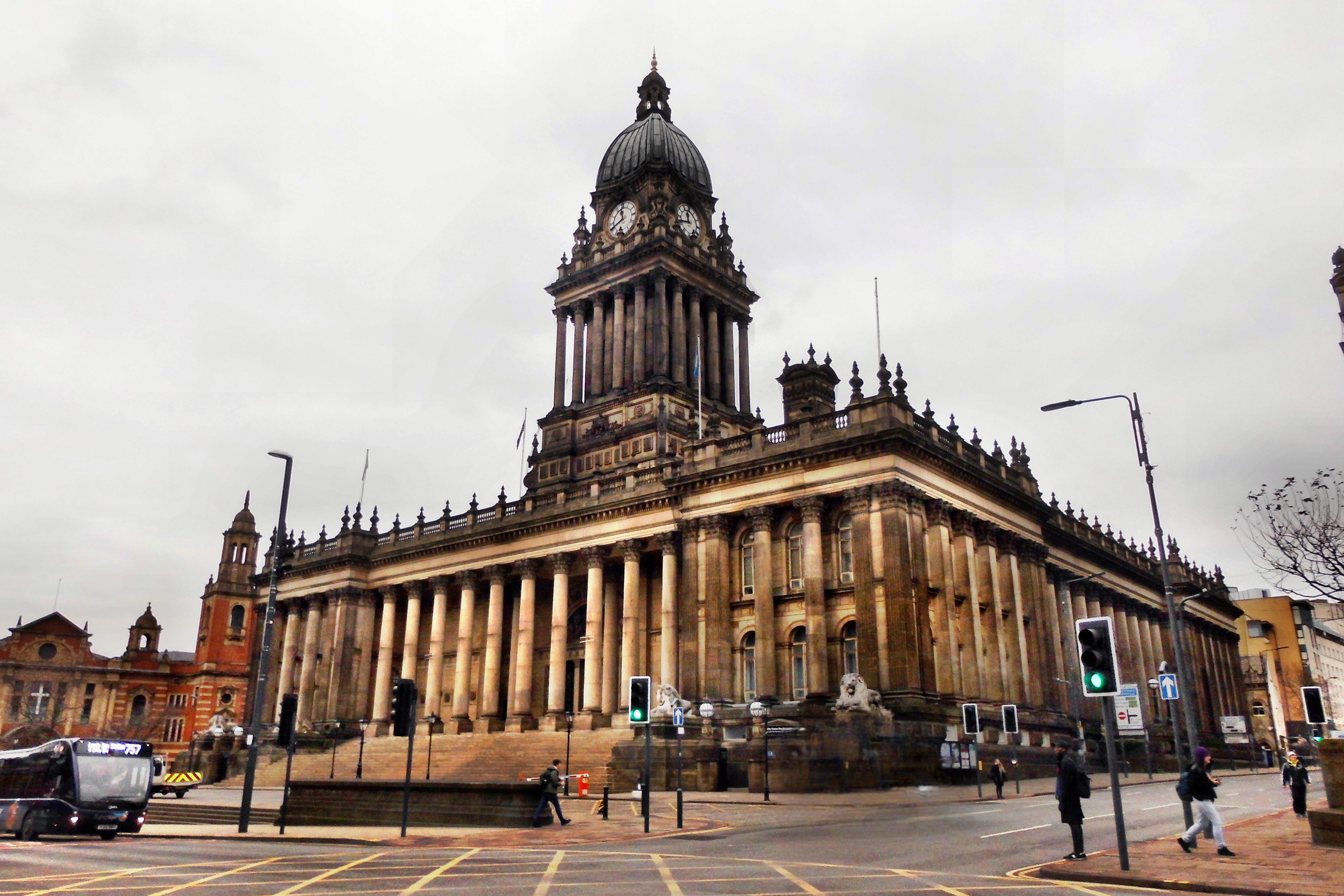
- Leeds Town Hall in 2018
- Interactive map of the Leeds Town Hall area

General information
- Architectural style: Neoclassical/Baroque Revival
- Location: Leeds, England
- Coordinates: 53.8003°N 1.5497°W
- Construction started: 17 August 1853
- Opened: 7 September 1858
- Renovated: 2019–2023
- Cost: £125,000
- Client: Corporation of Leeds

Height
- Height: 225 ft (69 m)

Technical details
- Floor area: 5,600 sq yd (4,700 m^{2})

Design and construction
- Architect: Cuthbert Brodrick
- Other designers: Catherine Mawer, John Thomas, John Crace
- Main contractor: Samuel Atack

Renovating team
- Architect: Page\Park

Other information
- Seating capacity: 1,550

Listed Building – Grade I
- Designated: 19 October 1951
- Reference no.: 1255772

Website
- www.leedstownhall.co.uk

Leeds Town Hall is a 19th-century municipal building on The Headrow (formerly Park Lane), Leeds, West Yorkshire, England. Planned to include law courts, a council chamber, offices, a public hall, and a suite of ceremonial rooms, it was built between 1853 and 1858 to a design by the architect Cuthbert Brodrick. With the building of the Civic Hall in 1933, some of these functions were relocated, and after the construction of the Leeds Combined Court Centre in 1993, the Town Hall now serves mainly as a concert, conference and wedding venue, its offices still used by some council departments. It was designated a Grade I listed building in 1951.

Imagined as a municipal palace to demonstrate the power and success of Victorian Leeds, and opened by Queen Victoria in a lavish ceremony in 1858, it is one of the largest town halls in the United Kingdom. With a height of 225 feet (68.6 m), it was the tallest building in Leeds for 108 years from 1858 until 1966, when it lost the title to the Park Plaza Hotel, which stands 26 feet (8 m) taller at 253 feet (77 m). The distinctive baroque clock tower, which serves as a landmark and a symbol of Leeds, was not part of the initial design but was added by Brodrick in 1856 as the civic leaders sought to make an even grander statement.

The project to build the Town Hall came about as Leeds underwent rapid growth and industrialisation during the 19th century, helped by a desire to compete with Bradford and symbolise Leeds's dominance within the region. Proceedings began in July 1850, carried through by a dedicated committee of the Town Council, which held a competition selecting the relatively unknown Brodrick to prepare a design, with construction underway by July 1853. The building cost much more than the original estimates due to rising prices and constant additions to its design throughout construction.

The form of Leeds Town Hall has been used as a model for civic buildings across Britain and the British Empire, being one of the largest and earliest. As a key heritage asset for the city, its history as a court and prison is demonstrated in guided tours for the public. Several recurring cultural events use the Town Hall as a performance space, such as the Leeds International Piano Competition.

== Description ==
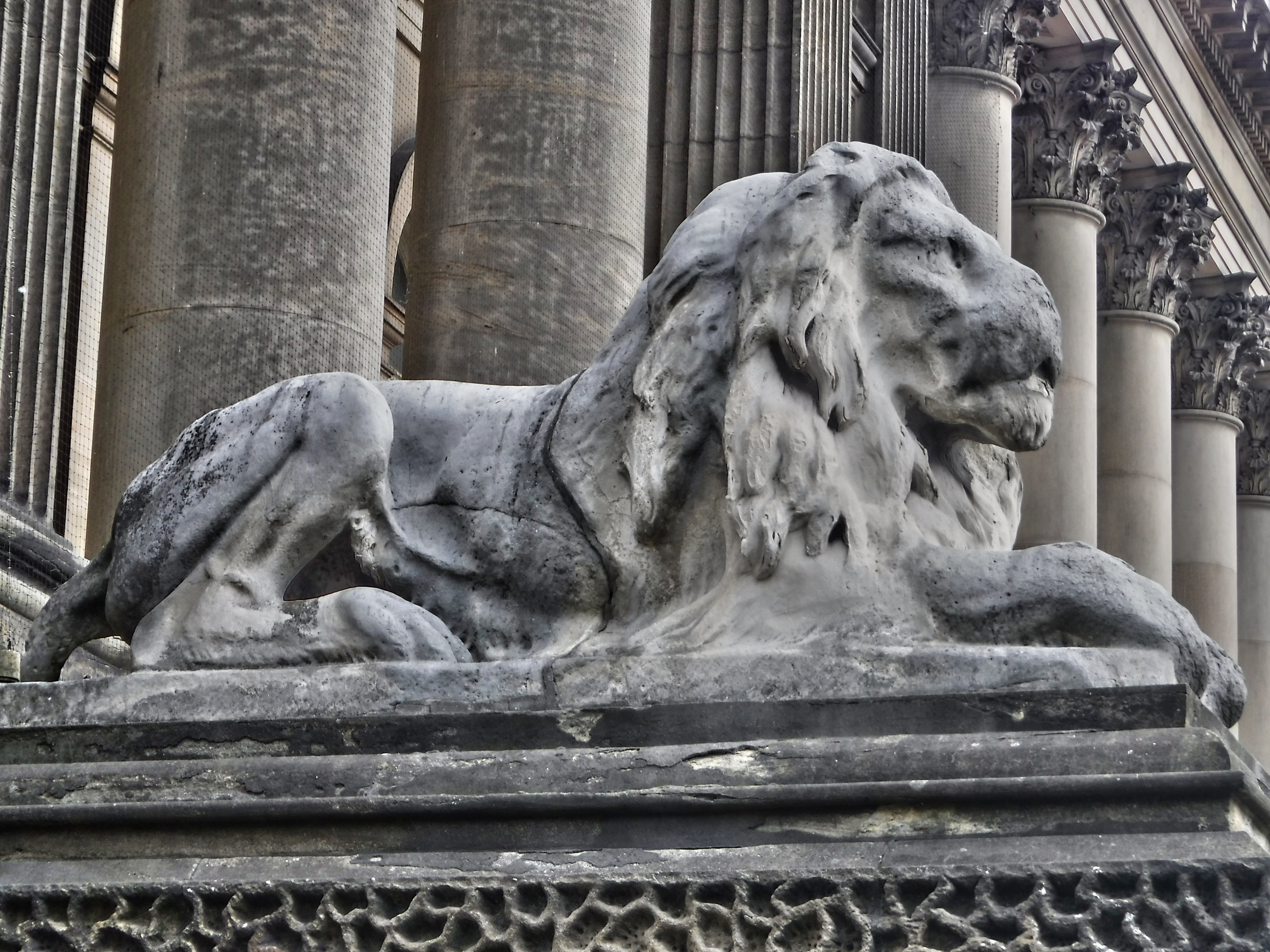
Portland stone lion statue, showing erosion of the soft stone

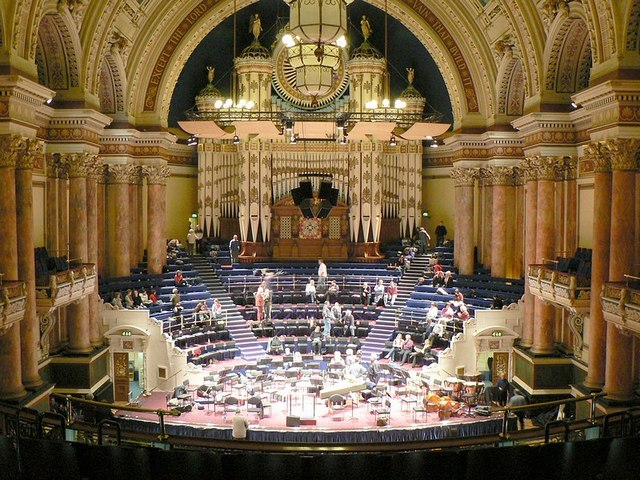
Victoria Hall showing the pipe organ and stage

The Town Hall is classical in style but suggestive of power and drama. It stands at the top of a flight of steps on a mound made specially for the purpose of increasing its prominent position. The south, principal facade to The Headrow has a deeply recessed portico of ten Corinthian columns, a frieze and then the 225-foot-high (68.6 m) clock tower, which has a concave dome and was not in the original design.

The three other sides of the building are similar to the south front, except that the columns and pilasters that surround them are near to the walls, and the spaces between them have two tiers of circular-headed windows. The principal entrance is a 32 ft (9.8 m)-high archway under the south portico, which contains three highly ornamented wrought iron doors. The smaller, day-to-day entrance is to the east, facing Calverley Street.

The Victoria Hall – originally the Great Hall – rises to 92 ft 6 in (28.19 m) inside the parallelogram of surrounding rooms and corridors and the enclosing colonnades. It is lined with marble-effect columns with gilt capitals and bases, with painted mottoes around the walls, including "Good Will towards Men", "Trial by Jury", and "Forward". The decoration was by John Crace, and, combined with the cut-glass chandeliers and the largest organ in Europe when opened, led one writer to say that it was "the best place in Britain to see what it looked like on the inside of a wedding cake". As the principal performance space, the richly decorated Victoria Hall is still a venue for orchestral concerts. The frescoes adorning the domed ceiling of the vestibule (foyer) were the first attempt to embellish a provincial edifice with high art. In the centre of the vestibule stands an 8 ft (2.4 m)-high white marble statue of Queen Victoria, by Matthew Noble, presented to the Council upon the hall's opening as the gift of the mayor Sir Peter Fairbairn.

The Town Hall provided accommodation for municipal departments, a courtroom, police station, and a venue for concerts and civic events. It still has a role as a council office, though many departments have since relocated – most are now in Merrion House, opened 2018, and others, including a chamber for council meetings, are in the 1933 Civic Hall.

=== Sculpture ===
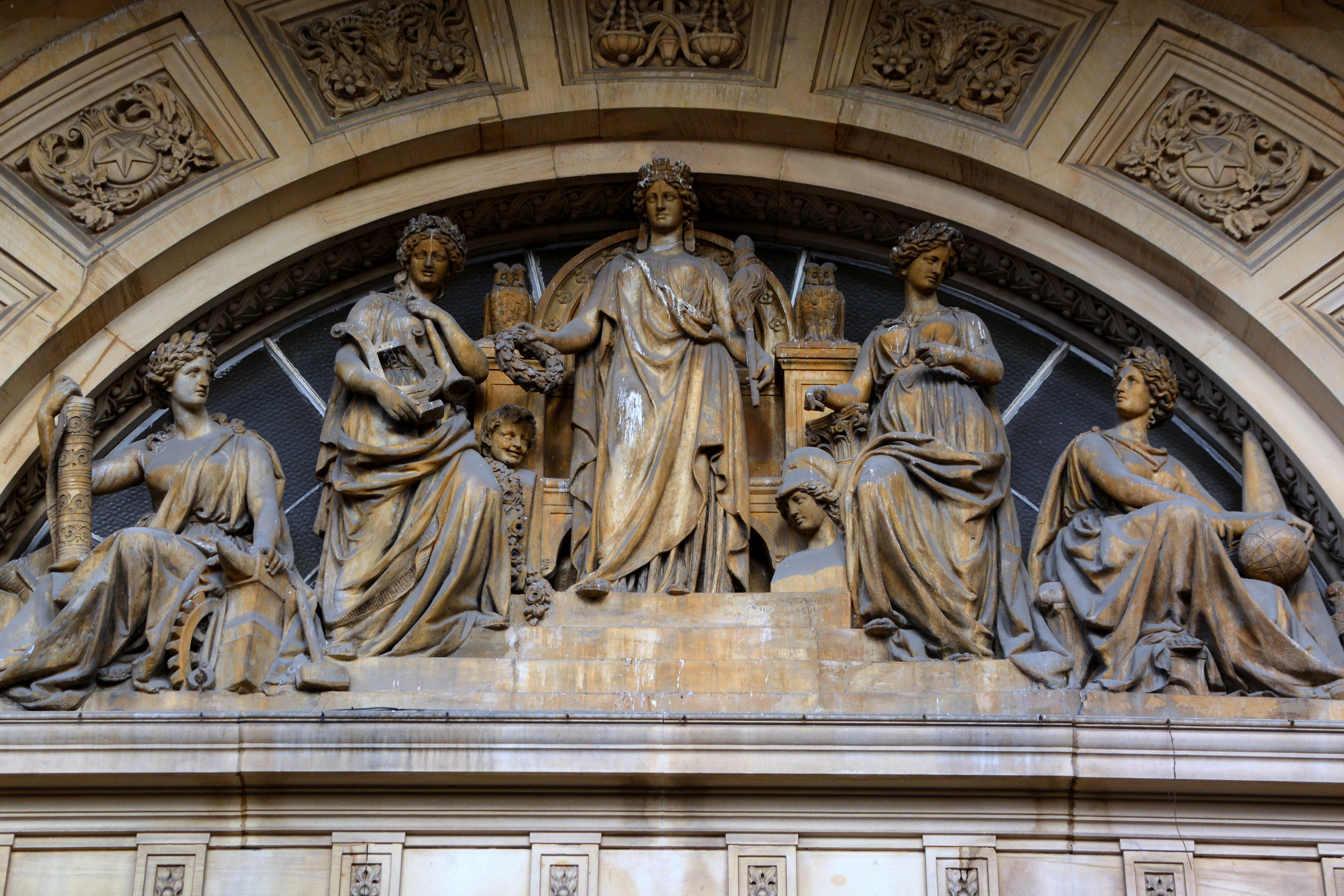
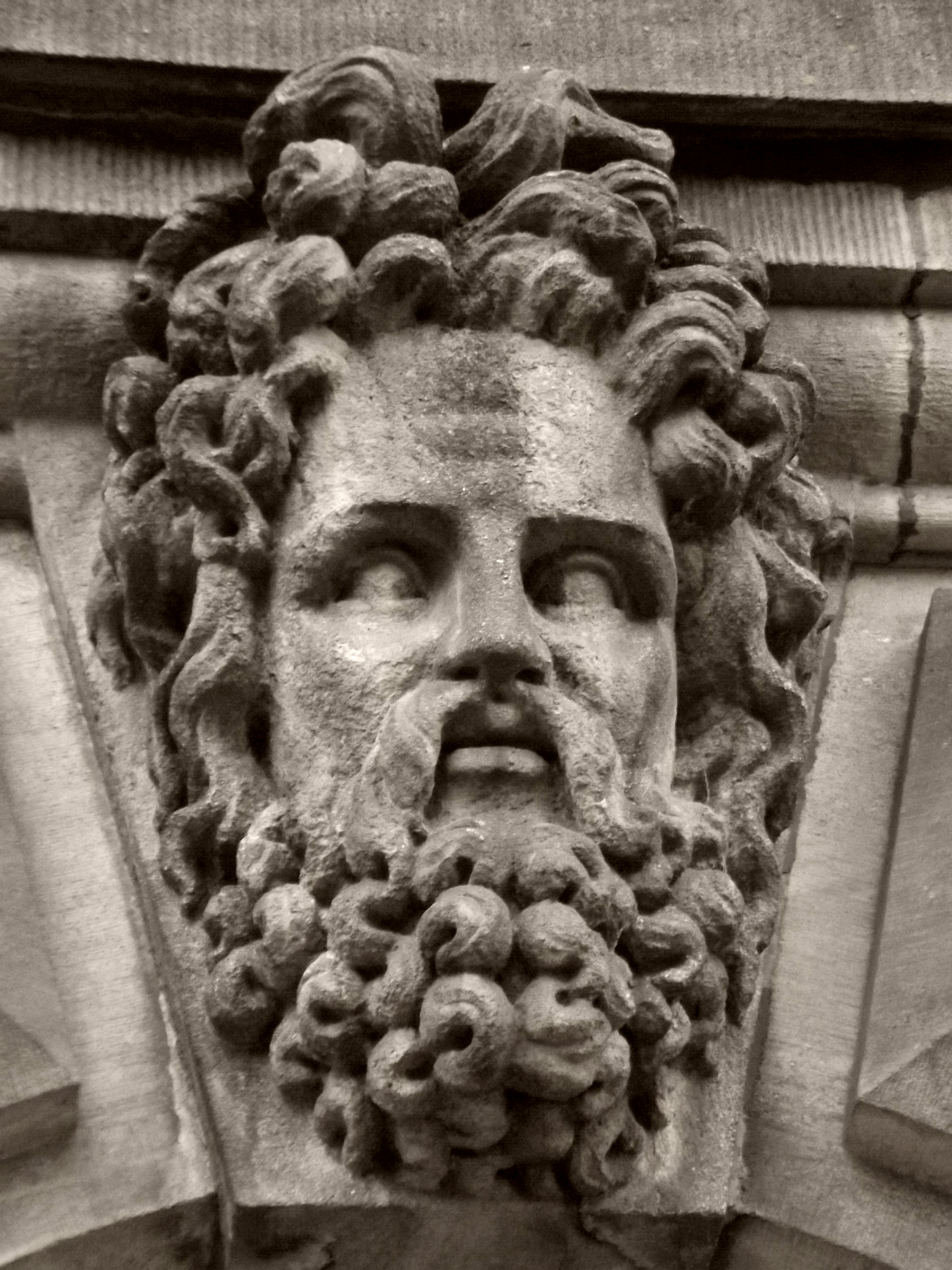
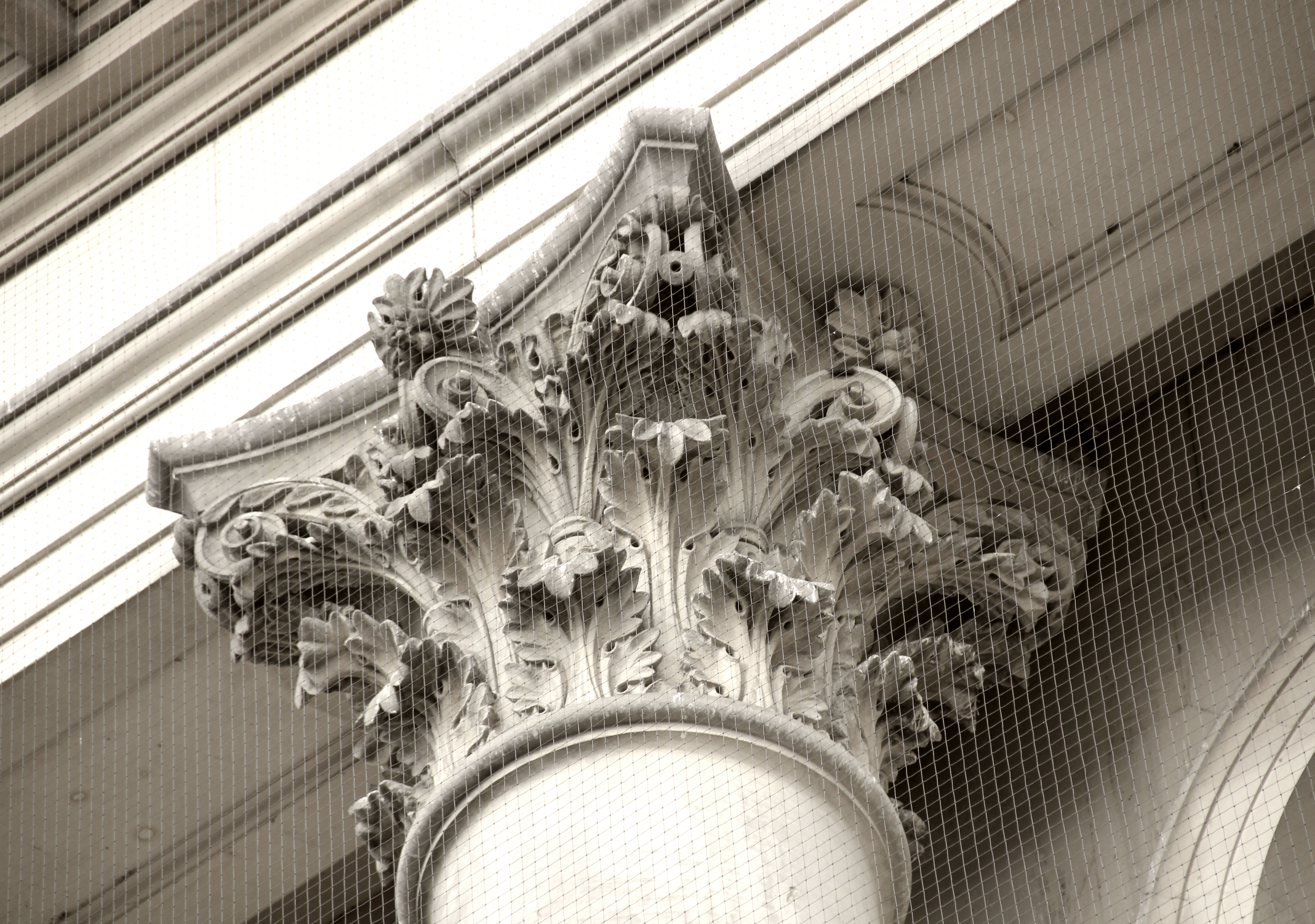
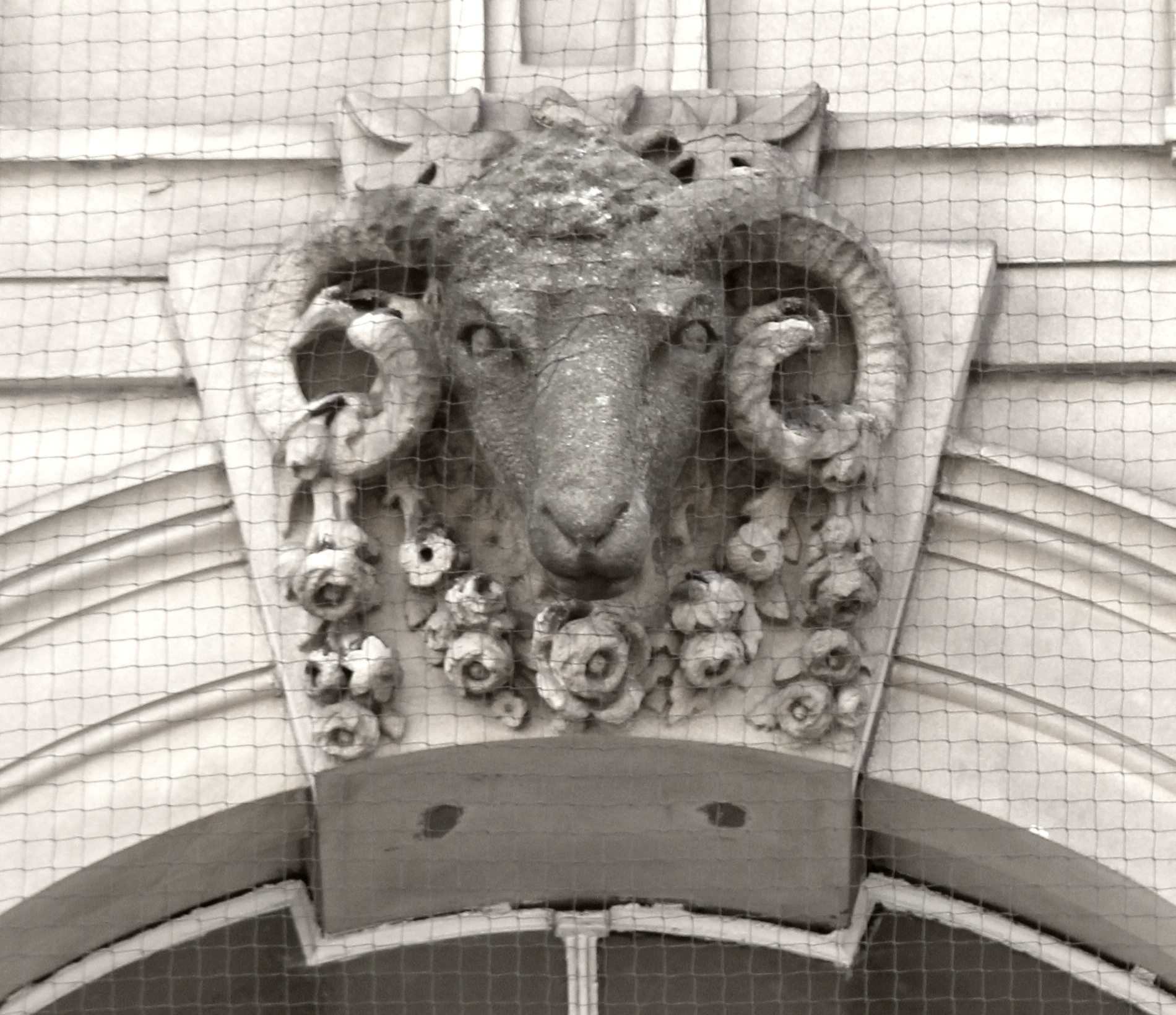
Clockwise from top left: Tympanum (Thomas), keystone head (Appleyard), fleece (Ingle) and a Corinthian capital

The building is constructed of Rawden Hill millstone grit. As architectural master sculptors the Mawer Group produced the majority of the decorative carving. This did not include the rusticated and vermiculated base, the "giant" columns and fluted pilasters, the parapet with vases, or the basic detailing to the tower and ventilation turrets, which were the work of masons including Thomas Whiteley, who was associated with Robert Mawer. In preparation for the sculptural work, the carving areas were roughed out on the building blocks by the masons before the blocks were hoisted into place. The architectural sculptors would ascend ladders and scaffolds to carve the fine art pieces in public view.

The sculptor credited for the general carving work on the building is Catherine Mawer, whose stoneyards were in Oxford Place on the west side of the building, and George Street (now Great George Street) on the north side. Her nephew William Ingle, who ran the stoneyards, carved all the sheep head reliefs, which represent the fleece. He was also responsible for the team that produced the general architectural sculpture.

The tympanum above the south entrance is by the sculptor John Thomas (1813–1862). The figures represent Progress, Art and Commerce. The central figure is Athena, who has a laurel wreath, distaff, judicial chair, and owls taken from the Leeds coat of arms and from her own set of animal attributes. From left, the other four main figures are Industry with an anvil and a bale of cloth, Poetry and Music with a faun's head and a flower-swag, Fine Arts with a Corinthian capital and a bust of Minerva, and Science with a compass, globe and tools.

On the west and north elevations of the building, the fourteen keystone heads were being sculpted by Catherine Mawer's husband Robert, between 1853 and 1854, when he died. Catherine Mawer completed the masks, as well as the putti on the side panels of the main entrance and on the clock tower. The four Portland stone lions on plinths along the frontage, an 1867 addition by the sculptor William Day Keyworth Jr, contrast with the sandstone of the building itself, and were modelled at London Zoo. The first two lions were unveiled on 15 February 1867, the soft Portland stone has subsequently eroded with the weather.

== History ==
=== Background ===
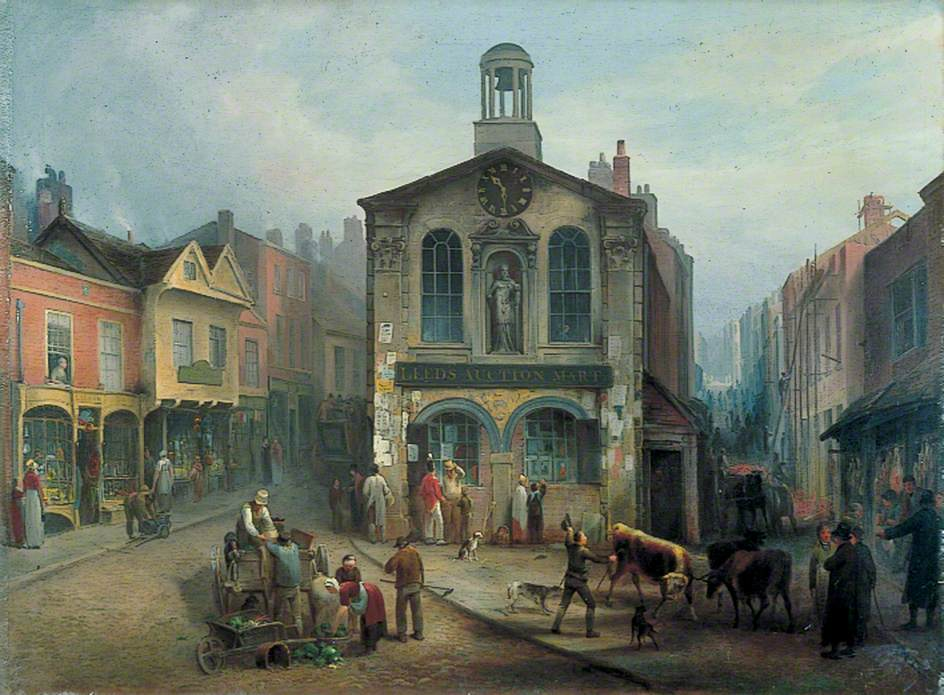
The demolished Moot Hall, Briggate, was the seat of Leeds Corporation until 1813

Until 1813, the seat of Leeds Corporation was the Moot Hall of 1618, on Briggate, which was also used for judicial purposes. Leeds went through a period of rapid growth in the first half of the 19th century and by the mid-19th century it became apparent that the court house was no longer large enough for the functions it performed; it was demolished in 1825 and replaced by a new court house on Park Row.

The neighbouring town of Bradford, the "wool capital of the world", took the lead in trying to elevate industrial Yorkshire towns with stately, grand architecture by building St George's Hall in 1851–53. It was a new status symbol, and as there was perpetual competition between Leeds and Bradford, calls grew within Leeds for its own town hall. The physician and social reformer Dr John Deakin Heaton became a major advocate and campaigner for a town hall, having visited Europe and enviously remarked on the "famous old cities whose Town Halls are the permanent glory of the inhabitants and the standing wonder and delight of visitors from a distance". His, and other supporters', belief was that "if a noble municipal palace that might fairly view with some of the best Town Halls of the Continent were to be erected in the middle of their hitherto squalid and unbeautiful town, it would become a practical admonition to the populace of the value of beauty and art, and in course of time men would learn to live up to it".

In July 1850, Leeds Town Council held a public meeting, the decision of which was that a "large public hall" should be built. Emulating St George's Hall, the council proposed to sell shares in the building to the value of £10 (equivalent to £1,164 in 2025) but there was little public interest. In October, a councillor proposed introducing a specific rate levied to fund its construction instead of using a joint stock company. A decision was deferred until after the municipal election of November 1850 to give ratepayers a chance to express their views. The town hall was approved in January 1851 when the motion was put to the council and carried by twenty-four votes to twelve. The resolution read: "As the attempt to raise funds by public subscription has failed, it is the opinion of this Council desirable to erect a Town Hall, including suitable corporate buildings". The sum voted was £22,000 for the building and £9,500 for the land. It was intended to represent Leeds's emergence as an important industrial centre during the Industrial Revolution and symbolise civic pride and confidence.

A council committee was established to assess the opinions of Leeds's inhabitants. It sent delegations to other large towns including Manchester and Liverpool to investigate their plans for building public halls. In July 1851, it presented a report, with consultees including Joseph Paxton, the designer of The Crystal Palace. The report's recommendation identified a site for the hall on what was then Park Lane (since redeveloped into the Headrow) which contained Park House and its gardens. This site was on the edge of the town centre of the time, but the project required a large parcel of land that was unavailable in the congested central streets. It was purchased from a wealthy merchant named John Blayds for the sum of £9,500 (equivalent to £1,146,666 in 2025).

The scheme did not secure universal backing immediately; a council motion in February 1852 proposed it was "unwise and inexpedient to proceed with the Hall". This, and other motions to limit its costs, were defeated by small majorities, but they demonstrated that financial prudence was a strong compulsion for some Victorian local politicians, who disliked incurring civic expense without genuine proof of public advantage. These happened to be in a minority in Leeds, which in the same year backed other large projects such as installing sewers for the city. Support among the public and interest groups also helped – the Leeds Philosophical and Literary Society was in strong support of the hall, as was the recently formed Leeds Improvement Society (despite its doubts on the council's competence to deliver it). Heaton, its secretary, reminded dissatisfied ratepayers throughout the decade that the Town Hall was important if the city were to discard its image of being an architectural backwater with few buildings of merit.

No one would wish to underestimate the importance of the metropolis, but, after all, it is not in London that we find the best specimens of our English architecture ... It is in what were once provincial cities or hamlets that we discover the most venerable and the most striking memorials of the taste and self-consecration of our forefathers. And the time may come when the archaeologist of a future age will look for the best specimens of the buildings of the present reign, not to the Law Courts or in the Houses of Parliament, but to some provincial towns, where possibly the hurry and rush of life have not been as great as in the capital.

— Thomas Wemyss Reid

Plans and documentation

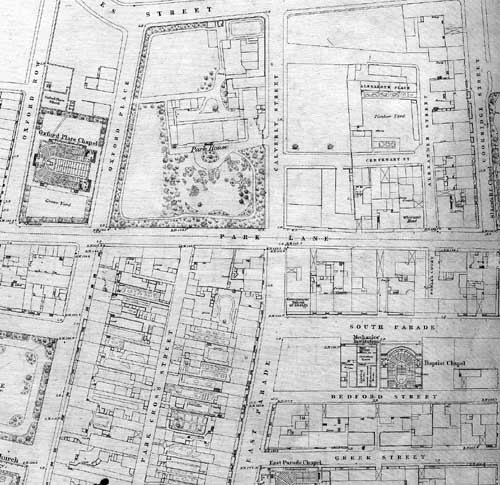
Park Lane in 1847; a small park lies on the site of the Town Hall.

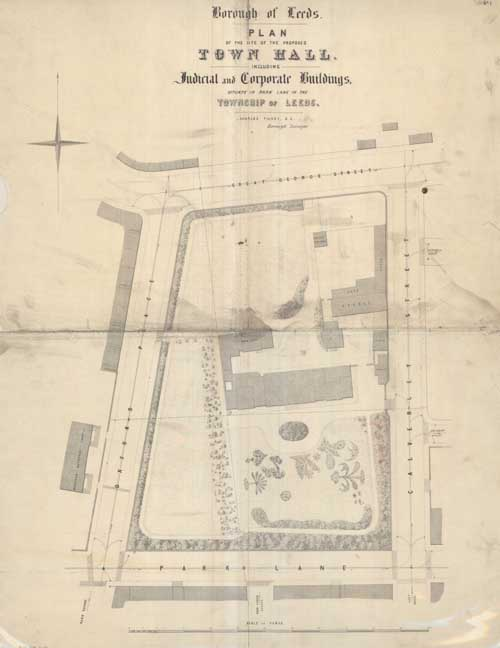
An 1852 map showing Park House, now the site of the Town Hall

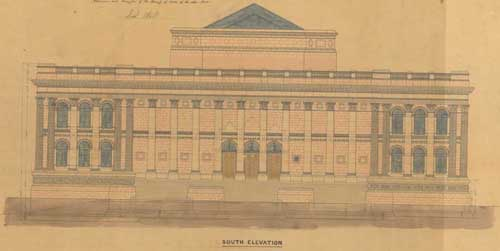
First drawing for the proposed Town Hall (c. 1852)

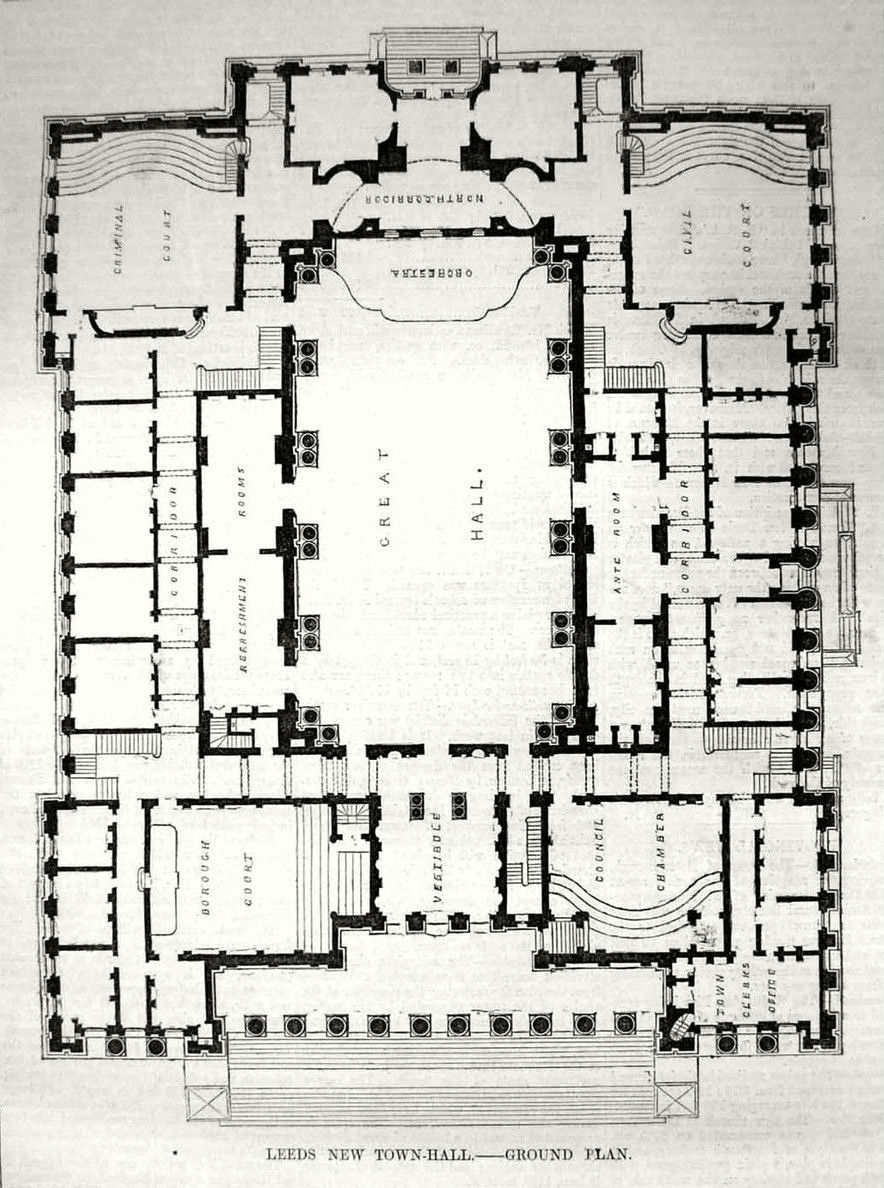
Ground plan of the Town Hall

=== Design ===
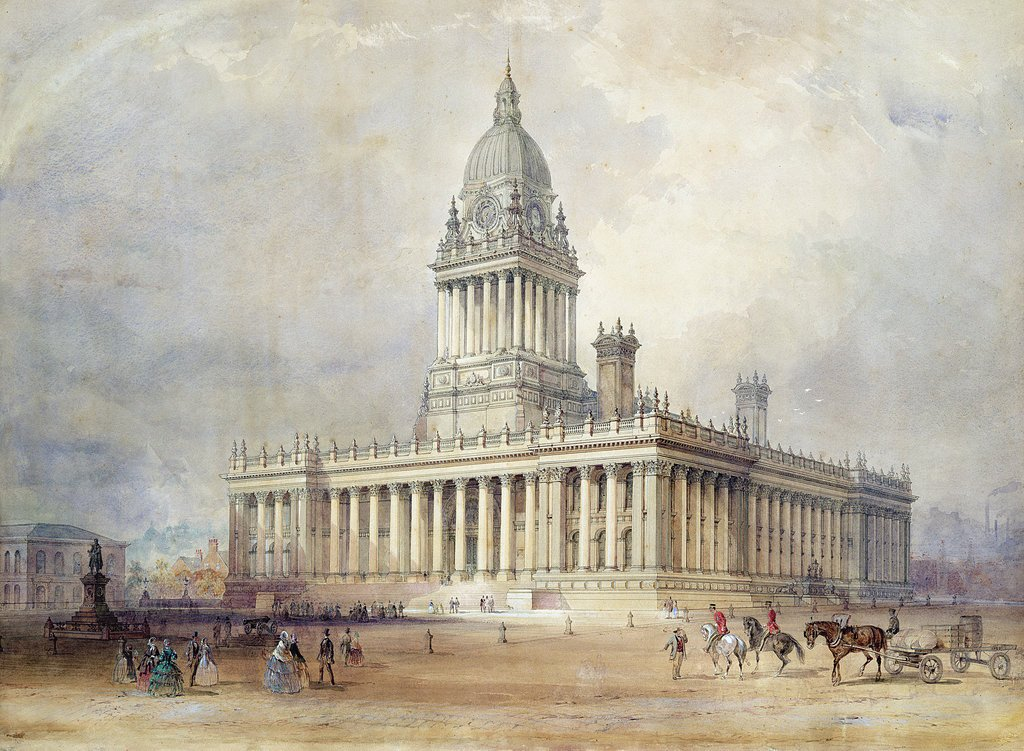
An 1854 watercolour by Cuthbert Brodrick of the planned Town Hall

Leeds Town Council tendered for designs from architects in 1852, in an open competition, a common method of selecting architects for important buildings in the 19th century. The brief was for a kind of building that did not yet exist in England, combining under one roof the functions of moot halls, concert rooms, and courthouses, along with municipal offices and a suite of reception rooms for the mayor. Even the monumental edifice of St George's Hall, Liverpool, only contained a public hall, a small concert hall, and assize courts. The ambitious brief also asked for space for 8,000 people, but the relatively modest budget attracted ridicule, and costs did indeed rise throughout the project. The "Instructions to Architects" made no prescription about which style the design should use, the use of the prevalent Neoclassical style being the unwritten assumption.

Sir Charles Barry, at the time still occupied rebuilding the Palace of Westminster, was persuaded to advise the Town Hall Committee in their judging, which gave the competition considerable status. Premiums of £200, £100, and £50 were awarded to the first, second and third-placed entrants. Only sixteen entries were received, which was fewer than expected, perhaps due to combination of the small prize amounts and the council's non-commitment to employing the winning architect.

Entries were anonymised and entered under noms de plume for impartiality. A design entered under the name "Honor alit Artes" was recommended by Charles Barry, and the contract was revealed to have been won by Cuthbert Brodrick, a young architect from Hull who was unknown outside his home town. He had travelled extensively in Europe in 1844–45 and acquired a love for its classical architecture. He was only twenty-nine when he won the competition for the Town Hall, but later designed some of Victorian Leeds's noted landmarks – the Corn Exchange, Mechanics' Institute and Cookridge Street Swimming Baths.

Second place in the competition was given to the partners Henry Francis Lockwood (under whom Brodrick had trained) and William Mawson, who had designed St George's Hall, Bradford in 1849, and later went on to build Bradford City Hall from 1869.

The major elements of Brodrick's design used a distinctly Roman style, quite different from any of the others submitted, which used a strong entrance colonnade and rectangular plan, and took inspiration from French buildings of recent decades. Barry may have been attracted to its rationality, order, and logic. His first design included recesses on its east and west sides, but this was soon updated with extra offices, resulting in a commanding rectangular mass. The Town Hall Committee initially had reservations after selecting Brodrick, mostly relating to his youth, and asked Barry for confirmation of Brodrick's abilities in the construction of such a large building; Barry responded with high praise: that he was "fully satisfied that the Council might trust [Brodrick] with the most perfect safety", and that "a building constructed according to these plans would be the most perfect gem out of London". Unlike most assessors, Barry continued to show an interest in Brodrick and the progress of the Town Hall under construction. Next, the Committee took the unusual step of insisting in a clause in Brodrick's contract stating that he would receive no payment beyond that of the accepted estimate of £39,000 if the work costs exceeded it. Brodrick agreed to this clause, with the qualification that it would not apply if costs increased for reasons beyond his control, and a sub-committee was formed to "superintend the progress of the works".

No public building so large had been erected in the town before. It has almost as large a footprint as the Temple Works flax mill in Holbeck (1840). Brodrick was also interested in bold new techniques. The roof of the Victoria Hall uses an innovative system of laminated wooden beams, held by wrought-iron bolts, with a 72 ft (22 m) span. This is thought to be the first example in wood, taken from the roof designs of Paxton's Crystal Palace and Lewis Cubitt's King's Cross train shed, both also constructed in the 1850s.

=== Construction ===
==== Building works ====
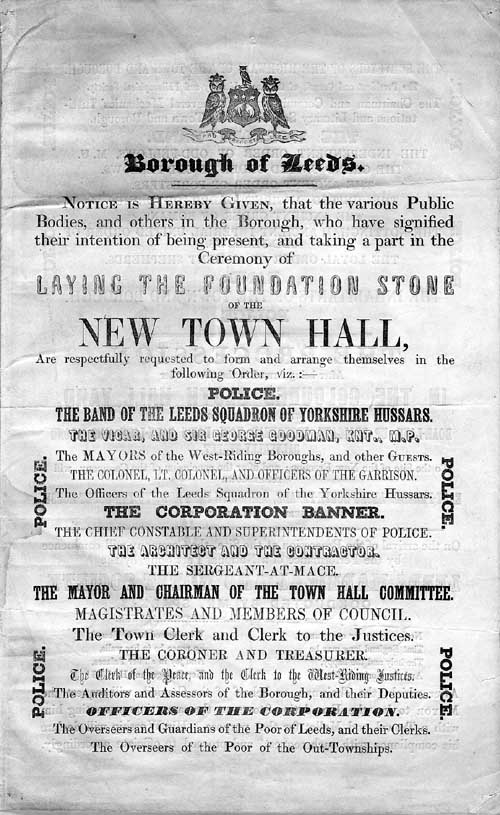
Order of procession for the laying of the foundation stone

On 25 July 1853, the building contract was awarded to Samuel Atack, a Leeds builder and bricklayer, and Benjamin Musgrave, a dyer. It was for £41,835 and included a completion target of 1 January 1856; both elements eventually turned out to have been greatly underestimated. The building is mostly of local Yorkshire stone, but the problems of finding enough large blocks of sufficient quality meant using millstone grit from 17 different quarries, which led to worries about whether the colour would match. Rawdon Hill stone was favoured for those parts of the building on which there would be carving; Derbyshire gritstone formed many of the columns. The foundation stone was laid on 17 August 1853, by the mayor, John Hope Shaw. Sizeable crowds were present at the ceremony, in which the Mayor placed into the stone's cavity some items of the era to form a time capsule, including coins and newspapers, and laid mortar on the stone with a silver trowel (on public display at Leeds City Museum). Subsequent speeches were followed by a long procession consisting of brass bands, Brodrick, magistrates, members of the council, and others. Celebrations continued with a civic banquet, festivities on Woodhouse Moor, and fireworks.

During the works, Brodrick is reported as being "determined to see the scheme through 'whatever the cost'". Extracts from the log-book of the Clerk of Works, James Donaldson, surviving at West Yorkshire Archive Service, reveal Brodrick's insistence on the highest quality of work. Recurrent complaints include slow progress, poor workmanship, poor quality of stone, and insufficient through stones; Atack and Musgrave were more used to building mills than fine, large-scale public buildings. A January 1854 note from the diary records that Musgrave "objected to the dressing of so much of the face of the rubble walling generally and the expensive manner in which [he was] required to execute the wall". In March 1855 "Mr Brodrick was so dissatisfied with the Rawdon Hill stone being used that he took a hammer and destroyed a cornice stone to prevent it being used".

Various other problems beset the project, which faced deadline pressures arising from Queen Victoria's agreement to open the building. Atack fell out with Brodrick early in the construction due to Brodrick's constant redesigning of details and disputes about work not being up to his specifications. Army recruitment for the Crimean War, which began in October 1853, caused a shortage of workmen and a rise in wages. Due to this and it being a period of full employment, the labour force fluctuated throughout the Town Hall's construction, slowing it, much to the architect's and Town Hall Committee's frustration. These problems ultimately led to Atack's bankruptcy in March 1857; several other local contractors were appointed to complete the project.

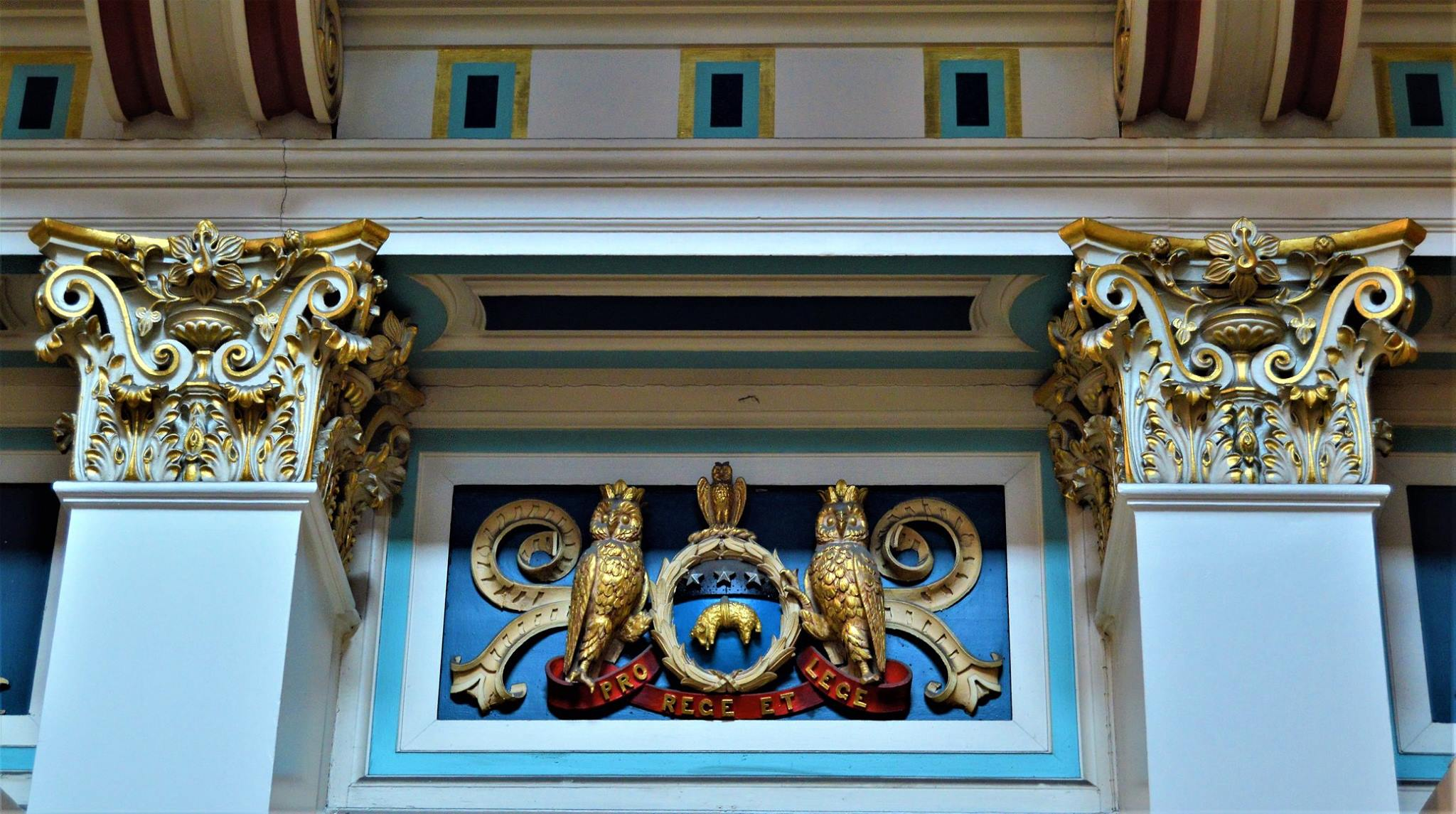
Detail of the unique capitals and a relief of the city arms inside the vestibule

Whatever the council's doubts in the early days, it now appeared determined that nothing was too good for their Town Hall. They provided finance on an unprecedented scale, for mayor's reception rooms described by the historian Derek Linstrum as "splendidly furnished", portraits of William Wilberforce and Charles James Fox, and a marble medallion of Napoleon III and Eugénie. Brodrick participated in all the details of decoration in the public rooms, which each had their own character, though the richest effects were reserved for the Council Chamber in the southeast corner (now known as the Albert Room), which, in addition to the coupled fluted pilasters and ornamented frieze, has an elaborate ceiling incorporating delicately painted glass panels. Though Brodrick's red Morocco upholstered furnishings and the original gallery were removed in the 1930s, the room is a characteristic example of a Classical form of decoration which evidently appealed to Brodrick. Unique variations to the decorative capitals of the interior were devised by Brodrick to express the town's history, including such motifs from the coat of arms of Leeds as pairs of owls, and the ram's head, symbolising the golden fleece on which the prosperity of Leeds was based.

The dominant criticism during the hall's construction was its cost – the council originally granted £39,000 for construction (increased from the 1851 grant of £22,000), but Atak's contract was for a sum of £41,835, a cost increase caused by rising prices of labour and materials. The total cost, after all structural and decoration contracts, is estimated to be around £125,000 (about £13 million in 2025) – and the council had to find extra funding at a time when there was great poverty among Leeds's working classes.

==== Design revisions ====
There were many design revisions during the construction, such as the inclusion of an organ, which came to be regarded as the crowning glory; town halls elsewhere followed suit. Another example is the ventilation turrets (now considered part of its character but which caused alarm when they first appeared) and the vases on the roof parapet, which Brodrick only requested the extra money for from the council after trial ornaments had been ordered. Brodrick never shied from asking for additional sums to perfect his building, so was fortunate for there to be a council majority for building to the highest standards.

The most controversial modification was the inclusion of the tower. A precedent existed for them on public buildings at Liverpool Town Hall and the Royal Exchange, London. A design of a tower by Brodrick, to cost £6,000, was rejected in February 1853, but it was debated at great length and the proposal resurfaced in September 1854 with a cost limitation of £7,000, but this was again defeated by the council. Opponents of the tower used the argument that "a tower would cost money and would only be good to look at, not to use". Proponents, led again by Dr John Deakin Heaton, wrote about the Continental associations of a grand and impressive town hall. He hoped that visitors would come to Leeds to see the Town Hall, and that a tower, at a few additional thousand pounds, would provide the building with beauty beyond "mere utilitarianism".

The following February, a compromise was reached when the Council voted to allow "a form of roof construction which might eventually permit the erection of a tower if at any time it should be thought desirable to do so". It was not until March 1856 that a tower (for £5,500) was formally approved by a majority of nineteen. It would take the form of a cupola supported on columns akin to the Corinthian columns of the south facade. It is likely that Brodrick designed a tower before building even started, as suggested by such facts as its support from influential lobbyists from the outset, and the foundation walls being enlarged prematurely so that one could be added. Charles Barry too had suggested a cupola or small tower in early stages, to divert attention from an arched glazed roof which showed above the parapet.

A firm named Addy and Nicholls was appointed contractors for the tower and interior work. The tower was not completed until after the Town Hall's official opening, with a 4 long tons 1 cwt (9,100 lb or 4.1 t) bell cast by John Warner & Sons hung in 1860, closely followed by the clock mechanism, installed by Dent of London (the dials designed by Edmund Beckett Denison, installed by Potts) one storey above the bell. The grand entrance hall originally envisaged, with a screen of columns leading to the great hall, had to be abandoned in favour of a cramped vestibule to support the tower above, but this was considered a worthy price for the extra drama and power a tower would provide.

The film-maker Jonathan Meades reflected that the "symbolic, representative function of Leeds Town Hall increased during the period of its gestation and construction. In Brodrick's earlier scheme, the only thing that rose above its uninflected parapet was a low storey reminiscent of a theatre's fly tower in the centre. A magnificently sullen, passive building was transformed into a magnificently sullen, aggressive one, at the behest of the hall's promoters".

==== Later changes ====
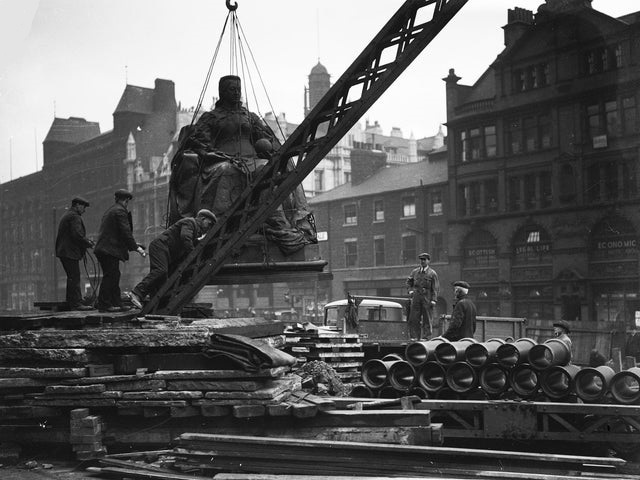
The Queen Victoria Statue being uprooted from Victoria Square where it had stood for over 30 years

Further modifications to the Town Hall continued to be made after its opening, beginning with the entrance steps being changed in part to semi-circular in the 1860s, Brodrick suggesting in 1867 that a larger skylight be put in each of the courts, and then, later in the same year, the placing of the four sculpted lions along the south front. Brodrick's final touches to the Town Hall, the lions are the work of William Day Keyworth Jr of Hull, and each is made from two pieces of Portland stone with zig-zag joints. Evidence of Brodrick's early interest in lion sculptures is documented in travel sketches from his European tour, at San Lorenzo Cathedral and the Palazzo dell'Università in Genoa, and the monument to Clement XIII in St Peter's, Rome.

Inside the Victoria Hall, a gallery was added in 1874 and then replaced in 1890 by the current design by William Henry Thorp (1852–1944); there was also an 1894 redecoration of the Victoria Hall by John Dibblee Crace in a buff and white colour scheme, replacing his father J G Crace's 1857 green colours. In 1905, a memorial to Queen Victoria by George Frampton was unveiled in Victoria Square to the south front, replacing a fountain, while the number of windows on the Calverley Street and Victoria Square corner was increased from three to five. In 1907, a new grand stair was built down to the basement. During the 1930s, original fittings, including a gallery designed by Brodrick, were lost in an enlargement of the classical Council Chamber. Victoria Square was altered again in 1937 with the removal of three statues, of Victoria, Robert Peel, and the Duke of Wellington, to Woodhouse Moor one mile from the city centre. At the same time the curved entrance steps were changed back to a straight set.

=== Opening ===
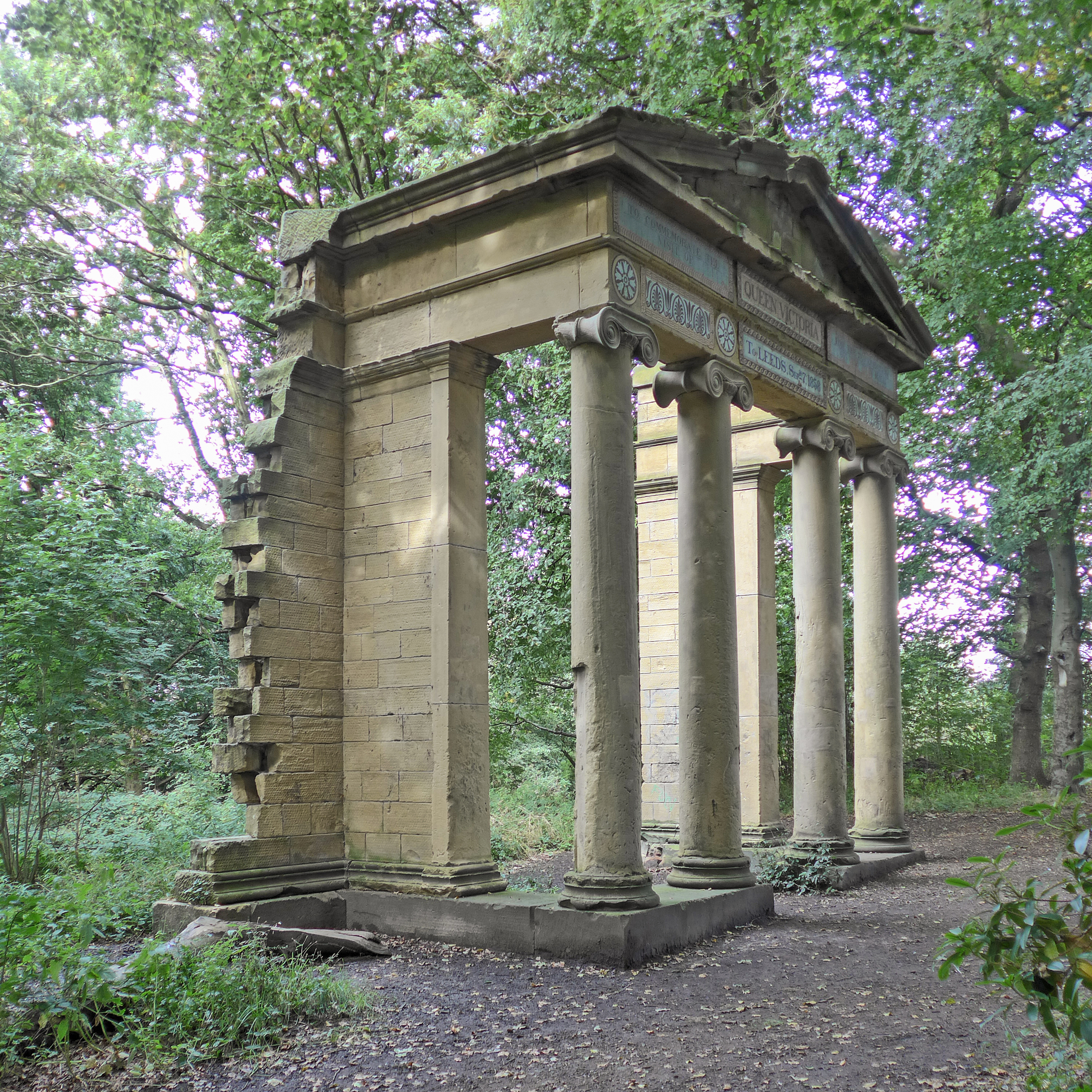
Victoria Arch, Beckett Park, moved here in 1858 to commemorate the Queen's opening of the Town Hall

To see the thousands of spectators,
Round about the New Town Hall,
Butchers, bakers, hotel-waiters,
Tinkers, tailors, snobs and all,
Children pouting, women shouting,
To see the sight they all do run,
Some are busy picking pockets,
Some do take them as they come. — Popular song of the time which encapsulated the scene

Despite the cost overrunning more than threefold, Leeds Town Council considered the Town Hall a great investment and celebrated its new centrepiece. Arrangements for the Town Hall's opening were made well in advance. On 6 September 1858, the Queen arrived at Leeds Central railway station, met by crowds estimated to number 400,000 to 600,000. The council had even established a sub-committee for street decorations – flags, banners and streamers lined the streets of the city. She stayed the night at Woodsley House on Clarendon Road, the home of the Mayor, Peter Fairbairn, with tight military security. The day was combined with an exhibition of local manufactures, held in the Cloth Hall, and a music festival. William Sterndale Bennett was appointed conductor and was commissioned to write a pastoral The May Queen for the occasion. The festival opened with Mendelssohn's Elijah and closed with Handel's Messiah. Leeds City Police were reinforced with officers from the West Riding, Bradford, London and Birmingham. Local reporters delightedly proclaimed that on that day, as the head of the Empire was in Leeds, the town was briefly her capital.

The building was officially opened on 7 September by Queen Victoria and Prince Albert, though the tower was still incomplete. Vast crowds turned out to watch the royal procession, including 32,000 schoolchildren assembled on Woodhouse Moor. She proceeded from the Mayor's home down Woodhouse Lane to the city centre and back up to the top of East Parade where a temporary triumphal arch had been constructed to frame the building. The route had been carefully planned so Victoria and Albert could see much of the town without glimpsing the new Town Hall. With a red carpet and military band on the steps, they entered the building, she knighted the Mayor, and then the hall was declared open on her behalf by the Prime Minister, the Earl of Derby. Later, the Queen was escorted to Wellington station to travel north to Balmoral.

On 22 September 1858, only a fortnight after the opening of the Town Hall, the British Association for the Advancement of Science held its annual meeting in Leeds. For many years Leeds had wanted to host a meeting of the British Association, and the building of a large hall made this possible. Since then many meetings, conferences, and exhibitions have been held in the Town Hall. In the 19th century, some major trials were held here, including those of Charles Peace in 1879, and Kate Dover in 1882.

The Town Hall and entirely new Victoria Square, built on the site of a single house and garden, and which when completed was completely outsize for what was a residential area, effectively altered the balance of the whole town and led to a great development northwards and westwards from City Square, the former centre.

=== 20th century ===
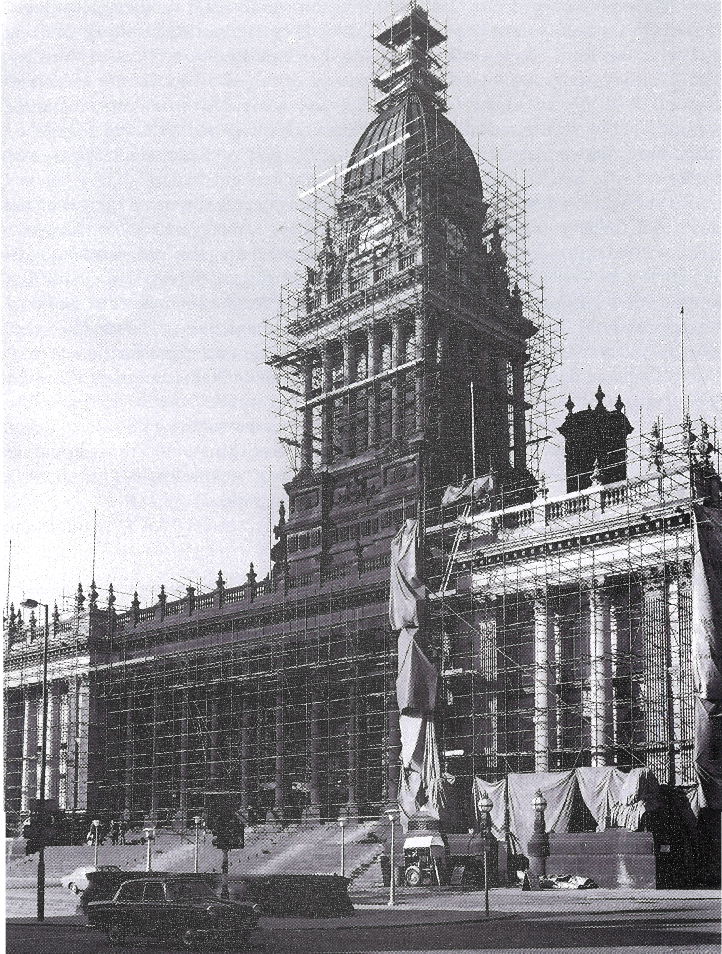
The Town Hall during its spring 1972 clean-up

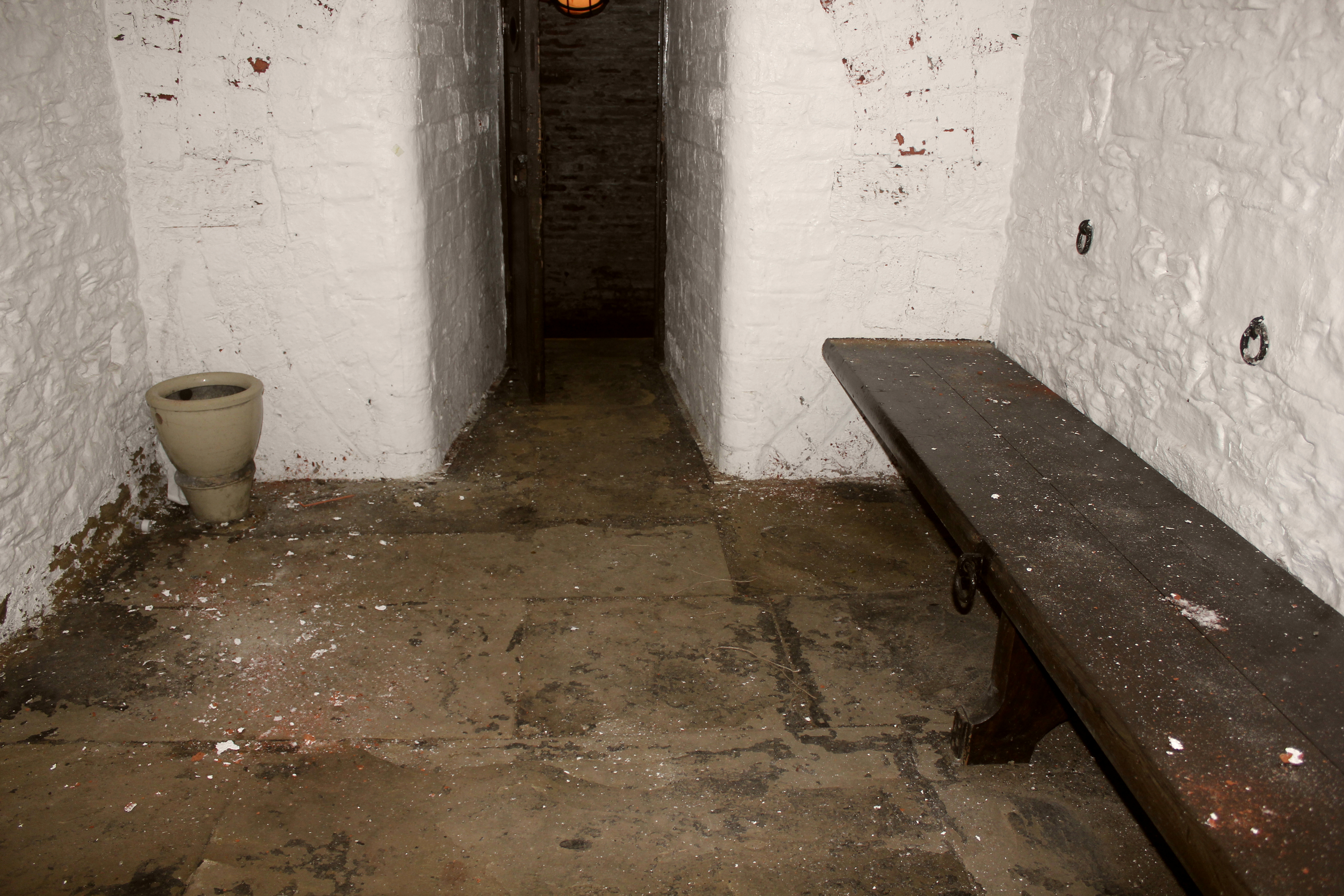
The former police cells under the Town Hall steps. Since 1993 these have been out of use and a visitor attraction.

Leeds Civic Hall, on a nearby site further up Calverley Street, was commissioned in 1929 in a Keynesian project intended to provide work for the local unemployed. The Civic Hall opened in 1933 as the seat of Leeds City Council; the Council Chamber of the Town Hall was converted to a courtroom.

On 14 and 15 March 1941, Leeds was bombed by the Luftwaffe. Houses were destroyed in inner-city districts and bombs dropped on the city centre, hitting the east side of the Town Hall, causing significant damage to its roof and walls on Calverley Street. The damage was repaired shortly after, but evidence still remains in Victoria Gardens. For the duration of World War II, the Town Hall crypt housed an ARP post and from 1942 a British Restaurant, where people could enjoy cheap, hot food, which proved popular after the war, being refurbished in 1960 before closing in 1966.

In 1951, the Town Hall was designated a Grade I listed building, a status applied to structures of exceptional architectural and historic interest, and which offers statutory protection against unauthorised demolition or modification.

A fire damaged the courtroom in 1991. In 1993, Leeds Combined Court Centre opened on Westgate, ending the Town Hall's role as a courthouse; its police station and cells (Bridewell) were closed at the same time. During its time as Leeds Assizes and later the Crown Court, the Town Hall held various notable cases, including the conviction and life-sentencing of Stefan Kiszko for the murder of Lesley Molseed in 1976 (later quashed) and the conviction of Zsiga Pankotia for the murder of Jack Eli Myers in 1961. Pankotia became the last man to be hanged at Armley Gaol.

For much of the 20th century, the Town Hall was left blackened by soot and smoke from the industrial city surrounding it. In spring 1972 the building was given its first official clean-up – on previous occasions it had been hosed down by the fire brigade – which revealed much of the detailed stonework. This was strongly opposed by the Leeds Civic Trust, which preferred that its blackness "should stand as a symbol of the city's industrial past and as a reminder to future generations of the air pollution which the city is so successfully combatting".

=== 21st century ===
A major refurbishment project of the whole building commenced in 2019, funded by Leeds City Council's capital fund, with a public campaign funding some interior renovation costs. The three-year works will provide new seating and soundproofing, new bars and public event spaces in previously blocked-off rooms, comprehensive interior redecoration, modifications to two chandeliers to use dimmable LEDS, relocation of the box office to the ground level. The Scottish firm Page\Park Architects is responsible for all scheme designs. Works are also taking place to the clock tower and roof, including replacement of all tiles with Welsh slate; the roof project is being designed and managed by NPS Group. As part of the roof works, contractors discovered on the 225 ft (69 m) dome a plaque dated 1861 placed by the last men to work on it. The plaque reads: "This dome was stripped and old lead put on after by Herbert Westcombe and Joseph Nett". The building is scheduled to reopen in 2022 in time for the Leeds 2023 city-wide cultural festival.

The closure of Leeds Town Hall in November 2021 for refurbishment and conservation work provided an opportunity for extensive work on the Leeds Town Hall organ. The familiar casework and some of the pipes are being retained and repaired but all of the organ's mechanism, console and about a third of its 6,500 pipes are being made new.

In 2019, a time capsule was installed in the clock tower, assembled by a group of young people working with Leeds Museums and Galleries. The capsule contains items such as a Nando's menu, nine Lego minifigures, a mobile phone, Leeds Owl artwork and a Refugee Education Training Advice Service cookery book donated by a woman who moved from Syria to Leeds in 2018.

== Present usage ==
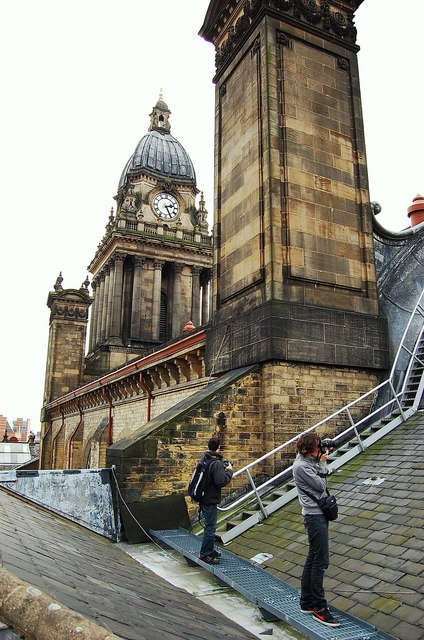
Town Hall roof detail, including colonnaded clock tower, ventilation turrets and part of the laminated wood trussed roof

Despite its original purpose as the seat of local government in Leeds being taken over by subsequent council buildings, the Town Hall retains an active role in the civic and cultural life of the city. Conferences, weddings, and civil partnerships take place in the Albert Room and the Brodrick Suite, which have been converted from the former courtroom and Council Chamber and are home to a register office. The opulent Victoria Hall is a venue for many performances – its 6,600-pipe organ is still the largest three-manual example in Europe – regular lunchtime organ recitals are given by City Organist Simon Lindley and others, while a full programme of music, comedy, and exhibitions uses this main space year-round. Several recurring cultural events use the Town Hall such as Leeds International Concert Season, the triennial Leeds International Piano Competition, and the Leeds International Film Festival. Other events include Leeds International Beer Festival, a four-day annual festival celebrating and promoting craft beer.

The Town Hall is as a landmark and heritage asset; guided tours of the building, visiting areas not usually open to the public, are occasionally given. Remaining historic features include the old borough courtroom, which has wooden benches and stairs leading down from the dock into the basement – now a storage area but was originally the bridewell (prison cells), located under the front steps. Also accessible only on the tours is the clock tower, entered via 203 spiral steps and which houses the original Potts & Sons quarter-chiming, four faced clock.

Leeds Town Hall has been used as a location for several films and television programmes, supported by Screen Yorkshire. It was used in the opening scenes of the 2016 film Dad's Army while The New Statesman, Peaky Blinders, Residue, National Treasure, and The ABC Murders TV series are among productions which have used interior and exterior shots.

== Appraisal ==
Much has been written about the building's importance as a heritage asset for the City of Leeds and the nation. Representing an evolution in the civic growth of Leeds from a market town to a major city, the Town Hall is the legacy of the citizens and leaders of its time who managed to express Leeds's increasing wealth and importance. Its tower, often used as a symbol of Leeds, was described by Colin Cunningham, an academic, as "a remarkably assured and individualistic design which has no obvious precedents", and is the subject of a protected view in local planning policy, ensuring no new tall buildings will block the long-range views of it across the western side of the city centre.

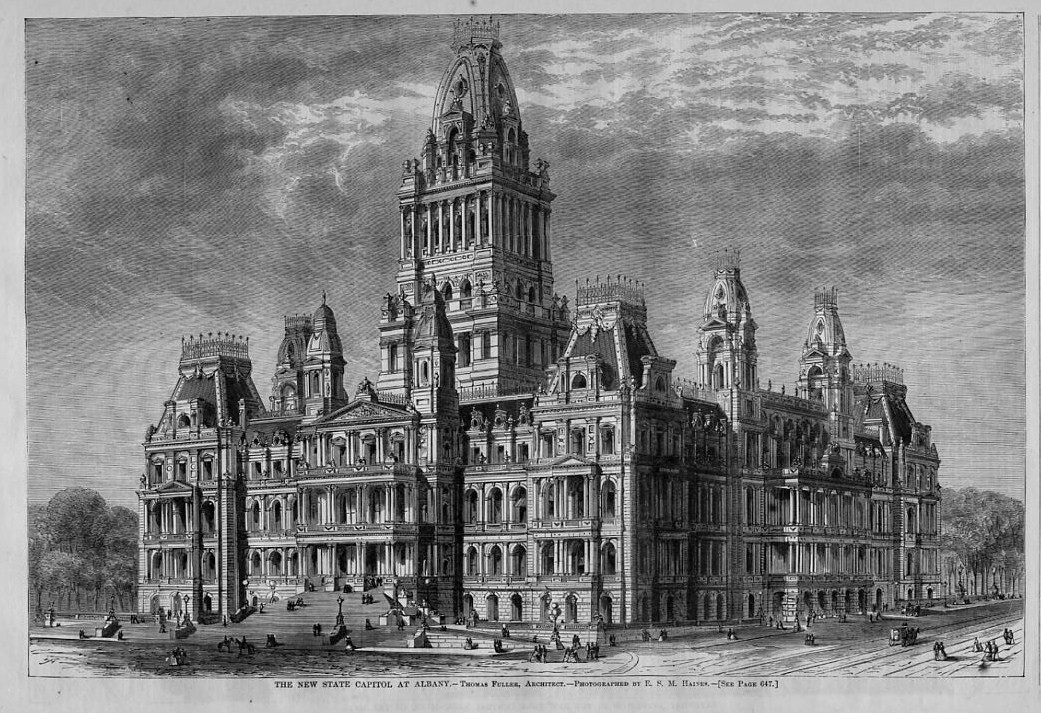
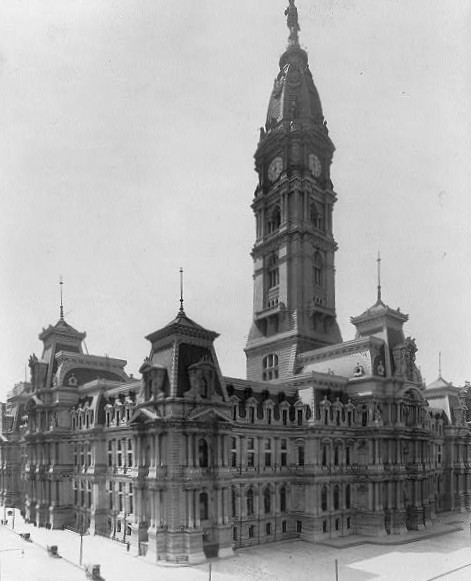
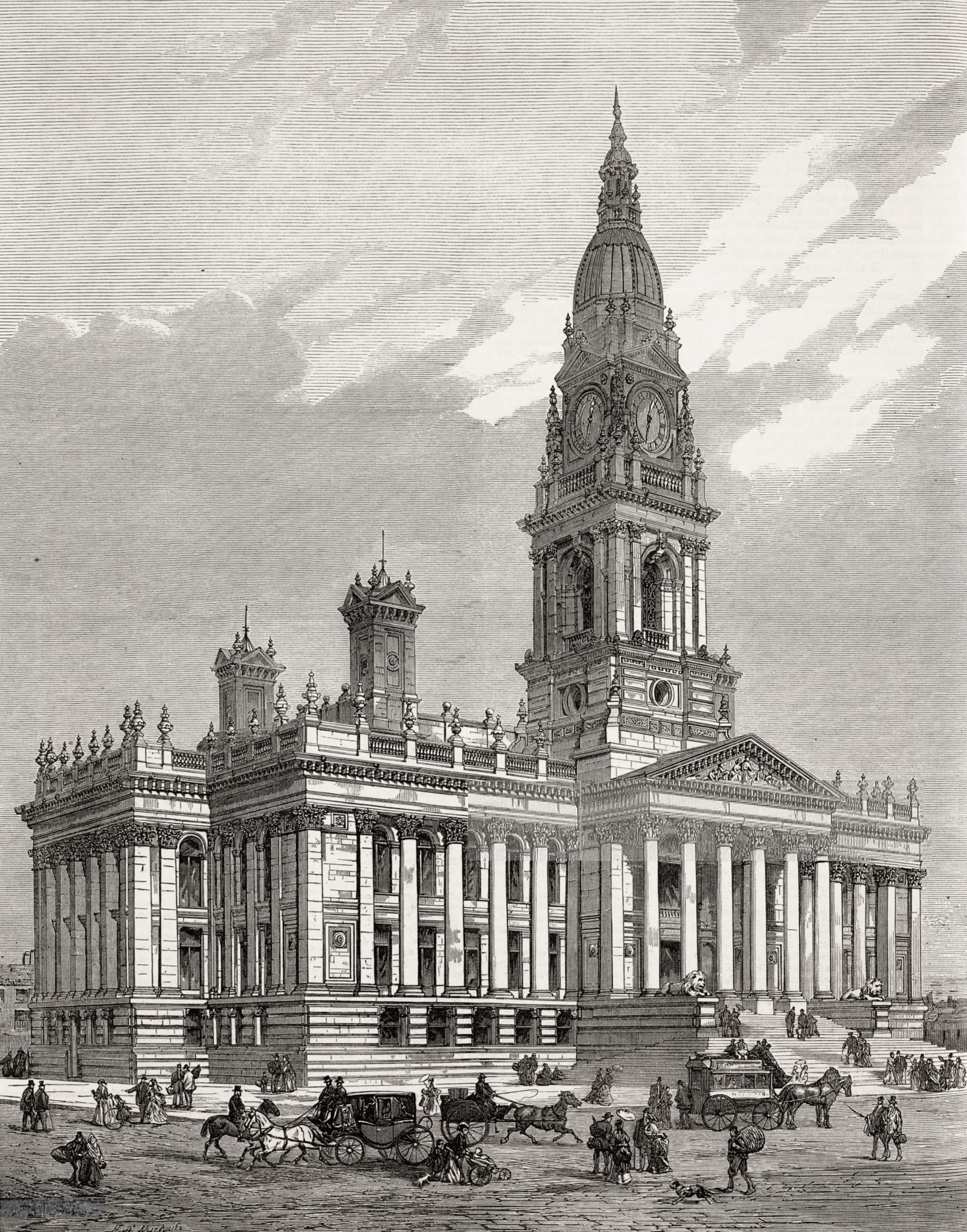
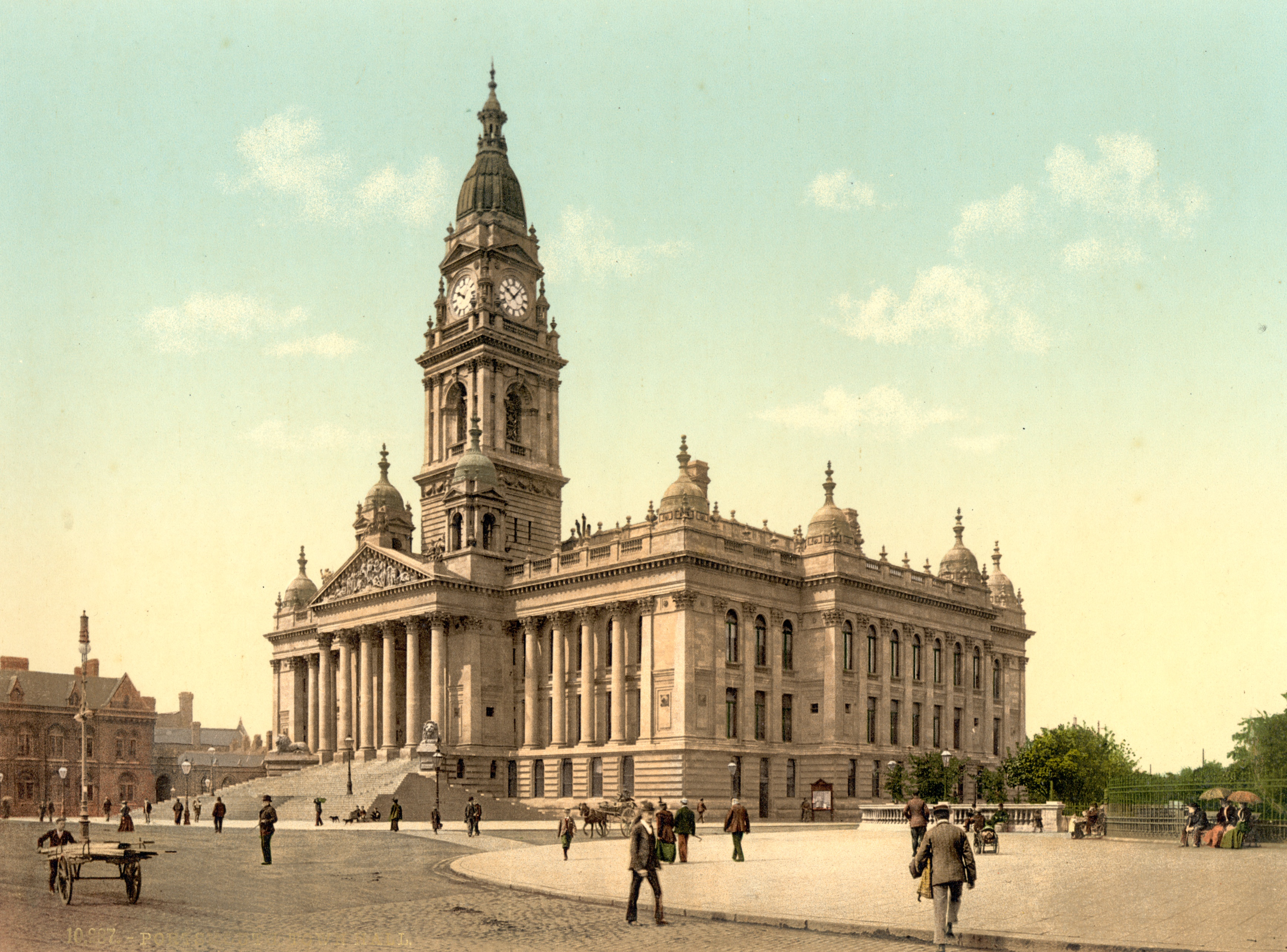
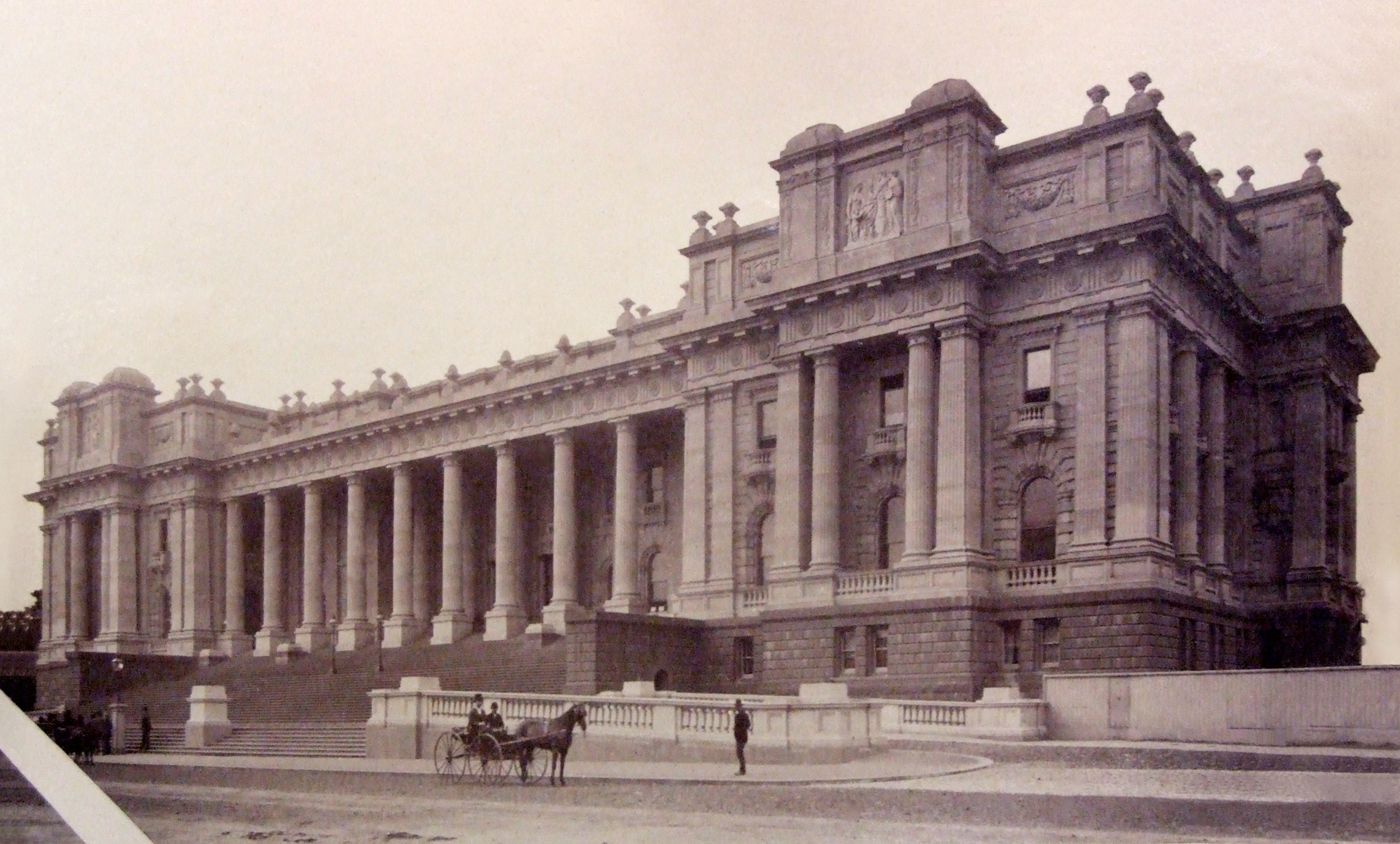
19th century views of other public buildings which take their architecture from the legacy of Brodrick's Leeds Town Hall. Clockwise from top left: New York State Capitol, Philadelphia City Hall, Portsmouth Guildhall, Parliament House, Melbourne, Bolton Town Hall.

Leeds Town Hall has been used as a model for civic buildings across Britain and the British Empire, being one of the largest and earliest. In particular, Bolton Town Hall in Greater Manchester (1873) and Portsmouth Guildhall in Hampshire (1890), both works by the Leeds architect and Brodrick student William Hill (1827–1889), take many of their design cues from Leeds Town Hall. Another significant appropriation of its form – the square plan with a neoclassical design and tower – is Parliament House, Melbourne (revised design 1879), as are other colonial examples such as Parliament House, Adelaide (1880s), and in South Africa, Cape Town City Hall (1893) and Durban City Hall (1885). Additionally, many Americans reportedly travelled to Leeds especially to see the Town Hall after its opening, which some venerated as highly as medieval cathedrals. The composition of a building with end pavilions and a dominating central tower was adopted for example at Philadelphia City Hall (John McArthur Jr., 1871–1901), which has struck architectural historians as the ultimate expansion of Brodrick's idea of a domed tower, crowned with a great statue of William Penn, while the first design for the New York State Capitol followed a similar layout and a tower which featured a close resemblance to Leeds Town Hall's.

In 1857, prior to opening, the following remarks on Leeds Town Hall were made by two Liverpool architects at a meeting of the Liverpool Architectural and Archaeological Society:

Mr J. A. Picton stated that he had an opportunity of inspecting the new Town Hall. Externally it was not so imposing as St George's Hall, Liverpool, but internally it was a work of equally great merit. The laying of it out was equal to anything he had ever seen, and superior to their own hall in that respect. The two defects of St George's Hall were the meanness of the entrances and the darkness of the corridors, both of which were obviated in the building at Leeds. The building was in every respect highly creditable to the builder.
Mr H. P. Horner confirmed its fitness for the purpose was externally was superior to St George's Hall, and overcame the objections made to buildings of a classical character as to the necessity for the introduction of windows. The interior would be in many respects superior, more particularly in reference to the lighting. In every respect the Leeds Town Hall was the most successful building that had been raised during the present century.

— Leeds Intelligencer, 21 November 1857

About a century after its opening, the architectural historian Nikolaus Pevsner wrote: "Leeds can be proud of its town hall, one of the most convincing buildings of its date in the country and of the classical buildings of its date no doubt the most successful." Pevsner was more hesitant to praise the tower, writing "the architect has not quite made up his mind whether he wanted a dome like those of the Greenwich Hospital or a tower".

In a never-broadcast 1960s BBC film about the changing architecture of Leeds, the poet John Betjeman, known for his love of Victorian architecture, praised the town hall.

A 2007 BBC programme presented by Jonathan Meades profiled Cuthbert Brodrick and appraised the architecture of Leeds Town Hall. Meades said

Leeds Town Hall is an unforgettable sight. There is a remarkable tension between the counter-intuitive tower and the body of the building. This tension is not merely between the vertical and the horizontal, there is also a calculated stylistic change. The building itself uses the device of columns and pilasters monotonously. [...] Domes are not meant to be concave. There is some terrible abnormality here, it's like a Satanic freakshow devised by Beardsley, or by Victor Hugo, who wrote "deformity is akin to sublimity". Indeed, the building's entire exterior exhibits a taste for monstrous perversity in stone. Brodrick exploited [Millstone Grit's] properties from the outset. It cannot be worked delicately. It lends itself to gigantism, solidity, and this sort of rustication – vermicular, that is, it's in the form of worms. [...] It tells us that the city state of Leeds will exist long after its current crop of citizens is dead. This building puts us in our place as surely as any great cathedral.

—

In November 2008, Leeds Town Hall and the town halls of Halifax, Paisley, Burslem, Hornsey, Manchester, Lynton, Dunfermline, Fordwich and Much Wenlock were selected as the "ten town halls to visit" by Architecture Today. It commented: "The epitome of northern civic bombast, Leeds' municipal palace has a grandeur that helps sustain the city's sense of its own importance. Its architect, Cuthbert Brodrick, also contributed the Corn Exchange and City Museum before disappearing into obscurity".

== See also ==
- Architecture of Leeds
- List of tallest buildings and structures in Leeds
- Leeds Civic Hall, the successor building for Leeds City Council's civic functions
- Grade I listed buildings in West Yorkshire
- Listed buildings in Leeds (City and Hunslet Ward - northern area)

Records
| Preceded by Cathedral Church of St Marie; 60 m (200 ft) | Tallest building in Yorkshire; 1868 – 1965 | Succeeded by Arts Tower; 78 m (256 ft) |
| Preceded by Leeds Minster; 42 m (138 ft) | Tallest building in Leeds; 1868 – 1966 | Succeeded by Park Plaza Hotel; 77 m (253 ft) |
