= John Ashworth (judge) =

British judge and barrister

Sir John Percy Ashworth, MBE, DL (3 February 1906 – 26 September 1975) was a British judge and barrister.

== Biography ==
He was the son of Percy Ashworth of Ollerton, Bolton and Fradswell Hall, Stafford, and his wife Annie Isabel Brooks, daughter of John Close Brooks of Birtles Hall. He was educated at Sandroyd School then Winchester College before going to Christ Church, Oxford. In 1930 he became a barrister of the Inner Temple. In 1940 he became an intelligence officer.

Ashworth served as Junior Counsel to the Treasury (Common Law) (one of the British government's most senior lawyers) from 1950 to 1954, and was a Judge of the High Court of Justice of England and Wales from 1954 till his death. Among the cases that he adjudged was the murder of John Alan West by Gwynne Evans and Peter Allen: this resulted in the last death sentences to be carried out in the United Kingdom.
