= Leeds Combined Court Centre =

Judicial building in Leeds, England

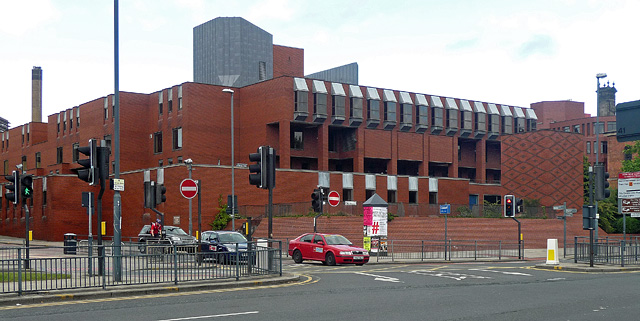
- Leeds Combined Court Centre

- Shown in Leeds
- 53.8003°N 1.5519°W
- Location: Oxford Row, Leeds

History
- Built: 1982

Site notes
- Architect: Property Services Agency
- Architectural style: Modern style

Leeds Combined Court Centre is a Crown Court venue, which deals with criminal cases, and a County Court venue, which deals with civil cases, in Oxford Row, Leeds, West Yorkshire, England. It is adjacent to Leeds Magistrates Courts.

== History ==
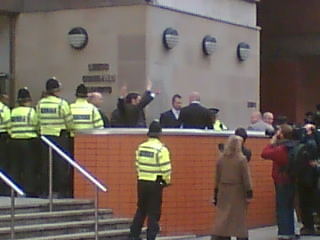
Nick Griffin leaves Leeds Crown Court

Until the 1970s, the assizes and quarter sessions in Leeds were held in Leeds Town Hall. However, as the number of court cases in Leeds grew, it became necessary to commission a dedicated courthouse, both for criminal and civil matters. The site selected by the Lord Chancellor's Department was based around a narrow lane known as "Oxford Street" which branched off Westgate to the north.

The Leeds Combined Court Centre was designed by the Property Services Agency in the modern style, built in red brick at a cost of £9.7 million, and was completed in 1982. The design of the complex involved an asymmetrical main frontage of eight bays facing onto Westgate. The main entrance was established in the Oxford Row, and the Westgate frontage was fenestrated by a distinctive row of 16 modern oriel windows on the second floor. The complex, which was intended to accommodate the Crown Court (for criminal cases) and the County Court (for civil cases), was built with five courtrooms and was subsequently supplemented by additional accommodation at Coverdale House in East Parade providing another seven courtrooms.

== Notable cases ==
=== As Leeds Assizes ===
Notable cases heard at the court have been:

- Zsiga Pankotia – found guilty of murder, becoming the last man to be hanged at Armley Gaol, in 1961.

=== As Leeds Crown Court ===
- John Poulson – found guilty of fraud and sentenced to five years imprisonment (later increased to seven years) in 1974.
- Stefan Kiszko – found guilty of the murder of Lesley Molseed and wrongfully sentenced to life imprisonment in 1976.
- Gary Hart – found guilty of causing death by dangerous driving in connection with the Selby rail crash and sentenced to five years imprisonment in 2001.
- Nick Griffin – acquitted of incitement to racial hatred in 2006.
- Wearside Jack – The Yorkshire Ripper hoaxer, found guilty of perverting the course of justice and sentenced to eight years imprisonment in 2006.
- John Darwin – canoeist, who faked his own death in a life insurance fraud, found guilty and sentenced to six years imprisonment in 2008.
- Karen Matthews and Michael Donovan – found guilty of the kidnapping of Shannon Matthews, child neglect and perverting the course of justice and sentenced to eight years imprisonment in 2008.
- Will Cornick – found guilty of the murder of his teacher, Ann Maguire, and sentenced to life imprisonment in 2014.
- Colin Gregg – heir to Greggs bakery chain and former headmaster, found guilty of sexually abusing four boys and sentenced to 13½ years imprisonment (later reduced by the Court of Appeal to 8½ years) in 2017.
