= Homicide Act 1957 =

Act of the Parliament of the United Kingdom modifying offence of murder

Homicide Act 1957 (Note: Section 17(1).)
- Act of Parliament
- Parliament of the United Kingdom
- Long title: An Act to make for England and Wales (and for courts-martial wherever sitting) amendments of the law relating to homicide and the trial and punishment of murder, and for Scotland amendments of the law relating to the trial and punishment of murder and attempts to murder.
- Citation: 5 & 6 Eliz. 2. c. 11
- Territorial extent: England and Wales; Scotland; (Note: Section 17(3).)

Dates
- Royal assent: 21 March 1957
- Commencement: 21 March 1957 (Note: The Acts of Parliament (Commencement) Act 1793.)
Other legislation
Amends	Criminal Law (Scotland) Act 1829; Criminal Law (Scotland) Act 1830; Offences Against the Person Act 1861; Capital Punishment Amendment Act 1868; Children and Young Persons Act 1933; Criminal Justice Act 1948; Criminal Justice (Scotland) Act 1949; Army Act 1955; Air Force Act 1955; Naval Discipline Act 1957
Amended by	Suicide Act 1961; Murder (Abolition of Death Penalty) Act 1965; Statute Law (Repeals) Act 1973; Statute Law (Repeals) Act 1974; Statute Law (Repeals) Act 1977; Armed Forces Act 2006; Coroners and Justice Act 2009

Status: Amended

Text of statute as originally enacted

Revised text of statute as amended

Text of the Homicide Act 1957 as in force today (including any amendments) within the United Kingdom, from legislation.gov.uk.

The Homicide Act 1957 (5 & 6 Eliz. 2. c. 11) is an act of the Parliament of the United Kingdom. It was enacted as a partial reform of the common law offence of murder in English law by abolishing the doctrine of constructive malice (except in limited circumstances), reforming the partial defence of provocation, and by introducing the partial defences of diminished responsibility and suicide pact. It further restricted the use of the death penalty for murder to particular enumerated circumstances, under the rubrique of capital murder.

Similar provisions to part I of this act was enacted for Northern Ireland by Part II of the Criminal Justice Act (Northern Ireland) 1966. The Act was highly controversial as a hodgepodge partial abolition, which categorically deemed all murder by firearm or during theft, for instance, punishable by death, whereas murder via poison or during rape would not. Dissatisfaction from both abolitionists and proponents of capital punishment was a key factor in passing the subsequent Murder (Abolition of Death Penalty) Act 1965, under the Wilson ministry. For all non-capital forms of murder, the mandatory punishment would be life imprisonment.

== History ==
The act was introduced following the Royal Commission on Capital Punishment 1949–53, and embodied some of its recommendations but differed from the main recommendation which was that "it is impracticable to find a satisfactory method of limiting the scope of capital punishment by dividing murder into degrees". During and after the royal commission there had been several controversial cases, including that of Derek Bentley in 1953 where a 19-year-old defendant was hanged for a murder committed by his 16-year-old co-defendant. (Bentley's conviction was found to be unsafe by the Court of Appeal in 1998) The hanging of Ruth Ellis in 1955 had also caused considerable unease with the system of capital punishment; Ellis had a strong potential defence of diminished responsibility due to previous, but not immediate, abuse by her victim, but as the law did not provide for such a defence to a charge of murder she was sentenced to death, and eventually not reprieved.

In November 1955, after Home Secretary Gwilym Lloyd George announced the government's rejection of some of the royal commission's proposals, veteran MP Sydney Silverman introduced a bill to abolish capital punishment. The Conservative government avoided a vote on it (which would have shown Conservative MPs to be divided), but a debate was held in February 1956 on a government motion and resulted in an abolitionist amendment being carried by 293 to 262. Silverman's bill was then passed by the Commons but vetoed by the House of Lords.

In order to mollify the abolitionists, the government then announced it would bring in a reform to the law to curtail the use of capital punishment.

== Part I – Amendments to the law of England and Wales as to the fact of murder ==
This Part does not extend to Scotland.

=== Section 1 – Abolition of constructive malice ===
Constructive malice was the doctrine that malice aforethought, the mental element for murder, could be attributed to the defendant if death was caused during the commission of another felony (such as robbery or burglary). Section 1 of the Act abolished constructive malice except where the intention implicit in the other crime was an intention to kill or to do grievous bodily harm. Thus, the automatic linkage between the other crime and the murder was broken, and juries were then required to consider more directly whether the accused was culpable when engaging in the conduct resulting in death. But this made the Act unclear in its effect. Although the marginal note to the section purports to abolish the doctrine of "constructive malice", it did not abolish the concept of felony, the rules relating to the arrest of felons or the general rules specifying the test for the mental element which the juries were to apply. Hence, the Act did not abolish the principles of expressed malice or implied malice, i.e. malice could be implied by the words and expressions used by the accused, or there was a set of circumstances from which malice could be implied. These were objective tests that enabled the court to impute or "construct" the malice. This continuing common law was the basis of the decision in DPP v Smith where the Lords confirmed that neither expressed nor implied malice had been repealed by the section. It was not until the Criminal Law Act 1967 abolished the distinction between felonies and misdemeanours that the old common law rules on malice for the proof of mens rea in felonies could no longer apply.

=== Voluntary manslaughter defences ===
The act created two partial defences—diminished responsibility and suicide pact—to murder which, if satisfied, reduce a charge of murder to a charge of manslaughter. It also changed the law of another partial defence to murder provocation.

==== Diminished responsibility ====
In 1953 the report of the Royal Commission on Capital Punishment took the view that mental abnormality which resulted in a diminished responsibility, was relatively common and potentially of importance to a wide range of offences. The commission therefore asserted that a "radical" amendment to the existing law would not be justified for the "limited" purpose of enabling the courts to avoid imposing the death sentence. Parliament was not impressed and section 2 of the act now provides that diminished responsibility is available as a defence where the accused was, at the time of the offence, suffering from an "abnormality of the mind" which substantially impaired his mental responsibility for his acts or omissions resulting in murder. The burden of proof is on the accused to show that she/he was suffering from diminished responsibility.

This defence is distinguishable from the defence of insanity for while the former requires a substantial impairment of mental responsibility arising from an abnormality of the mind, the latter requires a defect of reason arising from a disease of the mind. Broadly, the difference is that diminished responsibility is characterised by a temporary emotional or mental state which causes the accused to lose control over whether and how to act, whereas insanity is any inherent (internal) defect which so radically affects the defendant that he or she does not understand what is being done or that it is legally wrong to do it (other conditions may cause the accused to become an automaton, i.e. to be unable to control her/his body's movements, see automatism and its case law). A further distinction is that the defence of diminished responsibility reduces a murder charge to voluntary manslaughter, whereas the defence of insanity excuses the accused of all guilt (but may require the accused to be placed in special care, say, by imposing a hospital order under section 37 of the Mental Health Act 1983, and automatism results in a complete acquittal.

===== Abnormality of the mind =====
An abnormality of the mind is a "state of mind so different from that of ordinary human beings that the reasonable man would term it abnormal". This can arise from a mental incapacity to reason properly or from an inability to exercise willpower to control physical acts. Examples of an abnormality of the mind included:

- post-natal depression (R v Reynolds [1988])
- battered woman syndrome (R v Ahluwahlia [1992]; R v Hobson [1998])
- excessive jealousy (R v Vinagre [1979])

Intoxication may not constitute an abnormality of the mind unless the craving for alcohol has become involuntary (R v Tandy [1989]). The Coroners and Justice Act 2009 s. 52(1) amended the Homicide Act 1957 to use the phrase "abnormal mental functioning" instead of "abnormal mind" to highlight the psychological focus of this defence.

===== Substantial impairment of mental responsibility =====
There must be a "substantial" impairment of mental responsibility. Whether the impairment is "substantial" is defined either according to a common-sense standard or as "more than some trivial degree of impairment but less than total impairment" (R v Lloyd [1967]).

==== Section 3 – Provocation ====
Provocation can be distinguished from diminished responsibility which recognises a reduction in culpability because the defendant does not have the capacity to choose whether to break the law or not. The defence of provocation was based on the argument that a person who was so provoked as to completely lose their self-control should not be punished in the same way as those who murder wilfully. The defence was available under common law where the accused was provoked to lose his self-control. Provocation could be caused by things done or things the accused heard or said himself. The jury then decided whether the provocation would have been sufficient to cause a reasonable man to lose his self-control. If so, the charge could be reduced from murder to voluntary manslaughter. The accused needed adduce only prima facie evidence of provocation. It was then up to the prosecution to prove beyond reasonable doubt that the accused was not provoked. Two conditions had to be satisfied:

- Subjective condition. For the jury to find provocation, they had to be satisfied that the accused was actually provoked and lost self-control (R v Duffy [1949]). This was a subjective test based solely on the actual effect the behaviour of the victim had on the accused.
- Objective condition. The jury had also to find that the reasonable person would have done as the defendant did (R v Duffy [1949]).

It was thus possible for a person to have been subjectively provoked but not objectively provoked (e.g. a particularly sensitive person) or to have been objectively provoked but not subjectively provoked (e.g. a particular insensitive person). It was also possible for the provocation to have been built up over a period of time, provided that the outburst was sudden and temporary (R v Ahluwalia [1992]).

Section 3 of the act made "the question whether the provocation was enough to make a reasonable man do as he did" the jury's responsibility. Previously this decision could be withdrawn from the jury by the judge.

In 2004 the Law Commission recommended substantial revision to this defence in their report on Partial Defences to Murder. Section 3 was repealed on 4 October 2010 by section 56(2)(a) of the Coroners and Justice Act 2009.

==== Suicide pact ====
Parliament's intention in section 4 was to show some compassion for those who had been involved in a suicide pact but failed to die. The reason for the failure might be that the means adopted proved inadequate or the survivor's commitment was fragile. In either event, the trauma of involvement in such a pact was considered equivalent to a punishment and the mandatory life sentence of murder was considered an inappropriate sentence for such defendants. Thus the act provides that where the accused kills a person, or is party to a person being killed, while acting in accordance with a suicide pact, the charge will be reduced from murder to manslaughter. A 'suicide pact' is a common agreement between two or more persons providing for the death of all those persons (whether they should take their own lives or those of each other). It is a requirement of the defence that the accused herself/himself had a "settled intention of dying in pursuance of the pact". This is to avoid the accused entering into a supposed pact with the real intention of committing murder. The burden is on the accused to prove that she/he:

1. was party to a suicide pact, and
2. had a settled intention of dying.

== Part II – Liability to the death penalty ==
Until the Homicide Act was passed, the mandatory penalty for all adults convicted of murder was death by hanging. After decades of campaigning, abolitionists secured a partial victory with the Act, which limited the circumstances in which murderers could be executed, requiring mandatory life imprisonment in all other cases.

=== Section 5 – Capital murder ===
This section created a new offence of capital murder. A person was guilty of this offence if he committed murder in one of five situations:

- Murder in the course or furtherance of theft; s.5(1)(a)
- Murder by shooting or by causing an explosion; s.5(1)(b)
- Murder in the course or for the purpose of resisting, avoiding or preventing a lawful arrest, or of effecting or assisting an escape or rescue from legal custody; s.5(1)(c)
- Murder of a police officer acting in the execution of his duty, or of a person assisting a police officer so acting; s.5(1)(d)
- Murder of a prison officer acting in the execution of his duty, or of a person assisting a prison officer so acting, by a person who was a prisoner at the time when he did or was a party to the murder; s.5(1)(e).

Forms of indictment for this offence were provided by S.I. 1957/699.

=== Section 6 – Death penalty for repeated murders ===
This section required the death penalty for anyone convicted of two murders. There were two subsections:

- Two murders committed on separate occasions, provided both murders were committed in Great Britain; s.6(1)
- The murder of two or more people being charged in the same indictment; s.6(2)

=== Section 7 – Abolition of the death penalty for other murders ===
This section abolished the death penalty for anyone convicted of a murder that did not fall under the explicit provisions of Section 5 or Section 6.

== Part III – Amendments as to form and execution of death sentence in England and Wales ==
=== Section 10 – Form of sentence of death for murder ===
The wording of the death sentence was changed to "shall suffer death in the manner authorised by law" from "shall suffer death by hanging." [prior to 1948 the sentence read "shall be hanged by the neck until you are dead."]

All other murders were to be punished with mandatory life imprisonment.

== Capital murder convictions ==
There were 75 convictions for capital murder under the Act, 66 in England and Wales and nine in Scotland. Five were of people under the age of 18; six of the convictions were reduced either to non-capital murder or manslaughter on appeal, leaving 64 who were liable to be hanged. Of these, 32 (including the only woman) were recommended to mercy and were reprieved from the gallows. The other 32 men – 29 in England and Wales and three in Scotland – were hanged.

While the death penalty was originally still available under the subsequent Murder (Abolition of Death Penalty) Act 1965, which replaced the Homicide Act 1957, the last executions in the United Kingdom were carried out on 13 August 1964, when Peter Allen and Gwynne Evans were hanged for murdering John Alan West during a theft four months earlier, a death penalty crime under the 1957 Act.

=== England and Wales ===
Date	Defendant	Court	Section	Outcome	Reference
16 May 1957	Dunbar, Ronald Patrick	Newcastle upon Tyne Assizes	5 (1) (a)	reduced to manslaughter on appeal	
23 May 1957	Vickers, John Wilson	Cumberland Assizes	5 (1) (a)	hanged	
28 June 1957	McPherson, Franklin Rupert	Nottingham Assizes	5 (1) (b)	reduced to manslaughter on appeal	
18 October 1957	Howard, Dennis	Worcester Assizes	5 (1) (a) and (b)	hanged	
19 December 1957	Spriggs, John Francis	Birmingham Assizes	5 (1) (b)	reprieved	
30 January 1958	Matheson, Albert Edward	Durham Assizes	5 (1) (a)	reduced to manslaughter on appeal	
18 March 1958	Teed, Vivian Frederick	Cardiff Assizes	5 (1) (a)	hanged	
29 March 1958	Wilson, Mary Elizabeth	Leeds Assizes	6 (2)	reprieved	
30 April 1958	Bosworth, Arthur John	Central Criminal Court	5 (1) (a) and (c)	reprieved	
22 May 1958	Collier, George William	Central Criminal Court	5 (1) (a)	reprieved	
3 July 1958	Kavanagh, Matthew	Warwick Assizes	5 (1) (a)	hanged	
23 July 1958	Stokes, Frank	Leeds Assizes	5 (1) (a)	hanged	
20 October 1958	Chandler, Brian	Durham Assizes	5 (1) (a)	hanged	
10 December 1958	Jones, Ernest Raymond	Leeds Assizes	5 (1) (a)	hanged	
4 March 1959	Chrimes, Joseph	Central Criminal Court	5 (1) (a)	hanged	
19 March 1959	Marwood, Ronald Henry	Central Criminal Court	5 (1) (d)	hanged	
23 March 1959	Tatum, Michael George	Hampshire Assizes	5 (1) (a)	hanged	
13 April 1959	Di Duca, David Lancelot	Hampshire Assizes	5 (1) (a)	reprieved	
1 July 1959	Walden, Bernard Hugh	Sheffield Assizes	5 (1) (b)	hanged	
24 September 1959	Podola, Guenther Fritz Erwin	Central Criminal Court	5 (1) (b), (c) and (d)	hanged	
7 April 1960	Smith, Jim	Central Criminal Court	5 (1) (d)	reduced to manslaughter on appeal; conviction restored by the House of Lords; reprieved	
1 June 1960	Pocze, Mihaly	Lancaster Assizes	5 (1) (a)	reprieved	
22 July 1960	Constantine, John Louis	Birmingham Assizes	5 (1) (a)	hanged	
26 September 1960	Harris, Norman James	Central Criminal Court	5 (1) (a)	hanged	
26 September 1960	Forsyth, Francis Robert George	Central Criminal Court	5 (1) (a)	hanged	
26 September 1960	Lutt, Terence	Central Criminal Court	5 (1) (a)	detained at HM pleasure (aged 17)	
20 October 1960	Rogers, John	Somerset Assizes	5 (1) (a)	reprieved	
18 November 1960	Gnypiuk, Wasyl	Nottingham Assizes	5 (1) (a)	hanged	
12 December 1960	Riley, George	Stafford Assizes	5 (1) (a)	hanged	
20 January 1961	Day, Jack	Bedford Assizes	5 (1) (b)	hanged	
20 March 1961	Duffy, Christopher John	Central Criminal Court	5 (1) (a)	detained at HM pleasure (aged 16)	
28 March 1961	Terry, Victor John	Sussex Assizes	5 (1) (a) and (b)	hanged	
26 April 1961	Pankotai, Zsiga	Leeds Assizes	5 (1) (a)	hanged	
1 May 1961	Singleton, Sidney	Manchester Crown Court	5 (1) (a)	detained at HM pleasure (aged 17)	
12 May 1961	Bush, Edwin Albert Arthur	Central Criminal Court	5 (1) (a)	hanged	
4 July 1961	Porritt, George Anthony	Central Criminal Court	5 (1) (b)	reduced to manslaughter on appeal	
20 July 1961	Niemasz, Hendryk	Lewes Assizes	5 (1) (a)	hanged	
1 November 1961	McMenemy, John Christopher	Liverpool Assizes	5 (1) (a)	reprieved	
17 February 1962	Hanratty, James	Bedford Assizes	5 (1) (b)	hanged	
20 July 1962	McCrorey, Bernard Joseph	Manchester Crown Court	5 (1) (a)	reduced to manslaughter on appeal	
12 October 1962	Grey, Oswald Augustus	Birmingham Assizes	5 (1) (a) and (b)	hanged	
18 October 1962	Smith, James	Liverpool Crown Court	5 (1) (a)	hanged	
12 March 1963	Thatcher, George Frederick	Central Criminal Court	5 (1) (a) and (b)	reduced to non-capital murder on appeal	
7 October 1963	Black, Edgar Valentine	Glamorgan Assizes	5 (1) (b)	reprieved	
2 November 1963	Pascoe, Russell	Cornwall Assizes	5 (1) (a)	hanged	
2 November 1963	Whitty, Dennis John	Cornwall Assizes	5 (1) (a)	hanged	
6 February 1964	Simcox, Christopher	Stafford Assizes	5 (1) (b) and 6 (1)	reprieved	
1 May 1964	Masters, Joseph William	Lancaster Assizes	5 (1) (a)	reprieved	
26 June 1964	Dobbing, William Joseph	Leeds Assizes	5 (1) (b)	reprieved	
7 July 1964	Allen, Peter Anthony	Manchester Crown Court	5 (1) (a)	hanged	
7 July 1964	Evans, Gwynne Owen	Manchester Crown Court	5 (1) (a)	hanged	
14 December 1964	Cooper, Ronald John	Central Criminal Court	5 (1) (b)	reprieved	
17 December 1964	Dunford, Peter Anthony	Leeds Assizes	6 (1)	reprieved	
8 February 1965	Lawrence, Joseph	Stafford Assizes	5 (1) (a)	reprieved	
22 March 1965	Dunning, William Roger	Central Criminal Court	5 (1) (a)	reprieved	
22 March 1965	Simpson, John Cummins	Central Criminal Court	5 (1) (a)	reprieved	
22 March 1965	Odam, Michael William	Central Criminal Court	5 (1) (a)	reprieved	
26 March 1965	Pockett, Frank Gordon	Birmingham Assizes	5 (1) (a)	reprieved	
30 March 1965	Latham, Richard Terence	Leeds Assizes	5 (1) (b)	reprieved	
7 April 1965	Stoneley, John William	Winchester Assizes	5 (1) (a)	reprieved	
26 July 1965	Williams, Frederick	Worcester Assizes	5 (1) (b)	reprieved	
27 July 1965	Burgess, Henry Francis	Central Criminal Court	5 (1) (b)	reprieved	
27 October 1965	Wardley, David Henry	Stafford Assizes	5 (1) (d)	reprieved	
1 November 1965	Chapman, David Stephen	Leeds Assizes	5 (1) (a)	reprieved	

=== Scotland ===
Date	Accused	Court	Section	Outcome	Reference
29 May 1958	Manuel, Peter Thomas Anthony	High Court at Glasgow	5 (1) (b) and 6 (2)	hanged	
25 September 1958	Forbes, Donald Ferguson	High Court at Edinburgh	5 (1) (a)	reprieved	
7 July 1959	McGilvray, John	High Court at Glasgow	5 (1) (a)	detained at HM pleasure (aged 17)	
9 March 1960	Stirling, Alexander Main	High Court at Edinburgh	5 (1) (b) and 6 (2)	reprieved	
16 November 1960	Miller, Anthony Joseph	High Court at Glasgow	5 (1) (a)	hanged	
30 November 1960	Dickson, Robert McKenna Cribbes	High Court at Dumfries	5 (1) (b)	reprieved	
8 May 1962	Rodger, William	High Court at Glasgow	5 (1) (a)	detained at HM pleasure (aged 17)	
25 July 1963	Burnett, Henry John	High Court at Aberdeen	5 (1) (b)	hanged	
20 February 1964	McCarron, Patrick	High Court at Perth	5 (1) (b)	reprieved	

=== Abolition of the death penalty ===
The death penalty for murder was suspended for five years in 1965, and permanently abolished in 1969 (although it still remained for treason until 1998). The penalty today is life imprisonment under the Murder (Abolition of Death Penalty) Act 1965.

== Subsequent developments ==
Section 14 of the act was repealed by section 1(1) of, and part V of schedule 1 to, the Statute Law (Repeals) Act 1973, which came into force on 18 July 1973.

Section 17(2) of, and schedule 2 to, the act were repealed by section 1 of, and part XI of the schedule to, the Statute Law (Repeals) Act 1974, which came into force on 27 June 1974.

== See also ==
- Murder in English law
- Suicide
- R v Betts and Ridley
- Ughill Hall shootings, where the act was used unsuccessfully as a defense
