= Murder of John Alan West =

1964 robbery/murder, resulting in last use of death penalty in Britain

The murder of John Alan West on 7 April 1964 was the crime which led to the last death sentences being carried out in the United Kingdom. West, a 53-year-old van driver for a laundry company, was beaten and stabbed to death by Gwynne Evans and Peter Allen, who had gone to rob him at his home in Seaton, Cumberland. Both murderers were unemployed, had a history of petty crime and were arrested and charged within two days of the crime. At trial, each blamed the other, but the jury found both men guilty, and both were sentenced to death.

The use of capital punishment in the United Kingdom had been declining at the time, and public opinion was turning against the practice. As a result, the decision not to reprieve the two condemned came as a surprise. Both were executed at 8:00 am on 13 August 1964, in prisons in Manchester and Liverpool. Capital punishment for murder was abolished in the United Kingdom 15 months later.

== Gwynne Evans ==
Evans (left), Allen (right)

Gwynne Owen Evans (born John Robson Walby, 1 April 1940 – 13 August 1964) was born in Maryport, Cumberland, the third and eldest surviving child of Thomas and Hannah Walby. While attending a secondary modern school in Maryport, he occasionally attended Dovenby Hall Mental Colony in Cockermouth. On leaving school at 15 he worked as a page boy at a hotel in Carlisle and an engine cleaner for British Railways, in between periods of unemployment. He was given a supervision order in 1957 and sent to a hostel in Bristol; later that year he enlisted in the Border Regiment but was discharged in March 1958 as "unfit under existing standards". He enlisted again in the Royal Inniskilling Fusiliers in November 1958 and was discharged in February 1959 for the same reason.

He then took to using the name Owen Evans and worked briefly for British Railways before again trying the armed forces. The Royal Air Force accepted him in July 1959, but discharged him after four months as "physically unfit for Air Force service". It was during a series of short-term jobs around Workington from September 1960 that Evans briefly worked for the Lakeland Laundry and came to know Jack West. He soon left and moved to Birmingham in October 1961 and there worked as a kitchen porter, driver and lift attendant. On 5 April 1963 as Gwyn Evans he was convicted by Carlisle magistrates of larceny of 5s cash, and obtaining 16s cash and a railway ticket by false pretences. He was fined £5 with four days' detention in default; he chose to serve the four days. He had stolen two half crowns from a friend while he was distracted, and he obtained a 16s loan from a police station by claiming to have lost his wallet at his mother's funeral. In the following month Evans was given three months' imprisonment at Dudley for driving a motor vehicle without a licence, and using a driving licence with intent to deceive. Evans enlisted again, this time into the Lancastrian Brigade, in October 1963 but was discharged on 14 November 1963 when his criminal convictions and failure to disclose them came to light.

Evans then moved to Preston, where he lodged with Peter Allen and his wife. He worked for an agricultural trading society for about a month. On 21 January 1964 Evans committed his first crime with Allen, removing the lead flashing from an empty house. On 28 January the two broke open a cigarette machine and stole the contents; they stole a car and a van and used them in burglaries of several other premises. An incompetent attempt to cover up the van's registration number led to their arrest and to fines of £10. From 5 March, Evans was employed by a dairy. On 17 March, having worked only two days, he was dismissed for absenteeism. The robbery of West was intended to provide enough money to pay the fines.

When he appeared in court, Evans spoke with a Welsh accent. He claimed that he had adopted the name Evans on finding out that his parents were German and that he had been born at Innsbruck.

== Peter Allen ==
Peter Anthony Allen (4 April 1943 – 13 August 1964) was born in Wallasey, Cheshire, the second son of Richard Thomas Allen. After attending a secondary modern school in Wallasey, he too left at age 15. He obtained but lost two jobs within a month, dismissed for carelessness, but later found employment as a pipe-cleaner for three months. On 10 July 1958 he enlisted as a junior gunner in the Junior Leaders Regiment of the Royal Artillery, serving for 11 months before being discharged on 13 June 1959 as "no longer required"; he was given a good reference. For two years after leaving the army, Allen worked for two trucking companies; he was dismissed by the second in October 1961 when he was given a promotion and was said to have been unable to handle the responsibility. While he was working as a lorry driver, Allen received his first criminal conviction, for aiding and abetting the taking of a car in August 1960; he was given a conditional discharge.

On 11 November 1961, Allen married Mary, a cinema usherette; the couple had a Catholic wedding, and moved to Manchester. Later that month he found employment at a scrap-dealer, being dismissed in April 1962 for poor timekeeping. Six months' work in a dairy was followed by six months in a steel works, Allen having moved to Preston in April 1963. He found a job as a labourer with an agricultural trading society, but after two months he injured his back and was unable to work; he was not dismissed until January 1964. Later that month, he committed the various robbery offences with Evans. In February 1964 he was taken on by a Preston dairy but was dismissed for absenteeism after a month.

== Crime and arrest ==
John West, known to his friends as Jack, was a bachelor who lived alone at 28 Kings Avenue, Seaton, Cumberland. Aged 53, he had worked for 34 years as a van driver for the Lakeland Laundry in Workington. After a normal working day, West had returned to his home just before 6.00 pm on Monday 6 April 1964. At about 3:00 the following morning his next-door neighbour was awoken by a noise in West's house and, looking out of the window, observed a car disappearing down the street. The neighbour called the police, who found West dead from severe head injuries and a stab wound to the chest. In his house the police found a raincoat in the pockets of which was a medallion and Army Memo Form. The medallion was inscribed "G.O. Evans, July, 1961", and the memo form had the name "Miss Norma O'Brian" on it, together with a Liverpool address. Liverpool Police traced a Norma O'Brien at the address; she was a 17-year-old Liverpool factory worker who told the police that in the autumn of 1963, while staying with her sister and brother-in-law in Preston, she had met a man called "Ginger Owen Evans". She also confirmed that she had seen Evans wearing the medallion. She was driven up to Kendal, Westmorland, and identified the medallion.

Evans and Allen had stolen a car (a black 1959 Ford Prefect, registration NXC 771) to go to West's house, and later abandoned it in a builders' yard in Ormskirk, Lancashire. Evans had asked a neighbour whether he could leave it there, and the neighbour thought his behaviour suspicious; she reported it to the police on the evening of Tuesday 7 April. The police found that the car had been stolen and matched the descriptions given in Seaton; with descriptions of the car and pictures of Evans, they traced its route back to Lancashire. The police also traced Evans, through his parents, as well as criminal and army records, to Allen's address in Preston. At 1.00pm, on Wednesday, 8 April, less than 36 hours after West's murder, the police turned up (in search of Evans) at Allen's home in Clarendon Road, Preston. Allen agreed to go to the police station in Preston, and was then driven up to Kendal and then to Workington (where the murder squad were based). In questioning Allen claimed to have been home with his wife and "Sandy Evans" on the night of the murder.

He said his wife was visiting her mother in Manchester, and gave the address. A Bolton police officer went to the address to find only the mother there; he left telling her he would wait outside for Allen's wife to return, and a few hours later she did return and went out immediately to the police car to tell the officer where to find Evans. Evans was soon found on a street corner at Phillips Park Road in Miles Platting and a search revealed West's watch. Taken initially to the police station in Middleton, when told he was being arrested on suspicion of murder Evans admitted that he, together with Allen, Allen's wife and two children, had gone to borrow money from West. Evans accused Allen of being solely responsible for the murder. He and Mrs Allen were then driven up to Workington.

== Interrogation ==
Allen initially stood by his claim not to have done anything on the Monday night but changed his mind when he was told that his wife and Evans were in custody. He explained that Evans had suggested robbing West and had initially gone into West's house on his own. Evans had then let Allen in, hoping that West would not notice, but West had come downstairs and so Allen had fought him. He said that Evans had given him an iron bar which he used to hit West. Allen then made a statement along these lines.

Evans claimed West had told him that he should see him if ever he was in Workington and needed money, so he had gone to ask for a loan. However, he said that Allen had forced his way into West's house intent on robbery, and that Allen had been the only one to attack West. During questioning, Evans spontaneously mentioned that he knew nothing about a knife and did not have one. Until that point, the police had not revealed that West had been stabbed. Evans admitted to stealing West's watch.

Mrs Allen's statement supported her husband's account that Evans had come out to invite him in. She reported that she had asked the two men what had happened in the house, and that Evans had said both had attacked West. At 1.15 am on Thursday 9 April, less than 48 hours after the murder, both Evans and Allen were charged.

== Trial ==
Allen and Evans were committed for trial by Workington Magistrates after a two-day hearing. The trial was initially put down for Lancaster Assizes, but on application by the defence was transferred to Manchester Crown Court. The joint trial before Mr Justice Ashworth began on 23 June; Joseph Cantley QC led the prosecution, with Allen defended by F. J. Nance and R. G. Hamilton, and Evans defended by Griffith Guthrie Jones QC. The indictment was for capital murder under the Homicide Act 1957, because West had been killed in the course of a theft (there was an additional charge of robbery with aggravation of two bank pass books and a gold watch). Allen claimed to have struck West only a few blows, and that Evans used the knife. Evans' defence was that the robbery had been suggested by Allen (if West refused a loan), and he had gone along with it only provided there was no violence.

The most important witness at the trial was Mrs Allen, who was called in her husband's defence. She stuck to her statement that Evans had let Allen into West's house, and that both men had been responsible for attacking West. She also testified that Evans had thrown the knife used to murder West out of the window of the car at Windermere, Westmorland, and that Evans had made an incriminatory remark apparently referring to stabbing West. In cross-examination she accepted that Evans had been more than a lodger to her; Evans' counsel then produced affectionate letters which she had written to Evans in Durham Prison while he was awaiting trial. The affectionate tone had suddenly ended when she heard Evans' account of the murder at the Magistrates' Court, and she had then written of her "deep and bitter hatred" of him. The judge later directed the jury to treat her evidence with caution; however the prosecution obtained permission to introduce her first statement which showed that her story had remained consistent.

In summing up, the judge asked the jury to decide whether the murder had been committed by one of the two men alone; in the latter case the other would be found guilty only of non-capital murder at the most. After considering the case for three hours the jury found both men equally guilty, and both were sentenced to "suffer death in the manner authorised by law".

== Hangings ==
Both men appealed, with the appeal heard by the Lord Chief Justice Lord Parker of Waddington, Mr Justice Winn and Mr Justice Widgery on 20 July. Judgment was given the following day dismissing the appeal. The date for the execution of the death sentence was set at 13 August. Under the law, the Home Secretary had to decide whether to advise the Queen to exercise the prerogative of mercy and commute the death sentence to life imprisonment; of 48 death sentences passed since the 1957 Act, 19 people had been reprieved. Only two executions had taken place in England in 1963 (those of Russell Pascoe and Dennis Whitty), and none so far in 1964. According to author Elwyn Jones, the police in the North-West expected a reprieve.

A recent reprieve for a notably brutal murderer from Lancashire may have led opinion in Preston to believe that a reprieve was likely for Allen and Evans, and a petition calling for both men to be executed was started (there was also a smaller petition calling for a reprieve). On 10 August, the Home Office sent out letters announcing that the Secretary of State had "failed to discover any sufficient ground to justify him in advising Her Majesty to interfere with the due course of law" in both cases.

Gwynne Owen Evans was hanged by the executioner Harry Allen at Manchester's Strangeways Prison at 8:00 am on 13 August 1964, assisted by Royston Rickard. At the same time, Peter Allen was hanged at Liverpool's Walton Prison by Robert Leslie Stewart, assisted by Harry Robinson. Those were the last two judicial executions of death sentences in Britain.

== Aftermath ==
Mary Allen later married Billy Price, who had been one of her husband's close friends. He adopted Allen's sons Mark and Richard. Mary Allen died in 1980 aged 37.

According to medical reports released to the National Archives in mid-2017, Gwynne Evans had 'serious psychological problems', which, had his defence team entered a plea of diminished responsibility at his trial, could have led to his escaping being hanged.

== See also ==
- Capital punishment in the United Kingdom
- James Smith (murderer)
