= Zsiga Pankotai =

Hungarian-born British murderer (1930–1961)

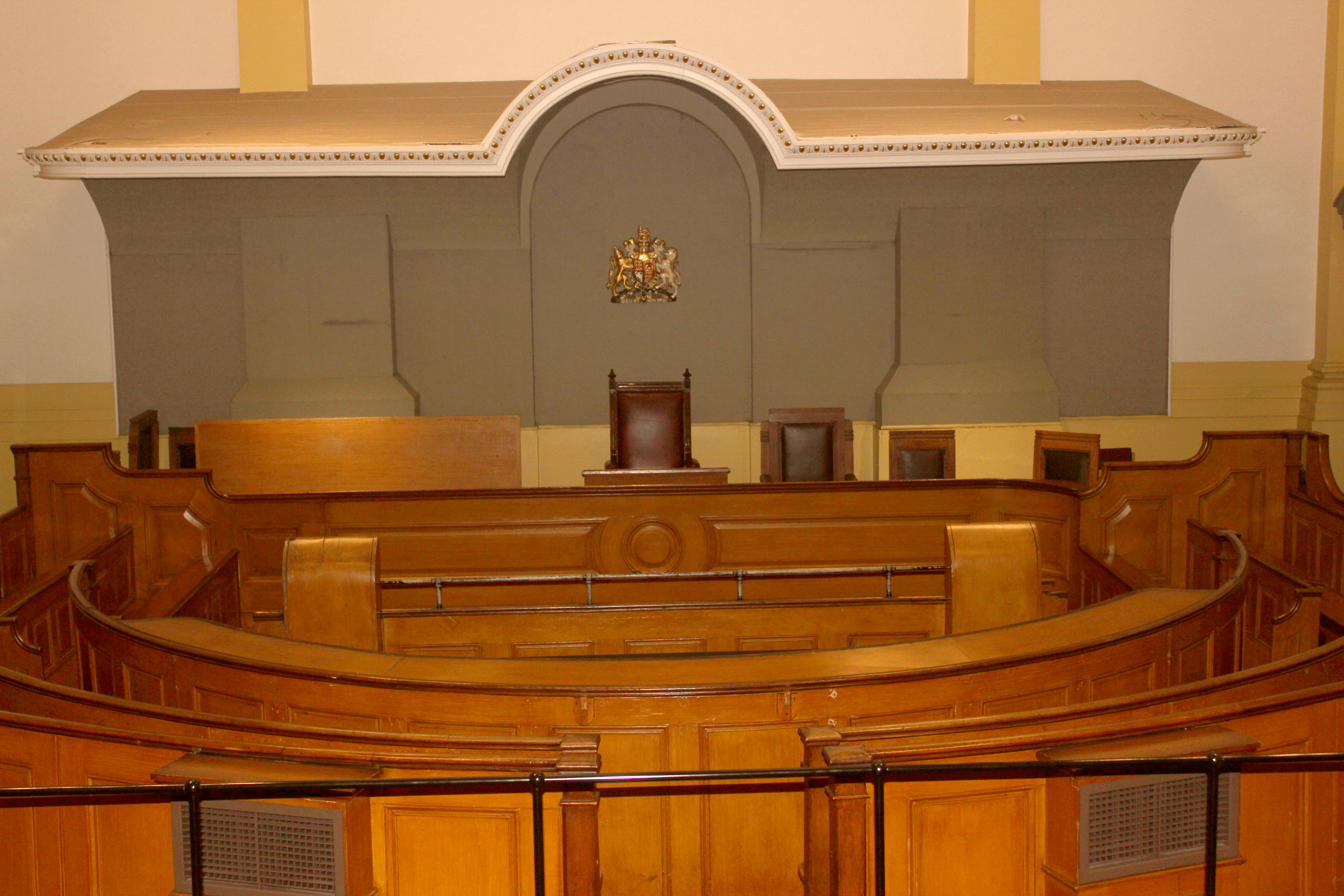
Pankotia was tried at Leeds Assizes when it was Leeds Town Hall (courtroom pictured)

Zsiga Pankotai (1930 – 29 June 1961) was a 31-year-old Hungarian-born British man who was hanged for murder on Thursday 29 June 1961 at Armley Gaol, Leeds, West Yorkshire (now HM Prison Leeds). He was hanged by Harry Allen for the murder of Jack Eli Myers in a house burglary in the city's affluent Roundhay district. Under the Homicide Act 1957, murder during the course or furtherance of theft was considered capital murder and the sentence in the event of conviction was one of death. He was the last man to be hanged at Armley Gaol.

Pankotia was tried, convicted and sentenced at Leeds Assizes (then seated at Leeds Town Hall). The hanging was the first in Leeds since 1959.
