= HM Prison Kingston =

Former prison in Portsmouth, England

Coordinates: 50.8035°N 1.0656°W

HMP Kingston
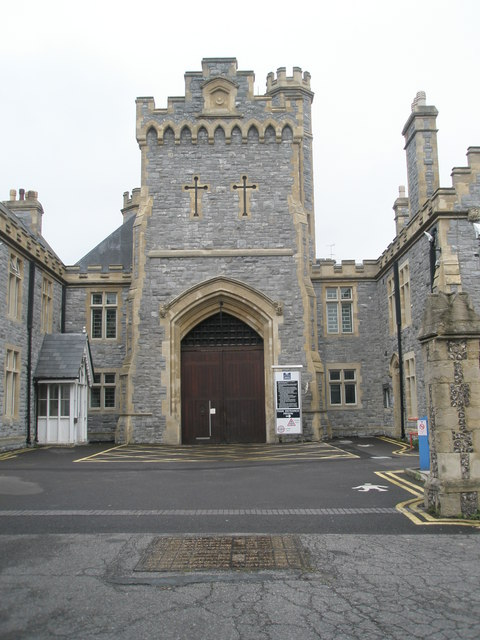
- Entrance to HM Prison Kingston
- Interactive map of HMP Kingston
- Location: Portsmouth, Hampshire
- Status: Closed
- Security class: Adult Male/Category B&C
- Opened: 1877
- Closed: 2013

HM Prison Kingston is a former Category B/C men's prison, located in the Kingston area of Portsmouth, in Hampshire, England. Prior to closure, the prison was operated by Her Majesty's Prison Service. In 2020, work began to convert the site to residential use.

== History ==
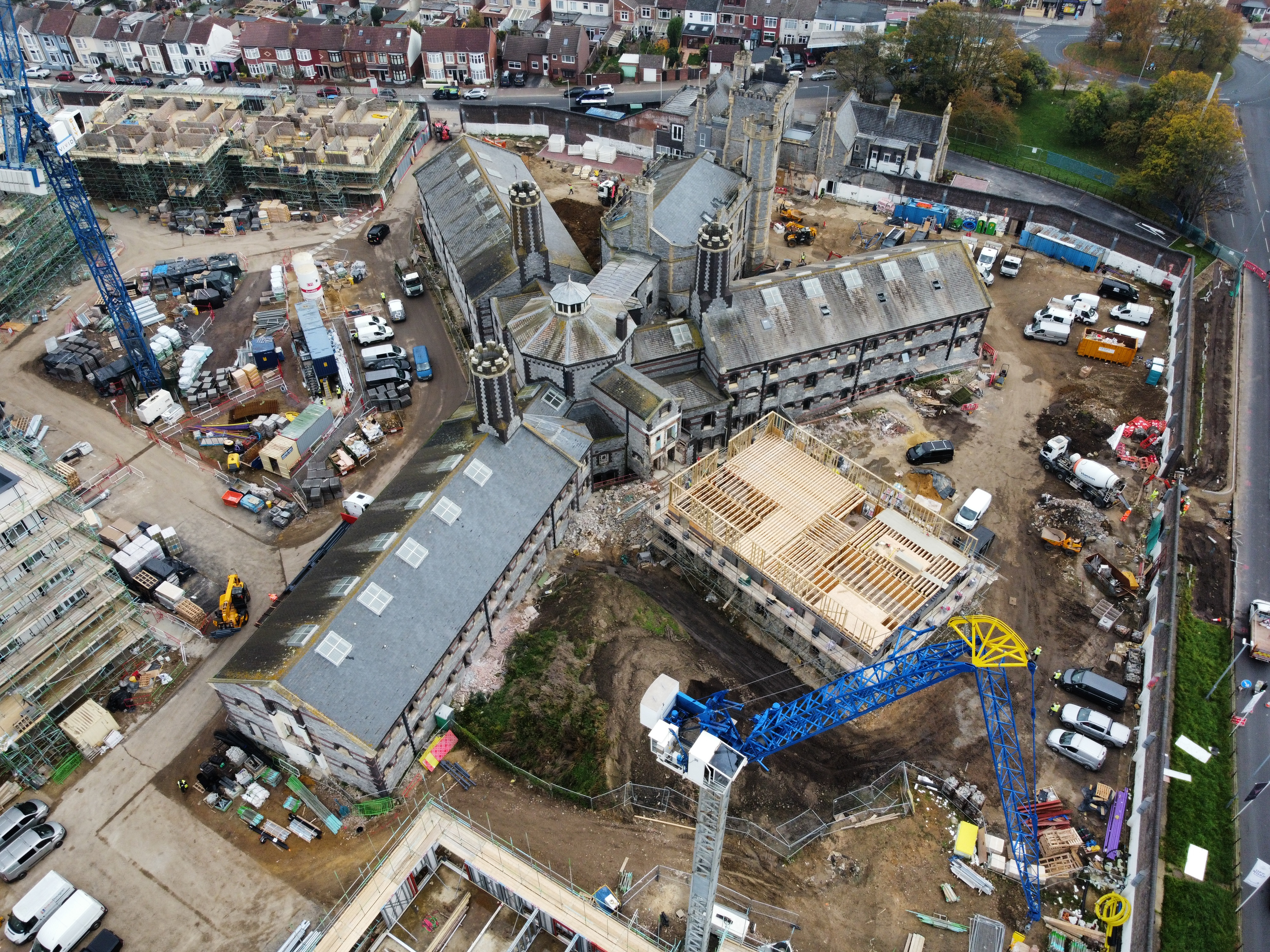
HMP Kingston being converted to residential flats in 2021.

Kingston Prison was originally built in 1877 as a Victorian radial design prison. Kingston has had a varied history. At one point the building was used for a boys' borstal, and then became a police station during World War II.

In 1965 capital punishment for murder was abolished in Britain and, as a result, Kingston began exclusively to hold inmates serving life sentences. Kingston became the only prison in England and Wales to have a unit exclusively for elderly male prisoners serving life sentences. In April 2003 a report from Her Majesty's Chief Inspector of Prisons stated that the elderly prisoner unit at Kingston provided unacceptable conditions for its inmates. The report detailed that movement in the unit was severely restricted, there was insufficient privacy and the rooms had too little natural light, poor ventilation and in some cases no power points.

Soon afterwards Kingston was redesignated as a more general category B and C prison, the elderly prisoner unit moving to HMP Norwich. From April 2012 Kingston became mainly a Category C prison, holding a high percentage of inmates serving life sentences.

On 10 January 2013 it was announced that Kingston Prison would close "in the next few months", as part of a wider prisons closure programme established by the Ministry of Justice. The prison formally closed on 28 March 2013. The former prison site was put up for sale, though there was a campaign to retain the site for use by the local community. On 24 December 2014 it was announced that Kingston Prison along with Dorchester Prison, Gloucester Prison and Shepton Mallet Prison had been sold to City and Country. For a time, the complex was used to host airsoft games. After a community consultation on the development of the site, the former prison is being converted into 267 homes.

== Notable former inmates ==
- Archibald Hall
- Anthony Sawoniuk
- The M25 Three
- Leslie Grantham
- Christopher Simcox
