= James Smith (murderer) =

British criminal (1936–1962)

Mugshot of Smith, taken in 1962 after his arrest for murder

James Smith (1936 – 28 November 1962) was a British man who was the sixth-to-last criminal to be executed in a British prison. He was hanged for the murder of Sarah Isabella Cross in her sweetshop at the corner of Hulme Hall Lane and Iron Street, Miles Platting, Manchester.

Smith, born in Edinburgh in 1936, had entered the shop on Friday 4 May 1962 and battered 58-year-old Cross to death in order to rob her of around £6 from the till. A total of 5 glass screw-top orangeade and cherryade bottles (made by Wild Bros of Heywood) were used to club the victim, each of which shattered to pieces as a result. Smith left coins scattered on the shop floor as he made his escape through the rear exit. The victim's body was subsequently found lying behind the counter.

Forensic experts discovered Smith's fingerprint on a door frame which had been painted two days earlier by Cross's husband, a factory worker, and was still slightly tacky. Smith's fingerprints were already on file because of a previous conviction. As a result, Smith was quickly arrested at his home on Corfe Street, Beswick, by Detective Chief Superintendent Eric Cunningham and Detective Inspector Tommy Butcher. The broken glass bottles from the murder scene were sent to the North West Forensic Science Laboratory at Preston, where they were carefully reassembled using a tube of glue. Smith's house was searched and microscopic particles of glass (recovered using a modified vacuum cleaner) were found on Smith's clothing and also down the sides of a settee. The tiny fragments of glass recovered from Smith's home fitted perfectly into the reassembled bottles from the murder scene.

The 26-year-old father of two, who worked as a £15-per-week rubber moulder at Failsworth, went on trial on 15 October 1962 before Mr Justice Stable and a jury. The hearing lasted three days and it took the jury just 20 minutes to find Smith guilty of murder. This verdict automatically resulted in him being sentenced to death because under the terms of the Homicide Act 1957, killing in the course or furtherance of theft or robbery was a capital offence.

Smith was subsequently hanged at Strangeways prison (Manchester), on the morning of Wednesday, 28 November 1962. His executioners were Harry Allen and assistant John Underhill. A few hours later, on the same day that he was executed, Smith's body was buried in an unmarked grave in Manchester prison cemetery. This practice was standard procedure because bodies of executed prisoners were regarded as property of the British government, and therefore remained in the custody of the prison where they had been executed. Because the prison cemetery was located inside the prison walls, there was no access for the general public. Smith's body remained in the prison cemetery until many years later, when (in 1991 and again in 1993) the remains of all the executed prisoners were exhumed and cremated and the ashes interred in plots C2710 and C2711 at Blackley Cemetery, Manchester.
