= Anuja =

Anuja may refer to:

- Anuja Akathoottu, Indian writer in the Malayalam language
- Anuja Chandramouli, Indian writer
- Anuja Chandra-Thakur, Indian snooker player
- Anuja Chauhan, Indian writer
- Anuja Dhir, British-Indian judge
- Anuja Iyer, Indian actress and model
- Anuja Jung, Indian sport shooter
- Anuja Patil, Indian cricketer
- Anuja Prabhudessai, Indian judge
- Anuja Sathe, Indian actress
- Anuja Trehan Kapur, Indian criminal psychologist
- Anuja Varghese, Indo-Canadian writer
- Anuja (film), a 2024 American Hindi-language short film
- Anuja village, a village in West Champaran district, Bihar, India

== See also ==
- Anuj (disambiguation), masculine version of the Indian female given name
