= Rastogi =

Rastogi is an Indian Hindu surname. Notable people with the name include:

- Ajay Rastogi (born 1958), Indian judge
- Anil Rastogi, Indian actor
- Anuj Rastogi (born 1978), Musical artist
- K. C. Rastogi, Indian politician
- Karan Rastogi (born 1986), Indian tennis player
- Natasha Rastogi (born 1962), Indian actress and director
- Navjivan Rastogi (born 1939), Indian Sanskrit scholar
- R. P. Rastogi (1926–2018), Indian scientist and academic administrator
- Rajeev Rastogi (born 1953), Indian computer scientist
- Roshni Rastogi, Indian television actress
- Sanjay Rastogi, Polymer physicist
- Shweta Rastogi (born 1973), Indian television actress
- Sunil Rastogi (born 1979)
- Veer Bala Rastogi, Indian author of biology textbooks
- Vineeta Rastogi (1968–1995), American activist (1968-1995)
- Yogendra Rastogi, Famous calendar art painters, in North India
