= Anuj (name) =

Name list

- Gender: Male
- Language: Hindi

Origin
- Meaning: Younger brother

Anuj (/əˈnʊdʒ/) (Devanagari: अनुज) is a male first name of Sanskrit origin. Anuj is a common Indian name meaning "younger brother".

Notable people with the name include:

- Anuj (singer), Indian-born Australian pop singer
- Anuj Batra, American electrical engineer
- Anuj Dass (born 1974), Indian cricketer
- Anuj Dhar, Indian author and journalist
- Anuj Gurwara (born 1981), Indian playback singer, Radio Jockey, actor and MC
- Anuj Lugun (born 1986), Indian award winner poet
- Anuj Nayyar (born 1975), Indian Army Officer
- Anuj Rastogi (born 1978), Canadian composer
- Anuj Sachdeva (born 1982), Indian actor
- Anuj Sawhney (born 1981), Indian actor
- Anuj Saxena (born 1957), Indian actor
- Anuj Sharma (singer), a singer who became famous through Indian Idol
- Anuj Sharma (actor) (born 1976), Indian politician and actor
- Anuj Sharma (police officer) (born 1968), officer of the Indian Police Service
