= Anuj =

Anuj may refer to:

- Anuj (name), Indian masculine given to the youngest brother in the family name (including a list of persons with the name)
  - Anuj (singer), an Indian-born Australian pop-singer
- Anuj, Hamadan, a village in Iran
- Anuj-e Olya, a village in Iran
- Anuj-e Sofla, a village in Iran

== See also ==
- Anuja (disambiguation), feminine version of the Indian female given name
- Murder of Anuj Bidve, 2011 murder in the UK
