= Louisa May Merrifield =

British poisoner (1906–1953)

Louisa May Merrifield in 1953

Louisa May Merrifield (née Highway; 3 December 1906 – 18 September 1953) was a British murderer and the third-last woman to be hanged in the United Kingdom. She was executed by Albert Pierrepoint at Strangeways Prison in Manchester for poisoning her elderly employer. She was notorious at the time as 'The Blackpool Poisoner'.

== Life and marriages ==
Born in Wigan in Lancashire as Louisa May Highway, she was the youngest of five surviving daughters and two sons of Job Highway (1867–1945), an underground labourer in a coal mine, and Emma née Duncan (1863–1944).

By the time of her execution, Merrifield had been married three times. She married her first husband, Joseph Ellison (1905–1949) in 1931 and with him had six children, four sons and two daughters. Two of her sons, Horace Ellison (1932–1933) and Ernest Ellison (1943–1944), died in infancy. She lost custody of all four of her surviving children when she was sent to prison for 84 days in 1946, having been found guilty of ration book fraud and refusing to pay the £10 fine.

Joseph Ellison died in 1949, aged 44, owing to sub-acute infective hepatitis. Merrifield subsequently married 78-year-old Richard Weston on 6 February 1950. He died 10 weeks later of a heart attack. Two of her husbands were older men, and she had been married three times in 10 months.

On 22 August 1950, she married her third husband, 67-year-old widower Alfred Edward Merrifield (24 August 1882 – 24 June 1962), whose first wife Alice Whittle had died in 1949. He had abandoned her and their 10 children in 1928.

== Sarah Ricketts ==
339 Devonshire Road in Blackpool – the scene of the murder – photographed in 1953

From 1950 up to the time of the murder, Merrifield had some 20 jobs working as a domestic helper and housekeeper. She had been frequently fired or forced to leave owing to her poor attitude to her work and her alleged pilfering.

On 12 March 1953, Louisa and Alfred Merrifield were employed as house-keeper, handyman and live-in companions to 79-year-old Sarah Ann Ricketts. Ricketts lived in her bungalow at 339 Devonshire Road in Blackpool. Ricketts was a widow, whose two husbands had both committed suicide by gassing themselves in the kitchen. Ricketts was 4 ft 8 in (1.42 m), and was described as a difficult woman with a short temper. Ricketts had a habit of changing her will whenever a beneficiary annoyed or upset her. Soon after the Merrifields took up their jobs, Ricketts was complaining about their lack of care towards her, the shortage of food and that they were spending a lot of her money in the local public houses where Louisa "drank excessively and habitually became severely inebriated". Louisa Merrifield spent much of her time in the pubs of Blackpool rather than taking care of her employer. She began to brag that Mrs Ricketts was dead and had left her the bungalow, even though the old woman was still alive.

It became apparent to Louisa Merrifield that her elderly husband would not be able to support her financially for much longer. By late March 1953, Merrifield had talked Mrs Ricketts into writing a will that left the bungalow to her. The bungalow was valued at £3,000 to £4,000. On the complaint of Alfred Merrifield that he was not included in the will, he was assigned half of the property. On 9 April, Louisa Merrifield convinced Dr Yule (Mrs Ricketts' physician) to certify that Ricketts was mentally competent enough to make a new will. Dr Yule later stated: "She [Merrifield] said the reason why she wanted me to go was that the old lady might die at any minute with a stroke or a disease and she wanted to keep herself all right with the relatives." On 13 April, Dr Yule’s partner Dr Albert Victor Wood was called out by Merrifield. She stated that Ricketts was seriously ill, whereas Wood merely diagnosed mild bronchitis. He later testified at Merrifield’s trial: "I remonstrated with Mrs Merrifield for calling me out, as I thought, under false pretences. She again said she was afraid of something happening during the night... Mrs Merrifield mentioned something about a will. I said I wasn't interested." Although this evidence is only circumstantial, it does lead to the conclusion that Merrifield was already trying to prove that the elderly Mrs Ricketts was dying of natural causes.

== Murder ==
Among her other rather odd eating habits, Ricketts enjoyed eating sweet jams straight from the jar, eating them by spoon. She accompanied the jams with either rum or a bottle of stout. Louisa Merrifield added Rodine to the jams, a phosphorus-based rodenticide. She had purchased it through a local chemist. On 12 April 1953, Merrifield told her friend Jessie Brewer that she had to return home to 'lay out' an old woman. On Brewer's inquiry as to who had died, Merrifield said "she’s not dead yet, but she soon will be." Ricketts died on the evening of 14 April, but Merrifield did not call for a doctor until the next morning. She claimed that as Ricketts was clearly dead, she had not wished to call the doctor out late at night. Merrifield asked the local Salvation Army band to stand outside the bungalow, playing ‘Abide with Me.’ Merrifield insisted for Ricketts to be quickly cremated. She did not want the old lady's family to know of her sudden death. Later, funeral director George Henry Jackson stated that Merrifield did not want Ricketts' "two daughters to know she was dead or have anything to do with the funeral."

On reading of the death in the local newspaper, Mrs Brewer reported her conversation with Merrifield to the police. The police immediately ordered a post-mortem, which discovered that Ricketts had died of phosphorus poisoning, attributed to the rodenticide Rodine. When the police searched the bungalow, they did not find any poison, but inquiries at a local chemist's revealed that Louisa Merrifield had recently purchased Rodine. She was legally required to sign the poison register.

== Trial ==
Alfred Merrifield is arrested

Following the police investigation, the Merrifields were arrested and were jointly charged with murder before being committed to the Manchester Assizes for trial. The couple were tried before Mr Justice Glynn-Jones between 20 and 31 July 1953 with Attorney General Sir Lionel Heald QC leading for the prosecution and Jack Messoud Eric Di Victor Nahum QC (1906–59) for the defence. Louisa Merrifield had her photograph on the front page of newspapers as she arrived at court every day in a taxi smiling and waving to the photographers and crowds outside the court. During the trial, the largely deaf Alfred Merrifield appeared to be confused by the proceedings while his wife, who was confident that she would be acquitted, seemed to be revelling in the attention. Three doctors testified against Louisa Merrifield, as did several of her friends, who recalled her boasts of an inheritance. To one of her many previous employers, Merrifield had written "I got a nice job nursing an old lady and she left me a lovely littl [sic] Bundlow [sic] and thank God for it, so you see love all come right in the end." However, the letter was dated two weeks before Ricketts had actually died. Merrifield's friend Jessie Brewer testified that three days before Ricketts died, Merrifield had told her: "We are landed. We went to live with an old lady and she died and she's left me a bungalow worth £4,000 ... It was all left to me, until that old bugger got talking to her and then it was left to us jointly ... I made everything all right. It cost me £2. 2. 0d to get a Doctor to prove she was in her right mind." Under cross-examination, Brewer was adamant that these conversations had placed the death of Ricketts in the past tense.

Elizabeth Barraclough, who "was a complete stranger" to Louisa, testified that, while waiting in a bus queue, Louisa had told her that "she was very worried because she was looking after an old lady who was very ill" and after returning the previous day had found "her husband in bed with the old lady, and was messing about with her and this had got her vexed". She is quoted as having said "if this goes on again, I'll poison the old bugger and him as well... She's leaving me the bungalow between me and my husband, but he's so greedy he wants it all on his own."

Professor J. N. Webster was called as an expert witness on behalf of the Merrifields and he stated that, in his opinion, Ricketts had not died from poisoning but from the necrosis of the liver. However, the damage was already done and, after deliberating for just six hours, the jury found Louisa Merrifield guilty of murder and the judge sentenced her to death by hanging. The judge described her crime "as wicked and cruel a murder as I ever heard tell of." On the other hand, the jury was unable to reach a verdict on Alfred Merrifield, whom the judge described as a "tragic simpleton" and he was acquitted and eventually released from prison.

The evidence against the Merrifields was largely circumstantial, but what little there was had been exacerbated by Louisa's actions and her boasts of an inheritance while Ricketts was still living. It had been Louisa who had called the doctor to verify that Ricketts was well enough to sign a new will and it was she who had called the doctors out claiming Ricketts was near to death when she was actually just unwell. When Louisa accused Ricketts of bedding Alfred, the judge called her "a vulgar and stupid woman with a very dirty mind." He claimed that if the accusation is true, it is more likely that Alfred Merrifield was sexually abusing Ricketts. These incidents were used to demonstrate her guilt but Alfred's innocence. However, Alfred Merrifield had the same motives and opportunities as his wife: it may have been Alfred who had bought the Rodine, it was Alfred who refused to contact the solicitor when Ricketts wanted to write the Merrifields out of her will saying it "was too far for him", and Alfred who refused the doctor admittance to attend on the ailing Ricketts by pushing the dining table against the sick-bed while he ate his lunch.

The anti-death penalty campaigner Violet Van der Elst petitioned the Home Secretary David Maxwell Fyfe by letter to commute Louisa's death sentence to life in prison. She wrote:

The husband ... posed as a kindly and simple old man, never spoke – and it seemed as if this old man had been made use of by his wife and had been made to do things under her stronger will. This was not true; he was a cunning old man acting a part in court, but if one could judge of the two people, I would consider that the old man was the most guilty ... He never troubles about his wife being condemned to death. He thinks, to look well he will take her a few flowers, but she can see through him and refused to see him.

Days before her execution, Louisa and Alfred were reconciled and she was visited in her cell by her husband to whom she said: "Goodbye, Alfie. Look after yourself and God bless."

== Execution ==
Louisa Merrifield was originally sentenced to be hanged on 18 August 1953, but she appealed against her verdict. The appeal was dismissed by the Court of Criminal Appeal on 3 September 1953, and the Home Secretary David Maxwell Fyfe subsequently refused a reprieve. Merrifield was hanged by Albert Pierrepoint, assisted by Robert Leslie Stewart, at Strangeways Prison in Manchester on the morning of 18 September 1953. On the gallows she refused to remove her glasses when requested. A crowd of several hundred gathered outside the prison to read the official notice of her death. Pierrepoint later stated that the hanging "went very well. She said goodbye to the death cell officers – much better than I imagined." Louisa May Merrifield was the fourth and final woman to be executed at Strangeways Prison, and the third-to-last woman to be hanged in the UK. As was the practice, her body was buried in an unmarked grave alongside other executed felons within the prison walls of Strangeways. Rebuilding work took place at Strangeways Prison in 1991, after the riot of the previous year; during this process, the remains of 63 executed prisoners (of which 45 were identifiable, including Merrifield) were exhumed from the prison cemetery and cremated at Blackley Crematorium in Manchester. The cremated remains were re-interred in two graves (plot C2710 and C2711) in the adjoining cemetery. In her will she left £45 13s 9d to her son Oswald Ellison, a brickworks labourer.

Following his wife's execution, Alfred Merrifield continued to live at the bungalow and fought a legal battle with Ricketts' daughters for a share of its value, gaining one sixth in 1956. He then lived in a caravan and became a regular attraction at Blackpool's Golden Mile beachfront side-shows billed as 'The Murderess's Husband' talking about his wife and the murder of Mrs Ricketts. He donated some of her clothes to Louis Tussauds Blackpool Chamber of Horrors and was paid £200 for his own waxwork to stand beside hers. Alfred Merrifield died on 24 June 1962 at the age of 79. He always maintained that he was unaware of his wife's activities and told crime writer Richard Whittington-Egan that "the old bugger" would have poisoned him next for his share of the bungalow.

Merrifield's case featured in the television true-crime documentary series Murder by the Sea. It is also referenced on her neighbour Ian McKellen's episode of Inside the Actors Studio.
