= James Berry (executioner) =

English executioner (1852–1913)

James Berry (8 February 1852 – 21 October 1913) was an English executioner from 1884 to 1891. He is best known for his main contribution to the practice of hanging, a refinement of the long drop method developed by British state hangman William Marwood. His improvements were intended to diminish mental and physical suffering, and some of them remained standard practice until the 1965 abolition of the death penalty in the United Kingdom.

An insight into Berry's behaviour and methods can be read in the book My Experiences as an Executioner, in which he describes his methods and recalls the final moments of some of the people he executed.

== Early life ==
Berry was born in Heckmondwike in the West Riding of Yorkshire, where his father worked as a wool-stapler. He served for eight years with the Bradford Police Force, then attempted to work as a boot salesman. Since he did not earn enough for the upkeep of his family in this role, he applied for the post of executioner after the previous one William Marwood died in 1883. However, he was unsuccessful despite being shortlisted for the role, until the short period of Bartholomew Binns in office was over.

Berry was the first British hangman literate and communicative enough to be able to write freely about his work. He considered the hangman the last link in what he called the "chain of legal retribution".

== Career ==
Berry's first executions were of Robert F. Vickers and William Innes, poachers who had murdered two gamekeepers named John Fortune and John McDiarmid while stealing game in Gorebridge, Scotland. They were executed on 31 March 1884 at Calton Prison in Edinburgh.

Berry was the executioner who failed to hang John Babbacombe Lee, known as "The Man They Couldn't Hang", in 1885. After three attempts, during which the trap door repeatedly failed to open, Lee's sentence was commuted to life imprisonment.

Berry executed an old Birmingham man named Moses Shrimpton, who had murdered a policeman who tried to stop him from stealing game, on 25 May 1885 in the courtyard of Worcester Prison. Shrimpton's neck muscles were weak, resulting in him being decapitated during the drop. Berry also executed Robert Goodale, a man who had murdered his wife. During his execution at Norwich Castle on 30 November 1885, Goodale was decapitated because the rope was too long. This became known as the "Goodale Mess." The rope that was used for the execution of Goodale was also used for the execution of John Williams, at Hereford Prison, on 23 November 1885, exactly one week earlier.

Berry executed serial poisoner Mary Ann Britland on 9 August 1886 at Strangeways Prison in Manchester. Britland was the first woman executed at Strangeways.

Berry executed William Chadwick on 15 April 1890 at Kirkdale Prison, in the first execution where a slope level with the prison floor was used to get to the gallows platform instead of stairs.

Berry's time in office came to an end following interference with his judgement by the prison medical officer at Kirkdale Prison regarding the appropriate length of drop; Berry compromised, but condemned man John Conway was nearly decapitated. In March 1892, Berry wrote a letter of resignation, probably without knowing that in October of the previous year the Home Office had already decided that "the employment of Berry as Executioner should no longer be recommended to the High Sheriffs."

Berry carried out 131 hangings in his seven years in office, including those of five women. In 1889, he hanged William Bury, a man suspected by some of being Jack the Ripper. In his book My Experiences as an Executioner Berry makes no mention of the Whitechapel murders, for which there have always been multiple suspects. However, his belief that Bury and Jack the Ripper were one and the same was published in his memoirs, which appeared in the 12 February 1927 edition of Thomson's Weekly News.

== Later life ==
Following his retirement, Berry toured as an evangelist and gave lectures on phrenology. In his book The Hangman's Thoughts Above the Gallows (1905), he complained that "the law of capital punishment falls with terrible weight upon the hangman and that to allow a man to follow such an occupation is doing him a deadly wrong".

Smith Wigglesworth, the evangelist and preacher, records Berry's conversion to Christianity, in a sermon which was later published in Faith that Prevails (1938):

In England they have what is known as the public hangman who has to perform all the executions. This man held that appointment and he told me later that he believed that when he performed the execution of men who had committed murder, that the demon power that was in them would come upon him and that in consequence he was possessed with a legion of demons. His life was so miserable that he purposed to make an end of life. He went down to a certain depot and purchased a ticket. The English trains are much different from the American. In every coach there are a number of small compartments and it is easy for anyone who wants to commit suicide to open the door of his compartment and throw himself out of the train. This man purposed to throw himself out of the train in a certain tunnel just as the train coming from an opposite direction would be about to dash past and he thought this would be a quick end to his life.

There was a young man at the depot that night who had been saved the night before. He was all on fire to get others saved and purposed in his heart that every day of his life he would get someone saved. He saw this dejected hangman and began to speak to him about his soul. He brought him down to our mission and there he came under a mighty conviction of sin. For two and a half hours he was literally sweating under conviction and you could see a vapour rising up from him. At the end of two and a half hours he was graciously saved.

Following his conversion to Christianity, Berry became a prominent campaigner for the abolition of the death penalty.

Berry died at Walnut Tree Farm, 36 Bolton Lane, Bradford, West Yorkshire, on 21 October 1913, aged 61.

== Berry's writings ==
- The Hangman's Thoughts Above the Gallows (1905)
- My Experiences as an Executioner, London: P. Lund, [1892] (via Internet Archive)

== See also ==
- Gallows hemp rope
- List of executioners
- Official Table of Drops

== Bibliography ==
- Wade, Stephen (2009), Britain's Most Notorious Hangmen, Wharncliffe Books, ISBN 978-1-84563-082-9
