= Rohatgi =

Rohatgi is a surname of Indian origin. People with this surname include:

- Jawaharlal Rohatgi, former Indian Member of Parliament
- Mukul Rohatgi, 14th Attorney General of India
- Payal Rohatgi (born 1984), Indian actress and reality TV performer
- Pradeep Rohatgi (born 1943), Indian-American materials scientist
- Sushila Rohatgi (1921–2011), Indian politician

== See also ==
- Rastogi
- 22958 Rohatgi, a main-belt asteroid named after Abhinav Rohatgi, awardee in the Intel Science Talent Search
- J L Rohatgi Memorial Eye Hospital in Kanpur, India
