= Mary Ann Britland =

English serial killer (1847–1886)

- Born: Mary Ann Hague; 1847; Bolton, Lancashire, England
- Died: 9 August 1886 (aged 38–39); Strangeways Prison, Manchester, Lancashire, England
- Cause of death: Execution by hanging
- Penalty: Death sentence

Details
- Victims: 3
- Span of crimes: March – May 1886
- Country: England
- State: Ashton-under-Lyne
- Weapon: Poisoning
- Date apprehended: July 1886

Mary Ann Britland (née Hague, 1847 – 9 August 1886) was an English serial killer. She was the first woman to be executed by hanging at Strangeways Prison in Manchester by James Berry.

== Early life ==
Mary Ann Britland was born in 1847 in Bolton, Lancashire, the second eldest daughter of Joseph and Hannah (née Lees) Hague. She married Thomas Britland at St Michael's Church, Ashton-under-Lyne in 1866. They lived in a rented house at 133 Turner Lane, Ashton-under-Lyne with their two daughters Elizabeth Hannah and Susannah. Britland held two jobs; she was a factory worker by day and barmaid by night.

== Criminal career ==
In February 1886, Britland went to a nearby chemist's and, claiming to have had some mice infest her home, bought some packets of "Harrison's Vermin Killer". As this contained both strychnine and arsenic, she was required to sign the poison register.

Britland's first victim was her eldest daughter, 19-year-old Elizabeth Hannah, in March 1886. Elizabeth's death was attributed to natural causes by the doctor who was called to attend the teenager. Mary Ann Britland then claimed £10 on Elizabeth's life insurance policy. Her next victim was her husband, Thomas, aged 44. His death on 3 May was diagnosed as epilepsy, and once again Mary Ann claimed on the insurance.

Mary Ann had been having an affair with her neighbour, Thomas Dixon, and after her own husband's death was invited to stay at the Dixons' house just across the street at number 128 by Thomas's 29-year-old wife, Mary. On 14 May, Mary Dixon was to become Britland's third and final victim.

== Trial and sentencing ==
The three deaths, all with their near identical and somewhat unusual symptoms, raised suspicion; Mary Ann Britland was finally interviewed by the police in connection with Mary Dixon's death and Dixon's body was examined by a pathologist. It was found to contain a lethal quantity of the two poisons, and Britland was immediately arrested along with Thomas Dixon. She confessed to Ashton Police that she had wanted to marry Dixon and that she had first poisoned her daughter, Elizabeth, because she believed that she suspected her intentions. She then killed her husband, and, finally, Mary Dixon.

Britland was charged with the murder of the three victims, but Thomas Dixon was found to have played no part in the murder of his wife. Britland came to trial on 22 July 1886 before Mr. Justice Cave at Manchester Assizes. Since there was an absence of motive, in her defence she argued that the small sum of money from the insurance payouts was in no way compensation for the loss of her husband and daughter. According to an eyewitness at the trial:

The case lasted two days...The evidence was overwhelming. The three deceased persons had been poisoned by strychnine. Mrs. Britland had purchased 'mouse powder' in sufficient quantities to kill them all, and there was no evidence of any mice on whom it could have been legitimately used. The case of the poisoning of Mrs. Dixon was the one actually tried, but the deaths of the others were proved to show 'system' and rebut the defence of accident. Even if there had not been sufficient evidence to secure a conviction, Mrs. Britland had many indiscreet conversations about 'mouse powder' and poisoning, and had been anxious to discover whether such poisoning could be traced after death...

It took the jury some time to convict her, although eventually, they found her guilty. After she was sentenced, she declared to the court: "I am quite innocent; I am not guilty at all."

== Execution ==
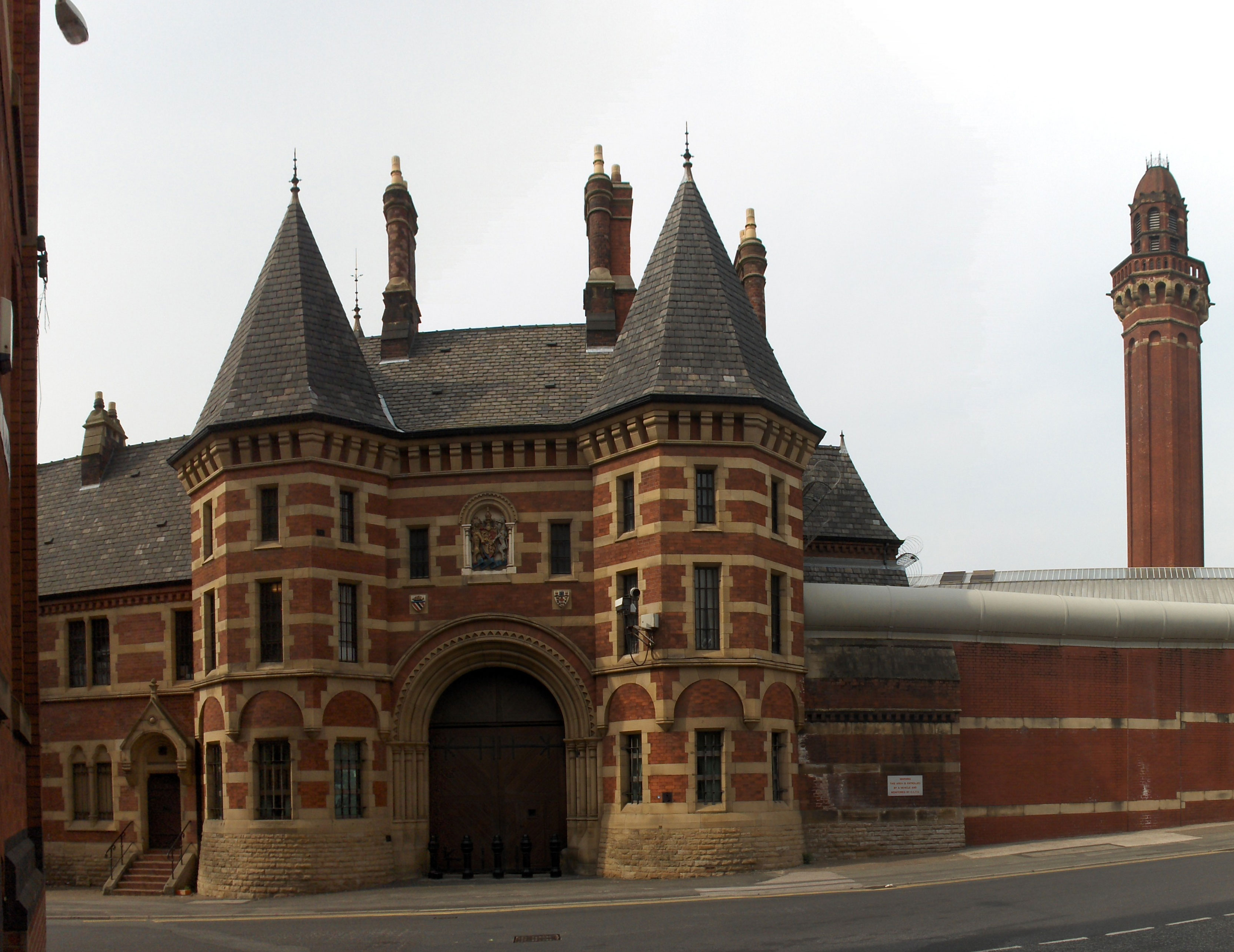
Strangeways Prison

On the morning of 9 August 1886, Britland was in a state of collapse and had to be heavily assisted to the gallows by two female wardens. Britland was screaming and asking for mercy. The women held her on the trapdoors while James Berry prepared her for execution. Two male wardens then took the place of the female wardens. On a signal from the executioner, they quickly stepped back, the trap door was released and Britland dropped.

She was the first woman to be executed at Strangeways Prison in Manchester.

== See also ==
- List of serial killers in the United Kingdom
