= Manchester Blitz =

Aerial bombing of British city during World War II

- Part of the Strategic bombing campaign of World War II
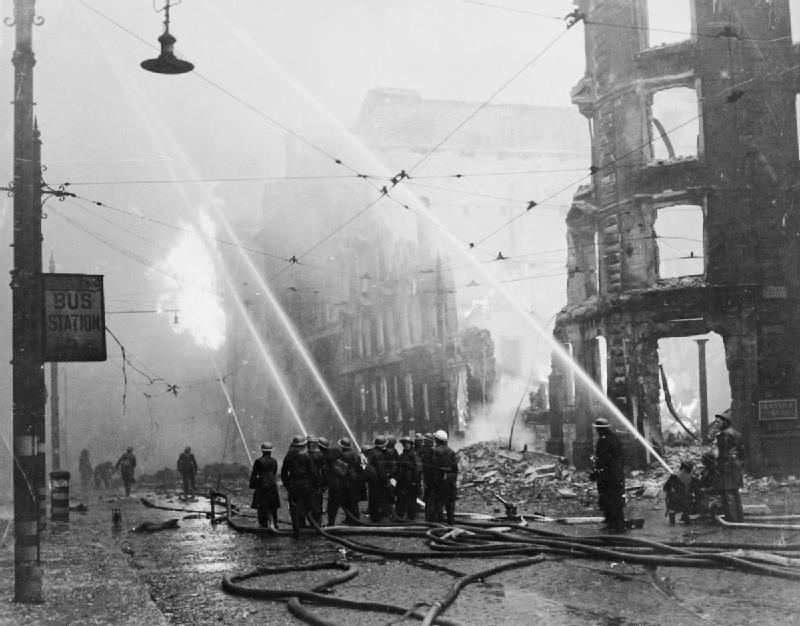
- Firefighters putting out a blaze at a bomb site in Manchester city centre
Date	1940–1942
Location	Manchester
Result	Manchester damaged by Nazi German air raids

Belligerents
Nazi Germany	United Kingdom

Casualties and losses
Unknown	1,000

The city of Manchester in North West England and its surrounding areas were heavily bombed during the Second World War by the German Luftwaffe in what became known as the Manchester Blitz. The Christmas Blitz was one of three major raids (Note: A major raid is one in which 100 or more tons of high explosives are dropped.) on Manchester, which was an important port (although not on the coast, Manchester served ocean shipping by a ship canal) and industrial city; Trafford Park in neighbouring Stretford was a major centre of war production.

== Raids on Manchester ==
Air raids began in August 1940, and in September 1940 the Palace Theatre on Oxford Street was hit. The heaviest raids occurred on the nights of 22/23 and 23/24 December 1940, killing an estimated 684 people and injuring more than 2,000. Manchester Cathedral, the Royal Exchange, the Free Trade Hall and the Manchester Assize Courts were among the large buildings damaged. On the night of 22/23 December, 272 tons of high explosives were dropped, and another 195 tons the following night. Almost 2,000 incendiaries were also dropped on the city over the two nights. The aircraft spread fanwise over the city and adopted the by-then familiar tactic of dropping flares followed by incendiaries and high explosives with later waves targeting the fires caused by the earlier attacks. There were other less intensive bombing raids across Britain and two German aircraft were reported to have been lost over the British Isles on 24 December; one crashed in the sea near Blackpool and the other, loaded with incendiaries and flares, crashed in flames near Sussex with no survivors.

== Salford and Stretford ==
Neighbouring Salford, Stretford and other districts were also badly damaged by the bombing. It is estimated that more than 215 people were killed and 910 injured in Salford, and more than 8,000 homes were damaged or destroyed. Seventy-three were killed in Stretford, and many more were injured.

In June 1941, German bombs damaged the original Salford Royal Hospital on Chapel Street at the junction with Adelphi Street, killing 14 nurses.

== Further raids ==
On 11 March 1941, Old Trafford football stadium, the home of Manchester United F.C., was hit by a bomb aimed at the industrial complex of Trafford Park, wrecking the pitch and demolishing the stands. The stadium was rebuilt after the war and reopened in 1949, until which time United played at Manchester City's Maine Road stadium.

In June 1941, German bombs damaged the police headquarters. Manchester continued to be bombed by the Luftwaffe throughout the war, and became the target of airborne V-1 flying bombs. On Christmas Eve 1944, Heinkel He 111 bombers flying over the Yorkshire coast launched 45 flying bombs at Manchester. No V-1s landed in Manchester itself, but 27 people in neighbouring Oldham were killed by a stray bomb. Another 17 people were killed elsewhere and 109 wounded overall. RAF De Havilland Mosquitos shot down one German bomber over the North Sea and severely damaged another, causing it to crash land in Germany.

== See also ==
- History of Manchester
- The Blitz
