= Cheruvattoor =

- Village
- Location in Kerala, India Cheruvattoor (India)
- Coordinates: 10.053935°N 76.580610°E
- Country: India
- State: Kerala
- District: Ernakulam
- Taluk: Kothamangalam
- Grama Panchayat: Nellikuzhi

Government
  - Type: Grama Panchayat

Languages
  - Official: Malayalam
- Time zone: UTC+5:30 (IST)
- PIN: 686691
- Vehicle registration: KL44
- STD Code: 0485
- Country Code: +91

Cheruvattoor is a village in the municipality of Kothamangalam, which is located at the foot of the western Ghats in the Ernakulam district of Kerala, India.

== Location ==
It is located in the eastern part of Ernakulam District, in the southern Indian state of Kerala. It is about 8 km (5.0 mi) from Kothamangalam, 8 km (5.0 mi) from Muvattupuzha, and 16 km (9.9 mi) from Perumbavoor.

Areas around Cheruvattoor include:

- Kothamangalam
- Muvattupuzha
- Perumbavoor
- Irumalapady
- Puthupady
- Nellikuzhi
- Paipra
- Methala
- Odakkali
- Thrikkariyoor

The main junctions of the village are GMHSS School Junction (also known as High Court Junction), MM Kavala Junction and Govt. UP School Junction. These intersections lead to adjacent small towns such as Paipra, Nellikkuzhi, Puthupady, Irumalapady, Methala, Odakalli and Thrikkariyoor.

== Administration ==
The Village Office is in Iramalloor. The Panchayath Office is in Nellikuzhi. The nearest police station is in Kothamangalam.

== Education ==
=== Schools ===
- GMHSS School Cheruvattoor
- NECT Public School
- Govt. UP School

=== Engineering colleges ===
- KMP College of Engineering, Cherukunnam
- MA College of Engineering, Kothamangalam
- Ilahia College of Engineering and Technology, Muvattupuzha

=== Kerala Agricultural University ===
The Aromatic and Medicinal Plants Research Station of Kerala Agricultural University is about 5 km (3.1 mi) away in the village of Odakkali.

== Places of worship ==
- Cheruvattoor Adivaadu Juma Masjid
- Bagavathi Kaavu
- Madasseri Sri Dharma Sastha Temple
- Cheruvattoor Pallypady Mosque
- Themamkuzhy Mahadeva Temple
- SNDP YOGAM Cheruvattor Shaga
- Kuzhuppilly Sree Dharma Shasta Temple
- Olil muhiyudheen Juma Masjid

== Historical places ==
- Kallil Temple Methala
- Thrikkariyoor Temple

== Politics ==
Cheruvattoor assembly constituency is part of Muvattupuzha Lok Sabha constituency and Kothamangalam Legislative Assembly. As of 2017, Antony John, Communist Party of India (Marxist) (CPIM), was the Member of Legislative Assembly for Kothamangalam.

== Transport ==
The nearest Kerala State Road Transport Corporation (KSRTC) bus stations are Muvattupuzha and Kothamangalam.

=== Road ===
Cheruvattoor is connected to Aluva–Munnar Highway (AM Road) via Irumalapady–Puthupady and Nellikuzhi–Paipra roads. It is connected to National Highway 85 (Old NH 49) via Irumalapady–Puthupady road and M.M Kavala–Sub-Station Road, and to Main Central Road (MC Road) via Nellikuzhi–Paipra Road.

=== Railway ===
The nearest railway station is Aluva railway station (code: AWY), about 31 km (19 mi) away.

=== Air ===
The nearest airport is Cochin International Airport (code: COK), called Nedumbassery Airport, about 30 km (19 mi) away.

== Health care ==
Primary health centre. The Govt. Ayurveda Hospital and Govt. Veterinary Hospitals
