= Pezhakkappilly =

Pezhakkappilly Paipra Kavala
- town
- Location in Kerala, India
- Coordinates: 10°1′30″N 76°36′40″E
- Country: India
- State: Kerala
- District: Ernakulam

Government
  - Type: Grama Panchayath
  - Panchayath President: Mathews Varkey

Population
  - Total: 2,950

Languages
  - Official: Malayalam, English
- Time zone: UTC+5:30 (IST)
- PIN: 686673
- Telephone code: 0485
- Vehicle registration: KL-17
- Coastline: 0 kilometres (0 mi)
- Nearest city: Cochin
- Sex ratio: 1027 ♂/♀ ♂/♀
- Literacy: 88%%
- Lok Sabha constituency: Idukki
- Climate: Tropical monsoon (Köppen)
- Avg. summer temperature: 35 °C (95 °F)
- Avg. winter temperature: 25 °C (77 °F)

Pezhakkappilly is a suburb of Muvattupuzha town in Ernakulam district, Kerala, India, to the northwest of the town of Muvattupuzha. Its main junctions are Paipra Kavala, Sabine Junction, Pallichirangara, and Pallipady.

Pezhakkappilly is situated along MC Road, and has seen rapid urbanization and growth in recent years. The main business centre of Pezhakkappilly is Paipra Kavala, which is located 4 km from Muvattupuzha, the second-biggest commercial centre of the Ernakulam district and one of the biggest in the central part of Kerala state.

== Location ==
Pezhakkappilly is located to the north of Muvattupuzha, which is 4 km from the city centre. Perumbavoor and Kolenchery, which are proposed to be a part of the Greater Cochin Development Authority, are within a distance of 15 km. The closest towns of Pezhakkappilly include Mannoor, which is 4 km north along MC Road, Cheruvattoor, which is 5 km east along the Payipra Cheruvattoor Road, and Mulavoor, 5 km to the east. Nellad is 5 km away, along the Paipra Veettoor Road.

== Demographics ==
Paipra Panchyath has a population of 32,779 and an area of 32.18 km^{2}. The population density is about 1000/km^{2}. The male population was 16,718 and the female was 16,061 at the time of the 2011 Census. The major religion in Pezhakkappilly is Islam. The place has one of the largest Muslim populations in the Ernakulam district. Hindus and Christians make up the majority of the rest of the population. There is also a large immigrant labour population.

== Politics ==
Pezhakkappilly is a part of Paipra Panchayath. The major political parties in Kerala – Indian National Congress, CPI(M), CPI, and the Muslim League – are present in the town. Panchayath is ruled by UDF on a power-sharing basis between Congress and the Muslim League. Mathews Varkey of Congress is the current President of the panchayath.

Pezhakkappilly is part of the Muvattupuzha legislative assembly constituency and part of the Idukki Lok Sabha constituency.

== Economy ==
Pezhakkappilly consists of mainly highlands and midlands with agriculture and small-scale industries as its primary economy. The main agricultural outputs are rubber, pineapple, tapioca and banana. There are a number of plywood and timber mills. Many migrant laborers work at plywood and other manufacturing facilities.

The economy has an infertility clinic, Sabine Hospital & Research Centre. Other local businesses include homestays, lodges, hotels, and bakeries.

Being on the route of State Highway 1, Pezhakkappilly is a key stop for passengers travelling across Kerala. It is on the route of the Sabarimala Pilgrimage, with pilgrims from several states passing through. It is also an alternative route from Kottayam to Thrissur, which bypasses Kochi.

== Education ==
There are around 7000 school and college students in Pezhakkappilly. The main educational institutions are:

- Government Higher Secondary School Pezhakkappilly
- Arafa Public School, Arafa College of Arts and Science
- Ilahia College of Arts and Science, Ilahia School of Science and Technology
- Jamia Badariya Arabic College
- TMA Public School
- Ilahia College of Engineering and Technology in Mulavoor

== Infrastructure ==
Major infrastructure in Pezhakkappilly includes:

- KSEB 110 KV Sub station and 1.25 MW solar power plant
- Sabine Hospital & Research Centre, Infertility Treatment Centre
- Charis Hospital
- Dr jas dental clinic pezhakkappilly
- Paipra Panchyath Office, Ayurveda Hospital, Village Office
- Shamma Auditorium, Meppattu Auditorium, KYS Mahal, Kunnapally Auditorium
- Kunnathan Chipboard Factory
- Metrola Steels

Religious sites include:

- Pezhakkappilly Central Juma Masjid
- Jamia Badriya Juma Masjid
- Paipra Kavala Juma Masjid
- Pallichirangara Juma Masjid
- Pallikkavu Thri Devi Temple
- St George Jacobite Church
