= HM Prison Manchester =

Prison in Manchester, England

Coordinates: 53°29′33″N 2°14′47″W

Manchester Prison
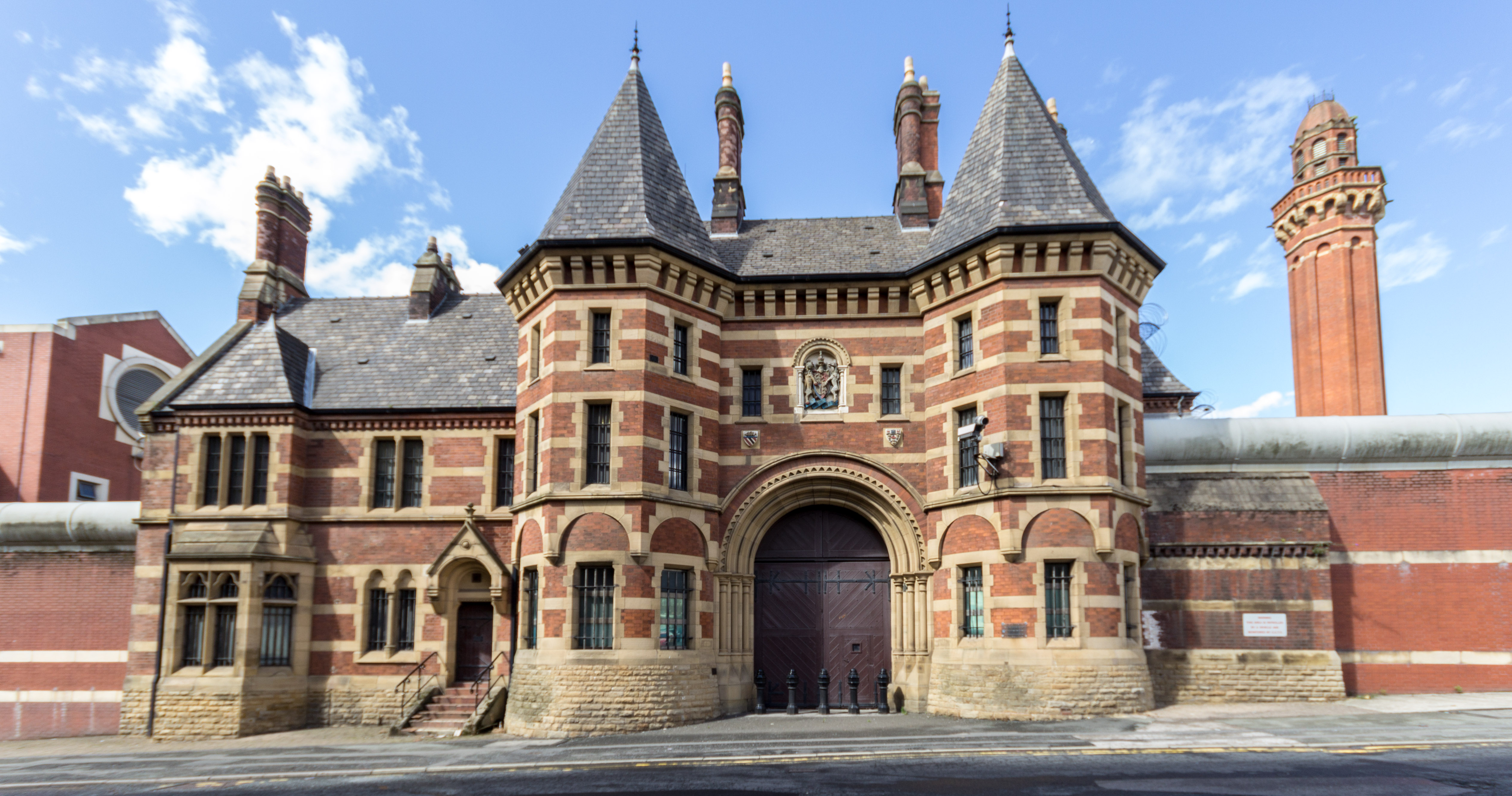
- Location: Strangeways, Manchester
- Security class: Adult Male/Category A+B
- Capacity: 744
- Population: ~624 (October 2021)
- Opened: 1868
- Former name: Strangeways
- Managed by: HM Prison Services
- Governor: Rob Knight
- Website: Manchester at justice.gov.uk

Listed Building – Grade II
- Official name: Former Boys Prison Block of HMP Manchester
- Designated: 2 October 1974
- Reference no.: 1254635

Listed Building – Grade II
- Official name: Main Prison Block of HMP Manchester
- Designated: 2 October 1974
- Reference no.: 1254636

Listed Building – Grade II
- Official name: Gatehouse of HMP Manchester
- Designated: 2 October 1974
- Reference no.: 1254670

Listed Building – Grade II
- Official name: The Tower of HMP Manchester
- Designated: 2 October 1974
- Reference no.: 1254672

HM Prison Manchester is a Category A and B men's prison in Manchester, England, operated by His Majesty's Prison Service. It is still commonly referred to as Strangeways, its former official name, derived from the area in which it is located. The present name was adopted when the prison was rebuilt following a major riot in 1990.

The prison is designated as a training prison, having previously been a local prison that accepted those remanded from courts in Greater Manchester. The prison retains a small category A function, located on Echo wing.

The prison featured an execution chamber prior to the abolition of capital punishment in the United Kingdom in the 1960s; the last execution at the prison took place in 1964.

Strangeways was designed by Alfred Waterhouse and opened in 1868 alongside the demolished Manchester Assize Courts. The prison is known for its prominent ventilation tower and imposing design, structured by the principles of the separate system.

== History ==
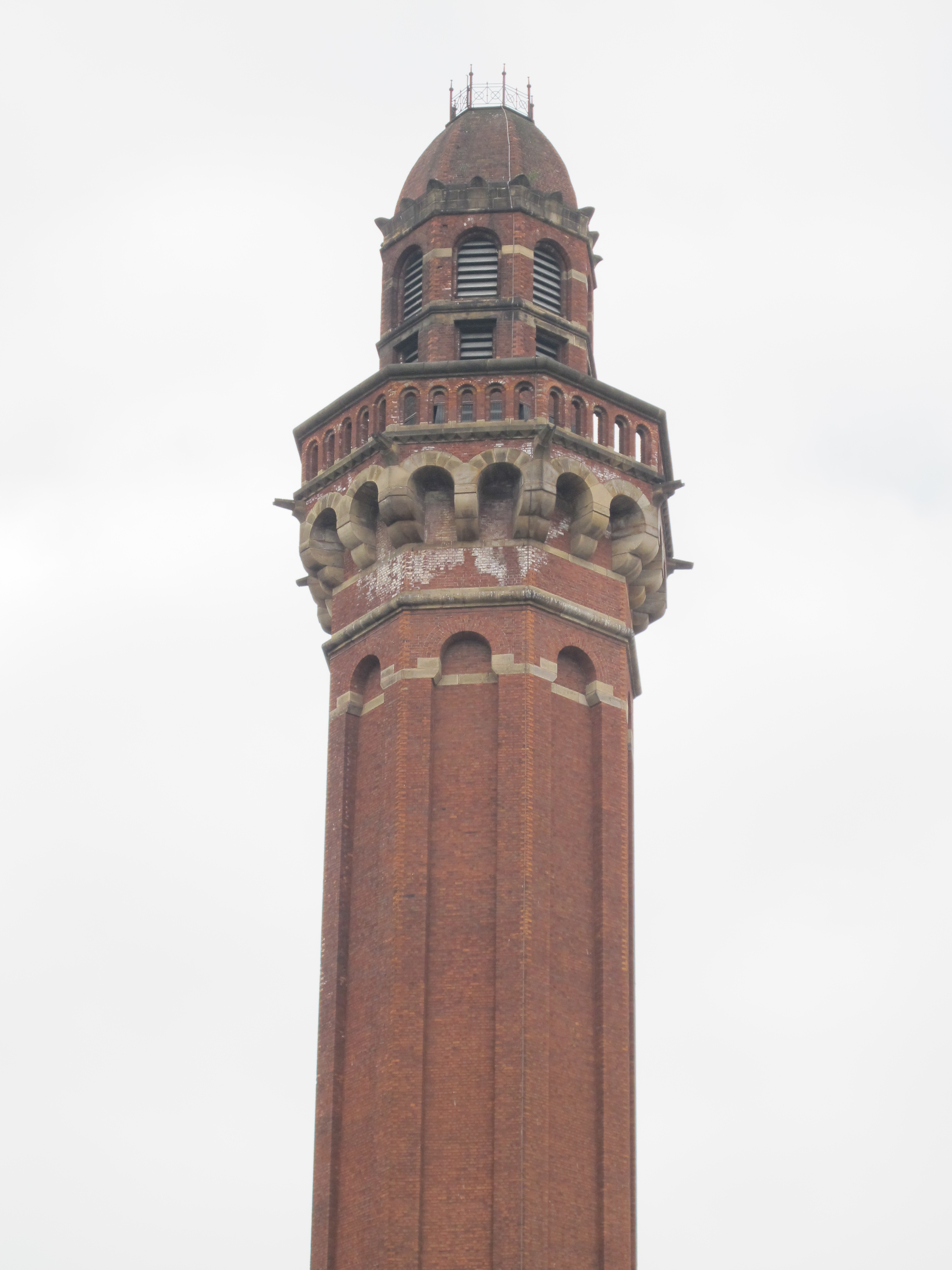
Strangeways ventilation tower

Construction of the Grade II listed prison was completed in 1869, to replace the New Bailey Prison in Salford, which closed in 1868. The prison, designed by Alfred Waterhouse in 1862 with input from Joshua Jebb, cost £170,000 (equivalent to £17,871,630 in 2025) and had a capacity of 1,000 inmates. Its 234-foot (71 m) tall ventilation tower (often mistaken for a watchtower) has become a local landmark. The prison's walls, which are rumoured to be 16 feet (4.9 m) thick, are said to be impenetrable from either inside or out.

The prison has an element of the separate system with its plan in the form of a star or a snowflake, with two blocks housing ten wings that emanate from a central core. The prison consists of two radial blocks branching from the central core with a total of ten wings (A to F in one block, and G, H, I, and K in the second).

The jail was built on the grounds of Strangeways Park and Gardens, from which it was named. Strangeways was recorded in 1322 as Strangwas from the Anglo-Saxon Strang and gewæsc meaning "[a place by] a stream with a strong current".

The prison was open to male and female prisoners until 1963 when the facility became male-only, and in 1980, it began to accept remand prisoners. As of 2005, the prison held more than 1,200 inmates.

=== As a place of execution ===
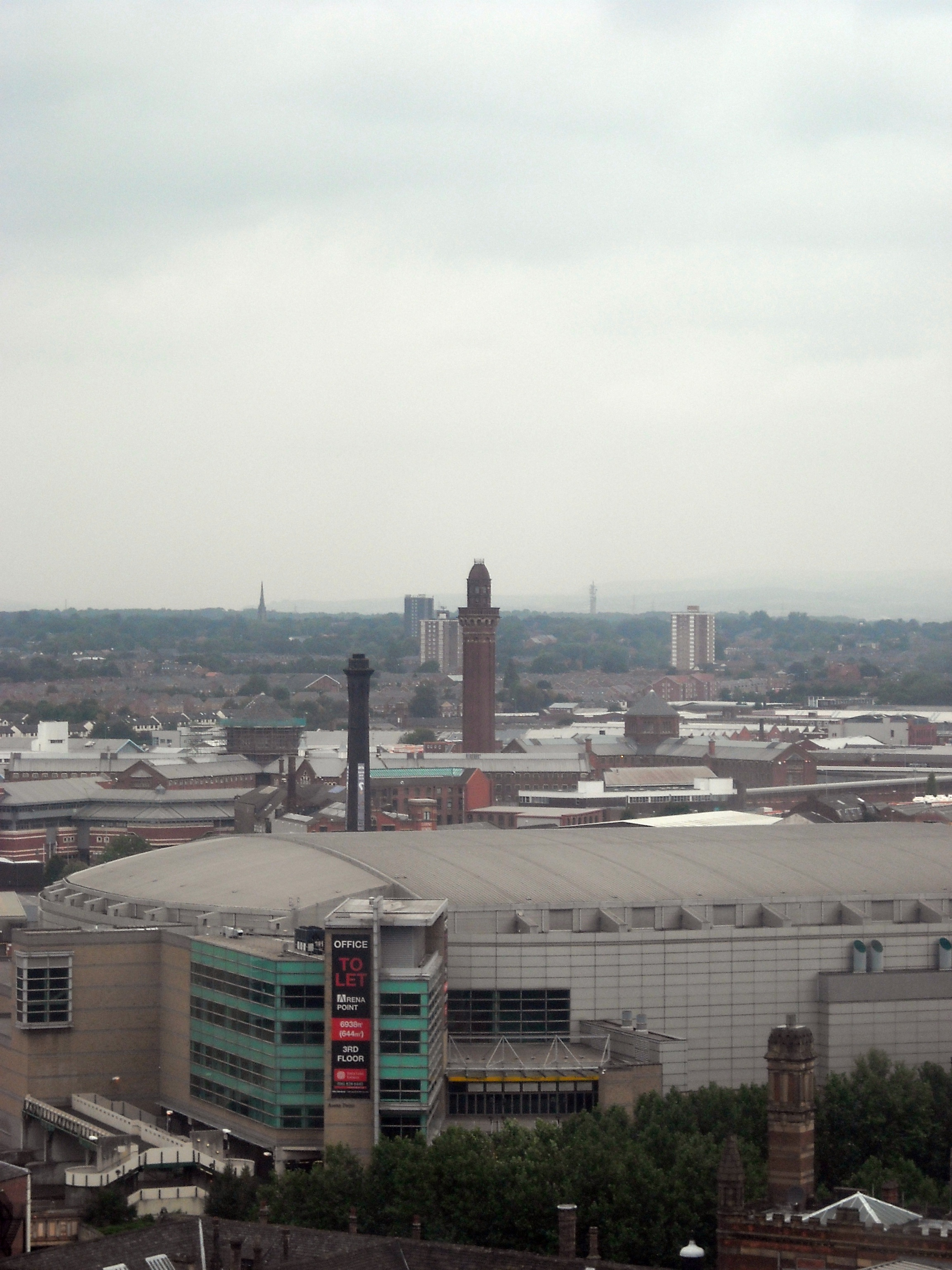
Overlooking Manchester Arena and the old Boddingtons tower to Strangeways

Originally, the prison contained an execution shed in B wing and after World War I a special execution room and cell for the condemned criminal was built. Strangeways was one of the few prisons to have permanent gallows. The first execution at Strangeways was that of twenty-year-old murderer Michael Johnson, who was hanged by William Calcraft on 29 March 1869.

Twenty-nine hangings took place over the next twenty years and 71 took place in the 20th century, bringing the total number to 100. During the second half of the century, the number of executions decreased, with no hangings between 1954 and 28 November 1962, when James Smith was executed. John Robson Walby (alias Gwynne Owen Evans), one of the last two people to be hanged in England, was executed here on 13 August 1964. Out of the 100 hangings, four were double hangings, while the rest were done individually. The "quickest hanging" of James Inglis, in seven seconds, carried out by Albert Pierrepoint, took place here.

==== Other executions ====
- John Jackson was executed on 7 August 1879.
- Mary Ann Britland (38) was executed on 9 August 1886 for the murder of two family members and her neighbour. She was the first woman to be executed at the prison.
- Lieutenant Frederick Rothwell Holt was hanged on 13 April 1920 for the murder of twenty-six-year-old Kathleen Breaks.
- Louie Calvert was hanged on 24 June 1926.
- Doctor Buck Ruxton was executed on 12 May 1936 for the murder of his wife. A petition for clemency was signed by 10,000 people, both sympathetic locals with high regard for this "people's doctor" and abolitionists who mounted a large demonstration on the day of his execution.
- Margaret Allen was hanged on 12 January 1949 by Albert Pierrepoint for the murder of an elderly widower. Her execution was the first of a woman in Britain for 12 years and the third execution of a woman at Strangeways.
- After the seven second hanging, Albert Pierrepoint executed Louisa May Merrifield on 18 September 1953. She was the fourth and last woman to be executed at the prison.

The bodies of executed criminals were buried in unmarked graves within the prison walls, as was the custom. During prison rebuilding work in 1991, the remains of 63 executed prisoners (of which 45 were identifiable) were exhumed from unmarked graves in the prison cemetery and cremated at Blackley Crematorium in Manchester. The cremated remains were re-interred in two graves (plot C2710 and C2711) at the adjacent cemetery.

The following people were hanged at Manchester Prison between 1869 and 1964:

People hanged at Manchester 1869–1964
| Date hanged | Name | Reason given |
|---|---|---|
| 29 March 1869 | Michael Johnson | murder of Patrick Nurney |
| 26 December 1870 | Patrick Durr | murder of his wife, Catherine |
| 30 December 1872 | Michael Kennedy | murder of his wife, Ann |
| 21 December 1876 | William Flanagan alias Robinson | murder of Margaret Dockerty |
| 27 March 1877 | John M'Kenna | murder of his wife, Annie |
| 4 February 1878 | George Pigott | murder of Florence Galloway |
| 19 November 1878 | James McGowan | murder of his wife |
| 20 May 1879 | William Cooper | murder of Ellen Mather |
| 17 February 1880 | William Cassidy | murder of his wife, Rosemary Ann |
| 28 November 1881 | John Aspinall Simpson | murder of Ann Ratcliffe |
| 13 February 1882 | Robert Templeton | murder of Betty Scott |
| 12 February 1883 | Abraham Thomas | murder of Christiana Leigh |
| 26 November 1883 | Thomas Riley | murder of Elizabeth Alston |
| 24 November 1884 | Kay Howarth (Note: Kay Howarth (a male)) | murder of Richard Dugdale |
| 24 November 1884 | Harry Hammond Swindells | murder of James Wild |
| 9 August 1886 | Mary Ann Britland | murders of daughter Elizabeth, husband Thomas and Mary Dixon |
| 15 February 1887 | Thomas Leatherbarrow | murder of Katherine Quinn |
| 30 May 1887 | Walter Wood | murder of his wife, Emma |
| 15 May 1888 | John Alfred Gell | murder of Mary Miller |
| 7 August 1888 | John Jackson (Charles Firth) | murder of Ralph D Webb |
| 24 December 1889 | William Dukes | murder of George Gordon |
| 19 May 1891 | Alfred William Turner | murder of Mary Ellen Moran |
| 20 December 1892 | Joseph Mellor | murder of his wife, Mary Jane |
| 28 November 1893 | Emanuel Hamar | murder of Catherine Tyrer |
| 31 July 1894 | William Crossley | murder of Mary Ann Allen |
| 27 November 1894 | James Wilshaw Whitehead | murder of his wife |
| 4 August 1896 | Joseph Hurst | murder of his daughter, Maud Goddard |
| 22 February 1898 | George William Howe | murder of Joseph Keirby Pickup |
| 6 December 1899 | Michael Dowdle | murder of his wife, Ellen |
| 4 December 1900 | Joseph Holden | murder of his grandson, John Dawes |
| 3 December 1901 | Patrick M'Kenna | murder of his wife, Anna |
| 2 December 1902 | Henry Mack | murder of Esther Elizabeth Bedford or Thompson |
| 12 May 1903 | William George Hudson | murder of Harry Short |
| 2 December 1903 | Charles Whittaker | murder of Eliza Range |
| 27 February 1906 | John Griffiths | murder of Catherine Garrity |
| 12 May 1908 | John Ramsbottom | murder of James McCraw |
| 28 July 1908 | Fred Ballington | murder of his wife, Ellen |
| 3 August 1909 | Mark Shawcross | murder of Emily Ramsbottom |
| 22 February 1910 | Joseph Wren | murder of John Collins |
| 12 December 1911 | Walter Martyn | murder of Edith Griffiths |
| 12 December 1911 | John Edward Tarkenter | murder of his wife, Rosetta |
| 23 July 1912 | Arthur Birkett | murder of Alice Beetham |
| 13 August 1913 | James Ryder | murder of his wife, Ann |
| 17 December 1913 | Ernest Edwin Kelly | murder of Daniel Wright Bardsley |
| 8 March 1916 | Fred Holmes | murder of Sarah Woodall |
| 29 March 1916 | Reginald Haslam | murder of Isabella Holmes Conway |
| 19 December 1916 | James Howarth Hargreaves | murder of Caroline McGhee |
| 21 March 1917 | Thomas Clinton | murder of Henry Lynch. |
| 17 December 1918 | William Rooney | murder of his sister in law, Mary Rooney |
| 6 January 1920 | Hyman Perdovitch | murder of Solomon Franks |
| 6 January 1920 | David Caplan | murder of his wife, Freda |
| 13 April 1920 | Frederick Rothwell Holt | murder of Katherine Elsie Breaks |
| 22 June 1920 | William Thomas Aldred | murder of Ida Prescott |
| 31 December 1920 | Charles Colclough | murder of George Henry Shenton |
| 5 April 1921 | Frederick Quarmby | murder of Christina A Smith |
| 24 May 1921 | Thomas Wilson | murder of Olive Duff |
| 30 May 1922 | Hiram Thompson | murder of his wife, Ellen |
| 3 January 1923 | George Frederick Edisbury | murder of Winifred Drinkwater |
| 28 March 1923 | George Perry | murder of Emma Perry |
| 8 April 1924 | Francis Wilson Booker | murder of Percy Sharpe |
| 13 August 1924 | John Charles Horner | murder of Norman Widderson Pinchin |
| 26 May 1925 | Patrick Power | murder of Sarah Ann Sykes |
| 11 August 1925 | James Makin | murder of Sarah Elizabeth Clutton |
| 15 December 1925 | Sam Johnson | murder of Beatrice Philomina Martin |
| 16 March 1926 | William Thorpe | murder of Frances Clarke |
| 24 June 1926 | Louie Calvert | murder of Lilly Waterhouse |
| 3 January 1928 | Fred Fielding | murder of Eleanor Pilkington |
| 28 June 1928 | Walter Brooks | murder of Beatrice Brooks and Alfred Moore |
| 6 December 1928 | Chung Yi Miao | murder of Wai Sheung Yi Miao |
| 4 April 1929 | George Cartledge | murder of his wife, Ellen |
| 16 April 1931 | Francis Land | murder of Sarah Ellen Johnson |
| 15 December 1931 | Solomon Stein | murder of Annie Riley |
| 3 February 1932 | George Alfred Rice | murder of Constance Inman |
| 18 May 1932 | Charles James Cowle | murder of Naomi Annie Farnworth |
| 19 December 1933 | William Burtoft | murder of Frances Levin |
| 30 May 1935 | John Harris Bridge | murder of Amelia Nuttall |
| 12 May 1936 | Buck Ruxton | murder of his wife, Isabelle and Mary Jane Rogerson |
| 4 February 1937 | Max Mayer Haslam | murder of Ruth Clarke |
| 12 August 1937 | Horace William Brunt | murder of Kate Elizabeth Collier |
| 20 April 1938 | Charles James Caldwell | murder of his wife, Elisa Augustine |
| 11 February 1941 | Clifford Holmes | murder of his wife, Irene |
| 4 September 1941 | John Smith | murder of Margaret Helen Knight |
| 26 July 1944 | James Galbraith | murder of James William Percey |
| 9 April 1946 | Harold Berry | murder of Bernard Phillips |
| 24 April 1946 | Martin Patrick Coffey | murder of Harold Dutton |
| 27 February 1947 | Walter Graham Rowland | murder of Olive Balchin |
| 12 January 1949 | Margaret Allen | murder of Nancy Ellen Chadwick |
| 28 November 1950 | James Henry Corbitt | murder of Eliza Wood |
| 19 December 1950 | Nicholas Persoulious Crosby | murder of Ruth Massey |
| 26 January 1951 | Nenad Kovacevic | murder of Radomir Djorovic |
| 8 May 1951 | James Inglis | murder of Alice Morgan |
| 12 June 1951 | John Dand | murder of Walter Wyld |
| 3 July 1951 | Jack Wright | murder of Mona Mather |
| 15 January 1952 | Alfred Bradley | murder of George Camp |
| 26 February 1952 | Herbert Roy Harris | murder of his wife, Eileen |
| 18 September 1953 | Louisa May Merrifield | murder of Sarah Ann Rickets |
| 17 December 1953 | Stanislaw Juras | murder of Erena Wagner |
| 8 January 1954 | Czeslaw Kowalewski | murder of Doris Douglas |
| 28 November 1962 | James Smith | murder of Sarah Isabella Cross |
| 13 August 1964 | Gwynne Owen Evans | murder of John Allen West |

=== Strangeways riots ===
Between 1 April and 25 April 1990, 147 staff and 47 prisoners were injured in a series of riots by prison inmates. There was one fatality among the prisoners, and one prison officer died from heart failure. Much of the old prison was damaged or destroyed in the rioting. Several inmates were charged with various offences, and Paul Taylor and Alan Lord faced a five-month trial as ringleaders.

The riots resulted in the Woolf Inquiry, and the prison was rebuilt and renamed Her Majesty's Prison, Manchester. Repair and modernisation cost more than £80 million after the riot, and rebuilding was completed in 1994.

=== The prison post-1994 ===
The prison is a high-security category A prison for adult males and has a maximum capacity of 1,269 as of 4 August 2008. Operation of the prison was put out to tender in 1994 and 2001. Accommodation is divided into nine wings in two radial blocks. Cells are a mixture of single and double occupancy, all having in-cell power points and integral sanitation.

The prison has become known for a high suicide rate following its reopening in 1994. From 1993 to 2003, Strangeways prison had the second highest number of suicides among inmates of any prison in the United Kingdom and, in 2004 Strangeways had the highest number of suicides in the country.

Education and vocational training is provided by The Manchester College. Courses offered include information technology, ESOL, numeracy, industrial cleaning, bricklaying, painting and decorating, plastering, textiles and laundry. The prison's gym runs courses in physical education and offers recreational sport and fitness programmes.

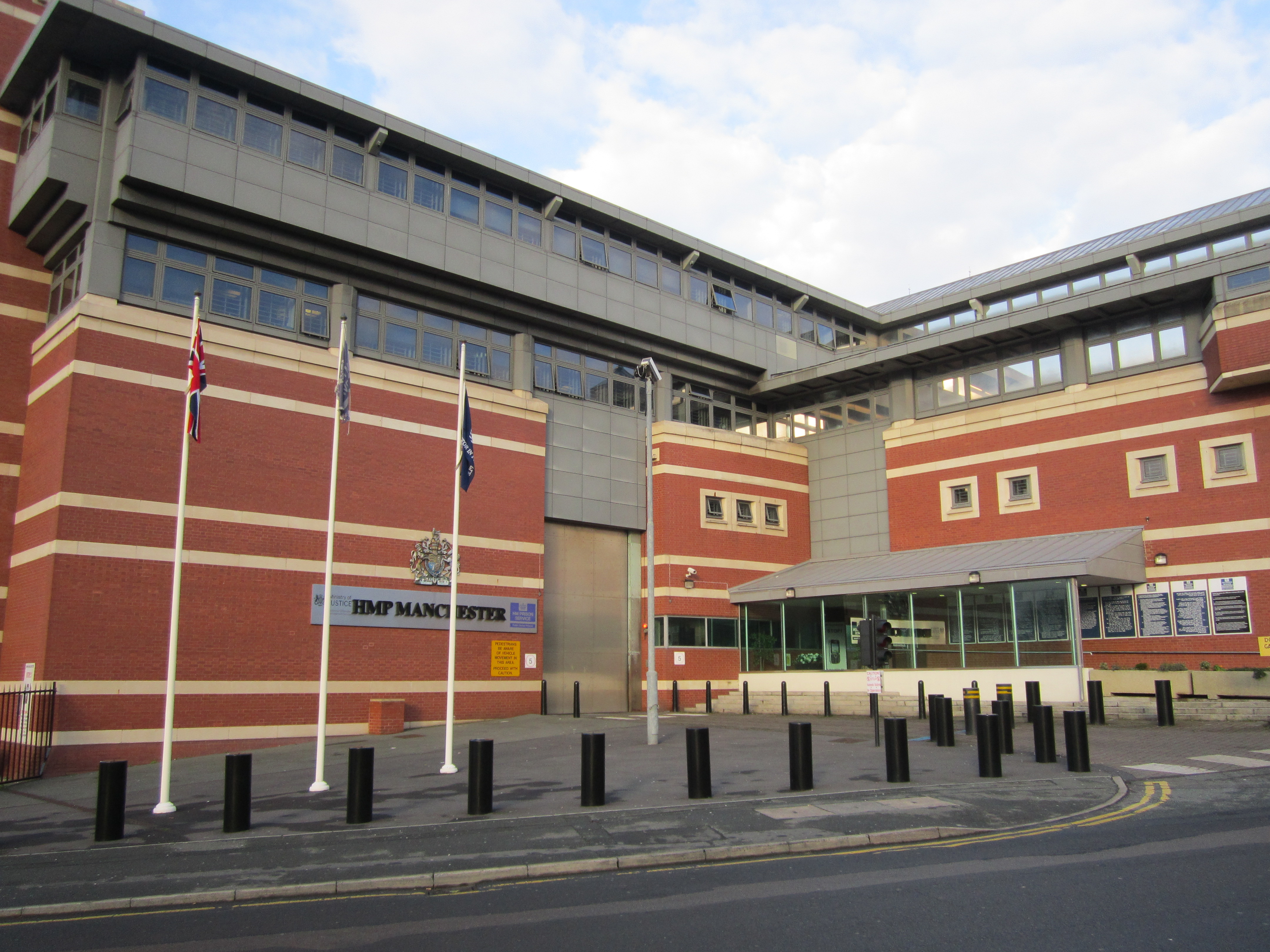
Prison entrance in 2014

In 2015 The Daily Telegraph reported that a drone aircraft was being used in an attempt to deliver drugs and smartphones to precise locations within the prison.

In 2016 Nicky Reilly, also known as Mohammed Saeed Alim, a Muslim convert was found dead in his cell after hanging himself. Reilly had a chronic history of self harm, and it was also known that he was autistic and had a personality disorder. A jury decided it was "more likely than not" that he did not intend to die and "acted impulsively." It is unclear if Reilly understood the concept of death or could form the intent to die. Senior coroner, Joanne Kearsley said evidence given at the court raised "significant concerns." Kearsley said she was not convinced the prison had a clear plan and awareness of his needs and she questioned why he was not under a care programme approach (CPA) where care coordinators are given to individual prisoners. The coroner asked whether a type of review should be considered for prisoners with recognised lifelong mental health problems and chronic risk of self-harm.

In 2017 a report by the Independent Monitoring Board described Manchester Prison as squalid, vermin infested and reminiscent of Dickensian England. The report added that the prison urgently needed modernisation and assaults on staff have risen owing to staff shortages.

In 2022 Manchester City Council leader Bev Craig called on the Ministry of Justice (MoJ) to move HMP Manchester elsewhere in the region, as the building is "not suitable for the significant remodelling or expansion it would need to meet modern-day requirements for a prison". However, the MoJ said there were "no plans to close or relocate" the jail.

== Notable inmates ==
- Joey Barton, footballer jailed for assault.
- Brendan Behan, Irish republican, playwright and poet, imprisoned in Strangeways in 1947 for attempting to free an IRA prisoner.
- Ian Brady, held for theft prior to the Moors murders.
- Mark Bridger – a paedophile who abducted and murdered a 5-year-old girl. Was held at Strangeways on remand; moved to HM Prison Wakefield after being sentenced.
- David Britton, author of Lord Horror, the last publication to be banned under the Obscene Publications Act.
- Charles Bronson, a criminal who has been referred to in the British press as the "most violent prisoner in Britain" and "Britain's most notorious prisoner".
- Ian Brown, musician and singer-songwriter jailed for "air rage". Wrote three songs inside: "Free My Way", "So Many Soldiers", and "Set My Baby Free". Released in December 1999.
- Valdo Calocane, perpetrator of the 2023 Nottingham attacks in which three people were stabbed to death and three others were injured. Held at HMP Manchester briefly whilst awaiting trial before later being transferred to Ashworth Hospital.
- Thomas Cashman, convicted of shooting dead a nine-year-old girl in Liverpool in August 2022.
- Connor Chapman, the gunman from the Christmas Eve 2022 Wallasey pub shooting.
- Dale Cregan, held there on remand whilst awaiting trial for murder.
- Emily Davison, suffragette, sentenced to a month's hard labour in 1909 after throwing rocks at the carriage of chancellor David Lloyd George. Hunger strike led to force feeding. Blockaded herself in her cell and sued Strangeways for using a water cannon.
- David Dickinson, TV presenter specialising in antiques, imprisoned for fraud in pre-celebrity days.
- James Inglis, the world's fastest hanging.
- Benjamin Mendy, French football player.
- Christabel Pankhurst, suffragette, was held for a week.
- Gordon Park, convicted in 2005 of murdering his first wife, Carol Park, in 1976.
- Harold Shipman, serial killer, who was held there on remand whilst awaiting trial.
- Reynhard Sinaga, an Indonesian serial rapist found guilty of assaulting 48 men and 136 counts of rape.
- Kiaran Stapleton, shot dead an Indian international student in December 2011.
- Ray Teret – former radio DJ and friend of Jimmy Savile convicted of a series of sexual offences, including seven rapes, for which he was sentenced to 25 years in prison. Died at HMP Manchester in 2021.
- Catherine Tolson and Helen Tolson, suffragette sisters imprisoned in 1909 for breaking glass at White City in Manchester.

== See also ==
- Listed buildings in Manchester-M60
