= Anuja Akathoottu =

Indian Malayalam language writer (born 1987)

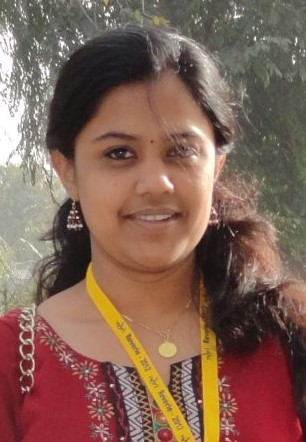
- Born: Anuja A. R. July 1987 (age 39); Paipra, Ernakulam district, Kerala, India
- Education: PhD in Agricultural Economics
- Occupations: Writer, Scientist
- Spouse: Muhammad Aslam M.K.
- Children: 1
- Parent(s): Paipra Radhakrishnan; Nalini Bekal
- Writing career
- Genres: Poems and short stories
- Notable work: Amma Urangunnilla
- Notable awards: Sahitya Akademi Yuva Puraskar, ONV Yuva Sahitya Puraskaram

Anuja Akathoottu is a Malayalam language poet and short story writer from Kerala, India. In 2019, she received the Sahitya Akademi Yuva Puraskar for her collection of poems Amma Urangunnilla.

== Biography ==
Anuja A. R. known as Anuja Akathoottu was born in 1987 in Paipra near Muvattupuzha in Ernakulam district, as the daughter of Paipra Radhakrishnan and Nalini Bekal. She was educated at Sacred Heart, Thrissur, Little Flower, Muvattupuzha, and St. Augustine's Higher Secondary School, Muvattupuzha. She completed BSc (Agriculture) from Kerala Agricultural University with university rank and PG and PhD from Indian Agricultural Research Institute, New Delhi with IARI Gold Medal for PG. In 2009, she participated in the National Camp for Young Writers organized by the Sahitya Akademi. Anuja works as a scientist at the Central Marine Fisheries Research Institute, Kochi, and her specialisation is Agricultural/Fisheries Economics.

== Works ==
- Amma Urangunnilla (poetry collection), DC Books, Kottayam
- Aromayude Vastrangal (short story collection), Current Books, Thrissur
- Pothuvakya Sammelanam (short story collection), Current Books, Thrissur
- Koottu

== Honours and awards ==
- 2019 Sahitya Akademi Yuva Puraskar
- Abu Dhabi Sakthi Award
- 2006 V. T. Kumaran Award
- Ayyappa Paniker Memorial Poetry Award
- Kamala Surayya Award
