= Nalini Bekal =

Malayalam Novelist and Shortstory writer (born 1954)

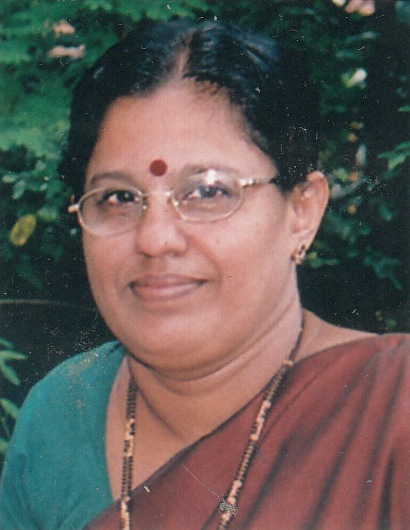
- Born: Nalini; 15 October 1954 (age 71); Bekal, Kasaragod
- Education: B.A.
- Occupation: writer
- Spouse: Paipra Radhakrishnan
- Children: Dr. Anuradha, Anuja Akathoottu
- Writing career
- Language: Malayalam
- Notable works: Muchilottamma,Ottakkolam,

Nalini Bekal (born 15 October 1954) is a Malayalam novelist and short story writer. She has written many novels and short stories, and won many awards including the Mathrubhumi Novel Award (1977), Edasseri Award (1987), SBI Award (1992), and Kerala Sahitya Academy Fellowship.

== Personal life ==
Nalini was born in Bekal village in Kasaragod District of Kerala State. Nalini's husband Paipra Radhakrishnan is a notable writer, columnist and critic in the Malayalam language. They have two daughters, Dr. Anuradha (Ayurveda Medical Officer) and Anuja Akathoottu.

== Works ==
=== Novels ===
- Thuruth (1977) ISBN 9788182654686
- Hamsaganam (1982) ISBN 978-9385269998
- Krishna (1985) ISBN 978-8130404189
- Muchilottamma (1987)
- Kanwatheertha (1988) ISBN 978-1155461540
- Shilavanangal (1993)

=== Short story collections ===
- Ottakkolam (1993)

== Awards and recognitions ==
=== Literary awards ===
- 1977: Mathrubhumi Novel Award for Thruthu
- 1987: Edasseri Award for Mutchilottamma
- 1992: SBI Award for Mutchilottamma

=== Fellowships ===
- 1995: Kerala Sahithya Academy Fellowship
