= William Henry Bury =

English murderer and "Jack the Ripper" suspect (1859–1889)

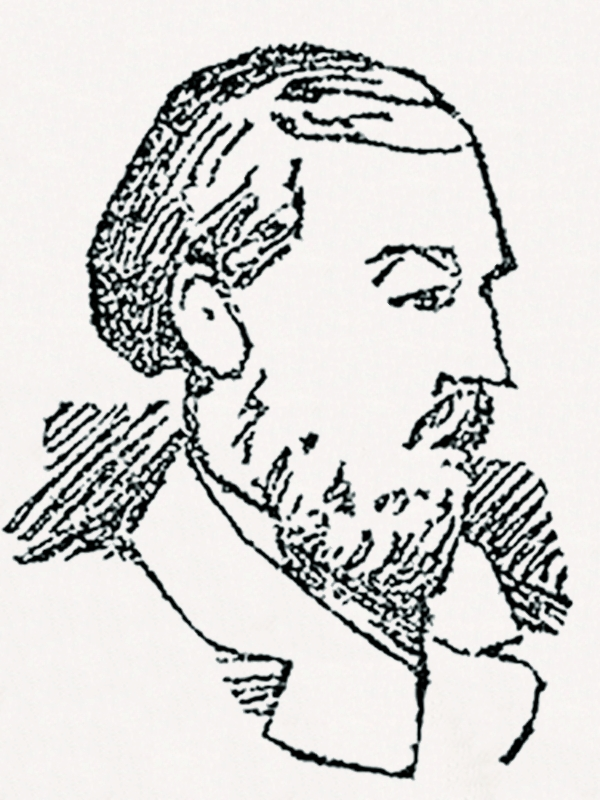
- Sketch of Bury from The Dundee Courier, 12 February 1889. He had dark hair and a beard, was 5 feet 3 1/2 inches (1.613 m) tall, and weighed less than 10 stone (64 kg).
- Born: 25 May 1859; Stourbridge, Worcestershire, England
- Died: 24 April 1889 (aged 29); Dundee, Scotland
- Occupation: Sawdust merchant
- Spouse: Ellen Elliot (m. 1888; died 1889)
- Conviction: Murder of Ellen Bury
- Penalty: Execution by hanging

William Henry Bury (25 May 1859 – 24 April 1889) was suspected of being the serial killer "Jack the Ripper". He was hanged for the murder of his wife Ellen in 1889, and was the last person executed in Dundee, Scotland.

Bury was orphaned at an early age and was educated at a charitable school in the English Midlands. After a few years in regular employment, he fell into financial difficulty, was dismissed for theft, and became a street peddler. In 1887 he moved to London, where he married Ellen Elliot, who was probably a prostitute. During their stormy marriage, which lasted just over a year, they faced increasing financial hardship. In January 1889, they moved to Dundee. The following month, Bury strangled his wife with a rope, stabbed her dead body with a penknife, and hid the corpse in a box in their room. A few days later, he presented himself to the local police and was arrested for her murder. Tried and convicted, he was sentenced to death by hanging. Shortly before his execution, he confessed to the crime. Although Bury's guilt was not in doubt, Dundee had a history of opposition to the death penalty and The Dundee Courier printed an editorial the day after his execution decrying the "judicial butcheries" of capital punishment.

Bury killed his wife shortly after the height of the London Whitechapel murders, which were attributed to the unidentified serial killer "Jack the Ripper". Bury's previous abode near Whitechapel and similarities between the Ripper's crimes and Bury's led the press, as well as executioner James Berry, to suggest that Bury was the Ripper. Bury protested his innocence in the Ripper crimes, and the police discounted him as a suspect. Later authors have built on the earlier accusations, but the idea that Bury was the Ripper is not widely accepted.

== Childhood and youth ==
William Bury was born in Stourbridge, Worcestershire, the youngest of four children of Henry Bury and his wife Mary Jane (née Henley). He was orphaned in infancy. His father, who worked for a local fishmonger called Joscelyne, died in a horse and cart accident in Halesowen on 10 April 1860. While on an incline, he fell beneath the wheels of his fish cart and was killed when the horse bolted and pulled the cart over his prone body. William's mother may have been suffering from post-natal depression at the time of her husband's death and was committed to the Worcester County Pauper and Lunatic Asylum on 7 May 1860 suffering from melancholia. She remained there until her death aged 33 on 30 March 1864.

William's eldest sibling, Elizabeth Ann, died at the age of seven during an epileptic seizure on 7 September 1859, which may have contributed to Mary Jane's depression. The other two children, Joseph Henry and Mary Jane, both died before 1889. William was raised initially in Dudley by his maternal uncle, Edward Henley, and by 1871 he was enrolled at the Blue Coat charity school in Stourbridge.

At the age of sixteen, he found work as a factor's clerk in a warehouse at Horseley Fields, Wolverhampton, until the early 1880s when he left the warehouse after failing to repay a loan. He then worked for a lock manufacturer called Osborne in Lord Street, Wolverhampton, until he was dismissed for theft in either 1884 or 1885. For the next few years, his whereabouts are not known for certain, but he appears to have lived an unsettled life in the English Midlands and Yorkshire. In 1887, he was making a living as a hawker, selling small items such as pencils and key rings on the streets of Snow Hill, Birmingham.

== London ==
In October 1887, Bury arrived in Bow, London, and found work selling sawdust for James Martin, who appears to have run a brothel at 80 Quickett Street, Bow. Initially, Bury lived in the stable, but later moved into the house. There, he met Ellen Elliot, who was employed by Martin as a servant and probably a prostitute.

Ellen was born on 24 October 1856 in Walworth, London, at the Bricklayer's Arms public house run by her father, George Elliot. In adult life, she worked as a needlewoman and in a jute processing factory. In 1883, she had an illegitimate daughter, also called Ellen, who died in Poplar workhouse in December 1885. Within a year of the death of her daughter, she began working for Martin. In March 1888, Ellen and William left Martin's employ and moved to a furnished room at 3 Swaton Road, Bow, where they lived together until their marriage on Easter Monday, 2 April 1888, at Bromley Parish Church. Martin later said he had dismissed William because of unpaid debts.

Martin and the landlady at 3 Swaton Road, Elizabeth Haynes, described Bury as a violent drunk. On 7 April 1888, Haynes caught Bury kneeling on his bride of five days threatening to cut her throat with a knife. Haynes subsequently evicted them, and Ellen sold one of six £100 shares in a railway company that she had inherited from a maiden aunt, Margaret Barren, to pay William's debt to Martin. (Note: Each share had a face value of £100 (equivalent to about £11,110 as of 2025) but the real value was less than half that because the valuation of the company had fallen.) William was re-employed by Martin, and the couple moved to 11 Blackthorn Street, close to Swaton Road. According to Martin, William had developed a venereal disease. In June, Ellen sold the remaining shares, and in August they moved to 3 Spanby Road, adjacent to where William stabled his horse. With the money from the shares, the couple had a week's holiday in Wolverhampton with a drinking friend of William's and Ellen bought new jewellery. William continued to assault his wife throughout the latter half of 1888. By the first week of December, Ellen's windfall was nearly spent, and William sold his horse and cart. In January the following year, he told his landlord at 3 Spanby Road that he was thinking of emigrating to Brisbane, Australia, and asked him to make two wooden crates for the journey. Instead, William and Ellen moved to Dundee in Scotland. Ellen was not keen to go and only did so after William lied that he had obtained a position in a jute factory there.

== Dundee ==
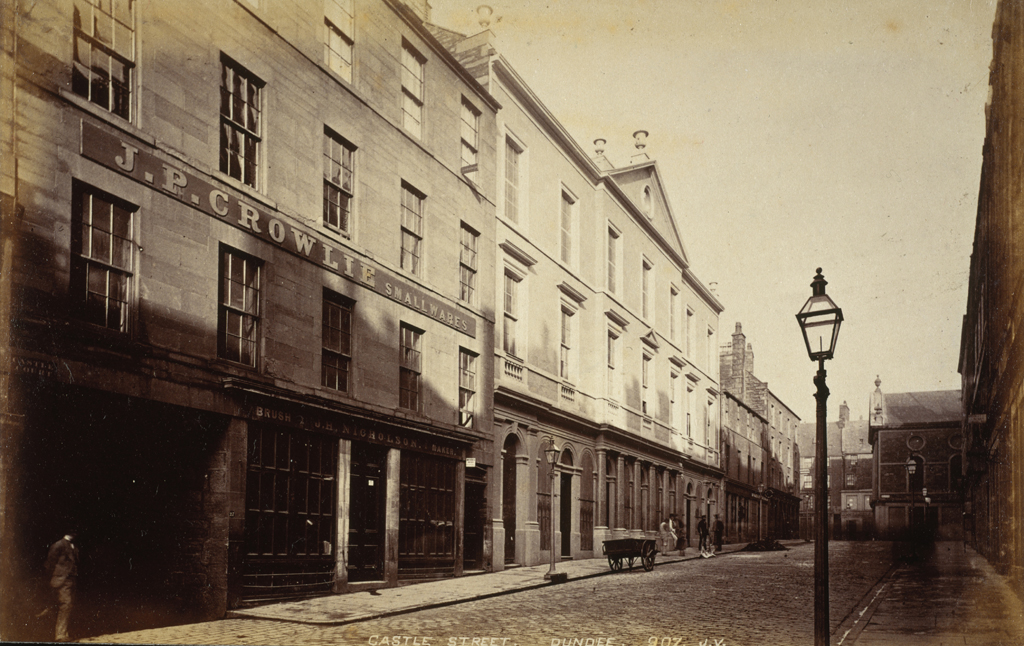
Dundee, c. 1876

The Burys travelled north as second-class passengers on the steamer Cambria. They arrived at Dundee on the evening of 20 January 1889, and the following morning they rented a room above a bar at 43 Union Street. The Burys stayed for only eight days before they moved on 29 January to a squat at 113 Prince's Street, a basement flat under a shop. William had obtained the key under false pretences by telling the letting agents that he was a viewer interested in renting the property. Meanwhile, Ellen found a job as a cleaner at a local mill, but she quit after a day. William continued to drink heavily, often with a decorator called David Walker, who was re-painting the public house frequented by William.

On Monday 4 February, William bought some rope at the local grocer's shop, and spent the rest of the day observing cases at the Sheriff Court from the public gallery. He was later reported to have listened attentively to the proceedings. On 7 February, he attended the court sessions again. On 10 February, he visited his acquaintance Walker, who lent him a newspaper that featured a woman's suicide by hanging. Walker asked Bury to look up any news of Jack the Ripper, at which Bury threw down the newspaper with a fright. That evening, he walked into the Dundee Central Police Station on Bell Street and reported his wife's suicide to Lieutenant James Parr. He said they had been drinking heavily the night before her death, and he had woken in the morning to find his wife's body on the floor with a rope around her neck. Bury had not summoned a doctor, but had instead cut the body and concealed it in one of the packing cases brought from London. Bury told Parr that his actions were now preying on his mind, and he was afraid that he would be arrested and accused of being Jack the Ripper.

Parr took Bury upstairs to see Lieutenant David Lamb, the head of the detective department. Parr told Lamb, "This man has a wonderful story to tell you." Bury retold his story to Lamb, but omitted the reference to Jack the Ripper, and added that he had stabbed his wife's body once. Bury was searched, and a small knife, bankbook and his house key were confiscated pending inquiries. Lamb and Detective Constable Peter Campbell proceeded to the Burys' dingy flat, where they discovered the mutilated remains of Ellen stuffed into the wooden box Bury had commissioned in London.

== Investigation ==
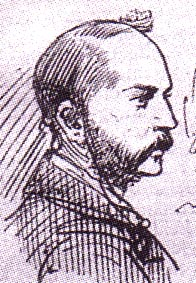
Inspector Frederick Abberline of Scotland Yard interviewed Bury's former employer and landlords.

Lamb returned to the police station and charged William with Ellen's murder. Ellen's jewellery, found in William's pockets, was confiscated. A preliminary search of the premises revealed chalk graffiti on the rear door of the flat, which read "Jack Ripper [sic] is at the back of this door", and on the stairwell leading up from the rear of the property, which read "Jack Ripper is in this seller [sic]". The press and the police thought they had been written by a local boy before the tragedy, but the writer was never identified. A more extensive search the following morning found blood-stained clothing in the crate that had contained the body, and the remains of more clothing and some of Ellen's personal effects burned in the fireplace. The flat was bereft of furniture, indicating that it may have been burnt on the fire, either for heat or to destroy evidence. A large penknife was found with human flesh and blood upon it, and the rope that William had bought on the morning of 4 February was found with strands of Ellen's hair caught in the fibres.

Ellen's body was examined by five physicians: police surgeon Charles Templeman, his colleague Alexander Stalker, Edinburgh surgeon Henry Littlejohn and two local doctors, David Lennox and William Kinnear. They concluded that Ellen had been strangled from behind. Her right leg was broken in two places so it could be crammed into the crate. Incisions, made by the penknife, ran downwards along her abdomen and had been made "within at most ten minutes of the time of death" according to Templeman, Stalker and Littlejohn. Lennox disagreed and thought the wounds were made later on the basis that when he examined the body the wound was not everted, but Templeman and Stalker said the wound was everted when they examined the body. Littlejohn explained that as Lennox made his examination three days after the others, the shape of the wounds could have changed, to which Lennox agreed.

Chief Constable Dewar sent a telegraph detailing the circumstances of the crime to the London Metropolitan Police, which was investigating the crimes attributed to Jack the Ripper. Detectives from London did not consider Bury a realistic suspect in their investigation into the Ripper murders, but Inspector Frederick Abberline did interview witnesses in Whitechapel connected to Bury, including William's former employer James Martin and landlords Elizabeth Haynes and William Smith. According to the executioner James Berry and crime reporter Norman Hastings, Scotland Yard sent two detectives to interview Bury, but there is no surviving record of the visit in the police archive.

== Trial and execution ==
On 18 March 1889, Bury was arraigned for the murder of his wife; he entered a plea of not guilty. The trial was seen before Lord Young in the High Court of Justiciary on 28 March. Bury's defence team comprised solicitor David Tweedie and advocate William Hay; the prosecution was led by advocate depute Dugald or Dill McKechnie. The hearing lasted 13 hours. The prosecution witnesses included Ellen's sister Margaret Corney, William's former employer James Martin, the Burys' London landlady Elizabeth Haynes, William's drinking partner David Walker, Lieutenant Lamb and Drs Templeman and Littlejohn. After a break for supper, Hay presented the defence case, which was heavily dependent on Dr Lennox's testimony that Ellen had strangled herself. At 10:05 p.m., Lord Young finished his summation, and the jury of 15 men retired to consider their verdict. After 25 minutes, the jury returned with a verdict of guilty with a recommendation for mercy. Lord Young asked the jury why they recommended mercy, and one of them replied that the medical evidence was contradictory, referring to Lennox's testimony. Dundee had a history of opposition to the death penalty, and the jury may have been trying to avoid passing a death sentence. Young told the jury to retire and reconsider their verdict until they were decided by the evidence one way or another. At 10:40 p.m., they returned with a unanimous verdict of guilty. Lord Young passed the mandatory sentence for murder: death by hanging.

On 1 April, Bury's solicitor, David Tweedie, petitioned the Secretary of State for Scotland, Lord Lothian, for clemency. Tweedie argued that the sentence should be commuted to life imprisonment on the grounds of the conflicting medical evidence and the jury's initial reservations. Tweedie further argued that Bury could have inherited insanity from his mother, who had died in a lunatic asylum. A clergyman whom Bury had befriended, Edward John Gough, minister of St Paul's Episcopalian Church in Dundee, also wrote to Lothian asking for a reprieve. The Secretary of State refused to intervene in the normal course of the law, and Bury was hanged on 24 April by executioner James Berry. The following day, The Dundee Courier printed an editorial lambasting capital punishment:

There are still to be found persons who profess that when one murder has taken place a second should follow. Yesterday's proceedings amounted to nothing less than cold-blooded murder ... [which] perpetuate judicial butcheries ... it is not pleasant to be assured that it is incumbent upon men to slay one or two of their fellow-creatures occasionally for the purpose of keeping humanity human.

It was the last execution held in Dundee.

A few days before the execution, Bury confessed to Reverend Gough that he had killed Ellen. At the urging of Gough, William wrote a confession on 22 April 1889, which he asked to be withheld until after he was dead. William claimed that he had strangled Ellen without premeditation on the night of 4 February 1889 during a drunken row over money, and that he had tried to dismember the body for disposal the next day but was too squeamish to continue. The latter part of this confession does not match the expert testimony of the physicians, who said that the incisions were made "within at most ten minutes of the time of death" rather than the next day. William stated he had stuffed Ellen's body into the crate as part of a later plan for disposal, but instead concocted the suicide story when he realised that Ellen's absence would be noted.

== Jack the Ripper suspect ==
Traditionally, five murders (known as the "canonical five") are attributed to the notorious serial killer "Jack the Ripper", who terrorised Whitechapel in the East End of London between August and November 1888. Authorities are not agreed on the exact number of the Ripper's victims, and at least eleven Whitechapel murders between April 1888 and February 1891 were included in the same extensive police investigation. All the crimes remain unsolved.

Claims that Bury could have been the Ripper began to appear in newspapers shortly after Bury's arrest. Like Bury, the Ripper had inflicted abdominal wounds on his victims immediately after their deaths, and Bury lived in Bow, near Whitechapel, from October 1887 to January 1889, which placed him fairly near the Whitechapel murders at the appropriate time. The Dundee Advertiser of 12 February claimed that the Burys' "neighbours were startled and alarmed at the idea that one whom in their terror they associated with the Whitechapel tragedies had been living in their midst." The New York Times of the same day connected Bury directly to the atrocities and reported the theory that William had murdered Ellen to prevent her from revealing his guilt, a story picked up and repeated by The Dundee Courier the following day. The Courier alleged that Bury admitted to Lieutenant Parr that he was Jack the Ripper, but Parr's version of the story says only that Bury said he was afraid he would be arrested as Jack the Ripper. Bury denied any connection, despite making a full confession to his wife's murder. Nevertheless, the executioner James Berry promoted the idea that Bury was the Ripper. Berry did not include Bury or the Ripper in his memoirs, My Experiences as an Executioner, but Ernest A. Parr, a journalist in the Suffolk town of Newmarket, wrote to the Secretary of State for Scotland on 28 March 1908 that Berry "told me explicitly that Bury was known to have been Jack the Ripper".

In the 1920s, Norman Hastings built on Berry's hypothesis proposing Bury as the Ripper; 100 years after the Ripper murders, William Beadle and Dundee librarian Euan Macpherson published books and articles popularising Bury as a Ripper suspect. They highlighted that the canonical five Whitechapel murders ended in November 1888, which roughly coincided with Bury's departure from Whitechapel. There was graffiti at Bury's Dundee flat that implied that Jack the Ripper lived there, and Macpherson supposed this was written by Bury as a form of confession. William took Ellen's rings, and the Ripper is believed to have taken rings from victim Annie Chapman. Bury was persistently violent to his wife, threatened her with a knife, and cut open her abdomen after death in a manner not dissimilar to the Whitechapel murderer. In a conversation with her neighbours, Marjory Smith, who ran the shop above the Burys' Prince's Street flat in Dundee, asked them "What sort of work was this you Whitechapel folk have been about, letting Jack the Ripper kill so many people?" Bury did not answer her, but Ellen replied "Jack the Ripper is quiet now." She reportedly told another neighbour, "Jack the Ripper is taking a rest." Beadle and Macpherson argued that Ellen's comments might indicate that she had knowledge of the Ripper's whereabouts.

Others contend that Bury only imitated the Ripper, citing differences between their crimes. Ellen Bury was strangled with a rope and sustained comparatively few knife wounds compared to the Ripper's victims, whose throats were cut prior to sustaining deep abdominal slashes. Ellen Bury's throat was not cut, and only relatively shallow cuts were made to her abdomen. The identity of the Whitechapel murderer is unknown, and over one hundred suspects, in addition to Bury, have been proposed. While some Ripper writers consider Bury a more likely culprit than many of the other suspects, other writers dismiss the theory because, "as happens all too frequently in this field, the theorizing appears to have a few disturbing leaps of logic as well as mere anecdotes used as evidence."
