= Paipra Radhakrishnan =

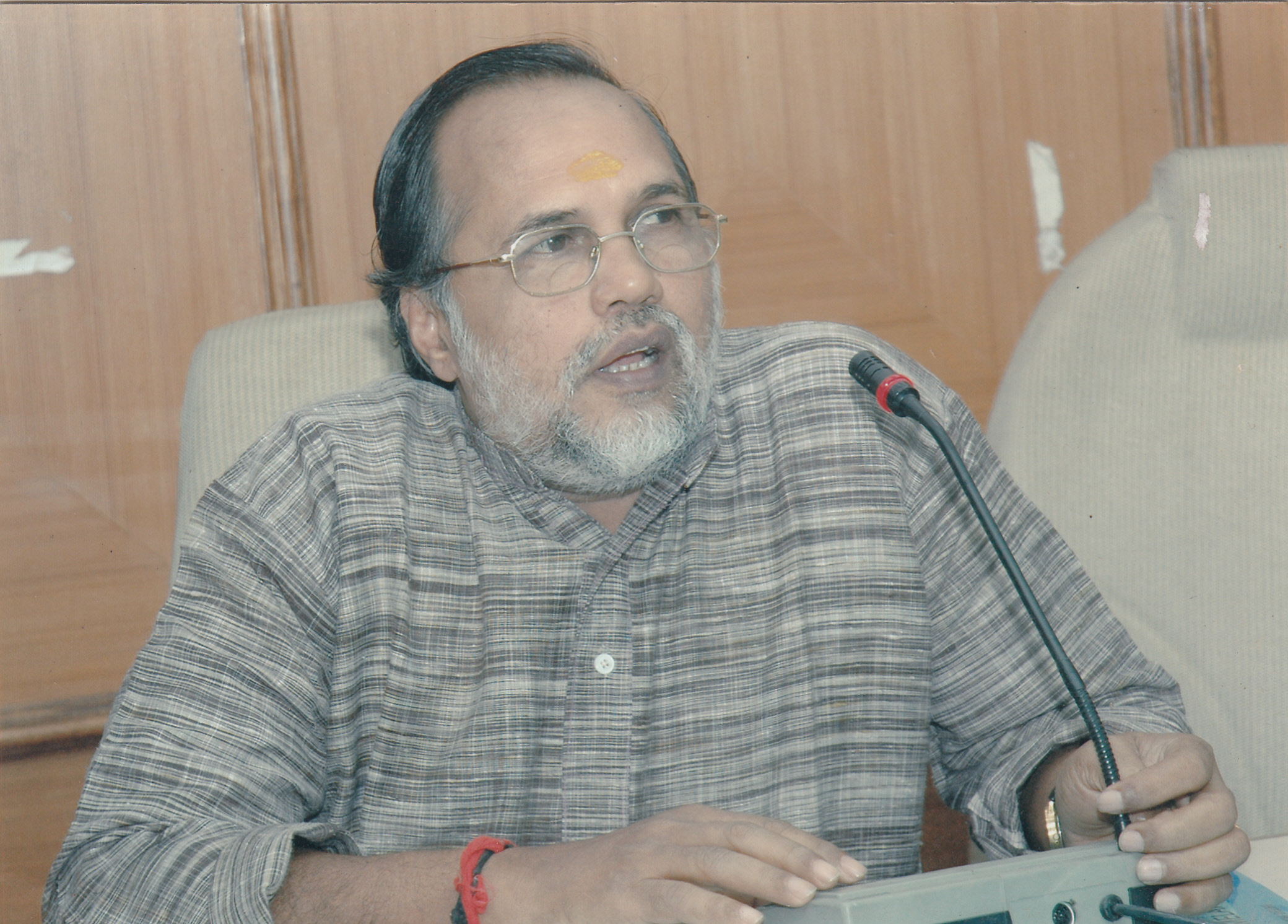
- Born: Radhakrishnan Kartha; 12 September 1952 (age 73); Paipra, Ernakulam
- Education: M.A., B.Ed.
- Alma mater: Paipra Govt. UPS, Cheruvattoor GHS, Maharaja's College, Ernakulam, Sree Sankara Vidyapeetom, NSS Training Institute, Changanassery
- Occupations: Malayalam writer, columnist
- Spouse: Nalini Bekal
- Children: Dr. Anuradha, Anuja Akathoottu
- Writing career
- Language: Malayalam
- Notable works: Kathuvacha maunam, Alathachakram, Paipra- Innale, Innu

Paipra Radhakrishnan is a Malayalam writer, columnist, editor and cultural observer. He was the Secretary of Kerala Sahitya Akademi during the period 1991-1995. He is the president of Akshaya Pusthaka Nidhi, and Director, Arshavidyapeedom. He writes the much acclaimed cultural critic column Aazhchavettom in Kalakaumudi weekly. He has authored many books of short stories, essays, and children's literature.

== Personal life ==
Paipra Radhakrishnan was born in a small village of Paipra, in Ernakulam district to Vadakkanchery Akathoottu Bhargavi Kunjamma and Methala Thattayath Puthankottayil Neelakandan Karthav. He completed his studies from Govt. UPS, Paipra and GHS Cheruvattoor, Sree Sankara Vidyapeetom, Maharaja's College, Ernakulam, and NSS Training College, Changanassery. He worked in various Civil Supplies Department and Public Education Department, Govt. of Kerala. He retired from Govt. service as High School Teacher from Govt. HSS, Methala during the year 2007. His wife Nalini Bekal is a famous novelist and writer in Malayalam. They have two daughter, Dr. Anuradha Dilip works as Ayurveda Medical Officer and Anuja Akathoottu is agricultural economist by profession. Anuja writes poems in Malayalam and published two books, Pothuvakya Sammelanam and Aromayude Vastrangal and won many state level poetry awards.

== Posts held ==
- Consultant Editor, Rubber Magazine, Rubber Board

== Works ==
Short Story Collections

- kathuvacha Maunam
- Alaathachakram
- Penthookkam
- Thiranjedutha Kathakal

Novels

- Velipaadukal

Children's Literature

- Prakaasham parathunnavar
- Gurudakshina
- Uthankan

Essays

- Vilkaaund Swakaryathakal
- Nanmathinmakalude Pathayam

Editor

- Paipra; Innale, Innu
- Kera Shabda Kosham
