= Anuj Batra =

American electrical engineer

Anuj Batra is a research electrical engineer at Texas Instruments, specializing in ultrawideband wireless technology.

He holds a BS in electrical engineering from Cornell University, an MS in electrical engineering from Stanford University, and a Ph.D. in electrical engineering from Georgia Tech. In 2004, he was recognized as a "young innovator" by inclusion in the MIT Technology Review's "TR100" list.
