= Manchester Assize Courts =

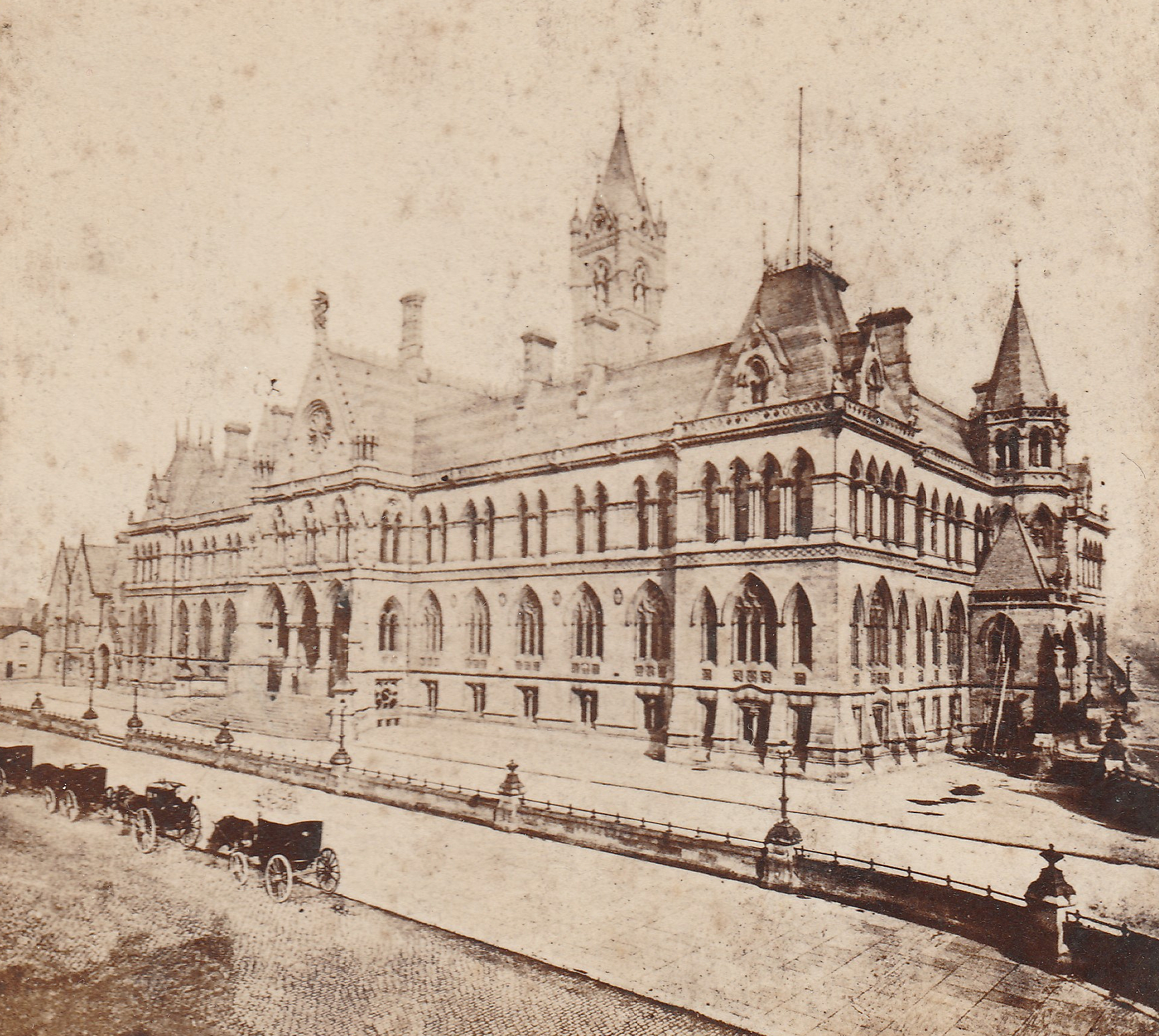
- Interactive map of the Manchester Assize Courts area

General information
- Status: Demolished
- Type: Venetian Gothic
- Location: Strangeways, Manchester, Lancashire
- Coordinates: 53°29′30″N 2°14′53″W
- Construction started: 1859
- Completed: 1864
- Demolished: 1957 (ruins from the Manchester Blitz)

Height
- Antenna spire: 85 m (279 ft)
- Roof: 80 m (260 ft)

Technical details
- Floor area: 7

Design and construction
- Architect: Alfred Waterhouse

The Manchester Assize Courts was a building housing law courts on Great Ducie Street in the Strangeways district of Manchester, England. It was 279 ft (85 m) tall and from 1864 to 1877 the tallest building in Manchester. Widely admired, it has been referred to as one of Britain's 'lost buildings'. It was severely damaged by wartime bombing in the Manchester Blitz, and the remains were demolished in 1957.

== History ==
The Assize Courts was the first civic building to be constructed in Manchester after the town hall on King Street by Francis Goodwin in 1819. The Builder described it as the most important building outside Whitehall. Its design was the result of a competition in 1858 that attracted more than 100 entries. The competition was won by Alfred Waterhouse whose design beat schemes from other renowned architects such as Thomas Worthington and Edward Walters.

Waterhouse designed the building in the Venetian Gothic style; construction began in 1859 and was completed in 1864. The nearby 1862 Strangeways Prison was included in his design as part of the scheme; it is a Grade II listed structure.

The building contained exterior sculptures by Thomas Woolner and the firm of O'Shea and Whelan. They depicted lawgivers from history, along with a "drunk woman", a "good woman", a scene of the Judgment of Solomon and carvings depicting different punishments throughout history.

As part of the court system changes, the assize court system in Manchester was abolished in 1956 and changed to the Crown Court system. The courts building was severely damaged in the Manchester Blitz in 1940 and 1941. It was said that everything was destroyed except the Great Ducie Street facade and the judges' lodgings. Some war-damaged buildings in the city were repaired, but Manchester Assize Courts was demolished in 1957, soon after the assize court abolition. Some of the sculptures were preserved and incorporated into the new Crown Court building on Crown Square.

== Gallery ==
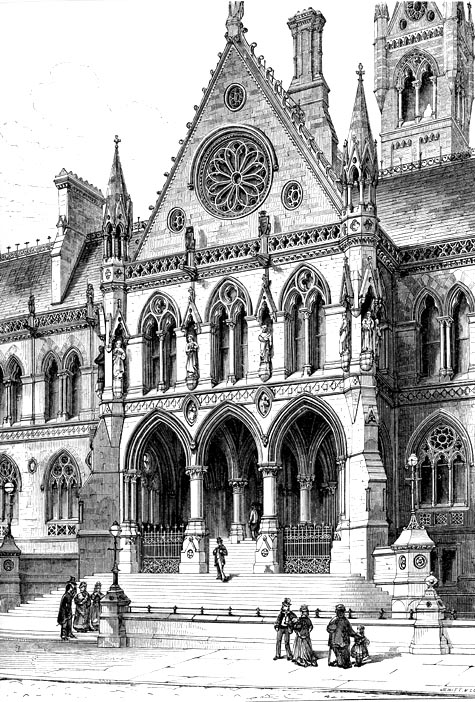
Illustration of the Assize Courts from Charles Eastlake's History of the Gothic Revival

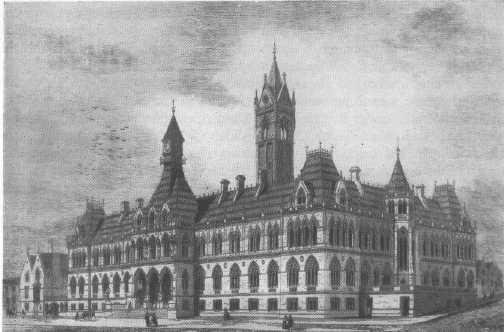
Alternative view

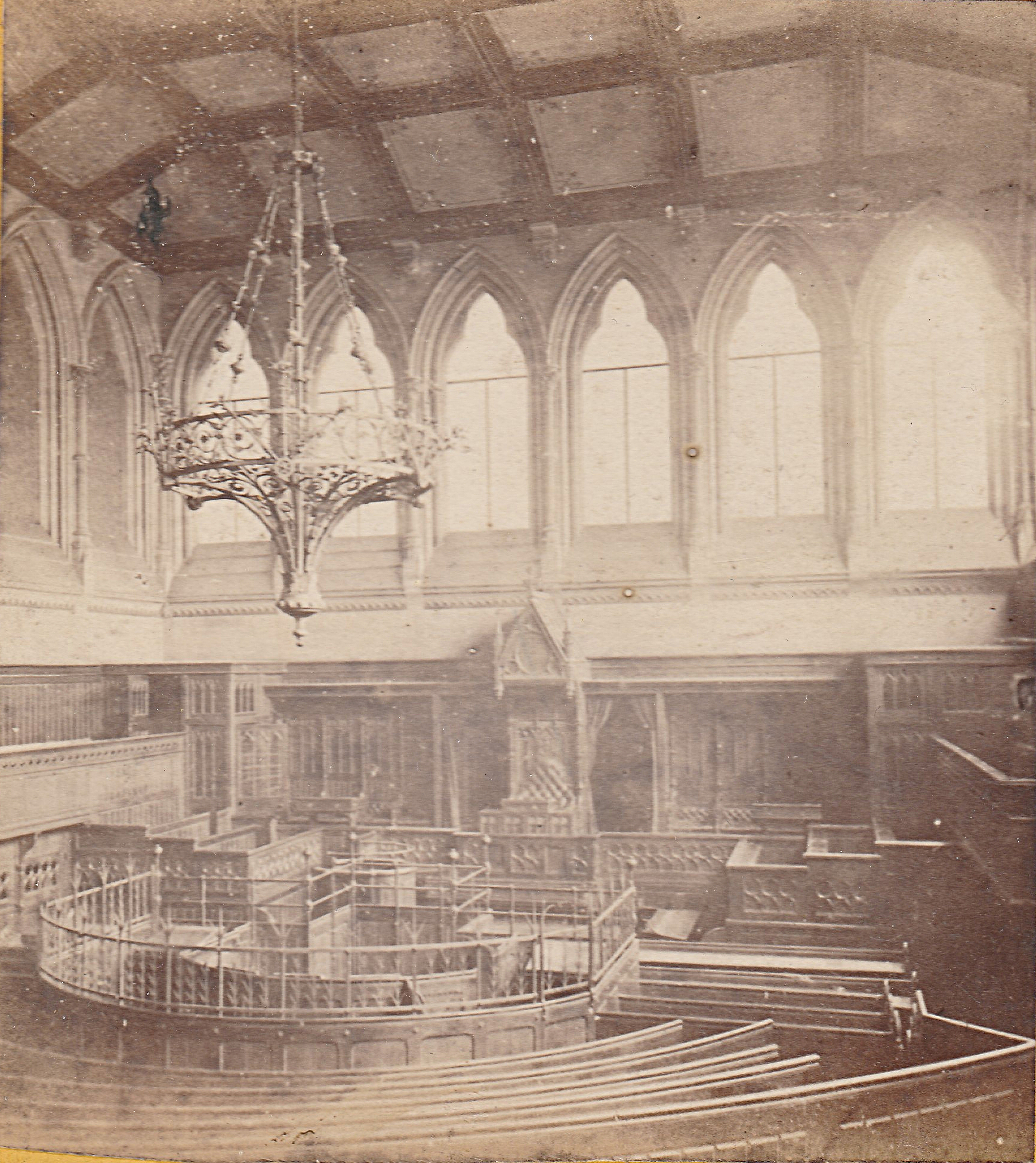
Image of interior

== See also ==
- Assize court
