= Anuja village =

Anuja
- Village
- Location within Bihar
- Coordinates: 27.108°N 84.464°E
- Country: India
- State: Bihar
- District: West Champaran district

Government
  - Type: Panchayati raj (India)
  - Body: Gram panchayat

Languages
  - Official: Hindi
- Time zone: UTC+5:30 (IST)
- ISO 3166 code: IN-BR

Anuja is a village in West Champaran district in the Indian state of Bihar.

== Demographics ==
As of the 2011 census of India, Anuja had a population of 5561 in 1022 households. Males constitute 51.86% of the population and females 48.13%. Anuja has an average literacy rate of 40%, lower than the national average of 74%: male literacy is 63.9%, and female literacy is 36%. In Anuja, 21.5% of the population is under 6 years of age.
