= Anuj Dass =

Indian cricketer (born 1974)

Anuj Dass (born 4 January 1974) was an Indian cricketer. He was a right-handed batsman and right-arm off-break bowler who played for Himachal Pradesh. He was born in Himachal Pradesh.

Dass made his cricketing debut for Himachal Pradesh's Under-16 team during the 1990-91 Vijay Merchant Trophy, in which he played four matches. He made a single first-class appearance for the side, during the 1999–2000 season, against Jammu and Kashmir. From the lower-middle order, he scored 10 runs in the only innings in which he batted. He made two List B appearances during the season, scoring all but one of his runs in the second match in which he played.
