= Veer Bala Rastogi =

Indian author of biology textbooks

Veer Bala Rastogi is a writer of textbooks on biology in India. She earned her master's degree in Zoology with distinction standing first in order of merit, and for this feat, she was awarded Gold Medal. She did her Ph.D. from Meerut University under the guidance of eminent zoologist, Dr. M.L. Bhatia, Professor in Zoology, University of Delhi as External Supervisor.

Rastogi is a member of Fellow of Academy of Zoology and was also a member of Textbook Evaluation Committee, NCERT, New Delhi. She was a member of academic staff of Zoology, Meerut College, Meerut during 1961–1967, teaching undergraduate and postgraduate students.

She has been writing books for over six decades. She has authored many books in biology for public examinations conducted by the Council for the Indian School Certificate Examinations (CISCE), the Central Board of Secondary Education (CBSE), and several state boards. Her books on Cytology, Genetics, Molecular Biology, Biostatistics, Evolutionary Biology, Developmental Biology, Animal Ecology, Environmental Biology (Ecology), etc. are very popular at university level all over the country.

She is the recipient of the Distinguished Author Award 2012 conferred by the Federation of Educational Publishers in India, Delhi.
