= Sanjay Rastogi =

Polymer physicist

Sanjay Rastogi is a polymer physicist and professor of polymer technology in the department of materials at Loughborough University, United Kingdom.
