= Anuja Trehan Kapur =

Indian criminal psychologist (born 1975)

- Born: 24 October 1975 (age 51); Delhi, India
- Education: Bachelor's in psychology; Master's in criminology; LLB in forensic science; Diploma in victimology
- Alma mater: Queen Mary School, Tis Hazari, Delhi University, CCS University
- Occupations: Criminal psychologist, socialist, advocate
- Political party: Bharatiya Janata Party
- Spouse: Amit Kapur
- Children: 2
- Website: www.anujakapur.com

Anuja Trehan Kapur (born 24 October 1975) is an Indian criminal psychologist who is also known as a counselor, social activist and advocate. Editor- Atul Tiwari

== Early life and education ==
Born in Delhi India, in a Punjabi family. She went to Queen Mary School in Tis Hazari, Delhi and later earned a bachelor's degree in psychology and master's degree in criminology from Delhi University.

Kapur later completed another course in forensic science from Department of Anthropology, University of Delhi. She holds an International diploma in victimology from The Tokiawa International Victimology Institute, Japan. She also completed her LLB from CCS University.

== Professional career ==
After graduating from Delhi University, Kapur joined Delhi Public School as a student counselor. Later, she joined CURES NGO as executive director.

Kapur started sharing theories on various high-profile criminal cases such as Indrani Mukerjea case, the Somnath Bharti case, the Asaram Bapu case, the Sunanda Pushkar, the 2008 Noida double murder case (known as the "Aarushi murder" case), the 2012 Delhi gang rape (known as the "Nirbhaya rape case", and the 2014 Badaun gang rape allegations.

As a psychologist she shares input on various psychological and mental issues related to abnormal behavior, suicide, child psychology, divorce, bullying, remarriage and its effects on children, social media and networking, and relationship issues.

Kapur founded a non-governmental organization named Nirbhiya Ek Shakti, which is the Center for Victim Assistance. She spent one day in Sheroes Cafe for the purpose of giving counseling to the victims in Agra. Under the Operation Nirbheek she did counseling for various government students in municipal and private schools on. She also raises her voice for acid attack victims.

Kapur attended the 15th International Symposium, which was organized by WSV, Victim Support Australia, Angelhands and the Australian Institute of Criminology.

In March 2017, Kapur defended the case of a 24-year-old Delhi based model girl and a 16-year-old Nepalese girl who were allegedly raped and then forced into prostitution.

In April 2017, Kapur spoke with India Today Education on different levels of depression and how to tackle them.

== Awards and recognition ==
- Indian Icon Awards by Time India News, 2015
- India Excellence Awards by Time India News, 2016
- 2016 - KAF Business and Entertainment Global Award in the Best Criminal Psychologist category
- 2016 - Best Criminal Psychologist Award at the Women Excellence Achiever's Award (WEAA) held in Jaipur by Harish Soni
- Appointed as the Special Police Officer for Delhi Police, North West Delhi, 2016

== Personal life ==
Kapur resides in Delhi and she is married to Amit Kapur, a businessman from Delhi. They have two sons.
