= Strangeways, Manchester =

Area of inner north Manchester

Coordinates: 53.493°N 2.244°W

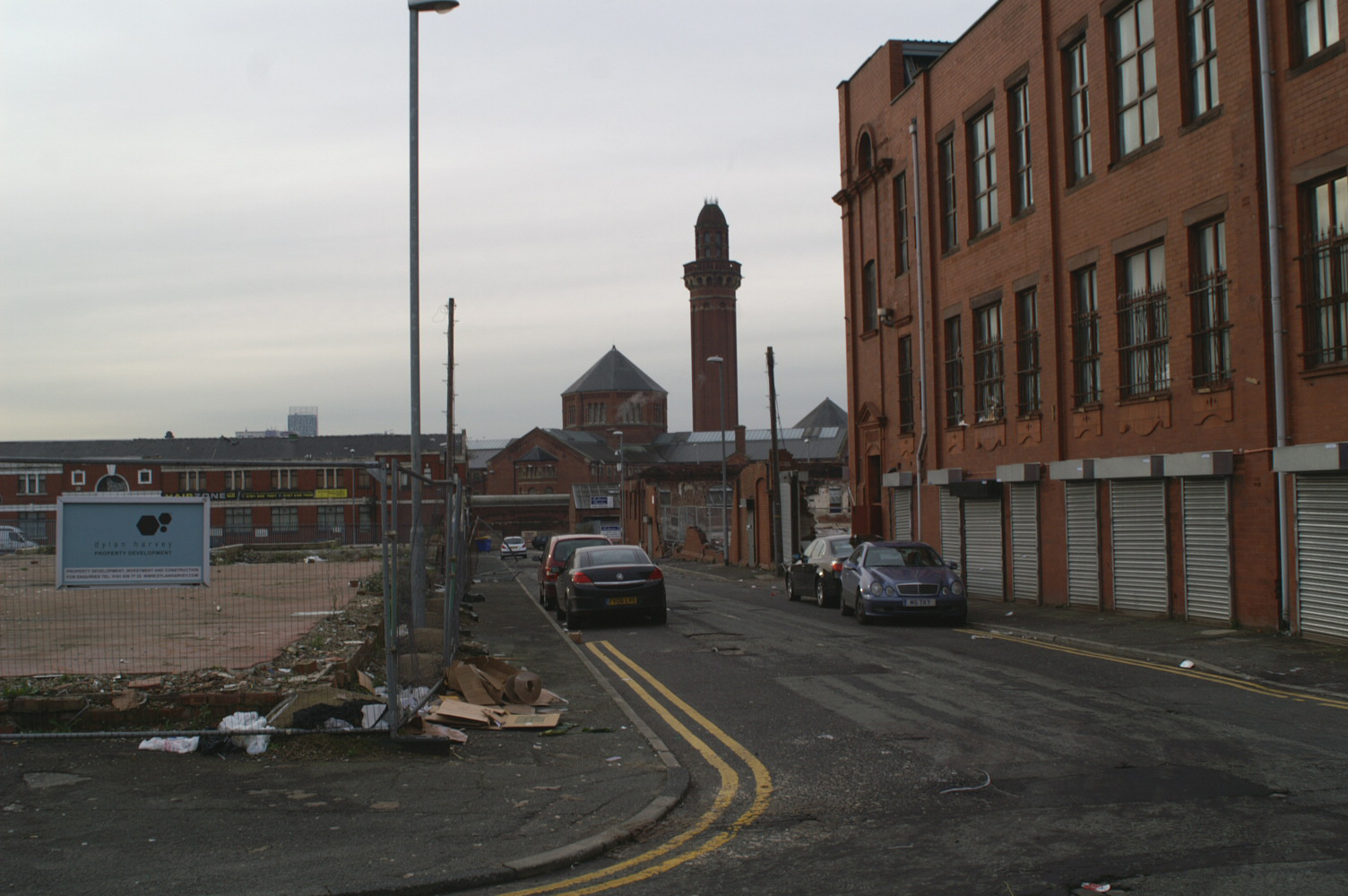
Strangeways Prison, seen from Derby Street, looking down Blacklock Street

Strangeways is an area of inner Manchester, England, located just north of the city centre, around Strangeways Prison.

== Toponymy ==
The name derives from the Old English strang wæsc, meaning "strong flood", presumably because the area, lying between the rivers Irk and Irwell, was subject to frequent inundations. The modern form is due to folk etymology. The gentle Strangways family took its name from the area.

Until the 19th century, Strangeways was a rural village, with Strangeways Hall, Park and Gardens.

== Strangeways Brewery ==
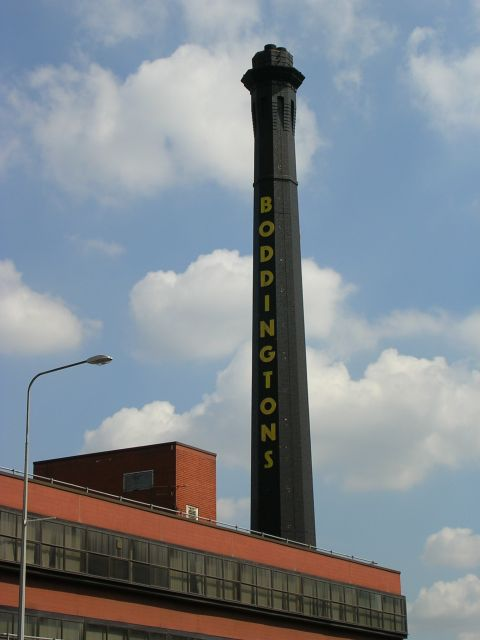
The chimney of Strangeways Brewery in 2005

Strangeways Brewery was famous as the home of Boddingtons Bitter. It closed in 2005 and was demolished in 2007.

== Timeline ==
- 1459: First known mention of the de Strangeways family in the area.
- 1544: A settlement document describes widespread property attached to Strangeways Hall, including 24 houses, 20 town properties, 20 cottages, and various land up to several miles away.
- 1641: Strangeways Hall appears on a map. It was in Elizabethan or Jacobean style.
- 1624: John Hartley (1609–1655) bought Strangeways Hall. His father Nicholas Hartley and elder brother Richard were wool merchants in Manchester.
- Early 18th century: A grey stucco, palladian-style addition to Strangeways Hall was built.
- 1713: The Reynolds family took over the hall.
- 1768: Francis Reynolds granted a lease to Robert Norton to build a house and silk dyeing works by the Hall's fish pond.
- 1777: Strangeways Hall first known to be let to a tenant (Hugh Oldham).
- 1788: Strangeways Hall was run as a girls' boarding school.
- 1816: Start of the area being built over with houses.
- 1838: Land in Strangeways area was sold to the Manchester and Leeds Railway Company; Manchester Victoria station is there now.
- 1858: Strangeways Hall demolished and its materials sold
- 1859: A newspaper report that the Hall was "several times rebuilt".
- 1864: Completion of building of the Assize Courts on the site of Strangeways Hall. (It was destroyed in the 1939–1945 Blitz and its site is now a car park on Great Ducie Street).
- 1868: Strangeways Prison opened. It was built on the site of Strangeways Hall's fish ponds.
- late 19th century: Jewish immigration to the area, fleeing from violence in Russia.
