= Yogendra Rastogi =

Famous calendar art painters, in North India

The Legend Yogendra Rastogi was one of the most famous calendar art painters of North India. He was noted for his paintings of Hindu deities which contributed to the visual mass culture of India. His painting studio is in Meerut. He died at the age of 76 on 29 August 2015.

== Early life ==
Rastogi was a self-taught artist. He was unable to continue his education because of poverty. In the absence of funds to purchase either adequate paint or paper, he developed his painting skills. As the eldest son and in the attempt to feed the family, he started decorating and sign-painting in Meerut, taking whatever work was available.

Since he first painted the boy soldier during the Indo-China war, the famous Nanha Munna Rahi, Rastogi had graduated to owning two printing presses devoted to his work.
