= Paipra =

- Town
- Location in Kerala, India Paipra (India)
- Coordinates: 10°1′30″N 76°33′25″E
- Country: India
- State: Kerala
- District: Ernakulam

Area
  - Total: 23 km^{2} (8.9 sq mi)

Population (2001)
  - Total: 24,000
  - Density: 1,000/km^{2} (2,700/sq mi)

Languages
  - Official: Malayalam, English
- Time zone: UTC+5:30 (IST)
- PIN: 686673
- Telephone code: 91 485
- Vehicle registration: KL-17
- Coastline: 0 kilometres (0 mi)
- Nearest city: Muvattupuzha
- Sex ratio: 1023 ♂/♀
- Literacy: 95%
- Lok Sabha constituency: Idukki
- Climate: Tropical monsoon (Köppen)
- Avg. summer temperature: 35 °C (95 °F)
- Avg. winter temperature: 23 °C (73 °F)

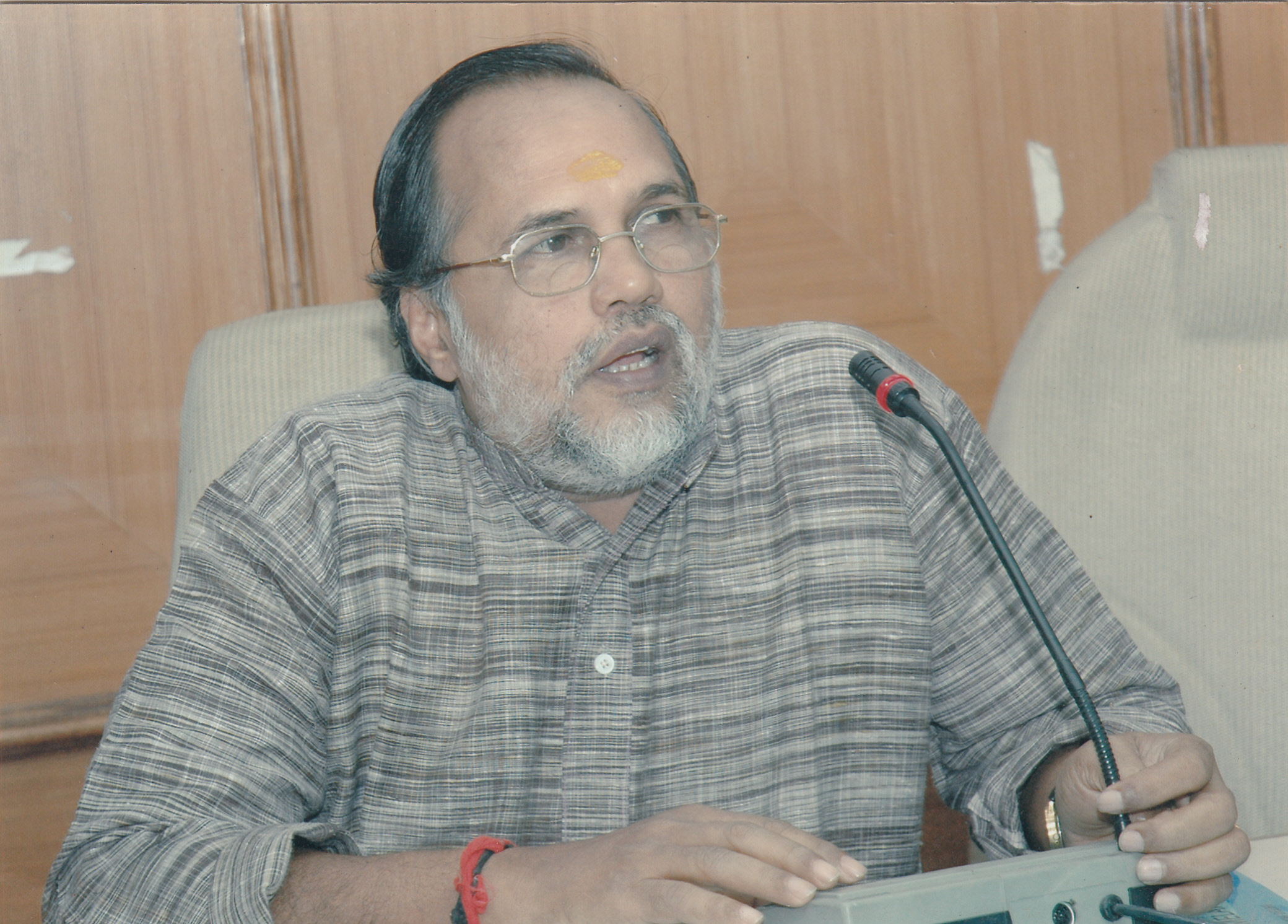
Paipra Radhakrishnan, writer

Paipra (near Pezhakkappilly) is a small village in Muvattupuzha Taluka of Ernakulam district of Kerala state, south India.

== Location ==
Paipra is located at the centre of a triangle formed by four medium-sized towns: Muvattupuzha, Banttaraptzhu Perumbavoor and Kothamangalam.

Paipra is a central point in, and an industrial area of, the growing town of Muvattupuzha. It has a variety of political parties. Its main agricultural activities are pineapple, rubber, and tapioca.
