= Anuj (singer) =

Australian pop singer

- Born: New Delhi, India
- Genres: pop
- Labels: Huge Recording Company

Anuj is an Australian pop singer. He had three top 50 singles on the ARIA singles chart. He is currently a member of Sydney hip hop outfit King Farook sharing lead vocal duties with Antonio Chiappetta.

== Discography ==
=== Albums ===
List of albums, with selected details
Title	Details
Stereo on the Moon	Released: 2001; Format: CD; Label: Huge (MEGA 001)

=== Singles ===
List of singles, with selected chart positions
Title	Year	Peak chart positions	Album
Title	Year	AUS	Album
"Can You Stand the Heat"	2000	44	Stereo on the Moon
"Remember Me"	2000	46	Stereo on the Moon
"What You Wanna Do"	2001	46	Stereo on the Moon
