= Anuj Rastogi =

- Born: 1978 (age 47–48); Canada
- Genres: Electronica, fusion, spoken word, ambient
- Occupations: Music producer, film composer, songwriter, spoken word artist
- Website: www.omnesia.com

Anuj Rastogi (born 1978), is a Toronto, Ontario, Canada based film composer, producer, musician, spoken-word artist, writer and live event producer. He is an active collaborator, and founder of independent music label Omnesia Records.

== Biography ==
=== Early life ===
Rastogi was raised in Edmonton, Alberta, Canada, and later moved to Toronto. Rastogi learned the keyboard and piano as a child, and went on to play the jazz tuba, tenor and soprano saxophones, and percussion throughout primary and secondary/high school. He also developed a working familiarity with a number of other instruments, and began to experiment with composition and arrangement.

Rastogi holds undergraduate degrees from the University of Alberta (BComm) and an MBA from the Schulich School of Business at York University.

=== Career ===
Though having experimented with sound and composition for much of his life, Rastogi began producing music in 2002. In 2003, Rastogi met Ghazal and tabla artist Cassius Khan, and began to bridge traditional and electronic music through their first few collaborations. Since 2003, Rastogi has continued to work with an extensive list of folk, classical, and contemporary artists of several musical styles.

His 2007 debut album Omnesia featured 10 artists, and many styles under one studio project composed and produced by Rastogi. Omnesia received critical and audience acclaim throughout 2007/2008 for its unique blend and vision. Inside Entertainment magazine's Editor's Pick for 2007 stated, "Ambient electronica 'takes chai' with rap, sitar, tabla, saxophone, spoken word and Hindi-pop. This self-titled sonic journey from... Anuj Rastogi ventures excitingly close to AR Rahman territory."

2009's "Dark Matter" showcased a heavier musical aesthetic, winning equal critical praise and new fans in bass-heavy genres.

Rastogi was commissioned in 2012 to score original background music for two feature films, "Under The Same Sun" and "Surkhaab", both scheduled to release in 2013.

=== Performance ===
Since 2003, Rastogi has produced and/or been featured in over 50 live performances as a composer, producer, musician, spoken word artist, visual artist and writer. Highlights include his 2003 production Omnesian Travels"which featured Japanese Taiko drum team with Tabla, Electronica, North/South Indian Dance, Ukrainian Dulcimer, Sitar, Spoken Word and visuals.

Rastogi and co-founder Qasim Virjee (DJ Abdul Smooth) were also co-founders of Toronto's monthly "Dishoom!" series, which featured live progressive acts, including his own ensemble "Omnesia", and DJs.

Rastogi's DJ sets have included an appearance at the 2006 Indian Electronica Festival in London, UK, as well as opening DJ sets as part of the 2008 Luminato Festival club night for Nitin Sawhney.

In 2009, Rastogi produced the live music/visual arrangements for "Omnesia Live!" along with his extended ensemble of 9 artists, including long-time friend and collaborator Cassius Khan as part of the 8th Annual Small World Music Festival. In September 2010, Rastogi was again invited by the Small World Music Society to open for Asian electronica legend, Talvin Singh. In addition to the musical compositions, and arrangements, Rastogi has also created complete visual/video elements for many of these productions.

In an effort to raise awareness and funds and for various social causes through his performance work, Rastogi has also been a supporter of organizations such as the Heart & Stroke Foundation, Faiths Act Canada, and 'Spread The Net'.

Rastogi's studio projects and live music span elements of various styles, including drum and bass, hip-hop, dubstep and other electronica styles, global folk, Hindustani classical, and contemporary South Asian sounds. To date, he has released one studio album titled Omnesia (2007), and a 5-track EP titled Dark Matter (2009), both on Omnesia Records. Rastogi's music has also been featured on global electronica compilations such as Indian Electronica: Volume 001 (2007), and "Nu asian soundZ" (2010).

=== Influences ===
In interviews and articles, Rastogi has cited a number of artists who have been influential on his own work, including A R Rahman, Nitin Sawhney, Talvin Singh, Cassius Khan, Peter Gabriel, Ustad Nusrat Fateh Ali Khan, Hans Zimmer, John Williams, PM Dawn, Ustad Zakir Hussain, Danny Elfman, Jonathan Elias, Michael Brecker, RD Burman, Public Enemy, Dave Matthews, Karsh Kale, Ustad Tari Khan, Pt. Hariprasad Chaurasia, and Miles Davis.

== Albums ==
- Omnesia (2007), Omnesia Records
- Dark Matter (2009), Omnesia Records

== Compilation features ==
- Indian Electronica / Vol 001 (2007), IndianElectronica
- Nu asian SoundZ (2010), HighChai Recordings
- Nu asian SoundZ (India Release) (2011), Universal Music India
- Sage : Volume 1 (2012), Murda Mudra

== Film scores ==
2010

- My Father The Terrorist (Documentary, one cue "Paranoia", Grapepear Productions)

2011

- Moments (Short film, Adam Azimov, Canadian Film Center)
- "Ma Durga" (Short film, Urmi Bardhan, Canadian Film Board)

2012

- Surkhaab (Golden Gate Creations)
- Under The Same Sun (Peace Tree Films)
