= Murder of Anuj Bidve =

2011 murder in the United Kingdom

- Location: Salford
- Date: 26 December 2011; 01:30 (GMT)
- Target: Anuj Bidve
- Attack type: Murder
- Deaths: 1
- Victim: Anuj Bidve
- Perpetrator: Kiaran Stapleton
- Motive: None
- Verdict: Guilty
- Convicted: Kiaran Stapleton

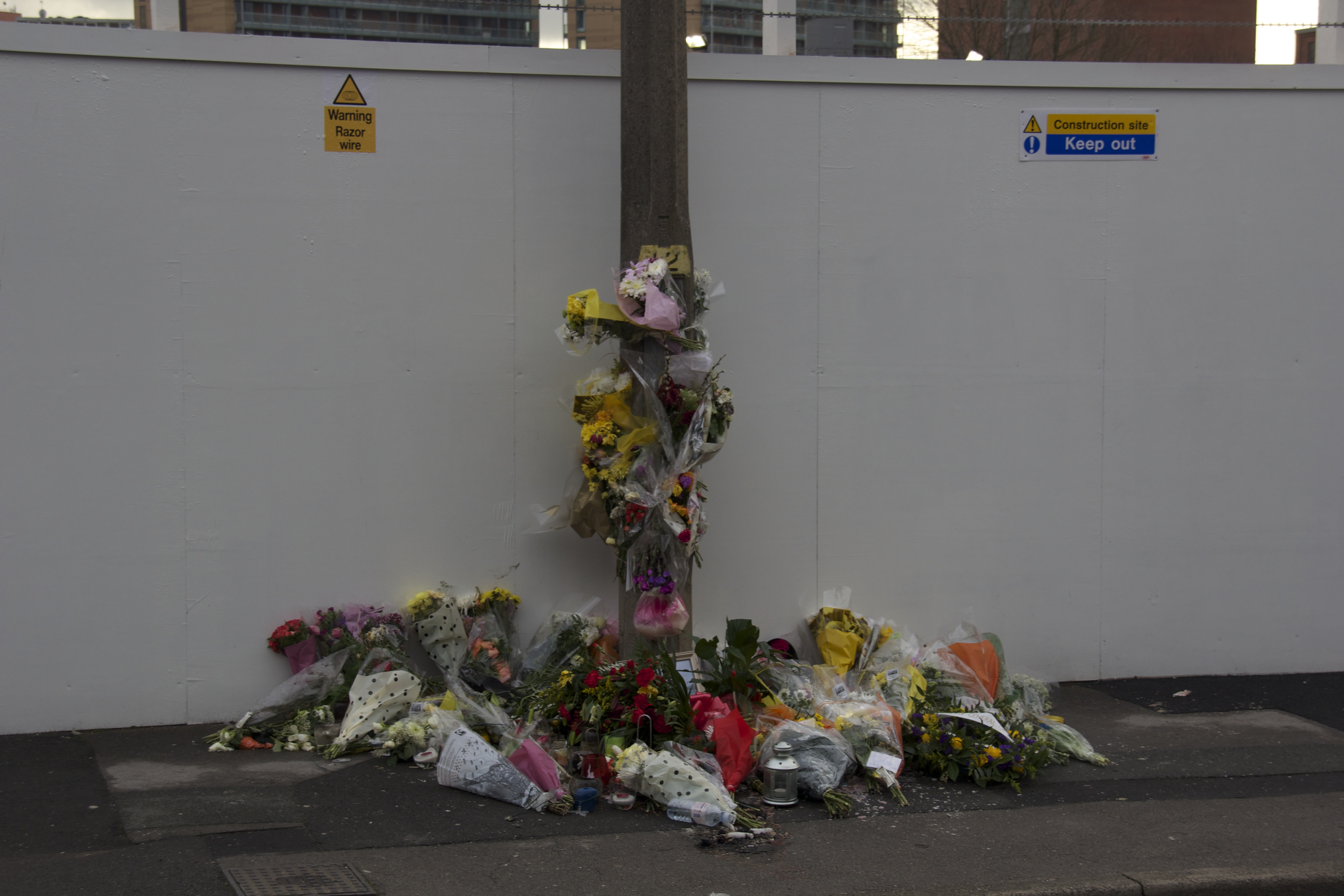
Flowers left in memory of Anuj Bidve at the murder scene

Anuj Bidve was an international student from India who was shot and killed on 26 December 2011, for no apparent reason, while visiting friends in Salford, near Manchester. Local factory worker Kiaran Stapleton was later convicted of his murder. At the time of his death, Bidve was studying for a Master of Science degree in Microelectronics and System-on-Chip Engineering at Lancaster University.

== Investigation ==
The murder was brought to prominence in the UK and abroad due to the execution-style killing, and after the failure of the British police to inform his family in India, who subsequently learned of the death of their 23-year-old son through Facebook. The family complained about this, delays in processing the case and returning the body to them. As a result, the police sent two senior officers to Pune in India to apologise and give them details of the progress of the investigation. Assistant Chief Constable Dawn Copley said: "We felt it was important to make personal contact with the family. We need to explain to them in person where we are up to in the investigation." The family said that they had "complete trust and confidence in Greater Manchester Police".

As of 3 January 2012, five people had been arrested in total. However, three of the group were bailed until March 2012, pending further inquiries. A fourth man, aged 19, who was originally bailed, later had his "bail cancelled", police said, according to the BBC. Previously, on 2 January, the prime suspect had famously announced himself as Kiaran "Psycho" Stapleton during his brief appearance at Manchester City Magistrates' Court. Prosecutor Ben Southam then informed the court that the case had to be sent to Manchester Crown Court, as Stapleton had been charged with murder. Stapleton, of Salford, was remanded in custody. There was no application for bail.

On 26 July 2012, Stapleton was convicted of the murder of Bidve. He was sentenced to life imprisonment, with a minimum of 30 years before parole is considered, which would not be until 27 July 2042. The prosecution and defence at the trial agreed that he had antisocial personality disorder.

== Controversies ==
One notable aspect of the investigation was the trauma suffered by Bidve's father Subhash when he learnt about his son's death via a social networking site, before the police had been able to make contact. He stated that, "the world was finished for us", while laying flowers with his wife Yogini and brother-in-law Rakesh Sonawane at the murder scene. There is still much uncertainty over the motivation for the attack and how it should be treated in law. As of 5 January 2012, the police had not established whether it was a hate crime or part of a gang initiation. Soon after, the British coroner decided to release the body to the Indian consulate, so that arrangements could be made to return it to Pune for the funeral ceremony to take place there.

== Death and reaction ==
Bidve was shot on Ordsall Lane in Ordsall, Greater Manchester at 01:30 GMT on 26 December 2011. He died later in hospital. According to some news reports, more than 400 people paid tribute at a memorial service for him on the night of 2 January 2012 at the scene of the shooting in Salford. The site is less than a mile from the skyscrapers of Manchester city centre and its landmark Beetham Tower.

The Bidve family were accompanied on their visit by dignitaries from the consulate general of India in Birmingham. They were greeted by Chief Superintendent Russ Jackson of Greater Manchester Police, who had previously travelled to India to meet the family, Assistant Chief Constable Dawn Copley, and Barbara Spicer, the chief executive of Salford City Council.

On 5 January, the family met Keith Vaz, chairman of the Parliamentary Home Affairs Select Committee, at Westminster. British Prime Minister David Cameron, who was on a visit to the North West at the time, spoke to the family on the phone, having earlier committed himself to meeting the parents if they so wished.

The Vice-Chancellor of Lancaster University, Professor Mark E. Smith, said the university had provided financial assistance to the family, and would hold a memorial ceremony for Bidve later in the month.
