= Capital punishment in the United Kingdom =

History of the death penalty in the United Kingdom

Europe holds the greatest concentration of abolitionist states (blue). Map current as of 2022 Abolished for all offences Abolished in practice Retains capital punishment

Capital punishment in the United Kingdom predates the initial formation of the United Kingdom in 1707, having been used throughout the British Isles from ancient times until the second half of the 20th century. The last executions in the United Kingdom were by hanging, and took place in 1964; capital punishment for murder in England and Wales and Scotland was suspended in 1965 and finally abolished in 1969 (or 1973 in Northern Ireland). Although unused, the death penalty remained a legally defined punishment for certain offences such as treason until it was completely abolished in 1998; the last person to be executed for treason was William Joyce, in 1946.

In 2004, Protocol No. 13 to the European Convention on Human Rights became binding on the United Kingdom; it prohibits the restoration of the death penalty as long as the UK is a party to the convention (regardless of the UK's status in relation to the European Union).

== Background ==
Prior to the creation of the United Kingdom, execution was used extensively in England. for example, during the reign of Henry VIII, as many as 72,000 people are estimated to have been executed. In Elizabethan England, the death penalty applied for treason, murder, manslaughter, infanticide, rape, arson, grand larceny (theft of goods worth more than a shilling), highway robbery, buggery, sodomy and heresy. Hanging was the method most frequently used for offences other than treason, which was punished by drawing, hanging and quartering for men, burning for women, and beheading for the nobility; and heresy, which was punished by burning. About 24% of those facing trial for such offences were actually executed. About 75% of hangings were for theft.

== History ==
Sir Samuel Romilly, speaking to the House of Commons on capital punishment in 1810, declared that "[there is] no country on the face of the earth in which there [have] been so many different offences according to law to be punished with death as in England". Known as the "Bloody Code", at its height the criminal law included some 220 crimes punishable by death, including "being in the company of Gypsies for one month", "strong evidence of malice in a child aged 7–14 years of age" and "blacking the face or using a disguise whilst committing a crime". Many of these offences had been introduced by the Whig oligarchy to protect the property of the wealthy classes that emerged during the first half of the 18th century, a notable example being the Black Act 1723, which created 50 capital offences for various acts of theft and poaching. Crimes eligible for the death penalty included shoplifting and stealing sheep, cattle, and horses, and before abolition of the death penalty for theft in 1832, "English law was notorious for prescribing the death penalty for a vast range of offences as slight as the theft of goods valued at twelve pence."

Whilst executions for murder, burglary and robbery were common, the death sentences for minor offenders were often not carried out. A sentence of death could be commuted or respited (permanently postponed) for reasons such as benefit of clergy, official pardons, pregnancy of the offender or performance of military or naval duty. The final decision to grant an official full or partial (conditional) pardon to commute the sentence rested with the 'hanging cabinet' (or Grand Cabinet), a senior group of government ministers under the authority of the monarch and directed by the Home Secretary or Prime Minister. The group would assemble in the presence of the reigning monarch and review a list from the Recorder of London of 'Capital Convicts'.

Between 1770 and 1830, an estimated 35,000 death sentences were handed down in England and Wales, of which 7,000 executions were carried out.

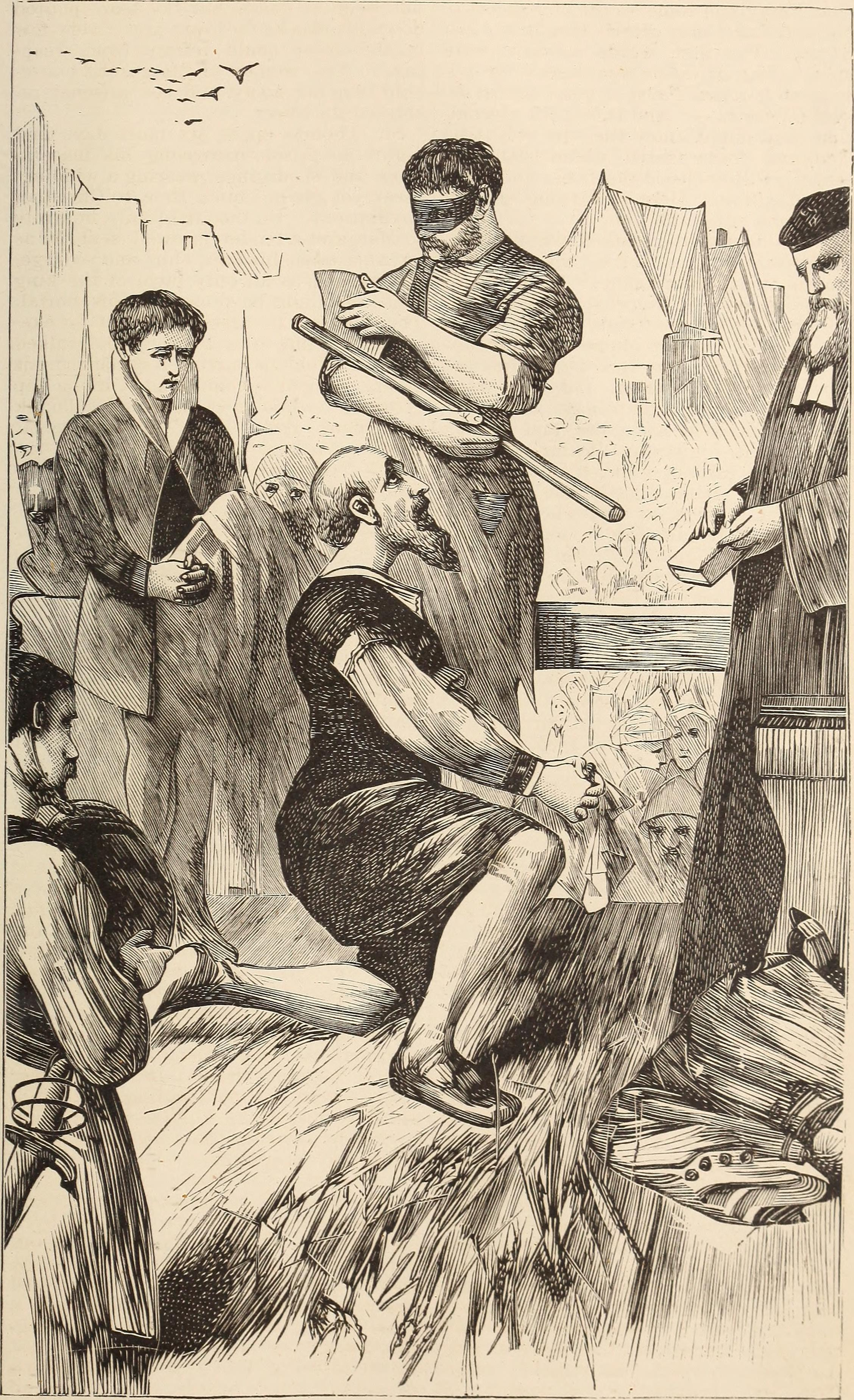
Thomas More, 1535

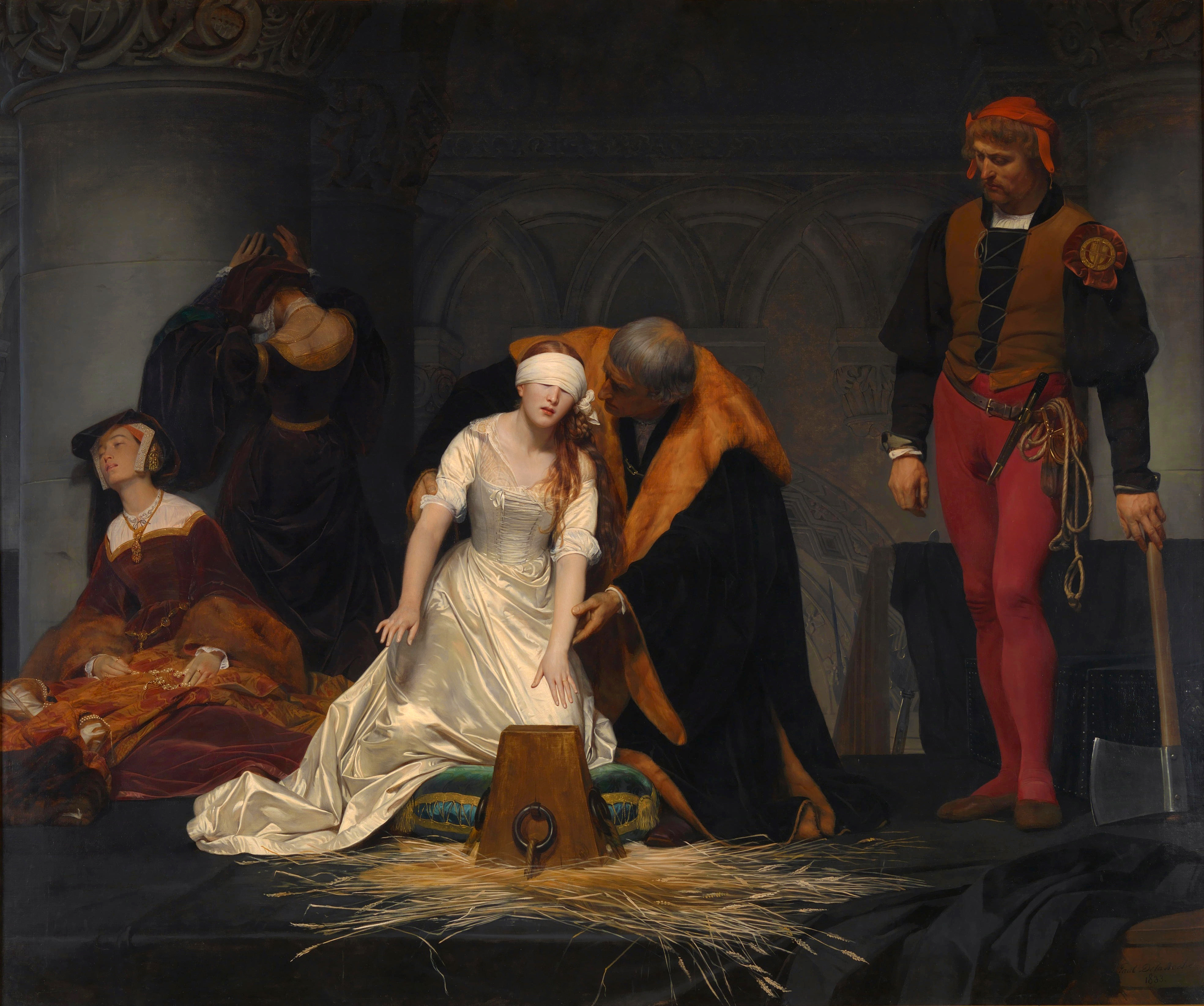
The Execution of Lady Jane Grey in 1554

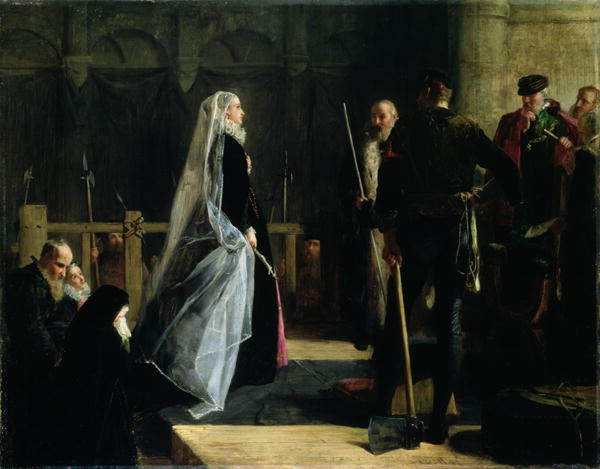
Mary, Queen of Scots in 1587

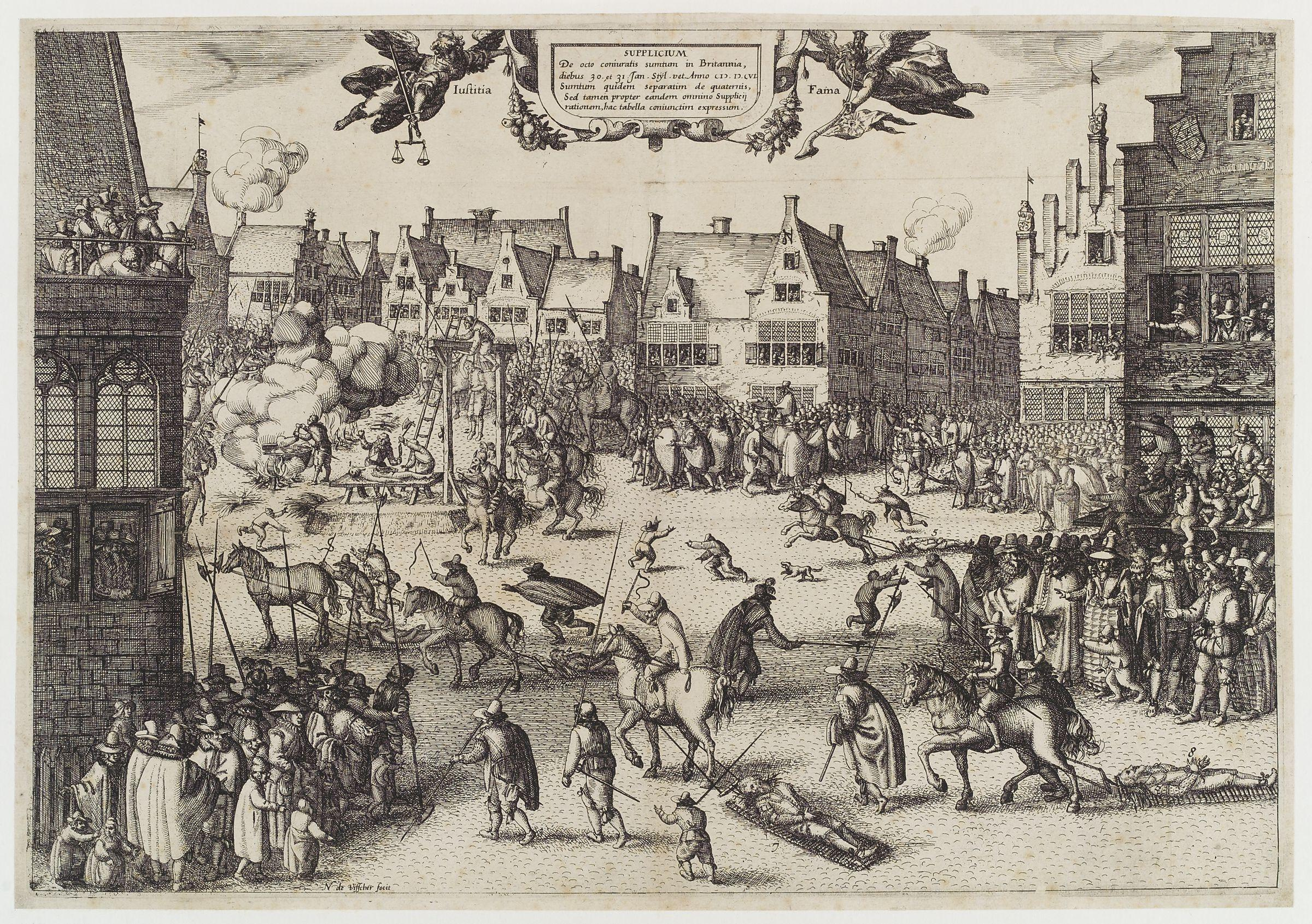
Guy Fawkes, 1606

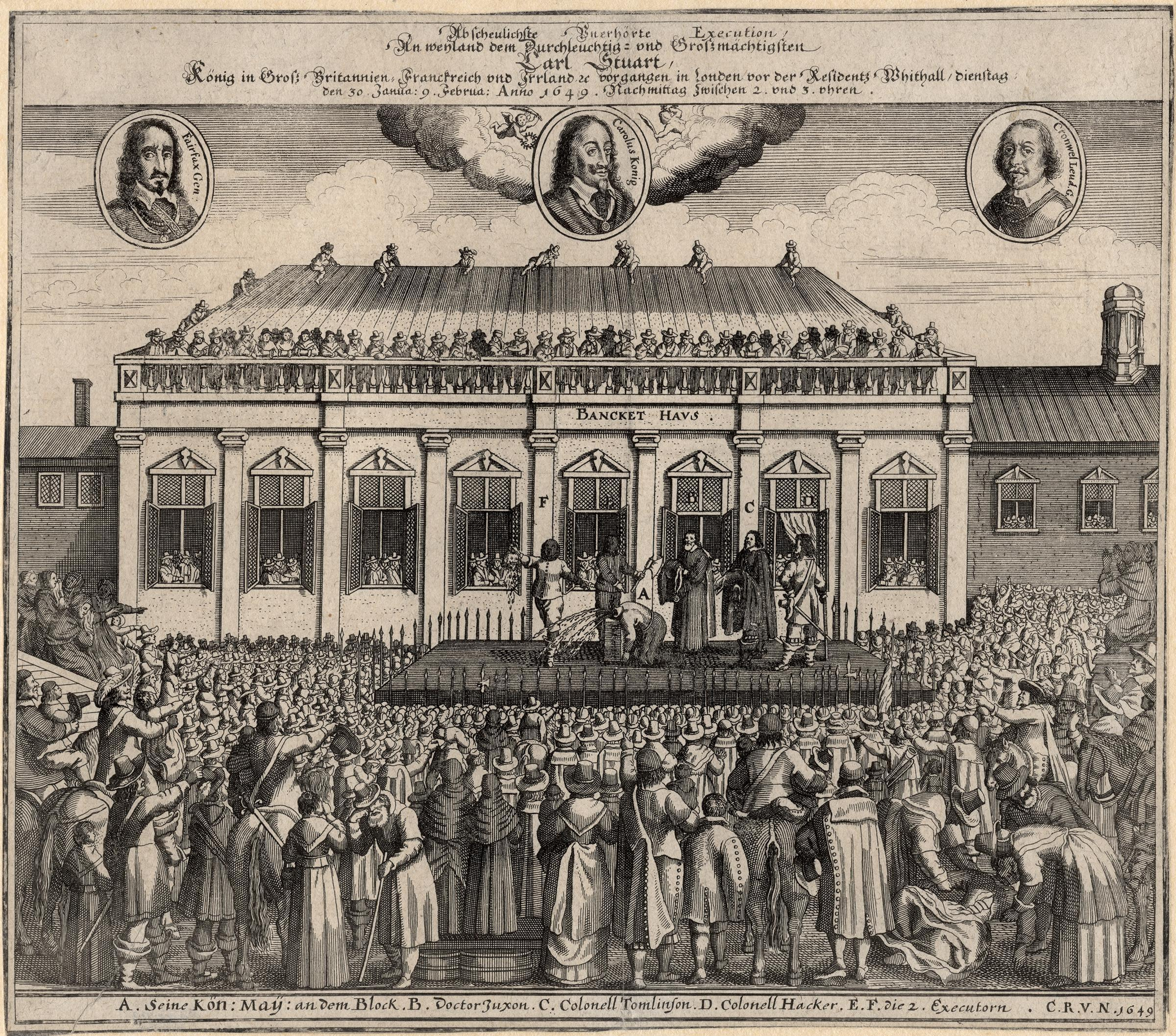
Charles I in 1649

=== 19th century reform ===
In 1808, the lawyer Samuel Romilly KC successfully had the law changed to remove the death penalty for pickpockets and lesser offenders, starting a process of reform that continued over the next 50 years. The death penalty was mandatory (although it was frequently commuted by the government) until the Judgement of Death Act 1823 (4 Geo. 4 c. 48) gave judges the official power to commute the death penalty except for treason and murder. The Punishment of Death, etc. Act 1832 (2 & 3 Will. 4 c. 62) reduced the number of capital crimes by two-thirds. The same year, the death penalty was also abolished for theft, counterfeiting, and forgery, except for the forgery of wills and certain powers of attorney, The meeting of the 'hanging cabinet' (or grand cabinet) which decided on the application of mercy was criticised for its irregular meeting and lack of formal procedure. Under George IV, cartoons satirised how the King favoured decisions over his personal wardrobe ahead of decisions on the life and death of prisoners.

Gibbeting was abolished in 1832 and hanging in chains was abolished in 1834. In 1837, the death penalty for forging wills and powers of attorney was abolished. The death penalty for rape and some other offences was abolished by the Substitution of Punishments of Death Act in 1841. In 1861, several acts of Parliament (24 & 25 Vict. c. 94 to c. 100) further reduced the number of civilian capital crimes in England and Wales to five: murder, treason, espionage, arson in royal dockyards, and piracy with violence; there were other offences under military law. The 1866 report of the Royal Commission on Capital Punishment noted further obsolete capital offences in Scots law which had not yet been formally repealed. The death penalty remained mandatory for treason and murder unless commuted by the monarch.

The 1866 royal commissioners concluded (with dissenters) that there was not a case for abolition but recommended an end to public executions. This proposal was included in the Capital Punishment Amendment Act 1868. From that date executions in Great Britain were carried out only in prisons. The punishment of beheading and quartering those executed for treason was abolished in 1870. The last application of that punishment had been in 1820 and the last sentence to the punishment had been in 1839.

The Criminal Procedure (Scotland) Act 1887 abolished the death penalty in Scots law for crimes other than murder, "treason or rebellion against the Sovereign", and (in theory but not in practice) certain types of attempted murder. Relevant offences, which were obsolete or for which lesser punishments had long applied in practice, included theft furtum grave; robbery or stouthrief; piracy; breaking into houses or ships; destroying ships; fire raising; certain classes of malicious mischief; beating and cursing parents; hamesucken; aggravated rape; abduction; returning to Scotland after banishment for performing a marriage without banns; incest; sodomy; and bestiality.

=== 20th century ===
In 1902, the tradition of raising a black flag over the prison where a death sentence was carried out, was replaced with a notice published on the prison gates due to poor behaviour from members of the public. In 1908, the Children Act 1908 banned the execution of juveniles under the age of 16. In 1922, a new offence of infanticide was introduced to replace the charge of murder for mothers killing their children in the first year of life. In 1930, a parliamentary select committee recommended that capital punishment be suspended for a trial period of five years, but no action was taken. From 1931, pregnant women could no longer be hanged (following the birth of their child) although, in practice, since the 18th century their sentences had always been commuted.

In 1933, the minimum age for capital punishment was raised to 18 under the Children and Young Persons Act 1933. The last known execution by the civilian courts of a person under 18 was that of Charles Dobell, 17, hanged at Maidstone together with his accomplice William Gower, 18, in January 1889. Harold Wilkins, at 16 years old, was the last juvenile sentenced to the death penalty in the United Kingdom, in 1932 for a sexually related murder, but he was reprieved due to age.

In 1938, the issue of the abolition of capital punishment was brought before parliament. A clause within the Criminal Justice Bill called for an experimental five-year suspension of the death penalty. When war broke out in 1939 the bill was postponed. It was revived after the war in 1948 and was adopted by a majority in the House of Commons (245 to 222). In the House of Lords, the abolition clause was defeated but the remainder of the bill was passed as the Criminal Justice Act 1948. Popular support for abolition was absent and the government decided that it would be inappropriate for it to assert its supremacy by invoking the Parliament Act 1911 over such an unpopular issue.

==== Second World War ====
In 1940, three new capital offences were created by emergency legislation:

1. Treachery,
2. "Forcing a safeguard", and
3. Looting.

Treachery consisted of helping the enemy, and was created by the Treachery Act 1940. Forcing a safeguard was an offence under regulation 1B of the Defence (General) Regulations 1939; a safeguard meant any member of the British armed forces posted for the purpose of protecting any place or regulating traffic. Looting in an area which had been attacked by the enemy, or which had been designated by a minister, was an offence under regulation 38A. The only penalty for treachery was death; the other two offences were punishable by either death or penal servitude for life or for any term. These latter two offences were described in a 1943 law textbook as "anomalies" in the criminal law, since they were not felonies but were still capital crimes, the court of quarter sessions could impose a death sentence (which it ordinarily could not do), and because "It is also entirely novel, in modern times at least, to impose a discretionary death penalty. In all other capital crimes the judge is protected from the responsibility of deciding whether the particular crime merits death by the fact that the sentence is fixed by law."

All three offences were abolished after the war.

==== Postwar ====
In 1948 the Home Secretary, James Chuter Ede, instead set up a new royal commission (the Royal Commission on Capital Punishment, 1949–1953) with instructions to determine "whether the liability to suffer capital punishment should be limited or modified". The commission's report discussed a number of alternatives to execution by hanging (including the electric chair, gas inhalation, lethal injection, shooting, and the guillotine), but rejected them. It had more difficulty with the principle of capital punishment. Popular opinion believed that the death penalty acted as a deterrent to criminals, but the statistics within the report were inconclusive. The commission concluded that unless there was overwhelming public support in favour of abolition, the death penalty should be retained.

Whilst the report recommended abolition from an ethical standpoint, it made no mention of possible miscarriages of justice. The public had by then expressed dissatisfaction with the verdict in the case of Timothy Evans, who was tried and hanged in 1950 for murdering his infant daughter. It later transpired in 1953 that John Christie had strangled at least six women in the same house; he also confessed to killing Evans's wife. If the jury in his trial had known this, Evans might have been acquitted. There were other cases in the same period where doubts arose over convictions and subsequent hangings, such as the notorious case of Derek Bentley.

Between 1900 and 1949, 621 men and 11 women were executed in England and Wales. Ten German agents were executed during the First World War under the Defence of the Realm Act 1914, and 16 spies were executed during the Second World War under the Treachery Act 1940.

Whereas the 1866 Naval Discipline Act made "All spies for the enemy" subject to death, the Naval Discipline Act 1957 only made spying capital for non-naval personnel if it occurred on naval ships or bases. (The Official Secrets Act 1911 had created a separate non-capital spying offence.)

By 1957, a number of controversial cases highlighted the issue of capital punishment again. Campaigners for abolition were partially rewarded with the Homicide Act 1957. The Act brought in a distinction between capital and non-capital murder.

===== Homicide Act 1957 offences punishable by death =====
Only six categories of murder were punishable by execution:

- in the course or furtherance of theft
- by shooting or causing an explosion
- while resisting arrest or during an escape
- of a police officer
- of a prison officer by a prisoner
- the second of two murders committed on different occasions (if both done in Great Britain).

The police and the government were of the opinion that the death penalty deterred offenders from carrying firearms and it was for this reason that such offences remained punishable by death.

==== Free votes ====
The 1957 act was the last time a three-line whip was imposed in Parliament on the death penalty. Apart from the 1948 Commons decision to accede to the Lords' amendment, all other votes from the 1939 suspension bill to the 1994 reintroduction motion have been free votes with the issue regarded as a matter of conscience. These have been instigated by a backbencher (by motion or private member's bill) rather than on behalf of the Government or the official Opposition. Some commentators see this conscience treatment as a way for political parties to insulate themselves from a backlash over an issue on which their leadership's support for abolition differed from public support for the death penalty.

== Abolition ==
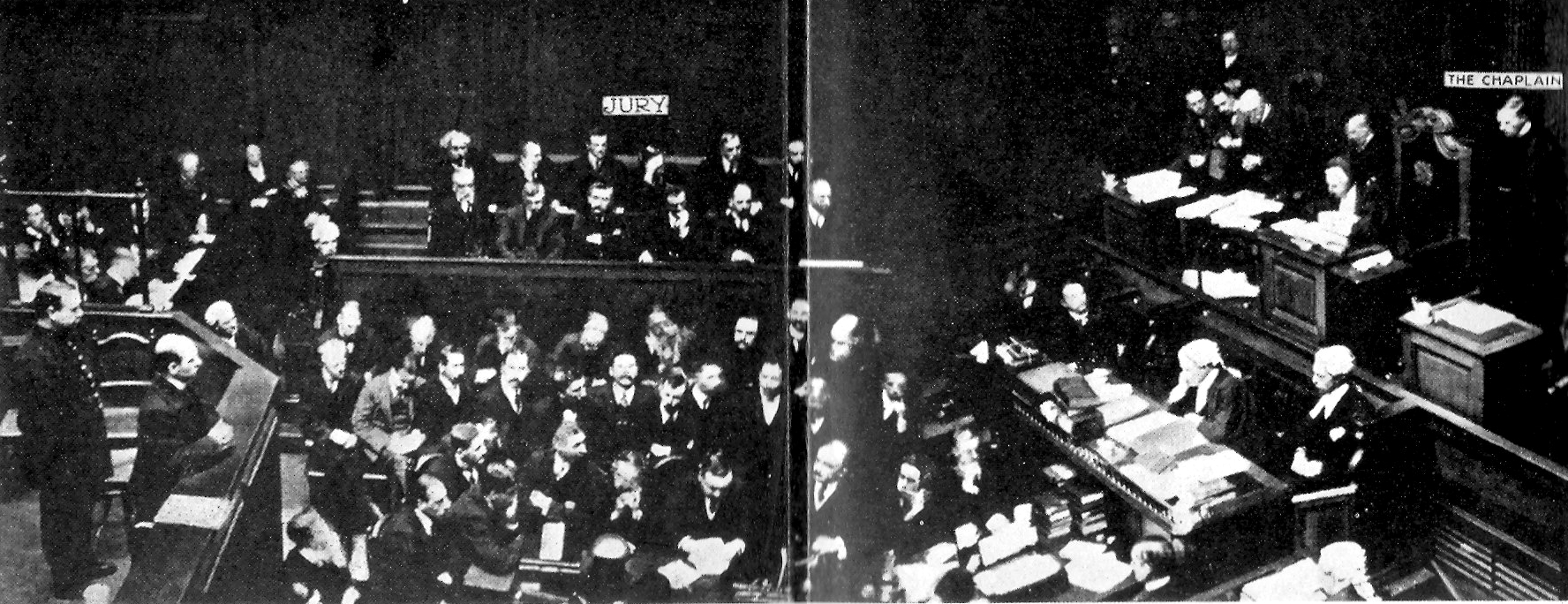
The only known photograph of the death sentence being pronounced in England and Wales, for the poisoner Frederick Seddon in 1912

In 1965, the Labour MP Sydney Silverman, who had committed himself to the cause of abolition for longer than 20 years, introduced a Private Member's Bill to suspend the death penalty for murder. It was passed on a free vote in the House of Commons by 200 votes to 98. The bill was subsequently passed by the House of Lords by 204 votes to 104. Silverman was opposed in the 1966 general election in the Nelson and Colne constituency by Patrick Downey, the uncle of Lesley Anne Downey, a victim in the Moors murders case, who stood on an explicitly pro-hanging platform. Downey polled over 5,000 votes, 13.7%, then the largest vote for a genuinely independent candidate since 1945.

The Murder (Abolition of Death Penalty) Act 1965 suspended the death penalty in Great Britain (but not in Northern Ireland) for murder for a period of five years, and substituted a mandatory sentence of life imprisonment; it further provided that if, before the expiry of the five-year suspension, each House of Parliament passed a resolution to make the effect of the Act permanent, then it would become permanent. In 1969, the Home Secretary, James Callaghan, proposed a motion to make the Act permanent, which was carried in the Commons on 16 December 1969, and a similar motion was carried in the Lords on 18 December. The death penalty for murder was abolished in Northern Ireland on 25 July 1973 under the Northern Ireland (Emergency Provisions) Act 1973.

Following the abolition of the death penalty for murder, the House of Commons held a vote during each subsequent parliament until 1997 to restore the death penalty. This motion was always defeated, but the death penalty remained for other crimes until the dates mentioned below:

1. causing a fire or explosion in a naval dockyard, ship, magazine or warehouse (until the Criminal Damage Act 1971);
2. spying in ships of the Royal Navy, or its establishments abroad (until the Armed Forces Act 1981);
3. piracy with violence (until the Crime and Disorder Act 1998);
4. treason (until the Crime and Disorder Act 1998);
5. certain purely military offences under the jurisdiction of the armed forces. The last applicable offences (until the Human Rights Act 1998) were:
  1. serious misconduct in action;
  2. assisting the enemy;
  3. obstructing operations;
  4. giving false air signals;
  5. mutiny or incitement to mutiny; and
  6. failure to suppress a mutiny with intent to assist the enemy.

However, no executions were carried out in the United Kingdom for any of these offences after the abolition of the death penalty for murder.

Nevertheless, there remained a working gallows at HMP Wandsworth, London, until 1994, which was tested every six months until 1992. This gallows is now housed in the National Justice Museum in Nottingham.

=== Last executions ===
England and in the United Kingdom: on 13 August 1964, Peter Anthony Allen, at Walton Prison in Liverpool, and Gwynne Owen Evans, at Strangeways Prison in Manchester, were executed for the murder of John Alan West on 7 April that year.

In 1955, Ruth Ellis was the last woman to be hanged in Britain; for the murder of her lover David Blakely.

Scotland: Henry John Burnett, 21, on 15 August 1963 in Craiginches Prison, Aberdeen, for the murder of seaman Thomas Guyan.

Northern Ireland: Robert McGladdery, 26, on 20 December 1961 in Crumlin Road Gaol, Belfast, for the murder of Pearl Gamble.

Wales: Vivian Teed, 24, in HMP Swansea on 6 May 1958, for the murder of William Williams, sub-postmaster of Fforestfach Post Office.

=== Last death sentences ===
Northern Ireland: Liam Holden in 1973 in Northern Ireland, for the capital murder of a British soldier during the Troubles. Holden was removed from the death cell in May 1973. In 2012, his conviction was quashed on appeal on the grounds that his confession was obtained by torture.

England: David Chapman, who was sentenced to hang in November 1965 for the murder of a swimming pool nightwatchman in Scarborough. He was released from prison in 1979 and later died in a car accident.

Scotland: Patrick McCarron in 1964 for shooting his wife. He killed himself in prison in 1970.

Wales: Edgar Black, who was reprieved on 6 November 1963. He had shot his wife's lover in Cardiff.

=== Final abolition ===
The Criminal Damage Act 1971 abolished the offence of arson in royal dockyards.

The Armed Forces Act 1981 abolished the death penalty for the civilian offence of spying in navy ships or bases which had been created by the Naval Discipline Act 1957.

Beheading was abolished as a method of execution for treason in 1973. Hanging, however, remained available until 30 September 1998 when, under a House of Lords amendment to the Crime and Disorder Act 1998, proposed by Lord Archer of Sandwell, the death penalty was abolished for treason and piracy with violence, replacing it with a discretionary maximum sentence of life imprisonment. These were the last civilian offences punishable by death.

On 20 May 1998, the House of Commons voted to ratify the 6th Protocol of the European Convention on Human Rights prohibiting capital punishment except "in time of war or imminent threat of war". The last remaining provisions for the death penalty under military jurisdiction (including in wartime) were removed when section 21(5) of the Human Rights Act 1998 came into force on 9 November 1998. On 10 October 2003, effective from 1 February 2004, the UK acceded to the 13th Protocol, which prohibits the death penalty in all circumstances.

As members of The Commonwealth, several states in the West Indies still had the British Judicial Committee of the Privy Council as the court of final appeal; although the death penalty has been retained in these states, the Privy Council would sometimes delay or deny executions. Some of these states severed links with the British court system in 2001 by transferring the responsibilities of the Privy Council to the Caribbean Court of Justice, to speed up executions.

=== Crown dependencies ===
Although not part of the United Kingdom, the Isle of Man and the bailiwicks of Guernsey and Jersey are British Crown dependencies.

In the Channel Islands, the last death sentence was passed in 1984; the last execution in the Channel Islands was in Jersey on 9 October 1959, when Francis Joseph Huchet was hanged for murder. The Human Rights (Amendment) (Jersey) Order 2006 amends the Human Rights (Jersey) Law 2000 to give effect to the 13th Protocol of the European Convention on Human Rights providing for the total abolition of the death penalty. Both of these laws came into effect on 10 December 2006. Capital punishment was abolished in Guernsey in 2003, and the 13th Protocol was extended to Guernsey in April 2004. Sark (which is part of Guernsey but has its own laws) formally retained it until January 2004, when the Chief Pleas in a 14–9 vote removed it from the statutes.

The last execution on the Isle of Man took place in 1872, when John Kewish was hanged for patricide. Capital punishment was not formally abolished by Tynwald (the island's parliament) until 1993. Five persons were sentenced to death (for murder) on the Isle of Man between 1973 and 1992, although all sentences were commuted to life imprisonment. The last person to be sentenced to death in the UK or its dependencies was Anthony Teare, who was convicted at the Manx Court of General Gaol Delivery in Douglas for contract murder in 1992; he was subsequently retried and sentenced to life imprisonment in 1994. In 2004, the 13th Protocol was adopted, with an effective date of 1 November 2006.

=== Overseas territories ===
Like the Crown dependencies, the British overseas territories are constitutionally not part of the United Kingdom. However, the British government's ultimate responsibility for good governance of the territories has led it over recent years to pursue a policy of revoking all statutory provision for the death penalty in those territories where it had up until recently been legal.

The last executions in an overseas territory, and indeed the last on British soil, took place in Bermuda in 1977, when two men, Larry Tacklyn and Erskine Burrows, were hanged for the 1973 murder of the territory's then governor, Sir Richard Sharples. In a 1990 referendum with a 33% turnout, 79% of Bermudian voters opted to retain the death penalty.

In 1991, the British government passed an Order in Council, the Caribbean Territories (Abolition of Death Penalty for Murder) Order 1991, which abolished capital punishment for murder in Anguilla, the British Virgin Islands, the Cayman Islands, Montserrat and the Turks and Caicos Islands.

The British government was unable to extend the abolition via Order in Council to Bermuda, the UK's most autonomous overseas territory with powers of almost total self-governance—but warned that if voluntary abolition was not forthcoming it would be forced to consider the unprecedented step of "whether to impose abolition by means of an Act of Parliament". As a result, the Bermudian government introduced its own domestic legislation in 1999 to rectify the problem.

Further measures were subsequently adopted to revoke technicalities in British overseas territories' domestic legislation as regards use of the death penalty for crimes of treason and piracy. In October 2002 the British government abolished the death penalty for treason and piracy in the Turks and Caicos Islands. Since then, the death penalty has been outlawed under all circumstances in all the UK's overseas territories.

== Policy regarding foreign capital punishment ==
Under section 94 of the Extradition Act 2003, it is unlawful for an extradition of an individual to take place if the individual is accused of a capital crime, unless the Home Secretary has received assurances that the death penalty would not be applied in that case. Regardless of this, in July 2018, the Government said it would not object to the United States seeking the death penalty for two suspected British members of the Islamic State captured by the Syrian Democratic Forces. Although not strictly an extradition case, in response to an urgent question in Parliament on the matter, the Government stated that they still held the policy "to oppose the death penalty in all circumstances as a matter of principle".

== Public support for reintroduction of capital punishment ==
Since the death penalty's suspension in 1965, there have been continued public and media calls for its reintroduction, particularly prompted by high-profile murder cases.

At the same time, there have been a number of miscarriages of justice since 1965 where persons convicted of murder have later had their convictions quashed on appeal and been released from prison, strengthening the argument of those who oppose the death penalty's reintroduction. These include the Birmingham Six (cleared in 1991 of planting an IRA bomb which killed 21 people in 1974), the Guildford Four (cleared in 1989 of murdering five people in another 1974 IRA bombing), Stephen Downing (a Derbyshire man who was freed in 2001 after serving 27 years for the murder of a woman in a churchyard) and Barry George (who was freed in 2007 when his conviction for the 1999 murder of TV presenter Jill Dando was quashed on appeal).

Perhaps the first high-profile murder case which sparked widespread calls for a return of the death penalty was the Moors murders trial in 1966, the year after the death penalty's suspension, in which Ian Brady and Myra Hindley were sentenced to life imprisonment for the murders of two children and a teenager in the Manchester area (they later confessed to a further two murders). Later in 1966, the murder of three policemen in West London also attracted widespread public support for the death penalty's return. Other subsequent high-profile cases to have sparked widespread media and public calls for the death penalty's return include "Yorkshire Ripper" Peter Sutcliffe, convicted in 1981 of murdering 13 women and attacking seven others in the north of England; Roy Whiting, who murdered a seven-year-old girl in West Sussex in 2000; and Ian Huntley, a Cambridgeshire school caretaker who killed two 10-year-old girls in 2002.

A November 2009 television survey showed that 70% favoured reinstating the death penalty for at least one of the following crimes: armed robbery, rape, crimes related to paedophilia, terrorism, adult murder, child murder, child rape, treason, child abuse or kidnapping. However, respondents only favoured capital punishment for adult murder, the polling question asked by other organisations such as Gallup, by small majorities or pluralities: overall, 51% favoured the death penalty for adult murder, while 56% in Wales did, 55% in Scotland, and only 49% in England.

In August 2011, the Internet blogger Paul Staines—who writes the political blog Guido Fawkes and heads the Restore Justice Campaign—launched an e-petition on the Downing Street website calling for the restoration of the death penalty for those convicted of the murder of children and police officers. The petition was one of several in support or opposition of capital punishment to be published by the government with the launch of its e-petitions website. Petitions attracting 100,000 signatures would prompt a parliamentary debate on a particular topic, but not necessarily lead to any Parliamentary Bills being put forward. When the petition closed on 4 February 2012 it had received 26,351 signatures in support of restoring capital punishment, but a counter-petition calling to retain the ban on capital punishment received 33,455 signatures during the same time period.

Also in August 2011, a representative survey conducted by Angus Reid Public Opinion showed that 65% of Britons support reinstating the death penalty for murder in Great Britain, while 28% oppose this course of action. Men and respondents aged over 35 are more likely to endorse the change.

In March 2015, a survey by the NatCen British Social Attitudes Report showed that public support for the death penalty had dropped to 48%.

In April 2021, a poll found that 54% of Britons said they would support reinstating the death penalty for those convicted of terrorism in the UK. About a quarter (23%) of respondents said they would be opposed.

=== Parliamentary debates on reintroduction ===
After Royal Assent for the Murder (Abolition of Death Penalty) Act 1965, supporters in Parliament have made several attempts to reintroduce capital punishment. On 23 November 1966, Duncan Sandys was refused leave to bring in a Bill to restore capital punishment for the murder of police or prison officers, by a vote of 170 to 292. Motions to make the five-year suspension of capital punishment under the 1965 Act permanent were opposed, but agreed by 343 to 185 in the House of Commons; in the House of Lords, an amendment to continue with a temporary suspension of capital punishment until 31 July 1973 was rejected by 174 to 220. In April 1973, the House of Commons voted against reintroduction.

The deaths of civilians in several IRA bombings in 1974 prompted a renewed debate. On 11 December 1974, Brian Walden moved a motion declaring that "the death penalty would neither deter terrorists nor increase the safety of the public"; Jill Knight moved an amendment calling instead for introduction of legislation providing for death to be the penalty for acts of terrorism causing death. Her amendment was rejected by 217 to 369. A year later, Ivan Lawrence's motion "That this House demands capital punishment for terrorist offences causing death" was rejected by 232 to 361.

"I, personally, have always voted for the death penalty, because I believe that people who go out prepared to take the lives of other people forfeit their own right to live. I believe that that death penalty should be used only rarely. But I believe that no one should go out certain that, no matter how cruel, how vicious, how hideous their murder, they themselves will not suffer the death penalty."

— Margaret Thatcher, interview with 'Aplus4', 15 October 1984

After the Conservatives' victory in the 1979 general election, Eldon Griffiths (Parliamentary adviser to the Police Federation of England and Wales) moved a motion "that the sentence of capital punishment should again be available to the courts" on 19 July 1979. While the motion was not expected to pass, the margin of its defeat (243 to 362) was much wider than expected. Later in the same Parliament, the Criminal Justice Bill provided an opportunity on 11 May 1982 for several new clauses to be proposed which would have reinstated capital punishment. The first, which simply declared that "A person convicted of murder shall be liable to capital punishment", was tabled by Edward Gardner, and rejected by 195 to 357. It was followed by an alternative under which capital punishment would be available "as the penalty for an act of terrorism involving the loss of human life"; this new clause was rejected by 176 to 332. A further new clause proposing capital punishment "as the penalty for murder by means of firearms or explosives" was rejected by 176 to 343. Then a new clause allowing for capital punishment "as the penalty for murder of a police or prison officer" was rejected by 208 to 332. Finally, a new clause allowing capital punishment "as the penalty for murder in the course of robbery and burglary which involves the use of offensive weapons" was rejected by 151 to 331.

The new Parliament in 1983 again prompted supporters of capital punishment to put their case. Sir Edward Gardner's motion "That this House favours the restoration of the death penalty for murder" was debated on 13 July 1983, with several amendments moved to restrict capital punishment to certain categories of murder. The amendments were voted on first: capital punishment for murder "resulting from acts of terrorism" was rejected by 245 to 361, for murder "of a police officer during the course of his duties" by 263 to 344, for murder "of a prison officer during the course of his duties" by 252 to 348, for murder "by shooting or causing an explosion" by 204 to 374, and for murder "in the course or furtherance of theft" by 194 to 369. The main motion was then defeated by 223 to 368. Towards the end of the Parliament, a new clause proposed to the Criminal Justice Bill proposed to return the death penalty for "A person convicted by the unanimous verdict of a jury of the premeditated killing of another person or of knowingly and intentionally killing another person in a manner, or for a reason, or in circumstances which a reasonable person would consider to be evil" was rejected by 230 to 342 on 1 April 1987.

The Criminal Justice Bill in 1988 provided a further opportunity for a debate; the new clause proposed by Roger Gale allowed for the jury in a murder case to "have the power, upon reaching a verdict of guilt of murder, to recommend ... death in the manner authorised by law". It was rejected by 218 to 341.

The aforementioned bills were rejected despite support from then Prime Minister Margaret Thatcher.

On 17 December 1990, a new Criminal Justice Bill again saw amendments designed to reintroduce capital punishment. The first covered anyone over 18 "convicted of the murder of a police officer acting in the execution of his duty" and was rejected by 215 to 350; a general reintroduction of death as the penalty for murder (with special provision for the Court of Appeal to decide whether to substitute a life sentence) was then rejected by 182 to 367. Capital punishment for "murder committed by means of firearms, explosives or an offensive weapon, or for the murder of a police or prison officer" was rejected by 186 to 349.

A Parliamentary debate on a question proposing reintroduction of capital punishment came on 21 February 1994 when new clauses to the Criminal Justice and Public Order Bill were moved. The first, providing for death as the sentence for "the murder of a police officer acting in the execution of his duty", was rejected by 186 to 383; a new clause providing for general reintroduction with power for the Court of Appeal to substitute life imprisonment was rejected by 159 to 403. This would have been aimed at terrorists in the Northern Ireland conflict.

In June 2013, a new bill for capital punishment in England and Wales was introduced, sponsored by Conservative MP Philip Hollobone. This bill was withdrawn.

=== Parties in support ===
The British Democrats, Britain First, UK Independence Party (UKIP) and Restore Britain have policies for a referendum on the reintroduction of the death penalty in the UK. Additionally, Some members of the right wing parties the Conservatives and Reform UK including Reform UK Chairman Lee Anderson have also spoken in favour of a referendum.

== Notable executions ==
=== Before 1707 ===
- 23 August 1305: Sir William Wallace, hanged, drawn and quartered on charges of treason despite famously arguing that he could not be a traitor to King Edward I because he had never sworn allegiance or homage to him, nor was he ever Edward's subject.
- 29 February 1528: Patrick Hamilton (martyr), burnt at the stake for heresy at St Andrews.
- 6 July 1535: Sir Thomas More was beheaded for treason for refusing to acknowledge Henry VIII as the head of the Church of England.
- 17 May 1536: George Boleyn, 2nd Viscount Rochford was beheaded on false charges of committing adultery and incest with his sister Anne Boleyn.
- 19 May 1536: Anne Boleyn, second wife of Henry VIII and queen of England, was beheaded at the Tower of London on false charges of adultery, incest and treason so that Henry could marry Jane Seymour.
- 2 June 1537: Francis Bigod was hanged for treason.
- 12 July 1537: Robert Aske was hanged in chains for treason.
- 28 July 1540: Thomas Cromwell was beheaded on false charges of treason as punishment for arranging Henry VIII's ill-fated marriage to Anne of Cleves.
- 10 December 1541: Thomas Culpeper and Francis Dereham were executed for adultery for having affairs with queen of England Catherine Howard. Both were sentenced to be hanged, drawn and quartered, but Culpeper's sentence was commuted to beheading.
- 13 February 1542: Catherine Howard, fifth wife of Henry VIII and queen of England, was beheaded for adultery after having an affair with her cousin Thomas Culpeper. Her lady-in-waiting Jane Boleyn, Viscountess Rochford was beheaded the same day for facilitating her adultery.
- 13 April 1546: Alice Glaston became the youngest known girl legally executed in England, at age 11 for an unknown offence.
- 7 December 1549: Robert Kett was hanged from the walls of Norwich Castle for treason after he was found guilty of leading Kett's Rebellion against Edward VI. His brother William was executed the same day by being hanged from the walls of Wymondham Abbey.
- 22 August 1553: John Dudley, 1st Duke of Northumberland, was beheaded for treason.
- 12 February 1554: Lady Jane Grey, queen of England, and her husband Lord Guildford Dudley were beheaded for treason by Jane's successor Mary I.
- 11 April 1554: Thomas Wyatt the Younger was beheaded for treason for leading the Wyatt Rebellion against Mary I.
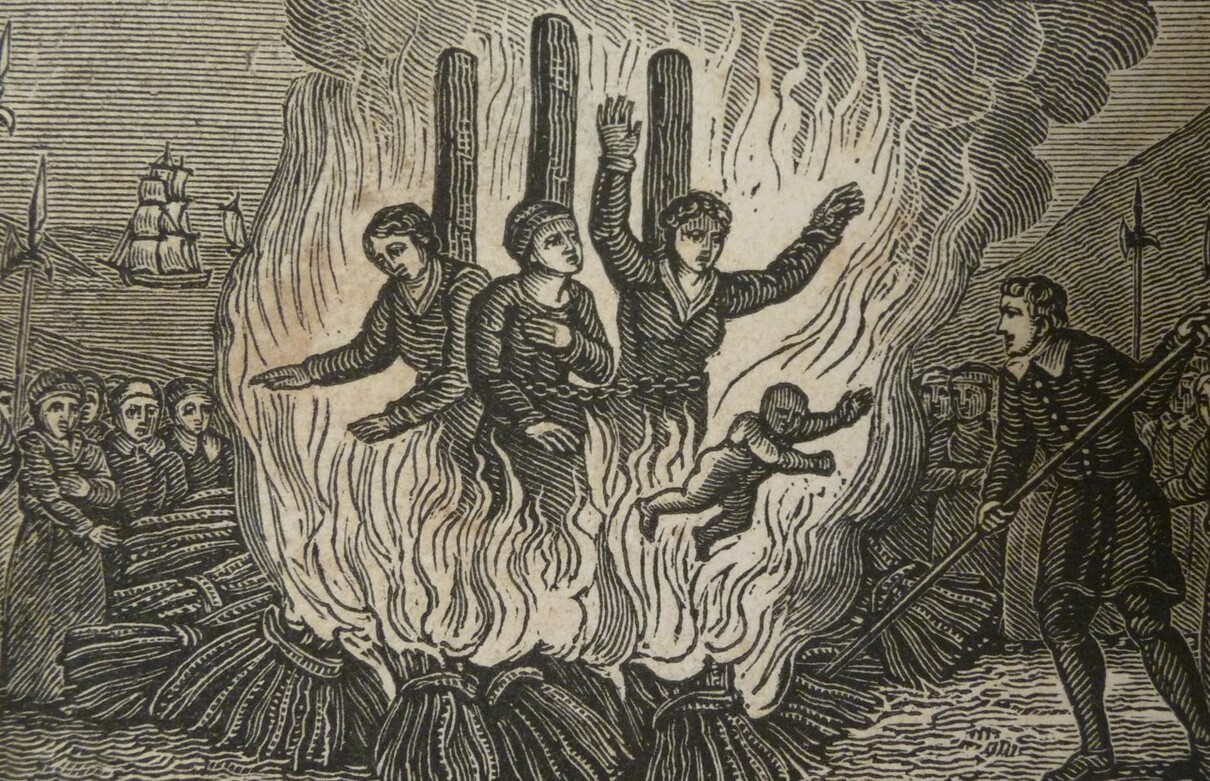
  Mother Catherine Cauchés (centre) and her two daughters Guillemine Gilbert (left) and Perotine Massey (right) with her infant son burning for their Protestant beliefs
- On or around 18 July 1556 on the island of Guernsey, the infant son of Perotine Massey, less than one day old, was ordered to be burned by Bailiff Hellier Gosselin, with the advice of Roman Catholic priests nearby who said the boy should burn due to having inherited moral stain from his mother.
- 21 March 1556: Thomas Cranmer was burned at the stake for heresy, despite recanting his Protestant beliefs multiple times.
- 2 June 1572: Thomas Howard, 4th Duke of Norfolk was beheaded for his involvement in the Ridolfi plot.
- 22 August 1572: Thomas Percy, 7th Earl of Northumberland was beheaded for leading the Rising of the North.
- July 1584: Sir Francis Throckmorton was executed for plotting to assassinate Elizabeth I in order to pave the way for a Spanish invasion.
- 20–21 December 1586: Anthony Babington, John Ballard and eleven others were hanged, drawn and quartered for conspiring to kill Elizabeth I and replace her with Mary, Queen of Scots.
- 8 February 1587: Mary, Queen of Scots was beheaded.
- 25 February 1601: Robert Devereux, 2nd Earl of Essex was beheaded for treason after he attempted to start a rebellion against Elizabeth I.
- 30 January 1606: Robert Wintour, Thomas Bates and John Grant were hanged, drawn and quartered for their involvement in the Gunpowder Plot, a conspiracy to blow up the House of Lords in order to kill King James I.
- 31 January 1606: Guy Fawkes, Sir Everard Digby, Robert Keyes, Ambrose Rookwood and Thomas Wintour were hanged, drawn and quartered for their involvement in the Gunpowder Plot, the day after the execution of their fellow conspirators.
- 21 May 1613: John Maxwell, 9th Lord Maxwell was beheaded for the murder of the Laird of Johnstone and the killings of several other members of Clan Johnstone during a feud between Clan Johnstone and Clan Maxwell.
- 29 October 1618: Walter Raleigh was beheaded at the Palace of Westminster for violating the 1604 Treaty of London by attacking a Spanish outpost during peacetime.
- 23 February 1629: John Dean became the youngest known person legally executed in England, at age 8 or 9 for arson.
- 30 January 1649: King Charles I was found guilty of high treason by 59 commissioners and was beheaded.
- 15 July 1685: James Scott, 1st Duke of Monmouth was beheaded at the Tower of London for leading the Monmouth Rebellion against King James II of England.

=== Kingdom of Great Britain, 1707–1801 ===
- 11 November 1724: Joseph "Blueskin" Blake was hanged at Tyburn for burglary. His partner-in-crime, Jack Sheppard, was executed for the same burglary five days later.
- 16 November 1724: Jack Sheppard, housebreaker, was hanged at Tyburn for burglary after four successful escape attempts from jail.
- 24 May 1725: Jonathan Wild, criminal overlord and fraudulent "Thief Taker General", was hanged at Tyburn for receiving stolen goods and thus aiding criminals.
- 7 April 1739: Dick Turpin, infamous highwayman, was hanged at Knavesmire.
- July-Nov 1746: seventeen Jacobite officers were hanged, drawn and quartered for high treason at Kennington Common (now Kennington Park). These included nine English, and one Welsh, officers of the Manchester Regiment and seven Scots captured at Carlisle and after Culloden.
- 9 April 1747: Simon Fraser, 11th Lord Lovat, Jacobite leader and Scottish Clan chief, was the last man to be publicly beheaded in Britain, at Tower Hill.
- 26 April 1748: Thomas Kingsmill, one of the leaders of the Hawkhurst Gang, was hanged at Tyburn and then gibbeted for smuggling
- 11 May 1748: Arthur Gray, leader of the Hawkhurst Gang, was hanged at Tyburn and then gibbeted for smuggling and the murder of a customs officer.
- 3 October 1750: James MacLaine, 'The Gentleman Highwayman', was hanged at Tyburn, London.
- 21 June 1751: Alexander Geddes was hanged at Gallows Hill in Aberdeen for bestiality, the last known execution for bestiality in Scotland.
- 14 March 1757: John Byng became the only British admiral executed, by firing squad by the Royal Navy. His crime was having failed to "do his utmost" at the Battle of Minorca during the Seven Years' War.
- 5 May 1760: Laurence Shirley, 4th Earl Ferrers was executed at Tyburn for the murder of a servant. He was the last peer to be hanged (reputedly by a silken rope) and is the only peer to have been hanged for murder.
- 3 April 1783: Highwayman John Austin was the last person to be hanged at Tyburn.
- 18 March 1789: Catherine Murphy, a counterfeiter, was the last woman in England to be burned at the stake (though she was in fact strangled before the fire was lit, and thus not literally burned to death). The penalty of burning at the stake, which at the time applied to women and not to men, was abolished the next year.
- 24 October 1795: Four Irishmen were convicted of the murder of William Marriott. James Cully, Thomas Markin and the two brothers Michael and Thomas Quin were all hanged in Wisbech. Cully and Michael Quinn's bodies were placed in gibbets. One gibbet is now in the Wisbech & Fenland Museum.

=== United Kingdom of Great Britain and Ireland, 1801–1922 ===
- 21 February 1803: Edward Despard and six others in the Despard Plot were hanged and decapitated on the roof of the gatehouse at Horsemonger Lane Gaol for allegedly plotting to assassinate King George III and launch an uprising.
- 13 November 1805: Richard Harding was hanged for uttering playing cards with a forged ace of spades. The attorney general in charge of the prosecution was Spencer Perceval.
- 18 May 1812: John Bellingham was hanged for the murder of Prime Minister Spencer Perceval.
- 1 May 1820: Five conspirators of the Cato Street Conspiracy were hanged and decapitated for planning to murder all the British cabinet ministers and the Prime Minister Lord Liverpool. Five other conspirators were transported to Australia.
- 8 September 1820: Andrew Hardie and John Baird were hanged and beheaded at Stirling after being tried for their part in the Radical War in Scotland.
- 11 August 1828: William Corder was hanged at Bury St Edmunds for the murder of Maria Marten at the Red Barn a year before.
- 28 January 1829: William Burke, one of Britain's first recorded serial killers, was hanged at Edinburgh Gaol for his participation in the Burke and Hare murders.
- 8 September 1830: William Wall, John Rowley and Richard Clarke were hanged at Kenn, Somerset, for the arson of three hay ricks. This was the last public execution in England to be held at the scene of the crime.
- 13 August 1831: Dic Penderyn was hanged on the gallows at St. Mary's Street, Cardiff for allegedly participating in the Merthyr Rising.
- 21 March 1834: George Capel was hanged in Aylesbury for bestiality, the last known execution for bestiality in England.
- 6 April 1835: Ursula Lofthouse was hanged in York for the murder of her husband by poisoning, the last woman to be executed in Yorkshire
- 10 August 1835: The Burnham Market poisoners Catherine Frary and Frances Billing were hanged at the gates of Norwich Castle. The last double public execution of women.
- 27 November 1835: James Pratt and John Smith were hanged in front of Newgate Prison for sodomy, the last known execution for sodomy in England.
- 30 March 1836: Richard Smith was hanged in front of Nottingham Prison for the rape of his 13-year-old servant girl Mary Green, the last known execution for rape in England.
- 25 March 1851: Sarah Chesham, an alleged serial poisoner, was the last woman to be hanged for attempted murder, at Chelmsford. In 2019, an episode of Murder, Mystery and My Family suggested that Sarah Chesham was innocent but the Criminal Case Review Commission refused an application to pardon her in 2022.
- 14 June 1856: William Palmer, now believed to have been a serial killer, was hanged at HM Prison Stafford for the murder of John Cook.
- 9 August 1856: Elizabeth Martha Brown was the last woman to be hanged in public in the English county of Dorset; her hanging is notable in part because it influenced Thomas Hardy, an eyewitness, in his portrayal of the execution of the fictional heroine of Tess of the D'Urbervilles.
- 27 August 1861: Martin Doyle was the last person to be hanged for attempted murder, at Chester.
- 29 April 1862: Mary Timney's hanging was the last public execution of a woman in Scotland.
- 14 November 1864: Franz Muller was hanged for the murder of Thomas Briggs, the first murder committed on a British train.
- 28 July 1865: Edward William Pritchard was hanged on Glasgow Green, the last public execution in Glasgow.
- 12 May 1867: Robert Smith was hanged at Buccleuch Street Prison for the robbery, rape and murder of nine-year-old Thomasina Scott, the last public execution in Scotland.
- 2 April 1868: Frances Kidder was the last woman to be hanged in public in Britain.
- 26 May 1868: Fenian Michael Barrett was executed at Newgate Prison for mass murder. He had participated in the Clerkenwell explosion, which had killed 12 people. His execution was the last public hanging in the UK.
- 1 April 1872: William Frederick Horry was hanged at Lincoln Castle. This was the first execution in history to use the long drop method of hanging.
- 24 March 1873: Serial killer Mary Ann Cotton was hanged at Durham Gaol for the murder of her stepson.
- 10 June 1896: Amelia Dyer was hanged at Newgate for the murder of 6 babies. It is now believed that she may have killed over 400 infants.
- 7 July 1896: Charles Thomas Wooldridge was hanged at Reading Gaol for the murder of his wife. The execution inspired Oscar Wilde's The Ballad of Reading Gaol.
- 19 July 1899: Mary Ansell was hanged at St Albans, for poisoning her sister. At 22, she was the youngest woman to be hanged in the post-1868 'modern era' (non-public, and by the 'long drop' method).
- 7 and 9 January 1903: Joseph Taylor and Mary Daly, who had been having an affair, were executed for the murder of Mary's husband, John Daly, in June 1902. Joseph Taylor, aged 26, was hanged in Kilkenny Prison on 7 January 1903, and Mary Daly, aged 36, was hanged in Tullamore Prison on 9 January 1903, the last woman executed before Ireland was partitioned.
- 3 February 1903: Amelia Sach and Annie Walters at HM Prison Holloway for the murder of an unknown amount of babies.
- 23 May 1905: Albert and Alfred Stratton, the first British murderers convicted based on fingerprint evidence, were hanged at HMP Wandsworth.
- 14 August 1907: Rhoda Willis was hanged at Cardiff Prison, the last baby farmer to be executed in Britain and the last woman to be executed in Wales.
- 23 November 1910: Hawley Harvey Crippen was hanged in London's Pentonville Prison for poisoning his wife.
- 8 September 1914: Private Thomas Highgate was executed by firing squad, the first British soldier to be executed for desertion during World War I.
- 13 August 1915: George Joseph Smith was hanged in Maidstone Prison for the pattern of serial killings known as the "Brides in the Bath Murders".
- 3–12 May 1916: Patrick Pearse, Thomas Clarke, Joseph Plunkett, Éamonn Ceannt, James Connolly, Seán Mac Diarmada and several others were shot at Kilmainham Gaol, Dublin, for their role in the Easter Rising.
- 3 August 1916: Roger Casement, a former government official, was hanged at Pentonville for high treason. He was convicted of conspiring with Germany, then at war with the United Kingdom, to incite insurrection in Ireland and to incite Irish soldiers serving in the British Army to mutiny.

=== United Kingdom of Great Britain and Northern Ireland, 1922–1964 ===
- 9 January 1923: Edith Thompson and Frederick Bywaters, in London's Holloway and Pentonville Prisons respectively, for the murder of Thompson's husband. The case was controversial because, although in letters Thompson had fantasised about the possible elimination of her husband, there was no firm evidence that she was in any way connected with the murder for which she was hanged.
- 10 October 1923: Susan Newell was hanged at Duke Street Prison for the murder of John Johnston, the last woman executed in Scotland.
- 3 January 1931: Victor Betts was hanged for his part in a murder committed during the course of a robbery. The case had established that a person need not be present when a crime is committed to be regarded as an accessory after the fact.
- 16 April 1936: Dorothea Waddingham, a nurse, was hanged at Winson Green Prison. She was convicted of murdering two of her patients, Mrs Baguley (89) and her daughter Ada (50) by administering morphine.
- 31 July 1940: Udham Singh, an Indian independence activist, was hanged at Pentonville Prison. He had assassinated the Indian administrator Sir Michael O'Dwyer.
- 15 August 1941: Josef Jakobs, a German spy, was executed by firing squad, the last execution in the Tower of London.
- 25 June 1942: Gordon Cummins, the "Blackout Ripper", was hanged at Wandsworth Prison. He had murdered four women in a 6-day period in February 1942.
- 2 September 1942: Tom Williams was hanged in the Crumlin Road Gaol for his involvement in the killing of Royal Ulster Constabulary (RUC) police officer Patrick Murphy during the Northern Campaign.
- 3 November 1942: Duncan Scott-Ford was hanged at Wandsworth Prison for treachery.
- 19 December 1945: John Amery, a British fascist and Nazi collaborator, pleaded guilty to eight charges of treason and was hanged at Wandsworth Prison in London.
- 3 January 1946: William Joyce, better known as "Lord Haw-Haw", was hanged for treason in London's Wandsworth Prison. He was an American citizen, but was convicted of treason because, as the holder of a British passport (albeit fraudulently obtained), he was held to have owed allegiance to the British sovereign.
- 4 January 1946: Theodore Schurch was hanged at Pentonville Prison for treachery, the last person executed for an offence other than murder.
- 16 October 1946: Neville Heath was hanged at Pentonville Prison for the rape and murder of two women.
- 27 February 1947: Walter Rowland was hanged in Manchester for the murder of Olive Balchin despite maintaining his innocence. While he had been awaiting execution, another man, David Ware, confessed to the crime. A Home Office report dismissed the latter's confession as a fake, but in 1951 he attacked another woman and was found guilty but insane and committed to Broadmoor Hospital.
- 12 January 1949: Margaret Allen, aged 43, was hanged for killing a 70-year-old woman in the course of a robbery, the first woman to be hanged in Britain for 12 years.
- 10 August 1949: John George Haigh, the "acid-bath murderer", was hanged at Wandsworth.
- 9 March 1950: Timothy Evans was hanged at Pentonville for the murder of his wife and daughter at 10 Rillington Place, West London. He initially claimed his wife died after drinking an abortion drug he gave her, but later withdrew the claim. Evans's downstairs neighbour, John Christie (whom Evans accused of committing the murder), later found to be a sexual serial killer, gave key evidence against Evans, but ultimately confessed to murdering Evans's wife himself shortly before he was executed in 1953. Evans received a posthumous pardon in 1966 after an investigation concluded that Christie also murdered Evans's daughter. In 2004 the Court of Appeal refused to consider overturning the conviction due to the costs and resources that would be involved, but acknowledged that Evans did not murder his wife or his daughter.
- 28 March 1950: George Kelly was hanged at Walton Prison, Liverpool, for murder, but had his conviction quashed posthumously by the Court of Appeal in June 2003.
- 25 April 1952: Edward Devlin and Alfred Burns were hanged for killing a woman during a robbery in Liverpool. They claimed that they had been doing a different burglary in Manchester, and others involved in the crime supported this. A Home Office report rejected this evidence. Huge crowds gathered outside Liverpool's Walton Prison as they were executed.
- 3 September 1952: Mahmood Hussein Mattan, a Somali seaman, was hanged in Cardiff for murder. The Court of Appeal quashed his conviction posthumously in 1998 after hearing that crucial evidence implicating another Somali was withheld at his trial.
- 28 January 1953: Derek Bentley was hanged at Wandsworth Prison as an accomplice to the murder of a police officer by his 16-year-old friend Christopher Craig. Craig, a minor, was not executed and instead served 10 years in prison. Bentley was granted a partial posthumous pardon on 29 July 1993, and the Court of Appeal fully overturned his conviction on 30 July 1998.
- 15 July 1953: John Christie was hanged at Pentonville for the murder of his wife Ethel. Christie was a serial killer and had murdered at least six other women (see also entry on Timothy Evans above).
- 13 December 1954: Styllou Christofi was hanged aged 53, the penultimate woman executed in Britain.
- 13 July 1955: Ruth Ellis, aged 28, was the last woman to be hanged in Britain. She was the 15th and youngest woman hanged in the 20th century.
- 23 July 1957: John Vickers was the first person to be hanged after the use of capital punishment was restricted by the Homicide Act 1957.
- 6 May 1958: Vivian Teed, 24, was hanged in Swansea for the murder of William Williams, the last person to be executed in Wales.
- 11 July 1958: Peter Manuel was hanged aged 31, the second to last person to be hanged in HM Prison Barlinnie and the third to last to be hanged in Scotland.
- 5 November 1959: Guenther Podola was the last person to be hanged for the murder of a policeman.
- 10 November 1960: Francis Forsyth was hanged at Wandsworth Prison for the murder of Alan John Jee, the last 18-year-old to be executed in Britain. His accomplice Norman Harris was hanged at Pentonville the same day.
- 22 December 1960: Anthony Miller, 19, was hanged in Glasgow's Barlinnie Prison for the murder of John Cremin. He was the last teenager to be executed in Britain and the penultimate person executed in Scotland.
- 20 December 1961: Robert McGladdery, 25, was hanged in Crumlin Road Gaol in Belfast. He was the last person to be executed in Northern Ireland, for the murder of Pearl Gamble in Newry.
- 4 April 1962: James Hanratty was hanged at Bedford after a controversial rape–murder trial. In 2002, Hanratty's body was exhumed and the Court of Appeal upheld his conviction after Hanratty's DNA was linked to crime scene samples.
- 15 August 1963: Henry Burnett was hanged aged 21 at Craiginches Prison in Aberdeen for the murder of seaman Thomas Guyan, the last hanging in Scotland.
- 13 August 1964: Peter Anthony Allen was hanged at Walton Prison in Liverpool, and Gwynne Owen Evans at Strangeways Prison in Manchester, for the murder of John Alan West. They were the last people executed in Britain.

== See also ==
- Black cap
- Capital punishment by country
- Capital punishment in Hong Kong
- Capital punishment in Scotland
- Capital punishment in Singapore
- Courts of the United Kingdom
- English criminal law
- Execution by firing squad in the United Kingdom
- Gallows hemp rope
- List of people gibbeted in the United Kingdom
- Murder, Mystery and My Family
- Shot at Dawn Memorial
- Wrongful execution
