= Capital punishment in Scotland =

History of the death penalty in Scotland

Europe holds the greatest concentration of abolitionist states (blue). Map current as of 2022 Abolished for all offences Abolished in practice Retains capital punishment

Capital punishment in Scotland was used from ancient times until the second half of the 20th century. The last execution took place in 1963, its use for murder was suspended in 1965, and it was finally abolished in 1969. Although unused, the death penalty remained a legally defined punishment for certain offences such as treason until it was completely abolished in 1998.

Due to Scotland being part of the United Kingdom which is a party to the European Convention on Human Rights, and human rights law being a reserved matter, the Scottish Parliament does not have the power to restore capital punishment.

== History ==
From ancient times, execution was used as a punishment for a wide range of offences, and was administered in a variety of ways.

In 1564, a decapitation machine, called ‘The Maiden’ was brought into service in Edinburgh and used to behead over 150 criminals between 1564 and 1710.

With Scotland part of the United Kingdom since 1707, the parliament of the United Kingdom passed the Criminal Procedure (Scotland) Act 1887 to abolish the death penalty in Scots law for crimes other than murder, "treason or rebellion against the Sovereign", and (in theory but not in practice) certain types of attempted murder.

In 1908, the Children Act 1908 banned the execution of juveniles under the age of 16 and in 1933 the minimum age for capital punishment was raised to 18 under the Children and Young Persons Act 1933.

The Murder (Abolition of Death Penalty) Act 1965 suspended the death penalty in both Scotland and England and Wales (but not in Northern Ireland) for murder for a period of five years, and substituted a mandatory sentence of life imprisonment; it further provided that if, before the expiry of the five-year suspension, each House of Parliament passed a resolution to make the effect of the Act permanent, then it would become permanent. In 1969, the Home Secretary proposed a motion to make the Act permanent, which was carried in the Commons on 16 December 1969, and a similar motion was carried in the Lords on 18 December.

The death penalty remained for other crimes until the dates mentioned below:

1. causing a fire or explosion in a naval dockyard, ship, magazine or warehouse (until the Criminal Damage Act 1971);
2. spying in ships of the Royal Navy, or its establishments abroad (until the Armed Forces Act 1981);
3. piracy with violence (until the Crime and Disorder Act 1998);
4. treason (until the Crime and Disorder Act 1998);
5. certain purely military offences under the jurisdiction of the armed forces. The last applicable offences (until the Human Rights Act 1998) were:
  1. serious misconduct in action;
  2. assisting the enemy;
  3. obstructing operations;
  4. giving false air signals;
  5. mutiny or incitement to mutiny; and
  6. failure to suppress a mutiny with intent to assist the enemy.

However, no executions were carried out in the United Kingdom for any of these offences after the abolition of the death penalty for murder.

=== Last execution and last death sentence ===
- Henry John Burnett, 21, was the last person to be executed in Scotland, on 15 August 1963 in Craiginches Prison, Aberdeen, for the murder of seaman Thomas Guyan.
- Patrick McCarron was the last person sentenced to death in Scotland, in 1964 for shooting his wife. He killed himself in prison in 1970.

=== Final abolition ===
The Criminal Damage Act 1971 abolished the offence of arson in royal dockyards.

The Armed Forces Act 1981 abolished the death penalty for the civilian offence of spying in navy ships or bases which had been created by the Naval Discipline Act 1957.

Beheading was abolished as a method of execution for treason in 1973. Hanging, however, remained available until 30 September 1998 when, under a House of Lords amendment to the Crime and Disorder Act 1998, proposed by Lord Archer of Sandwell, the death penalty was abolished for treason and piracy with violence, replacing it with a discretionary maximum sentence of life imprisonment. These were the last civilian offences punishable by death.

== Notable executions ==
- 29 February 1528: Patrick Hamilton (martyr), burnt at the stake for heresy at St Andrews.
- 8 September 1820: Andrew Hardie and John Baird were hanged and beheaded at Stirling after being tried for their part in the Radical War in Scotland.
- 28 January 1829: William Burke was hanged at Edinburgh Gaol for his participation in the Burke and Hare murders.
- 29 April 1862: Mary Timney's hanging was the last public execution of a woman in Scotland.
- 28 July 1865: Edward William Pritchard was hanged on Glasgow Green, the last public execution in Glasgow.
- 12 May 1867: Robert Smith was hanged at Buccleuch Street Prison for the robbery, rape and murder of nine-year-old Thomasina Scott, the last public execution in Scotland.
- 10 October 1923: Susan Newell was hanged at Duke Street Prison for the murder of John Johnston, the last woman executed in Scotland.
- 11 July 1958: Peter Manuel was hanged aged 31, the second last person to be hanged in HM Prison Barlinnie and the third last to be hanged in Scotland.
- 22 December 1960: Anthony Miller, 19, was hanged in Glasgow's Barlinnie Prison for the murder of John Cremin. He was the last teenager to be executed in Britain and the penultimate person executed in Scotland.
- 15 August 1963: Henry Burnett was hanged aged 21 at Craiginches Prison in Aberdeen for the murder of seaman Thomas Guyan, the last hanging in Scotland.

== Prohibition on reintroduction of capital punishment ==
On 20 May 1998, the House of Commons voted to ratify the 6th Protocol of the European Convention on Human Rights prohibiting capital punishment except "in time of war or imminent threat of war". The last remaining provisions for the death penalty under military jurisdiction (including in wartime) were removed when section 21(5) of the Human Rights Act 1998 came into force on 9 November 1998. On 10 October 2003, effective from 1 February 2004, the UK acceded to the 13th Protocol, which prohibits the death penalty in all circumstances.

== See also ==
- Capital punishment in the United Kingdom
- Capital punishment by country
- Wrongful execution
