= Robert C. Smith (disambiguation) =

Robert C. Smith, better known as Bob Smith (born 1941) is an American politician. Robert C. Smith may also refer to:

- Robert C. Smith (political scientist) (born 1947), political science professor at San Francisco State University
- Robert Carlisle Smith (1929–2001), Canadian sprint canoer
- Robert Cecil Smith (1912–2001), American actor
- Robert Chester Smith (1912-1975), American art historian
- Robert Colvin Smith (died 1868), last person to be publicly executed in Scotland
- Robert Cross Smith (1795–1832), English astrologer
- Robert Curtis Smith (1930–2010), American Piedmont blues singer, guitarist and songwriter
