= 1990 Bermudian death penalty referendum =

- 12 August 1990
- Are you in favour of capital punishment for premeditated murder in Bermuda?

Results
Choice	Votes	%
Yes	8,536	79.24%
No	2,237	20.76%
Valid votes	10,773	99.00%
Invalid or blank votes	109	1.00%
Total votes	10,882	100.00%
Registered voters/turnout	33,700	32.29%
- Registered voters figure is rounded.

A referendum on the death penalty for premeditated murder was held in Bermuda on 12 August 1990. The referendum was held following pressure from the United Kingdom government. The Parliament of Bermuda passed the Capital Punishment Referendum Act 1989 to provide for the referendum. Voters approved of retaining the penalty, with 79% voting in favour.

The death penalty was later abolished in December 1999 by the Parliament of Bermuda.

== History ==
As a British Overseas Territory, Bermuda had traditionally inherited British law with regards to legal punishments. The United Kingdom abolished the death penalty for murder in 1969, but retained it for the crimes of arson in royal dockyards, treason, piracy and espionage. However, this abolition did not extend to Bermuda due to them having self governance. The Parliament of Bermuda had debated abolishing it in 1979 following the hangings of Erskine Burrows and Larry Tacklyn for murdering the Governor, Sir Richard Sharples but nothing came of it. In 1989, they passed a law authorising a referendum to be held to determine if the public wished for Bermuda to retain the death penalty for premeditated murder. However, the referendum would be non-binding on the government.

== Results and aftermath ==
The referendum was the first ever called in Bermuda. The voters were asked if they supported or opposed retention of the death penalty. 79% of Bermudans who voted, voted in favour of retaining the death penalty. However, participation was low with only around 32% of the eligible electorate turning out to vote.

The death penalty for murder was abolished in 1991 in all other British Dependent Territories in the Caribbean due to the Caribbean Territories (Abolition of Death Penalty for Murder) Order 1991, though this did not extend to Bermuda. By 1997, a majority of Bermudian MPs had indicated they were against the death penalty. In December 1999, the Parliament of Bermuda voted to abolish the death penalty for any offence, effective from 1 January 2000.
