= Harold Wilkins =

Harold Wilkins may refer to:

- Harold A. "Hal" Wilkins (1888–1960), American attorney, manufacturer, and songwriter responsible for Hail to Old OSU
- Harold T. Wilkins (1891–1960), British journalist and historian
- Harold Wilkins (murderer), the last juvenile sentenced to the death penalty in the United Kingdom
