= Murder (Abolition of Death Penalty) Act 1965 =

Act of the Parliament of the United Kingdom

Murder (Abolition of Death Penalty) Act 1965 (Note: Section 3(1).)
- Act of Parliament
- Parliament of the United Kingdom
- Long title: An Act to abolish capital punishment in the case of persons convicted in Great Britain of murder or convicted of murder or a corresponding offence by court-martial and, in connection therewith, to make further provision for the punishment of persons so convicted.
- Citation: 1965 c. 71
- Introduced by: Sydney Silverman (private member's bill (Commons)
- Territorial extent: England and Wales; Scotland; Northern Ireland (court martial); (Note: Section 3(3).)

Dates
- Royal assent: 8 November 1965
- Commencement: 9 November 1965 (Note: Section 3(4).)
Other legislation
Amends	Offences within the Court Act 1541; Murder Act 1751; Judgment of Death Act 1823; Offences against the Person Act 1861; Capital Punishment Amendment Act 1868; Criminal Procedure (Scotland) Act 1887; Children and Young Persons Act 1933; Children and Young Persons (Scotland) Act 1937; Army Act 1955; Air Force Act 1955; Naval Discipline Act 1957; Homicide Act 1957
Amended by	Criminal Justice Act 1967; Statute Law (Repeals) Act 1973; Statute Law (Repeals) Act 1974; Criminal Procedure (Scotland) Act 1975; Powers of Criminal Courts (Sentencing) Act 2000; Criminal Justice Act 2003; Armed Forces Act 2006
Relates to	Northern Ireland (Emergency Provisions) Act 1973

Status: Amended

History of passage through Parliament

Text of statute as originally enacted

Revised text of statute as amended

Text of the Murder (Abolition of Death Penalty) Act 1965 as in force today (including any amendments) within the United Kingdom, from legislation.gov.uk.

The Murder (Abolition of Death Penalty) Act 1965 (c. 71) is an act of the Parliament of the United Kingdom. It abolished the death penalty for murder in Great Britain (the death penalty for murder survived in Northern Ireland until 1973). The act replaced the penalty of death with a mandatory sentence of imprisonment for life.

== Provisions ==
The act amended the Homicide Act 1957 (5 & 6 Eliz. 2. c. 11), which had already reduced hangings to only four or fewer per year.

The act was introduced to Parliament as a private member's bill by Sydney Silverman MP. The act provides that charges of capital murder at the time it was passed were to be treated as charges of simple murder and all sentences of death were to be commuted to sentences of life imprisonment. The legislation contained a sunset clause, which stated that the act would expire on 31 July 1970 "unless Parliament by affirmative resolutions of both Houses otherwise determines". Resolutions were passed in the Commons and Lords on 16 and 18 December 1969, thereby making the act permanent.

== Subsequent events ==
No executions have occurred in the United Kingdom since the Murder (Abolition of Death Penalty) Act 1965. The last were on 13 August 1964, when Peter Allen and Gwynne Evans were hanged for murdering John Alan West during a theft four months earlier, a death penalty crime under the 1957 act. The 1965 act left four capital offences: high treason, "piracy with violence" (piracy with intent to kill or cause grievous bodily harm), arson in royal dockyards and espionage, as well as other capital offences under military law.

The 1965 act did not extend to Northern Ireland, where Westminster seldom overrode the criminal law responsibility of the Parliament of Northern Ireland at Stormont. During the Troubles Westminster passed the Northern Ireland Constitution Act 1973, abolishing Stormont, and the Northern Ireland (Emergency Provisions) Act 1973, abolishing the death penalty for murder there. The death penalty was not fully abolished in the United Kingdom until 1998 by the Human Rights Act 1998 and the Crime and Disorder Act 1998.

== See also ==
- Death penalty
- Murder in English law
- Capital punishment in the United Kingdom
- Caribbean Territories (Abolition of Death Penalty for Murder) Order 1991
