= Children and Young Persons (Amendment) Act 1952 =

Act of the Parliament of the United Kingdom

Children and Young Persons (Amendment) Act 1952 (Note: Section 11(1).)
- Act of Parliament
- Parliament of the United Kingdom
- Long title: An Act to amend the Children and Young Persons Act, 1933, and section twenty-seven of the Criminal Justice Act, 1948; and for purposes connected therewith.
- Citation: 15 & 16 Geo. 6 & 1 Eliz. 2. c. 50
- Territorial extent: England and Wales (Note: Section 11(2).)

Dates
- Royal assent: 1 August 1952
- Commencement: 1 October 1952 (Note: Section 11(3).)
- Repealed: 5 November 1993
Other legislation
Amends	Children and Young Persons Act 1933; Criminal Justice Act 1948
Repealed by	Statute Law (Repeals) Act 1993

Status: Repealed

Text of statute as originally enacted

Revised text of statute as amended

The Children and Young Persons (Amendment) Act 1952 (15 & 16 Geo. 6 & 1 Eliz. 2. c. 50) was an act of the Parliament of the United Kingdom.

The act amended the Children and Young Persons Act 1933 (23 & 24 Geo. 5. c. 12), and section twenty-seven of the Criminal Justice Act 1948 (11 & 12 Geo. 6. c. 58).

== Subsequent developments ==
The whole act was repealed by section 1(1) of, and part VII of schedule 1 to, the Statute Law (Repeals) Act 1993, which came into force on 5 November 1993.
