= Martin Doyle (convict) =

- Born: 1835; Ireland
- Died: 27 August 1861 (aged 26); Chester, Cheshire, England
- Status: Executed by hanging
- Conviction: Attempted murder
- Penalty: Death

Martin Doyle (died 27 August 1861) was an Irishman who was the last person to be executed for attempted murder in the United Kingdom. He was sentenced to death in spite of the Criminal Law Consolidation Act (which made murder, treason, arson in royal dockyards and piracy the only crimes punishable by death) being in force at the time of his trial because it had not yet been granted Royal Assent when the crime was committed.

On 30 May 1861, Doyle and his lover Jane Brogine were in Church Lawton looking for work for Doyle when they stopped for a rest because Brogine had a headache. Brogine went to sleep and slept for around an hour in Doyle's lap before waking up to find Doyle attempting to strangle her. When she resisted, he battered her almost to death with a large rock, striking her 21 times, before strangling her into unconsciousness and leaving her for dead. He also attempted to rip out her tongue during the assault. Brogine survived the attack and managed to crawl into the road, where she was found by a man driving a horse and cart who brought her to a nearby public house, where she was examined by doctors before being sent to hospital. She had suffered 21 separate injuries during the assault.

Doyle was arrested for attempted murder and tried at the Chester Assizes. His intent was made clear by the fact that he had shouted "You shan't leave me! I came for your life, and I shall have it!" during the assault. His motive was variously given as either anger that Brogine had threatened to leave him if he did not find work or his mistaken belief that she had given him a venereal disease. Brogine was found to have syphilis, but only after the fact. Doyle was not found to have contracted it, either. He was found guilty after only a short deliberation and sentenced to death by Mr. Justice Crompton, who stated in his sentencing remarks that he was uncertain whether Brogine would survive her injuries. Doyle was hanged at Chester County Gaol on 27 August 1861.
