= Richard Harding (forger) =

British forger (1770–1805)

Richard Harding (1770 – 13 November 1805) was a British forger. He was capitally indicted and convicted of the forgery of brass duty legal stamps placed on the Ace of Spades and the selling and uttering of playing cards with the same, while knowing such duty stamp to be false. He was hanged at the Old Bailey, London, England in 1805.

== Duty on playing cards ==
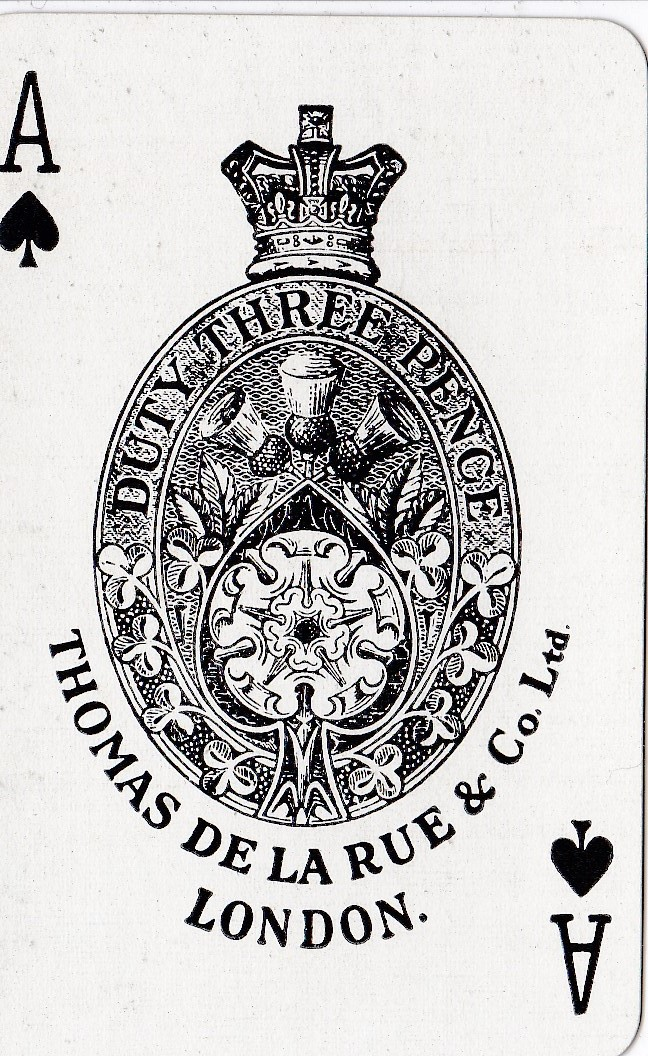
Ace with duty legal stamp

In England, during the 19th century, under the Stamp Act 1712 playing card manufacturers required a license, a duty legal stamp that incorporated the royal coat of arms of the United Kingdom to be placed on the ace of spades, known as the "duty card" or colloquially called the "duty ace" or "Old Frizzle" and a regulated label appended to the wrapper of the pack of playing cards. The brass duty legal stamps were kept at the office of the Stamp Commissioner and the stamped duty cards with the name of the card maker on them and the same number of labels were delivered to the card marker. These laws and regulations were to enforce the excise duty tax levied on every pack of playing cards. Card makers faced a monetary penalty for not following the laws under the Stamp Act.

A playing card manufacturer without a license could neither obtain a legal stamp for the ace of spades nor a regulated label placed on the wrapper of the pack of playing cards. An illegal manufacturer of playing cards would have to forge the brass legal stamp placed on the ace of spades and create a counterfeit label for the wrapper. In England, forgery and uttering was a capital offence in 1805.

== Court case ==
Richard Harding was indicted under the stamp laws for two offences. The indictment charged Harding with having counterfeited the impression of brass duty stamps authorized by the Stamp Commissioner for the purpose of denoting the duty on playing cards. It likewise charged Harding of vending and selling playing cards with these counterfeited impressions, knowing it to be so done.

More specifically, the first count was Harding feloniously did forge, counterfeit and resemble, on the ace of spades the impression of the mark used and denoted on the playing card, with intention to defraud the duty charged on playing cards.

The second count was Harding feloniously did vend and sell playing cards, with counterfeit impressions of the duty stamp on the ace of spades and Harding knowing the said marks to be counterfeited. And thirteen other counts for like offence, only charging them in a different manner.

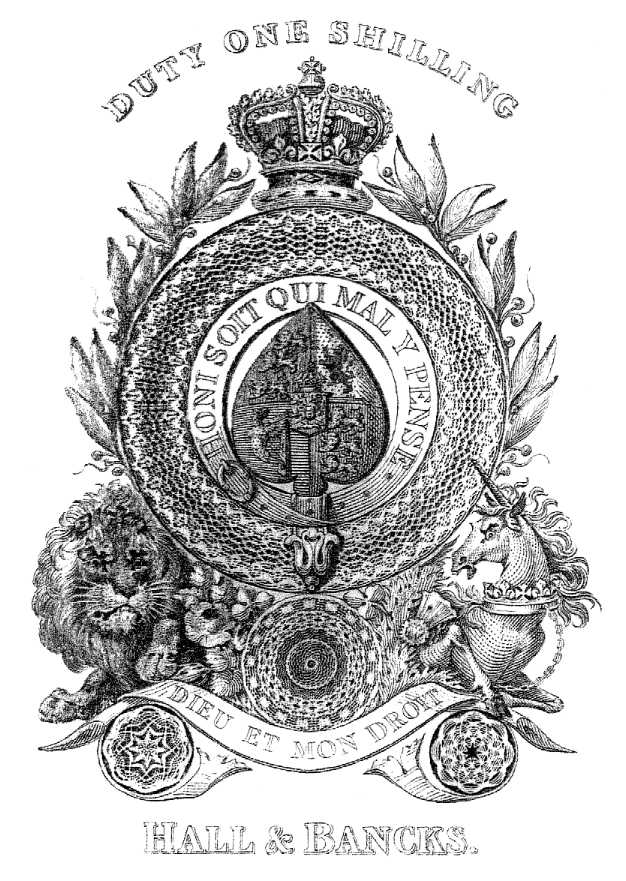
"Old Frizzle"

The attorney general, Spencer Perceval, opened the legal case against Harding and pursued the matter with great vigour.

The evidence supported that Harding was a licensed card maker and kept two licensed shops, in which he sold playing cards. The first shop was in Hereford Street, Oxford Road and the second shop in North Row, Grosvenor Square. Harding's print shop was behind the house of Mr. Skelton, a dealer in spirits and groceries, in Green Street, Grosvenor Square. This location was where Harding created the spurious ‘duty aces.’

Mr. Hockley of the Stamp Office, the official printer of the legal ace of spades, provided evidence to the Court that he bought from Harding and his apprentice packs of playing cards, which contained a counterfeited ace of spades.

Harding's apprentice gave testimony that he witnessed Harding manufacturing playing cards using forged brass duty legal stamps to place a duty stamp on the ace of spades and adhering counterfeit labels on the wrapper. Harding placed a substance on the labels to give them a gloss like the legal labels.

On Saturday, 21 September 1805, at the Old Bailey, London, Harding, was capitally indicted, before Mr. Justice Heath and a jury, on two counts:

1st. Forging, fabricating, and counterfeiting the legal stamp on the Ace of Spades.
2nd. Selling and uttering playing-cards with the same, while knowing such stamp to be false.

Justice Heath told the jury ‘there could be no doubt’ of Harding's guilt and they found Richard Harding guilty and he was sentenced to death by simple hanging at the age of 35.

== Execution ==
Contemporary newspapers of the time had made unsuccessful attempts to secure a reprieve for Harding. On 13 November 1805, Richard Harding's execution took place in the Old Bailey, by the hangman, William Brunskill.

== Aftermath ==
An account of the Court case against Harding was reported in the ‘Imperial Weekly Gazette’ published at 45, Old Bailey. The Forgery, Abolition of Punishment of Death Act 1832 was an Act of Parliament of the United Kingdom of Great Britain and Ireland, which abolished the death penalty for all offences of forgery, except for forging wills and certain powers of attorney. These exceptions were abolished under the Forgery Act 1837. In July 1960, the duties and taxes for the Ace of Spades was discontinued by the United Kingdom; however, the extravagant decoration on the Ace of Spades remains to this day.

== See also ==
- Capital punishment in the United Kingdom
- History of taxation in the United Kingdom
- Taxation in the United Kingdom
