= Vivian Teed =

Last person executed in Wales

- Born: 1934; United Kingdom
- Died: 6 May 1958 (aged 24); HM Prison Swansea, Swansea, Wales
- Cause of death: Execution by hanging
- Known for: Last person hanged in Wales
- Conviction: Capital murder
- Penalty: Death

Vivian Frederick Teed (1934 – 6 May 1958) was the last person to be hanged in Wales. He was charged with the murder of 73-year-old William Williams on 15 November 1957. The case was controversial at the time due to Teed's claims of mental illness, and may have hastened the abolition of capital punishment in the United Kingdom.

== Background ==
Teed was one of nine children brought up in Swansea. During the Second World War Teed was evacuated to a country village. He had served in the Royal Air Force but was discharged for going absent without leave. At the time of his arrest, he was unemployed and had two prior convictions for violent offences. Teed was in a relationship with a woman named Beryl Doyle, who lived with him in Limeslade.

== Murder of William Williams ==
On the night of 15 November 1957, Teed broke into the Fforestfach post office, where he had previously done some construction work, with intent to rob it. He was wearing women's silk stockings over his hands to avoid leaving fingerprints. Teed was not expecting anyone to be in the building, but encountered 73-year-old postmaster William Williams, who asked him what he was doing there. Teed panicked and beat Williams 27 times with a hammer before leaving the scene empty-handed. The beating was so violent that the hammer used in the attack snapped. Williams died of the injuries inflicted during the robbery.

Following his escape, Teed made his way to a nearby bar called the Cwmbwrla Inn. While there, he confessed to a man named Ronald Williams (no relation to the victim) that "I’ve done that Fforestfach job. I hit the man. I couldn’t find the safe keys and he was coming to, so I left him and didn’t take anything." Teed was known as a compulsive liar and Williams did not believe his story.

== Investigation ==
Williams' body was discovered the next morning by post office employee Margaret John. Police discovered Teed's footprints at the scene, along with one of the stockings he had used to conceal his fingerprints. The hammer used to kill Williams was traced back to a toolbox belonging to Teed's father. Teed was arrested three days after the murder. Police found Williams' blood on his clothes and shoes, and he soon confessed.

== Trial and execution ==
Teed was committed for trial on 19 November 1957. His trial took place in March 1958. The witnesses included several scientists who testified as to the forensic evidence against Teed, and a prison officer who stated that Teed had confessed to him while on remand. Teed's lawyers argued that he was "suffering from abnormality of the mind which impaired substantially his mental responsibility". The jury's deliberations were long and arduous; twice they failed to reach a verdict, but on the third occasion Teed was convicted of murder and sentenced to death. While awaiting execution, Teed was deemed sane by Home Office psychiatrists sent to assess his condition. An appeal was rejected a month after the conviction and Home Secretary Rab Butler rejected petitions for mercy. Teed was executed by hanging on 6 May 1958.
