= John the Painter =

Scottish saboteur (1752-1777)

James Aitken
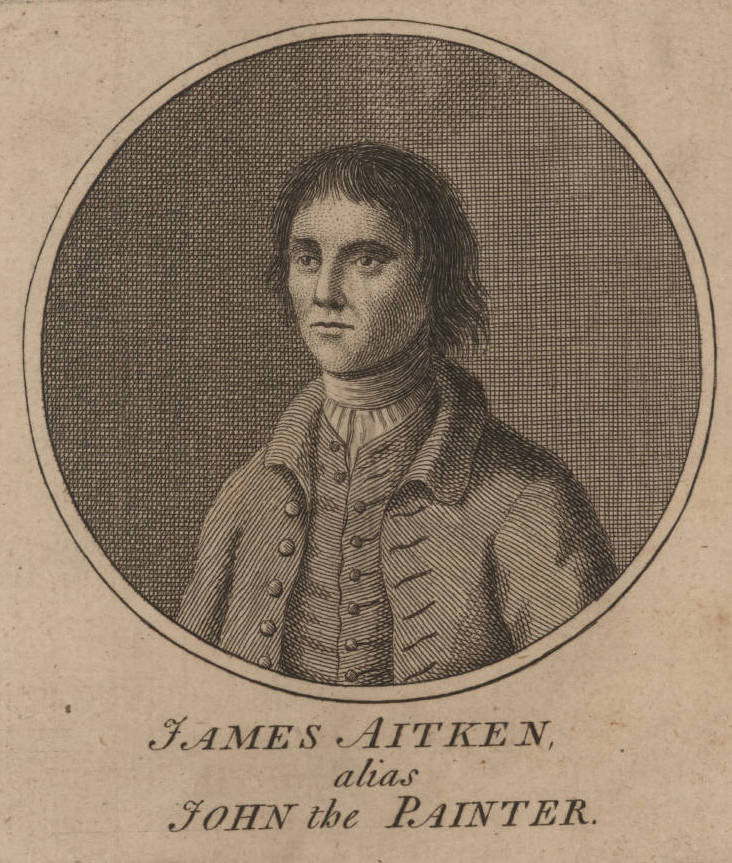
- 1777 engraving of James Aitken
- Born: 28 September 1752; Edinburgh
- Died: 10 March 1777 (aged 24); Portsmouth
- Cause of death: Hanging
- Other name: John the Painter
- Status: Executed
- Conviction: Arson in royal dockyards
- Penalty: Death

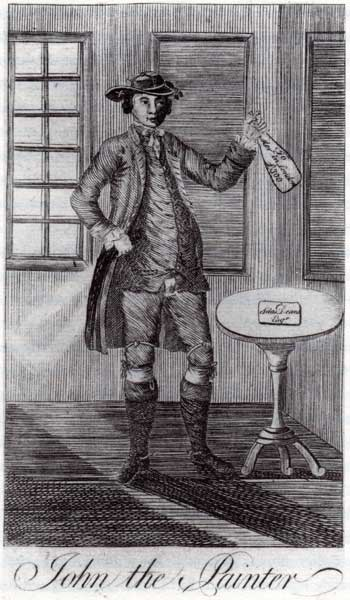
1777 illustration of Aitken

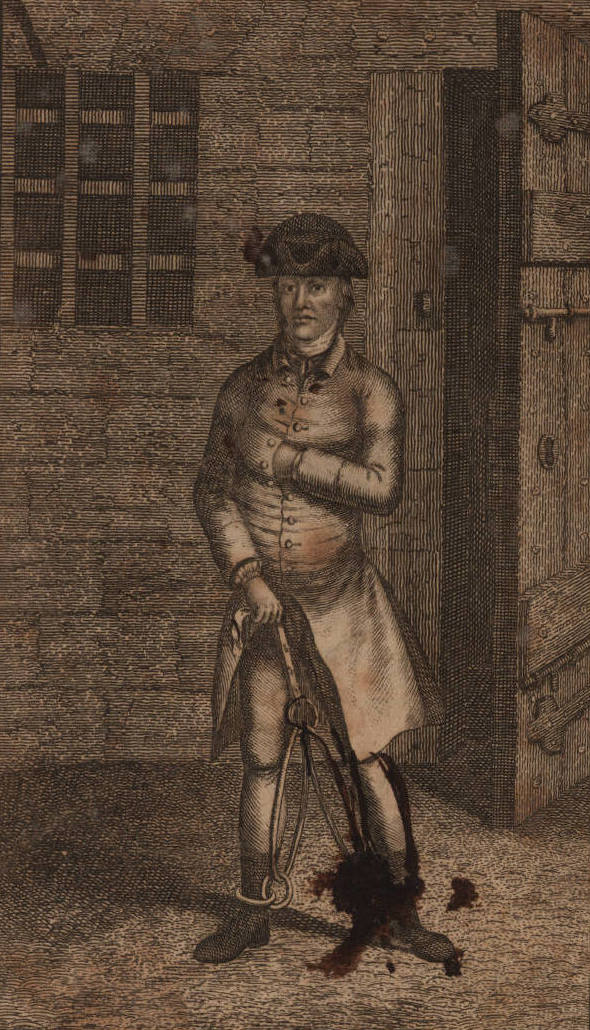
Portrait of Aitken in jail by W. Cave ad viv del

James Aitken (28 September 1752 – 10 March 1777), also known as John the Painter, was a Scottish mercenary who committed acts of sabotage in Royal Navy dockyards in 1776 and 1777 during the American Revolutionary War. He was captured and executed in March 1777.

== Early life ==
Aitken was born in Edinburgh in 1752, the son of a whitesmith and the eighth of twelve children. The early death of his father allowed Aitken to enter the charitable school for impoverished children at George Heriot's Hospital, which was founded to care for the "puir, faitherless bairns" of Edinburgh.

Upon leaving school at age 14, he tried his hand at a variety of low-paying trades, including an apprenticeship as a painter in 1767, before finding that the world of criminal activity offered him more immediate rewards. He admitted in his testament to being a highwayman, burglar, shoplifter, robber, and (on at least one occasion) a rapist:

... I made the best of my way through Winchester to Basingstoke, intending to return to London. Going over a down near Basingstoke, I saw a girl watching some sheep, upon whom, with some threats and imprecations, I committed a rape, to my shame it be said.

== Career as a saboteur ==
Fearful that his crimes would soon be detected, Aitken negotiated an indenture in exchange for a voyage to Jamestown, Virginia. He had no real intention of serving the terms of the indenture, however, and soon escaped to North Carolina. His next two years in the colonies were spent in such locales as Philadelphia, Boston, New York City, and Perth Amboy, New Jersey. It was during this period that he became exposed to revolutionary rhetoric, and Aitken claimed that he had been harassed by British troops for being a suspected Whig. At some point after a 1775 return trip to England he developed his scheme of committing political arsons. Some historians have speculated that Aitken was motivated by a desire to escape his life of insignificance and poverty, and believed that by striking a blow on behalf of the American revolutionaries, he would be recognised and handsomely rewarded for his efforts.

The British dockyards, Aitken believed, were vulnerable to attack, and he was convinced that one highly motivated arsonist could cripple the Royal Navy by destroying ships in the harbours, but more importantly the dockyards and ropewalks used to build, refit, and repair the massive Royal Navy fleet. Despite being a wanted fugitive for his other crimes, Aitken travelled freely to several dockyards to determine their vulnerability. Additionally, he travelled to Paris where he eventually forced himself into a meeting with American diplomat Silas Deane. Although Deane was sceptical that Aitken would be successful, Aitken left the meetings believing that he had the full backing of Deane and the American revolutionary government. Aitken never received remuneration beyond a few pounds that Deane lent him.

Aitken returned to England with Deane's instruction to meet the American expatriate, spy, and double-agent Edward Bancroft, and disclosed to Bancroft at least some of his intentions. Using his training with mixing chemicals and paint solvents from his trade as a painter, Aitken solicited the help of several others in constructing crude incendiary devices with the intention of burning down the highly flammable buildings in the Royal Dockyards. Over the course of several months Aitken attacked facilities in Portsmouth and Bristol, creating the impression that a band of saboteurs was on the loose in England.

== Manhunt, capture and imprisonment ==
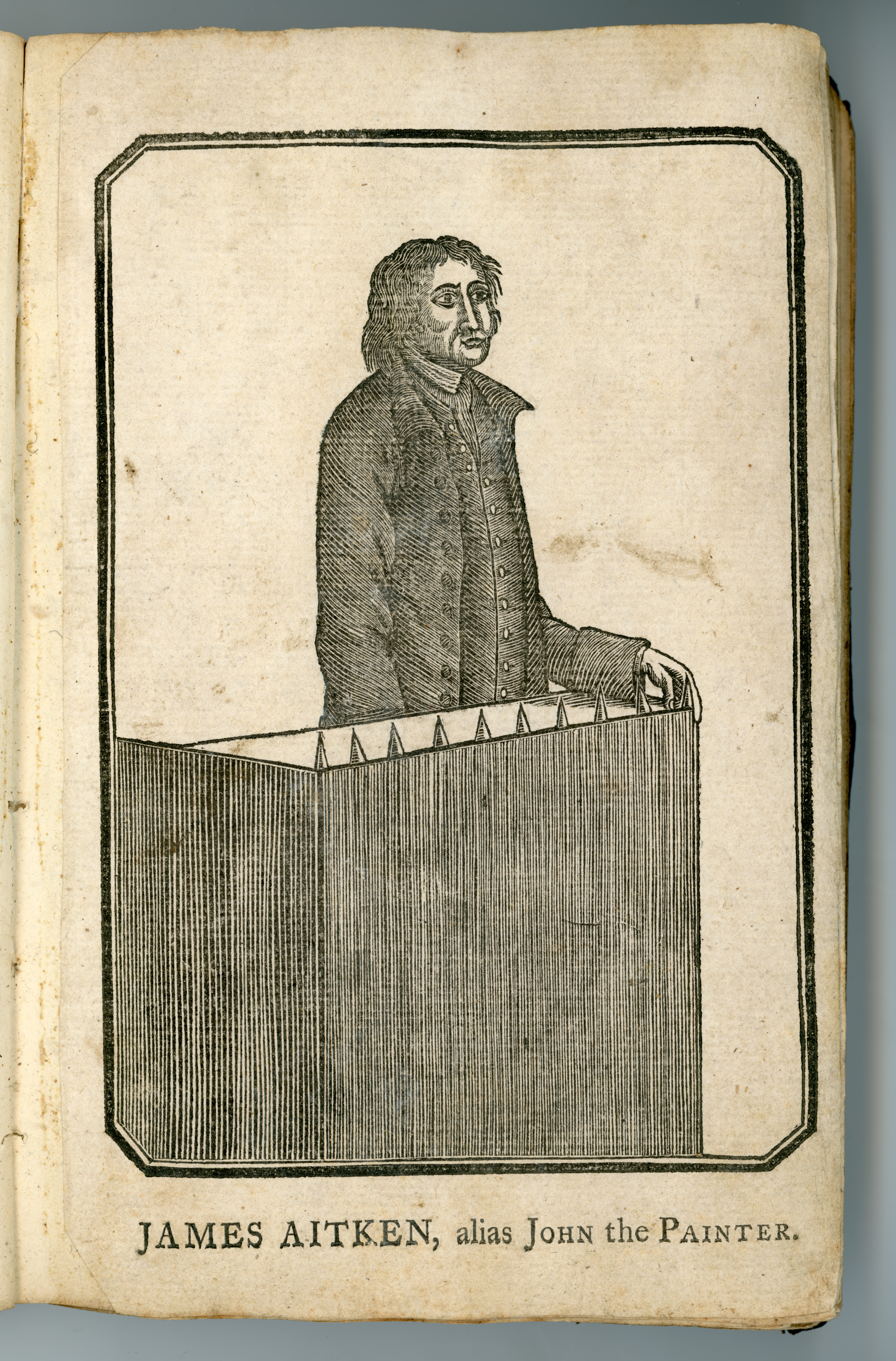
18th century woodcut of Aitken

Aitken's exploits, though only marginally successful at causing meaningful damage, did succeed in generating a significant amount of panic among the British public and government. Unsurprisingly, other fires detected during the same time period were incorrectly attributed to Aitken, fanning the alarm. At the height of the crisis, King George III was receiving frequent briefings and groups such as the Bow Street Runners were on the trail of Aitken. Eventually, through the help of Sir John Fielding, a description of Aitken naming him "John the Painter" and a reward for his capture were posted. Soon after, Aitken was arrested while travelling through the country.

Over the course of his imprisonment, British authorities were initially unsuccessful in gaining sufficient evidence to convict him of the sabotage. However, they soon co-opted John Baldwin, a young former Philadelphia painter, who visited Aitken frequently in prison and eventually gained his trust. Aitken soon provided a great deal of incriminating information to this agent, which was subsequently used in locating witnesses and strengthening the state's case against him.

== Trial and execution ==
British authorities hanged John the Painter on 10 March 1777 from the mizzenmast of HMS Arethusa for arson in royal dockyards after he was caught setting the rope house at Portsmouth on fire. The mast was struck from the ship and re-erected at the dockyard entrance so as many people as possible could watch the execution. It was the highest gallows ever used in an execution in England. Some 20,000 people reportedly witnessed the hanging. His remains were gibbeted and displayed at Fort Blockhouse for several years.

== See also ==
- Arson in royal dockyards
