= Ursula Lofthouse =

English mariticide (d. 1835)

Ursula Lofthouse (née Johnson, d. 6 April 1835) was a convicted mariticide and the last woman to be publicly executed in Yorkshire.

== Life ==
Lofthouse and her husband Robert were married in 1832 at St. Andrew's Church in Kirkby Malzeard, North Yorkshire. They lived in the village of Dallowgill where Robert worked as a clog and pattern maker.

Lofthouse poisoned her husband with two pennyworths of arsenic that she had bought at her local apothecary. She told the chemist that she was buying it for a neighbour. Just before he died, Robert complained of stomach pains and vomited. At first, it was thought that he died of cholera, as diagnosed by the doctor who attended his death. However, her brother-in-law was suspicious about the cause of death.

A post-mortem examination of his body was conducted at the Shoulder of Mutton Inn, which found that a small portion of arsenic was present in his stomach, "enough to produce death". When accused of murder, Lofthouse first protested her innocence. She was, however, committed to the female prison at York Castle.

She was convicted at the next Yorkshire Assizes of the "wilful murder" of Robert Lofthouse by poison, with the jury finding that "the deceased was feloniously and traitorously poisoned by his wife, Ursula Lofthouse." She "wept profusely" when the verdict was delivered.

Lofthouse was publicly executed by hanging at 11.30 am on 6 April 1835 at York Castle, with her execution attended by about 2,000 spectators. She was executed along with two other prisoners, William Allot and Joseph Heeley. After her death, her body was taken to Leeds Infirmary to be used by medical students in their anatomical studies. Copies of posters advertising her execution are held in the collection at the University of Hull Archives.
