= Ace of spades =

Playing card

Ace of spades

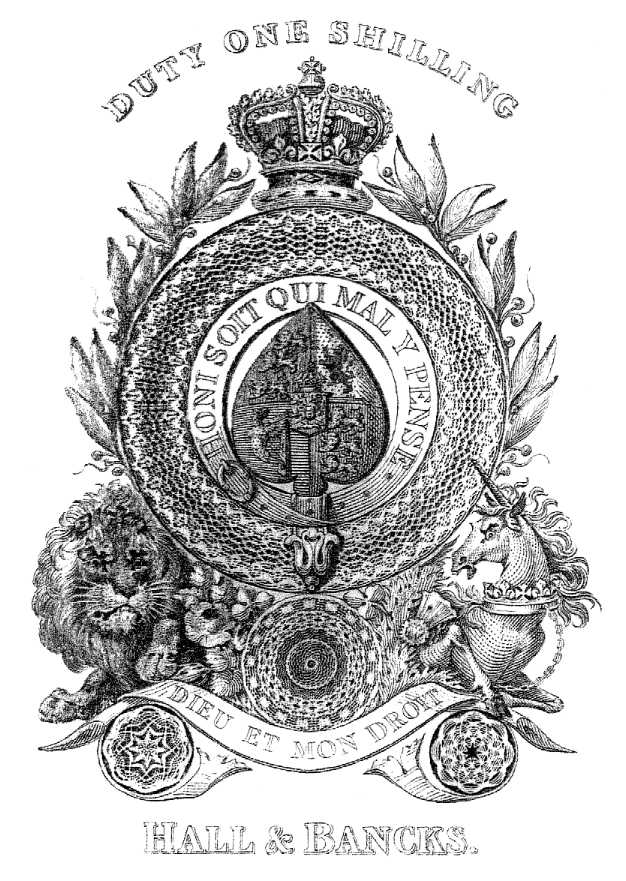
1828 "Old Frizzle"

The ace of spades (also known as the Spadille, Old Frizzle, Lancer, and Death Card) is traditionally the highest and most valued card in the deck of playing cards. The actual value of the card varies from game to game.

== Design ==
The ornate design of the ace of spades, common in packs today, stems from the 17th century, when James I and later Queen Anne imposed laws requiring the ace of spades to bear an insignia of the printing house. Stamp duty, an idea imported to England by Charles I, was extended to playing cards in 1711 by Queen Anne and lasted until 1960.

Over the years, a number of methods were used to show that duty had been paid. From 1712 onwards, one of the cards in the pack, usually the ace of spades, was marked with a hand stamp. In 1765 hand stamping was replaced by the printing of the official ace of spades by the Stamp Office, incorporating the royal coat of arms. In 1828 the Duty Ace of Spades (known as "Old Frizzle") was printed to indicate a reduced duty of a shilling had been paid.

One maker of cards was caught in possession of forged aces and the equipment to produce them. This was a capital offence, and the prosecutor Attorney General Spencer Perceval (later to become the prime minister assassinated in 1812) obtained the conviction of Richard Harding, who was hanged in 1805. The association of the ace of spades with death may spring from such events.

The system was changed again in 1862 when official threepenny duty wrappers were introduced and, although the makers were free to use whatever design they wanted, most chose to keep the ornate ace of spades that is popular today. The ace of spades is thus used to show the card manufacturer's information.

Since 1882, an annual pack of cards has been produced by the Worshipful Company of Makers of Playing Cards at the installation of each Master and, since 1888, a portrait of the Master has appeared at the centre of the ace of spades.

The exact design of the ace card was so important that it eventually became the subject of design patents and trademarking. For example, on 5 December 1882, George G. White was granted U.S. design patent US0D0013473 for his design. His ace design was adorned with male and female figures leaning onto the spade from either side.

== Symbolism ==
Ace of spades death card

=== War ===
The ace of spades has been employed on several occasions in the theatre of war. In the First World War, the 12th (Eastern) Division of the British Army used the Ace of spades symbol as their insignia. In the Second World War, the 25th Infantry Division of the Indian Army used an Ace of Spades on a green background as their insignia.

In World War II, the soldiers of the 506th Parachute Infantry Regiment of the American 101st Airborne Division were marked with the spades symbol painted on the sides of their helmets. In this capacity, it was used to represent good luck, due to its fortunate connotations in card playing. Following the confusion of a large-scale combat airborne operation, all four card-suits were used for ease of identification of regiments within the airborne division. Battalions within the regiments were denoted with tic marks or dots, struck from top clockwise: headquarters at the twelve o'clock position, 1st Battalion at the three o'clock, etc.

During the Vietnam War, the ace of spades was used as a tool of psychological warfare as it was common practice by US soldiers to leave the ace card on the bodies of killed Vietnamese. They thought that the card's connections to French colonial rule of Vietnam and putative symbolism in Vietnamese tradition to mean death and ill-fortune would frighten and demoralise Viet Cong soldiers. This custom was said to be so common that the United States Playing Card Company was asked by Charlie Company, 2nd Battalion, 35th Infantry Regiment to supply crates of that single card in bulk. The plain white tuck cases were marked "Bicycle Secret Weapon", and the cards were deliberately scattered in villages and in the jungle during raids. The ace of spades, while not a symbol of superstitious fear to the Viet Cong forces, did help the morale of American soldiers. Some U.S. soldiers and Marines were reportedly sticking this card in their helmet band as a sort of anti-peace sign.

=== Asexuality ===
Ace cards are used to symbolise asexuality, in reference to the phonetic shortening of that word. The ace of spades symbolises aromantic asexuality; those who are both asexual and alloromantic use the ace of hearts.

== Idioms ==
Various idioms involving the ace of spades include "black as the ace of spades," which may refer either to completely black; totally without light or colour, colour, race, (lack of) morality, or (lack of) cleanliness in a person. (Note: For an example of the card referring to race, see Aaron McGruder, Public Enemy #2: An All-New Boondocks Collection (New York: Three Rivers Press, 2005), front cover.)

The French expression fagoté comme l'as de pique translates to "(badly) dressed like the ace of spades."

== Encoding ==
The ace of spades is encoded into Unicode with the code point U+1F0A1, as part of the playing cards Unicode block.

Character information
Preview	🂡	
Unicode name	PLAYING CARD ACE OF SPADES	
Encodings	decimal	hex
Unicode	127137	U+1F0A1
UTF-8	240 159 130 161	F0 9F 82 A1
UTF-16	55356 56481	D83C DCA1
Numeric character reference	&#127137;	&#x1F0A1;

== See also ==
- Black Spot (Treasure Island)
- List of playing-card nicknames
- French-suited playing cards
- Trump cards
- Tax stamp
- Black Spades
