= Children and Young Persons Act 1933 =

Act of the Parliament of the United Kingdom

Children and Young Persons Act 1933 (Note: Section 109(1).)
- Act of Parliament
- Parliament of the United Kingdom
- Long title: An Act to consolidate certain enactments relating to persons under the age of eighteen years.
- Citation: 23 & 24 Geo. 5. c. 12
- Territorial extent: England and Wales (Note: Section 109(3).)

Dates
- Royal assent: 13 April 1933
- Commencement: various (Note: Section 109(2).)
Other legislation
Amends	See § Repealed enactments
Repeals/revokes	See § Repealed enactments
Amended by	Administration of Justice (Miscellaneous Provisions) Act 1933; Local Government Act 1933; Public Health Act 1936; National Assistance Act 1948; Criminal Justice Act 1948; Justices of the Peace Act 1949; Costs in Criminal Cases Act 1952; Children and Young Persons (Amendment) Act 1952; Licensing Act 1953; Sexual Offences Act 1956; Homicide Act 1957; Mental Health Act 1959; London Government Act 1963; Police Act 1964; Murder (Abolition of Death Penalty) Act 1965; Criminal Law Act 1967; Social Work (Scotland) Act 1968; Courts Act 1971; Consumer Credit Act 1974; Child Care Act 1980; Acquisition of Land Act 1981; Cinemas Act 1985; Statute Law (Repeals) Act 1986; Statute Law (Repeals) Act 1993; Sunday Trading Act 1994; Police Act 1996; Crime and Disorder Act 1998; Youth Justice and Criminal Evidence Act 1999; Powers of Criminal Courts (Sentencing) Act 2000; Domestic Violence, Crime and Victims Act 2004; Criminal Justice and Immigration Act 2008; Criminal Justice and Courts Act 2015; Modern Slavery Act 2015; Voyeurism (Offences) Act 2019; Sentencing Act 2020; Tobacco and Vapes Act 2026
Relates to	Children and Young Persons (Scotland) Act 1937; Children and Young Persons Act (Northern Ireland) 1950

Status: Amended

Text of statute as originally enacted

Revised text of statute as amended

Text of the Children and Young Persons Act 1933 as in force today (including any amendments) within the United Kingdom, from legislation.gov.uk.

The Children and Young Persons Act 1933 (23 & 24 Geo. 5. c. 12) is an act of the Parliament of the United Kingdom that consolidated all existing child protection legislation for England and Wales into one act. It was preceded by the Employment of Women, Young Persons, and Children Act 1920 (10 & 11 Geo. 5. c. 65) and the Children Act 1908 (8 Edw. 7. c. 67). It is modified by the Children and Young Persons Act 1963, the Children and Young Persons Act 1969 and the Children and Young Persons Act 2008.

== Content ==
The Children and Young Persons Act 1933 raised the minimum age for execution to eighteen, raised the age of criminal responsibility from seven to eight, included guidelines on the employment of school-age children, set a minimum working age of fourteen, and made it illegal for adults to sell cigarettes or other tobacco products to children under sixteen. The act is worded to ensure that adults and not children are responsible for enforcing it.

In 1932, 16-year-old Harold Wilkins was sentenced to death for murder, but the death sentence was commuted.

== History ==
The act was passed a year after the Children and Young Persons Act 1932 (22 & 23 Geo. 5. c. 46) broadened the powers of juvenile courts and introduced supervision orders for children at risk.

Some sections of the act concerning the employment of children are still in force today.

Sections 39 and 49 of the act remain in everyday use in order to protect the identity of juvenile defendants appearing in Courts in England and Wales.

== Section 39 and 49: information for journalists ==
Sections 39 and 49 are used to protect the identity of children and young people (under age 18) who appear in court as a witness, victim or defendant. Journalists may not give the following about any such person:

- Name
- Address
- School
- Still or moving image
- Any particulars likely to lead to their identification

The differences between the sections are that Section 39 is discretionary, but section 49 is automatically given in the youth courts. However, the court may waive the provisions of section 49 in the following circumstances:

- If it appropriate to avoid doing injustice to the accused; for example, if they need people to come forward to say the accused was at a meeting in London when the crime was committed in Liverpool, or they are using a defence of mistaken identity.
- On application by or on behalf of the Director of Public Prosecutions, if the police need to trace someone who is accused of an offence that would be punishable by a maximum sentence of 14 years imprisonment or more if committed by an adult, or of a violent, sexual or terrorism offence. There is an unofficial defence to the Contempt of Court Act 1981 that allows for police appeals, which will not be prosecuted if done in reasonable terms.
- If it is in the public interest to identify them, for example as a warning to others who may commit a similar offence. This was particularly used if an ASBO was issued against the offender, as the publicity was essential to its enforcement. (ASBOs were abolished and superseded in 2015.)

These only apply once proceedings are activated by an arrest or a summons issued.

== Repealed enactments ==
Section 109(4) of the act repealed 8 enactments, listed in the sixth schedule to the act.

Citation	Short title	Extent of repeal
8 Edw. 7. c. 67	Children Act 1908	Sections twelve to seventeen, nineteen, twenty-four, twenty-seven to thirty-two, thirty-five, and thirty-seven; subsection (2) of section thirty-eight; sections thirty-nine to forty-three, ninety-four, ninety-five, ninety-seven to one hundred and six, one hundred and nine, and one hundred and fourteen to one hundred and twenty-one; in section one hundred and twenty-three, subsection (1); in subsection (2) the words "or indictment," from the words "or any of the offences" to the words "Criminal Law Amendment Act, 1885," the words "by or," the words "was a child or young person or" and the words "a child or young person or to have been," wherever those words occur; and subsections (3) and (4); section one hundred and twenty-four; in section one hundred and twenty-seven the words "or young person" wherever those words occur; sections one hundred and twenty-eight and one hundred and thirty; in section one hundred and thirty-one the definitions of "guardian," "local education authority," "police authority," "street," "public place," and "intoxicating liquor," and in the definitions of "legal guardian" and "place of safety" the words "child or young person"; and the First Schedule.
10 Edw. 7 & 1 Geo. 5. c. 25	Children Act (1908) Amendment Act 1910	The whole act.
3 & 4 Geo. 5. c. 7	Children (Employment Abroad) Act 1913	The whole act, as well in its application to Scotland and Northern Ireland as in its application to England.
4 & 5 Geo. 5. c. 58	Criminal Justice Administration Act 1914	Subsection (2) of section twenty-eight.
15 & 16 Geo. 5. c. 86	Criminal Justice Act 1925	Section forty-eight.
20 & 21 Geo. 5. c. 21	Children (Employment Abroad) Act 1930	The whole act, as well in its application to Scotland and Northern Ireland as in its application to England.
22 & 23 Geo. 5. c. 46	Children and Young Persons Act 1932	Sections one to sixty-three; section sixty-four, as well in its application to Northern Ireland as in its application to England; in section seventy from the words "and in the definitions" to the end of the section; sections seventy-one to seventy-six, seventy-eight, sections eighty to eighty-six; in subsection (1) of section eighty-seven the definitions of "Chief Officer of Police," "Metropolitan Police Court Area," "needing care or protection," and "prescribed," and subsections (2), (3) and (4) of that section; section eighty-eight; in subsection (2) of section ninety the words "save as otherwise expressly provided;" the First Schedule; the Second Schedule, except so far as it relates to the following provisions of the Children Act 1908, that is to say, sections one, two, three, eight and nine, subsection (2) of section one hundred and twenty-three, and the definitions in section one hundred and thirty-one of "young person," "legal guardian," "place of safety," "police fund" and "common fund"; and the Third and Fourth Schedules.
22 & 23 Geo. 5. c. 47	Children and Young Persons (Scotland) Act 1932	Section fifty-eight.
