= Murder of Olive Balchin =

1946 murder in Manchester, England

Olive Balchin (c. 1906 – 20 October 1946) was a British murder victim whose body was found near a bomb site in Manchester, England. The murder weapon, a bloodstained hammer, was found nearby. After a lengthy investigation, police were given a description of a man who purchased a hammer from a local shopkeeper, which was similar to the description that eyewitnesses provided of a man last seen in the company of Balchin on the night of her murder. Based on this information, police questioned Walter Graham Rowland, a man who had been convicted in 1934 of murdering his two-year-old daughter. His death sentence for that crime was commuted to life imprisonment. Rowland was released after serving eight years, due to the onset of World War II and the need for able-bodied men. He served in the British Expeditionary Force, but was discharged within months due to mental health issues.

A forensic examination of Rowland's clothes showed a bloodstain as well as dust particles and plant debris traced to the bomb site. Police arrested Rowland for Balchin's murder. Upon being arrested he allegedly remarked "You don't want me for killing that woman, do you?", although he denied this. He was convicted and held at Strangeways Prison.

While Rowland was in prison awaiting execution, a prisoner at Walton Jail in Liverpool, David J. Ware, made unprompted three confessions to the crime – first in writing to the governor of the prison, then to police, and finally to Rowland's lawyer. The confession was quickly followed by a retraction wherein Ware admitted to confessing because he wanted to appear "swank," and said that he had obtained details of the murder from newspapers he read in prison. There were also questions as to Ware's mental state, as he had been discharged from the British Army in 1943 after a diagnosis of manic depressive psychosis. Additionally, unlike Rowland, there was no forensic evidence found that tied Ware to the murder scene.

Despite the retraction, Rowland's lawyer argued for his conviction to be overturned on appeal because of Ware's confession. Several witnesses also claimed to have seen a man resembling Rowland drinking at a pub in Stockport on the night of the murder. The motion failed and Rowland was hanged on 27 February 1947. A Home Office inquiry determined that Ware had made a false confession, and therefore found no impropriety with regards to the conviction.

In 1951, Ware attacked a woman with a hammer, and was found guilty of attempted murder. He was deemed not criminally responsible due to insanity and was committed to Broadmoor Hospital. This attack, coupled with his prior confession to the Balchin murder, led some in Britain to believe that Rowland had been falsely convicted and was the victim of a miscarriage of justice. The matter is still occasionally raised in debates about the death penalty and wrongful convictions in Britain.
