= Robert Smith (murderer) =

Scottish murder and last person to be publicly executed in Scotland (d. 1868)

Robert Colvin Smith
- Born: 1849; Scotland
- Died: 12 May 1868 (aged 19); Buccleuch Street Prison, Dumfries, Scotland
- Status: Executed by hanging
- Convictions: Murder; Attempted murder
- Penalty: Death

Robert Colvin Smith (died 12 May 1868) was the last person to be publicly executed in Scotland.

On 1 February 1868, Smith, a 19-year-old labourer, encountered 9-year-old Thomasina Scott at the home of Jane Crichton in Cummertrees and offered to accompany her to Annan, where her mother had sent her to run an errand. Upon reaching Crofthead Wood, Smith took Scott's money, raped her and then strangled her to death. Two hours later, Crichton came upon Smith returning from the crime scene; fearing she could implicate him, Smith threw her to the ground and attempted to cut her throat, but she managed to escape. A group of men set out after Smith and found Scott's body several miles away.

Smith fled to a boarding house in nearby Dumfries, but was soon found and apprehended after the proprietor reported a man staying with blood on his clothes. A bootlace presumed to have been used to strangle Scott was found in his pocket. Smith was convicted of murder, rape, robbery and attempted murder and sentenced to death by hanging. He was hanged by Thomas Askern on 12 May 1868 at Buccleuch Street Prison (which, coincidentally, had hosted the hanging of Mary Timney, the last woman publicly executed in Scotland, some five years earlier). This was the last execution in Scotland before the Capital Punishment Amendment Act abolishing public executions came into force.

Smith's death mask can be viewed in Dumfries Museum to this day.
