= Caribbean Territories (Abolition of Death Penalty for Murder) Order 1991 =

- Statutory Instrument
- Privy Council of the United Kingdom
- Citation: SI 1991/988
- Territorial extent: Anguilla; British Virgin Islands; Cayman Islands; Montserrat; Turks and Caicos Islands

Dates
- Made: 16 April 1991
- Laid before Parliament: 16 April 1991
- Commencement: 10 May 1991

Other legislation
- Made under: West Indies Act 1962; Anguilla Act 1980

Status: Current legislation

Text of statute as originally enacted

The Caribbean Territories (Abolition of Death Penalty for Murder) Order 1991 (SI 1991/988) is an Order-in-Council issued by the Privy Council of the United Kingdom abolishing the death penalty for murder in the British Dependent Territories in the Caribbean.

== History ==
The United Kingdom abolished the death penalty for murder in 1969. However this abolition was not extended to the Crown colonies. The reason for them not being included was due to local favour of retaining the death penalty. Such was the strength of feeling that in 1978, the Royal Navy sent a warship to the British Virgin Islands in preparation for any unrest after the Governor of the British Virgin Islands elected to commute death sentences.

== Law ==
In 1991, the Governor of Anguilla Brian Canty had come under local criticism for commuting the death sentence of a Grenadan prisoner against the advice of the Prerogative of Mercy Committee of the Anguillian Executive Council. He was also due to oversee another planned execution where no recommendation for mercy was made, when a Foreign and Commonwealth Office minister called him saying they were planning to abolish the death penalty in the British Caribbean territories. The Governor requested the order be expedited so he did not have to carry out the execution. Queen Elizabeth II issued the Order-in-Council abolishing the death penalty for murder in the UK's dependent territories of Anguilla, the British Virgin Islands, the Cayman Islands, Montserrat and the Turks and Caicos Islands. Bermuda was not included in the order due to having self-governance. They would later abolish the death penalty for murder in 1999 following an act of the Parliament of Bermuda. The Turks and Caicos Islands retained the death penalty for treason and piracy before completely abolishing it in 2002 due to the British government exercising powers to do so under the West Indies Act 1962.

== See also ==
- British Overseas Territories
- Crime in the United Kingdom
- Death penalty in the United Kingdom
- List of law enforcement agencies in the United Kingdom, Crown Dependencies and British Overseas Territories#Overseas Territories
- Royal prerogative of mercy
