= Harold Wilkins (murderer) =

English juvenile convict (1916–1999)

Harold Haywood Wilkins (5 March 1916 – 29 December 1999) was the last juvenile to be sentenced to death in the United Kingdom, on 17 November 1932 at the age of 16. He was convicted of the sexually motivated murder of 31-year-old kennel maid Ethel Corey. The jury made a recommendation for mercy on account of Wilkins's age. The judge took the unusual course of not donning the black cap, indicating that there was no intention of Wilkins being hanged since Parliament was already preparing to ban the execution of juvenile offenders entirely. The execution of those under the age of 16 had been banned by the Children Act 1908 (8 Edw. 7. c. 67). The age was further raised to 18 in the year after Wilkins's conviction, by the Children and Young Persons Act 1933.

As expected, within days, Wilkins's sentence was commuted to life in prison due to his age. He was released from prison in 1943. In 1949 he married Margaret E. Caddick. It is believed they had at least one child, although this is unconfirmed.
