= Mary Timney =

Scottish murderer

- Died: 29 April 1862; Dumfries Prison, Dumfries, Scotland
- Cause of death: Execution by hanging
- Status: Executed
- Conviction: Murder
- Penalty: Death by hanging

Mary Timney (died 29 April 1862) was the last woman publicly executed in Scotland. She had been convicted of the murder of her landlady Ann Hannah.

Timney lived in Carsphad, three miles from St John's town of Dalry in a stone cottage adjacent to Hannah's house. The two of them argued regularly, and Hannah suspected Timney of stealing firewood. Timney also accused her husband of having an affair with Hannah.

On 13 January 1862, Hannah's brother Lockhart found her body on the floor and called the police. She had been beaten to death. A butcher's knife and a two-foot long iron fire poker, both covered in blood, were lying next to the body. Several witnesses said they had seen Mary Timney exiting Hannah's house holding a wooden mallet and with blood on her dress, and she was arrested. The mallet was found in her attic, wrapped in a bloodstained dress matching the description given by witnesses. Several items from Ann Hannah's kitchen were found in her house.

At her trial Timney claimed self-defence: she said that Hannah had attacked her during an argument about Hannah's refusal to lend her any money and she had defended herself using the objects to hand. She was convicted and sentenced to death by hanging. Upon hearing of the death sentence, she cried out "Oh, my Lord, dinna do that! Give me anything but that, let the Lord send for me!".

Timney's case became a cause célèbre due to her four young children. A petition for clemency signed by 3,000 people was submitted to Home Secretary Sir George Grey, but was rejected. Timney was hanged by William Calcraft at Buccleuch Street Prison in Dumfries on 29 April 1862.
