= Peter Manuel =

Scottish serial killer (1927–1958)

- 1958 mugshot of Manuel
- Born: Peter Thomas Anthony Manuel; 15 March 1927; The Bronx, New York City, U.S.
- Died: 11 July 1958 (aged 31); HMP Barlinnie, Glasgow, Scotland
- Other names: The Beast of Birkenshaw; The Bedroom Killer
- Status: Executed by hanging
- Motive: Sadism; Robbery; Control; Rape; Possible grandiosity
- Convictions: Capital murder (x6); Murder (x1); Theft by housebreaking (x3); Car theft (x1)
- Penalty: Death

Details
- Victims: 7 (convicted); 9 (alleged); 12 (claimed)
- Span of crimes: 2 January 1956 – 1 January 1958
- Country: Scotland: 7 (convicted); 1 (alleged); England: 1 (alleged)
- Date apprehended: 14 January 1958

Peter Thomas Anthony Manuel (15 March 1927 – 11 July 1958) was a Scottish serial killer known as the Beast of Birkenshaw and the Bedroom Killer who committed the murders of seven people across Lanarkshire, Scotland, between 1956 and 1958. He is also suspected of murdering two further victims—one in East Kilbride, Scotland and one in Edmundbyers, England—in 1956 and 1957 respectively.

Tried at the Glasgow High Court for the eight murders committed in Scotland, Manuel was convicted of seven of these crimes on 26 May 1958, with charges pertaining to his first alleged victim dismissed due to insufficient evidence. He did appeal his conviction, but his conviction was upheld on 24 June. He was hanged at HM Prison Barlinnie on 11 July.

Manuel became known as the "Beast of Birkenshaw" due to the name of the North Lanarkshire village where he lived at the time of his arrest and the proximity of his home to each of his known Scottish crime scenes; he became known as the "Bedroom Killer" because six of the seven victims he was convicted of killing were murdered in the bedrooms of their own homes.

== Early life ==
Peter Manuel was born in the Misericordia Hospital in the Bronx, New York City, on 15 March 1927, the second of three children born to Samuel and Bridget (née Greenan) Manuel. He had one older brother, James, and one younger sister, Theresa. The family were Scottish, and followed the Roman Catholic faith.

Manuel's parents were both working class; they had relocated from Scotland to the United States in the early 1920s in search of better employment—initially settling in New York, where Manuel's father worked in a department store. Shortly after Manuel's birth, the family relocated from New York to Detroit, Michigan, where Manuel's father found employment in a car factory and his mother employment as a domestic servant, although largely due to the Great Depression, the family relocated back to the United Kingdom in 1932. Initially, the family resided in Motherwell, although due to Samuel becoming unemployed in the mid-1930s, the family relocated to Coventry in the West Midlands of England.

Reportedly, Manuel was something of a misfit as a child, and his American accent and short stature occasionally made him a target for bullies. Although intelligent and an accomplished artist who aspired to become either a painter or an architect as a child, Manuel began committing crimes at an early age and developed a reputation as a troublesome child and a petty thief. The first crime Manuel is known to have committed occurred when he was nine years old, when he was arrested for breaking into a school. Shortly after his eleventh birthday, he stole the offertory from a local chapel. In October 1938, he appeared before a juvenile court for stealing from a shop. Five weeks later, Manuel committed his first known act of burglary, for which he was sent to an approved school in Suffolk.

=== Adolescence ===
Between the ages of twelve and eighteen, Manuel was frequently arrested for criminal offences—almost always burglary, robbery or theft—for which he was incarcerated at approved schools, borstals and, ultimately, prison, although he is not known to have exhibited any physical or sexual violence in these offences until he was aged fifteen. As a result, Manuel spent the majority of his teenage years in both English and, later, Scottish detainment facilities—his family having relocated back to Scotland from Coventry in 1941 shortly after a German airstrike upon the city destroyed their home. (Note: On at least eleven occasions while detained in borstals or approved schools, Manuel absconded from the facilities, although he was invariably re-apprehended.) The family initially relocated to Viewpark, North Lanarkshire before ultimately settling in the nearby village of Birkenshaw, where Manuel's father became a district councillor.

Manuel was unable to rejoin his family in Scotland as at the time of their relocation, he had been incarcerated for breaking into the house of a lone woman, whom he bludgeoned about the head with a hammer before stealing her purse. At the time of this offence, Manuel had absconded from borstal. Upon recapture, Manuel was detained at HM Prison Leeds. He was later transferred to an approved school in Yorkshire, from which he absconded in December 1942. Before his re-apprehension, he committed his first known sexual assault. In this instance, Manuel bludgeoned a housewife about the head with a blunt instrument before dragging her into woodland and attempting to rape her.

Following a brief period of employment at a fairground stall in Blackpool after his 1945 release from borstal, Manuel opted to relocate to Birkenshaw to live with his parents. He returned to Scotland in early 1946.

== Relocation to Lanarkshire ==
Within weeks of returning to Scotland in February 1946, Manuel was again arrested for breaking into a bungalow in the Sandyhills district of Glasgow. He would later be sentenced to one year's imprisonment after being convicted of fifteen separate charges of theft by housebreaking although while on bail for these offences, he beat and attempted to rape a pregnant woman in the presence of her three-year-old daughter in the Mount Vernon district of Glasgow. In separate instances days later, he sexually assaulted a young nurse and raped a housewife.

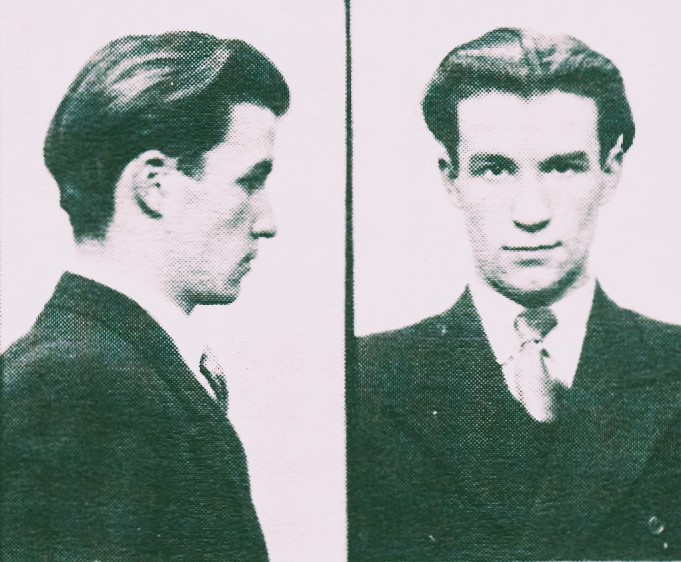
Manuel, pictured following his March 1946 arrest for housebreaking

Shortly after being convicted of multiple charges of housebreaking, Manuel was separately prosecuted for the rape he had committed while on bail. His trial was held at the Glasgow High Court. Manuel conducted his own defence at trial, but was sentenced to serve eight years' imprisonment on 25 June 1946. He served the majority of this sentence at HM Prison Peterhead, but was released in the autumn of 1952 and moved back into his parents' home. He was again arrested and imprisoned for housebreaking in April 1953, but was released in February 1954. Although Manuel obtained employment with British Railways shortly after his release from prison, he soon resumed committing acts of housebreaking.

While incarcerated within various English and Scottish detainment facilities, Manuel became proficient in several manual trades including woodwork, joinery and French polishing; he would occasionally find legitimate employment in professions requiring these honed skills, although few of his employment roles lasted longer than a few weeks and he would invariably revert to criminal activities within weeks or months of his release from any detainment. Although a pathological liar and something of a loner, Manuel did establish several contacts within Glasgow's criminal underworld following his family's return to Scotland, some of whom he colluded with to commit burglaries. Despite feeling a sense of belonging within Glasgow's criminal fraternity, he was viewed by many criminals and work colleagues alike as little more than a small-time crook and a fantasist.

=== Engagement ===
In the autumn of 1954, Manuel began dating a young bus conductress named Anna O'Hara, whom he met on the bus he took to work. Within months, and with the approval of O'Hara's parents, the two became engaged, with a wedding date set for 30 July 1955. Shortly before the wedding, O'Hara terminated their engagement upon being informed of Manuel's extensive history of criminal behaviour. Thereafter, Manuel is not known to have formed any serious relationships with women, and remained a bachelor living with his parents and older brother.

On the evening of what would have been Manuel's wedding day, he drank himself into a state of intoxication before attempting to rape and threatening to decapitate a 29-year-old woman at knifepoint in a rural field close to his parents' home. Fearing for her life, the woman did not resist the assault and attempted rape—at one point lying still with a knife to her throat after Manuel had forced her into woodland in response to a police search of the area following a resident reporting hearing a woman's screams.

The victim of this assault repeatedly conversed with Manuel throughout her ordeal, and eventually persuaded him to release her after falsely promising not to inform authorities. Days later, he was arrested and charged with rape. A psychological evaluation revealed him to be sane and fit to plead to the charge. He was brought to trial at the County Buildings in Airdrie in October that year. Manuel insisted on conducting his own defence, and successfully convinced the jury he and his victim had been lovers and that the charges had been brought out of spite following a heated argument. As such, the jury returned a verdict of not proven.

== Murders ==
Peter Manuel was convicted and executed for the murders of seven people, although he is strongly suspected of committing at least nine murders. Each of the murders for which he was executed were committed within a twenty-four mile (39 km) radius of the Scottish Lowlands and each within a travelling radius of his parents' Lanarkshire home. He is also suspected of committing one further murder within this geographical radius in January 1956, and a ninth murder in County Durham, England, in December 1957.

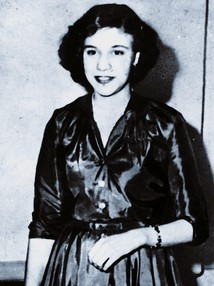
Anne Kneilands

=== Anne Kneilands ===
On the afternoon of 4 January 1956, a labourer discovered the bludgeoned and barefoot body of a blonde teenage girl lying face-down in a hollow known locally as Capelrig Copse in the Calderwood district of East Kilbride. The location was close to a golf course. Investigators discovered one of the victim's shoes embedded in the slope of a nearby ditch; the other was located on the other side of the ditch approximately seventy feet from her body. Footprints within the ditch where her shoes were located and across nearby fields—plus mud and human tissue located on barbed wire fences and a nearby gate—indicated the victim had been chased for at least 400 yards by her murderer before being caught by her assailant. Fragments of her skull and sections of brain tissue were located on the ground close to her body, indicating she had been felled by several blows to the head with a blunt instrument.

A post-mortem concluded the decedent had died at least thirty-six hours prior to the discovery of her body, and that she had died of extensive head injuries, with one particularly severe skull fracture having proved fatal. Although her undergarments were in disarray and her knickers missing, the girl had not been raped, although semen was discovered upon her clothing, indicating her murderer had ejaculated as he inflicted the injuries to her body.

The victim was quickly identified as Anne Kneilands, a 17-year-old machinist who was last seen alive by her siblings at 6:40 p.m. on 2 January walking from her home in the direction of a nearby farm where she intended to catch a bus to meet a young soldier she had begun dating several days previously with plans to attend a Hogmanay dance. Her boyfriend later informed police he had failed to keep their appointment, indicating Kneilands had been attacked as she returned home. Although door-to-door inquiries yielded no solid leads, a local man walking his dogs close to the golf course reported hearing a female "squeal cry ... 'Oh! Oh!'" shortly after 8:30 p.m. on the date of the murder, indicating Kneilands had likely died at this time.

At the time of this murder, Manuel was employed with the Scottish Gas Board, and had been performing maintenance work with colleagues at a nearby roadside. Manuel's foreman and colleagues had noted scratches on his nose and cheek on 3 January, which he had alternately claimed to have sustained either via his employment, or in a fight on New Year's Eve. Furthermore, police questioning of Manuel's employer revealed the scratches on Manuel's face were only evident after 2 January.

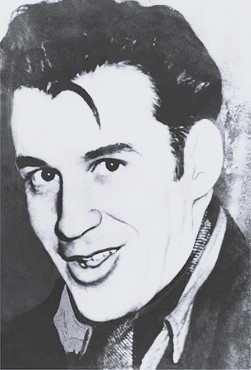
Manuel, pictured in January 1956

==== Questioning and release ====
Manuel was questioned by detectives on 12 January; he repeated his claim to have sustained the scratches to his face in a fight on New Year's Eve, adding that he had not left his home on the evening of 2 January. Several items of his clothing were confiscated for forensic examination, although these garments failed to yield any physical evidence connecting him to the murder. Nonetheless, a Detective Chief Inspector William Muncie did note a maroon jacket and a pair of grey flannel trousers Manuel was known to frequently wear were not present in the household. Questioned as to the whereabouts of these garments, Manuel claimed to have given the items away.

Manuel's parents were also questioned as to their son's whereabouts on 2 January; his father insisted he had been at home at the time of the murder, whereas his mother claimed she could not recall his whereabouts. Although Manuel remained a suspect in Kneilands' murder, no formal charges were brought against him due to insufficient evidence.

=== Marion Watt, Vivienne Watt, and Margaret Brown ===
Manuel is not known to have killed again until the early hours of 17 September 1956, when he shot to death 45-year-old Marion Hunter Watt, her 16-year-old daughter Vivienne Isabella, and her 42-year-old sister Margaret Hunter Brown in the Watt household in the South Lanarkshire town of Burnside. Each woman had been murdered with a .38 calibre revolver that he had recently purchased from a criminal acquaintance for £5 (the equivalent of approximately £110 as of 2026) and the murders are known to have occurred sometime after 11:40 p.m. when a 17-year-old friend and neighbour of Vivienne's named Deanna Maria Valente left the Watt household to return to her own home.

Upon breaking into the house via shattering a small panel of glass and unlocking the front door, Manuel first observed the two adult women sleeping in the master bedroom before crossing the hallway and entering Vivienne's bedroom. According to Manuel, Vivienne "woke up and sat up" as he entered her bedroom; she was briefly knocked unconscious before her hands were bound behind her back. He then returned to the master bedroom and shot the two adult women to death at point-blank range before returning to Vivienne's bedroom and fatally shooting her close to her left eye. Vivienne was still alive when the family housekeeper, Helen Collison, arrived at the household at 8:45 a.m. and discovered the crime scene, but died of her wounds seconds after Collison entered her bedroom and rushed to her aid. Although Vivienne's bra had been torn from her body, none of the victims had been sexually assaulted, and a medical examiner would also determine Vivienne had been a virgin.

"I broke into the house by breaking a glass panel in the front door. I then went in and opened a bedroom door; there were two people in the bed. I then went into the other room; there was a girl there—she woke up and sat up. I hit her on the chin and knocked her out ... I tied her hands, then went back to the other room [and] shot the two people there. Then I heard someone making a noise in the other room ... the girl had got loose. We struggled, then I threw her on the bed and shot her."

— Peter Manuel, confessing to the murders at the Watt household (January 1958).

Later the same day, Manuel travelled to Glasgow and dropped the gun used in these murders from a suspension bridge into the River Clyde.

Police were unable to determine an actual motive for the murders, as no money or personal possessions had been stolen from the household, although—as in the case of two recent local housebreakings—several tins of food had been opened and the contents scattered over the floors of the bungalow.

==== Police suspects ====
Suspicion for the murders quickly fell upon Peter Manuel, who by 1956 was well known to local police for his criminal activities, having amassed an extensive criminal record for offences including housebreaking, various forms of larceny, and unlawful wounding. By the early hours of 18 September, Detective Chief Superintendent James Hendry had obtained a warrant to search his parents' household. No physical evidence was found to link Manuel to the murders or the recent local housebreakings. As such, police were unable to arrest him for the crimes.

At the time of the murders of his family, William Watt had been eight days into a solo fishing trip in the coastal village of Ardrishaig, some 93 miles (150 km) from Burnside, residing in the Cairnbaan Hotel in Lochgilphead on the far side of Loch Fyne. He had last spoken with his wife and daughter via telephone at approximately 10:30 p.m. on the evening prior to the murders. Although the proprietress of the Cairnbaan Hotel informed police Watt had been at the premises at midnight on the 16th and had been served breakfast the following morning, a senior crew member aboard the Renfrew Ferry claimed to have transported Watt and his vehicle across the River Clyde in the early hours of 17 September (although the direction of the ferry's travel would not have been the most direct route from Ardrishaig to Burnside). A motorist also claimed to have passed a man matching his description close to Loch Lomond. Both witnesses picked Watt out of an identity parade. He was remanded in custody at HM Prison Barlinnie on suspicion of murdering his family on 27 September, being suspected of staging a break-in to his own house in order to commit the crimes, with his fishing trip a pre-planned alibi. (Note: Police were unable to determine any conclusive motive which might have led Watt to murder his family, although they did discover he had a conducted at least one affair throughout the course of his marriage.)

==== Developments and release ====
Six months prior to the murders, Manuel had been bailed upon a charge of robbing the canteen of a colliery office in the town of Blantyre. On 2 October, he was tried before a judge at Hamilton Sheriff Court and sentenced to eighteen months' imprisonment; he was also detained at HM Prison Barlinnie. Six days later, Manuel contacted Watt, claiming to know the identity of the perpetrator of the crimes and offering to help exonerate him. He also wrote a letter to Watt's solicitor, Lawrence Dowdall, the same day, requesting he represent him in an appeal against his own burglary conviction and offering to help provide evidence "to our mutual advantage" to disprove the case against Watt if he agreed to do so.

On 10 October, Dowdall interviewed Manuel, who provided details of the Watt murders, including the layout of the household, which he claimed had been given to him by the murderer, whom he initially refused to name but later claimed to be a friend and criminal acquaintance of his named Charles Tallis. Manuel claimed to have had no direct involvement in the murders himself, but admitted to having disposed of the firearm used in the murders at Tallis's request, adding the revolver was a .38 Webley with a missing lanyard ring. Dowdall—convinced Manuel was the actual perpetrator—divulged his suspicions to the authorities. Detectives did subsequently attempt to interview Manuel, but he refused to cooperate with their inquiries.

Watt was released from custody in December 1956 after police were unable to find any firm evidence linking him to the crimes. Manuel was released from prison on 30 November 1957. He again returned to living with his parents.

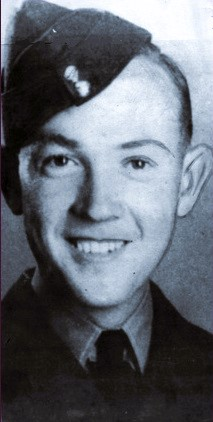
Sydney Dunn

=== Sydney Dunn ===
On 6 December 1957, Manuel travelled via train from Birkenshaw to North East England to attend a job interview at a Newcastle upon Tyne engineering firm. Prior to returning to Lanarkshire, he is believed to have shot and killed a 36-year-old taxi driver named Sydney John Dunn, who was last seen alive by a colleague at Newcastle railway station at 4:30 a.m. on 8 December, driving from the station with a fare.

Dunn's body was discovered upon a rural moorland road approximately two miles (3.2 km) from the village of Edmundbyers in County Durham fourteen hours later. He had been shot once in the back of the head at point-blank range with a .38 calibre revolver before his body was dragged approximately 140 yards from his taxi, which had been either pushed or driven into a gully after the vehicle's headlights and interior lights had been smashed. Dunn's throat had also been cut and his personal possessions were strewn about the crime scene. Extensive bloodstains found upon and around the vehicle's steering wheel and dashboard strongly suggested Dunn's throat had been cut after his head had fallen onto the steering wheel after his murderer had shot him in the head and prior to his body being dragged from the vehicle.

By the time of the discovery of Dunn's body, Manuel had returned from England to Lanarkshire, although he had still been in North East England at the estimated time Dunn's murder had occurred. (Note: Some doubts remain as to Manuel's actual culpability in Dunn's murder. The rural location of the crime has led some to speculate the perpetrator had been a local person. Furthermore, although two witnesses who spoke to the individual whom Dunn accepted as a fare shortly before his murder picked out Manuel at an identity parade, one of these individuals initially claimed that the murderer had a local accent. When it was suggested to this individual that the perpetrator may have arrived in Newcastle upon an Irish boat train, he changed his account and claimed that the man had an Irish accent, whereas Manuel had acquired a Scottish accent by 1957.)

=== Isabelle Cooke ===
On 28 December 1957, Manuel travelled by bus from Birkenshaw to Mount Vernon. Having crossed a railway bridge in the direction of Shettleston, he encountered a 17-year-old Sunday school teacher named Isabelle Wallace Cooke, who had left her home to go to a dance at Uddingston Grammar School, having dressed for the occasion in a new fur stole and earrings shaped like the Eiffel Tower. She was carrying her dancing shoes, handbag, and a fan.

Isabelle Cooke

According to Manuel's subsequent confession, he "grabbed [Cooke] and dragged her into a field on the same side as Rylands Riding School" before forcing her to accompany him further away from the road. After throwing Cooke's handbag into a pond, he attempted to force the girl to accompany him further across the field, although Cooke—by this stage hysterical—began to scream, whereupon Manuel "tore off her clothes, tied something around her neck and choked her" as he raped her. (Note: Investigators would later determine Manuel had strangled Cooke with a length of blue ribbon she had worn. Her scarf had also been forced into her mouth to stifle her screams.) He then carried her body into a freshly-ploughed field upon Burntbroom Farm and buried her in a shallow grave with a workman's shovel he retrieved from close to the railway bridge.

Cooke was reported missing by her parents the following morning. Her clothes, shoes and personal possessions were discovered scattered in various locations, including a flooded colliery shaft and the Rotten Calder. Many of these items were recovered over the following days, although her body remained undiscovered.

As with Dunn's murder twenty days earlier, Cooke's disappearance was not initially connected to Manuel; however, her disappearance was tentatively linked to the murder of Anne Kneilands.

=== Peter, Doris, and Michael Smart ===
In the predawn hours of 1 January 1958, Manuel broke into a bungalow on Sheepburn Road, Uddingston. Discovering a middle-aged couple named Peter and Doris Smart asleep in their bed, he shot both to death with a pistol he had recently purchased from a criminal acquaintance before entering the bedroom of their 12-year-old son, Michael, and fatally shooting the boy once in the head. He then stole all the money he could find in the household, including several brand new £5 banknotes from Peter Smart's wallet. Hours later, Manuel travelled to Glasgow to dispose of the gun in the River Clyde at Glasgow Green. The firearm was thrown into the water from King's Bridge. Several days later, a neighbour noticed the garage doors to the property were open and the family's Austin A35 missing from the property. (Note: On 2 January, Manuel is known to have given a lift to a young police officer while driving the Smarts' vehicle. This officer had been investigating the disappearance of Isabelle Cooke. Upon learning this fact, Manuel informed the officer that he felt that the police were not searching in the correct areas for Cooke.)

Police would later discover that Manuel had repeatedly stealthily entered the Smart household in the days immediately following the murders, stealing personal possessions, eating leftovers from the family Hogmanay meal, watching television and even feeding the family cat before opening several tins of salmon, which he left to spoil in the family kitchenette.

The bodies of the Smarts would remain undiscovered until 6 January, when two colleagues of Peter Smart reported to police he had failed to arrive at work and they been unable to contact him. Police broke into the bungalow and discovered the bodies at 11 a.m. after learning the family car had recently been found abandoned on a street in the Gorbals. Ballistic analysis would determine that all three decedents had been shot once in the head with a Beretta pistol, and the circumstances of the crime led detectives to conclude the perpetrator had almost certainly been responsible for the murders at the Watt household fifteen months previously.

==== Investigative developments ====
Although neighbours of the Smarts informed police they had assumed nothing was untoward in the Smart household as they had observed curtains opened and closed and lights switched on and off in the days prior to the discovery of their bodies, the level of decomposition of the bodies, plus unopened mail postmarked between 31 December and 3 January indicated the family had died on New Year's Day. Via tracing the family's movements on 31 December, investigators discovered that Peter Smart had withdrawn £35 in £5 notes from the Parkhead branch of the Commercial Bank of Scotland on the afternoon prior to his murder. Staff at the bank were able to provide investigators with the consecutive serial numbers of these notes. He was last seen alive at approximately 9:40 p.m. leaving a local pub.

Shortly after the discovery of the bodies of the Smart family, police received an anonymous tip that although Manuel—who lived within half a mile (0.80 km) of the Smart household—had been without cash on New Year's Eve, he had been spending extravagantly in the following days. Routine checks in several east-end Glasgow pubs Manuel was known to frequent revealed he had spent a lot of money in the previous week, with patrons and staff alike remarking to investigators how lavishly Manuel had spent money, including one instance approximately twenty-four hours after the Smart murders in which he had spent over £8 17s on drinks and cigarettes (the equivalent of approximately £170 as of 2026) for a gathering of in-laws and friends in which he had paid from a roll of newly issued banknotes. The serial numbers upon several of the £5 banknotes he had used to pay for drinks were recovered and proved to be a precise match with those issued to Peter Smart on New Year's Eve.

== Arrest ==
By 13 January 1958, investigators had gathered enough physical and circumstantial evidence to arrest Manuel for the murder of the Smarts and to additionally charge him with breaking and entering into the Uddingston home of a family named McMunn in the early hours of 4 January. (Note: Manuel fled from the McMunn residence after the father of the household, John McMunn, duped him into believing he had a firearm as Manuel entered their bedroom by saying to his wife, "Who is it? Where's the gun?" to which his wife replied, "Here it is.") He was arrested at 6:45 a.m. the following day.

As an officer named Andrew Stuart recited the arrest warrant to Manuel's father, Manuel became verbally abusive. Informed he was to be taken to Bellshill police station for further questioning, Manuel replied: "You haven't found anything yet. You can't take me!" Shortly thereafter, he voluntarily left his home in the company of the officers to face formal questioning at Lanarkshire police headquarters. As a search of the property revealed a Kodak camera and an expensive pair of wool-lined gloves known to have been recently stolen from a house in Mount Vernon in Manuel's parents' bedroom, his father was also arrested and charged with theft and reset after claiming he had recently bought the goods at a local market.

In custody, Manuel denied having committed the murders at the Smart residence. He admitted having acquired a considerable sum of money on New Year's Day, but insisted he had obtained this money legitimately at a Glasgow betting shop, with the £5 notes he had been spending having been given to him by the betting shop owner, Samuel McKay. McKay denied these claims and also informed police he had seen Manuel with a Beretta pistol the previous month. At 11:10 that evening, Manuel was formally charged both with murdering the Smart family and with the recent housebreaking in Mount Vernon from where he had acquired the camera and goods recovered from his home.

=== Confession ===
At 12:30 p.m. the following day, Manuel requested to speak with a senior investigating officer; his request was granted and two senior officers spoke with him that afternoon. Manuel insisted to both officers that his father held no knowledge of any of his criminal activities, and offered to confess to the murders of the Smart family and reveal the location he had buried Isabelle Cooke in exchange for his father's release, stating: "Bring my father and mother here. I will speak to them with you present, and once I have told them myself, and made a clean breast of it ... I will take you to where the Cooke girl is buried." He was then led to a superintendent's office, where he wrote a letter addressed to Inspector Robert McNeill, in which he outlined his intention to "clear up" crimes he had committed in return for his father's release from custody, adding "the crimes I refer to are crimes of homicide" before specifically naming each victim he had murdered in Lanarkshire over the previous two years. Although informed his offer would need to be approved by higher authorities, Manuel immediately began providing verbal confessions to each of his crimes.

In a meeting with both his parents and detectives later that afternoon, Manuel first asked why his father had claimed to investigators he had bought the stolen gloves and camera recovered from their household himself before stating: "There is no future for me. I have done some terrible things." This statement prompted his mother to reply: "Tell us everything, Peter. Tell us the truth." Manuel then verbally confessed to the eight murders he had committed in Lanarkshire over the previous two years. He was detained in custody pending preliminary hearings.

=== Further discoveries ===
In the early hours of the following day, Manuel led investigators to the location where he had buried the body of Isabelle Cooke, remarking to investigators after arriving at the location: "This is the place. In fact, I think I'm standing on her now." After also revealing where he had concealed one of Cooke's dancing shoes beneath a pile of bricks, he was driven back to police headquarters, where he compiled a five-page written confession to each of the murders he had committed in Lanarkshire. In each case, Manuel provided corroborating details of the crime either previously withheld from the public, or which only the perpetrator could have known.

Over the following days, Manuel led detectives to the precise locations in the River Clyde where he had thrown the guns used to murder the Watt and Smart families, and to a piece of angle iron he had thrown into the Rotten Calder after the murder of Anne Kneilands. Both firearms and the section of iron were retrieved by underwater units. Subsequent ballistic testing of the firearms confirmed Manuel's statements the weapons had been used to murder the Watt and Smart families.

== Formal murder charges ==
On 19 January, Manuel—by this stage represented by solicitors John Ferns and Ian Docherty—was additionally charged with the murder of Isabelle Cooke. Two days later, he was interviewed by officers from Durham Constabulary with regards to the murder of Sydney Dunn. By 16 February, he had been formally charged with nine murders—eight committed within Lanarkshire, and one in Northern England. He was indicted for each of the murders committed in Scotland on 25 March.

Prior to trial, Manuel was assessed by several eminent psychiatrists and neurologists to determine whether he was sane; all ruled Manuel sane and fit to plead.

== Trial ==
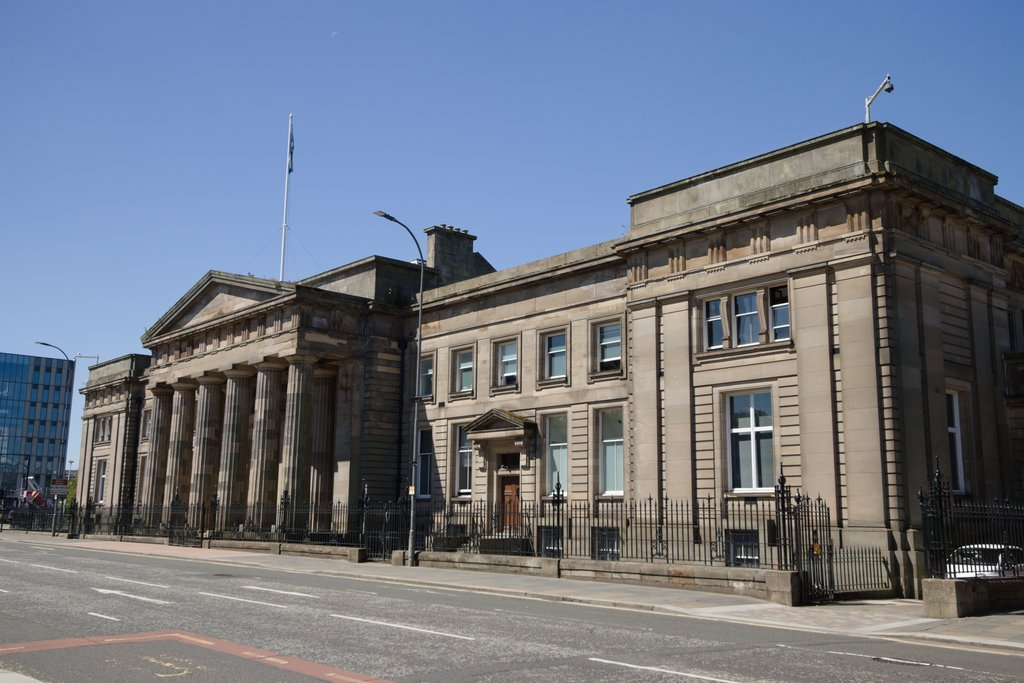
The Glasgow High Court. Manuel was brought to trial at this location on 12 May 1958.

Manuel was brought to trial for eight murders, three charges of theft by housebreaking, and one charge of car theft, at the Glasgow High Court on 12 May 1958. He was tried before Lord Cameron. The chief prosecutor was Gordon Gillies Q.C., who was assisted by Ranald Sutherland Q.C.; Manuel was defended by Harald Leslie Q.C., William Robertson Grieve Q.C., and Malcolm Morison Q.C. He pleaded not guilty to all charges.

The first two days of the trial were devoted to the prosecution outlining each of the murders and housebreakings, the physical and circumstantial evidence linking Manuel to the crimes, and his criminal past. On the third day, William Watt's solicitor, Lawrence Dowdall, outlined his conversations with Manuel inside HM Prison Barlinnie, his detailed knowledge of the murders committed at the Watt residence, and of his conviction Manuel had been the perpetrator of the murders.

On 15 May, William Watt testified on behalf of the prosecution with regard to the murders of his family; Watt outlined the circumstances surrounding the murders, his subsequent arrest, his release from custody having been discounted as a suspect, and—via personal endeavours—his gradual conviction that Manuel was responsible for the crimes. Although subjected to extensive cross-examination by William Grieve, Watt denied any culpability in the crimes. Watt's testimony was followed by that of Charles Tallis, whom Manuel alleged had confessed to having murdered the family to him in a case of mistaken identity after entering the Watt household believing the home had been occupied by their adjacent neighbours, the Valentes, having seen Deanna Valente with Vivienne Watt in the home shortly before the murders. (Note: Manuel alleged at trial that Tallis had intended to break into the Valente household due to his belief a sum of money rumored to be approximately £5,000 had been kept in a safe within the Valente household.) Tallis admitted to having been somewhat acquainted with Manuel, but denied any culpability in the crimes. Furthermore, Tallis was able to produce witnesses confirming he had been at a friend's wedding in Hamilton in the days immediately prior to the murders and further stated that he had not seen Manuel until the evening after murders when, over drinks, Manuel had seemed fixated with discussing the ongoing Suez Crisis.

The defence began presenting their case before the jury on the seventh day of the trial. The first witness summoned was Inspector Robert McNeill, who was questioned by Harald Leslie pertaining to the written and verbal statements made by Manuel following his arrest and who alleged that each of his client's confessions had been obtained under duress, stating: "I'm suggesting that the accused was broken down. Can you account for the position any other way?" McNeill denied each of Leslie's allegations, adding police were unaccountable "for the accused's actions at all".

Following McNeill's testimony, and immediately prior to the formal introduction of Manuel's confessions into evidence, his defence counsel sought to have his confessions ruled inadmissible as evidence. As such, the judge declared a brief recess and briefly excused the jury from the courtroom as he considered the motion. He ruled to allow the confessions submitted as evidence on 21 May. That afternoon, McNeill read Manuel's confessions to the court, emphasising that prior to Manuel writing his confessions, he had informed him he did not need to provide any written confessions and that Manuel had dismissed his offer of legal aid.

=== Dismissal of lawyers ===
On 22 May, Manuel sacked his lawyers and insisted on conducting his own defence. He reiterated his lawyers' previous assertions throughout the judge's imposed recess that his confessions had been extracted under extreme duress and were thus legally invalid and presented a series of unverifiable alibis as to his alleged whereabouts on the dates of each of the murders. Manuel also asserted that the police were attempting to frame him for each of the murders and attempted to discredit each witness he cross-examined. Nonetheless, he did admit to having entered the Smart household on 3 January with a key he claimed had been given to him by Peter Smart, only to discover the occupants dead, with the Beretta lying across Peter's chest. According to Manuel, he—realising he was in a precarious predicament—had wiped several surfaces within the property to remove his fingerprints after discovering the occupants dead in their bedrooms before leaving the property, later disposing of the pistol in the River Clyde. He also admitted to knowledge of the stolen property recovered from his home on 14 January, which he alleged he had illicitly purchased from tinkers in a pub shortly after Christmas 1957.

"Do you remember that you said to me that when you shot your little girl it would have required very little to turn the gun on yourself? ... Do you remember describing to me the manner in which you killed your wife?"

— Peter Manuel, subjecting William Watt to cross-examination on 23 May 1958.

==== Recall of witnesses ====
Manuel's decision to conduct his own defence resulted in several individuals who had previously testified being recalled to face questioning by Manuel himself. One of these individuals was William Watt, whom he subjected to intense cross-examination on 23 May and whom Manuel alleged had confessed to him that he had murdered his wife, daughter and sister-in-law. Watt again denied these allegations. Also recalled to court and subjected to cross-examination were Inspector McNeill and an Inspector Goodall, whom Manuel alleged had driven him to the field where he had buried Isabelle Cooke in the early hours of 16 January before McNeill had pointed to a wall at the perimeter of the field close to Cooke's grave and stated: "This is where you were going to bury Isabelle Cooke, isn't it?" Both men denied the allegations and stated he had shown them the location of the grave himself.

McNeill was also questioned by Manuel as to why he, as opposed to William Watt, was rapidly considered a suspect in the murders at the Watt household. In response, McNeill replied: "Do you really want me to answer that question? For it would not be in your best interests." Manuel insisted his question be answered, whereupon McNeill outlined police knowledge of his extensive criminal record including numerous arrests for housebreaking in addition to his habit of pouring tins of food over the floors of properties he burgled—as had happened at the Watt household.

On the morning of 26 May, Manuel's mother, Bridget, testified on his behalf. She testified that upon meeting her son and husband the day after their arrest, Manuel had read from a written statement in which he referenced "clearing up unsolved crimes in Lanarkshire", adding police had stated "You know what you have to do, Peter" prior to his reading the statement. Although Bridget Manuel conceded to a question from her son that this statement from police had "prompted" his recital, she also conceded upon cross-examination he had not recited any actual details of the murders for which he was being tried. Manuel then called his father to testify on his behalf. Although Samuel Manuel did attempt to provide alibis for his son, corroborate his assertions, and insinuate that criminal acquaintances of his may have been responsible for the murders, he repeatedly faltered during cross-examination.

=== Closing arguments ===
Manuel's trial lasted fourteen days, and saw 169 witnesses summoned to testify and 158 exhibits introduced into evidence. On 26 May, both the prosecution and Peter Manuel delivered their closing arguments before the jury retired to consider their verdict. Gordon Gillies first delivered the closing argument on behalf of the prosecution. Gillies outlined the ample physical and circumstantial evidence against Manuel in each of the tried murder, theft and housebreaking cases before alluding to Manuel's inference the police, with assistance from several of the prosecution witnesses, being involved in a conspiracy to frame him for each crime as being ludicrous. Gillies also poured scorn on his claims as to William Watt and Peter Smart having murdered their families—adding neither man had a motive to do so.

Upon conclusion of Gillies' closing argument, Manuel spoke for two-and-a-half hours in his own defence. He primarily attempted to cast a reasonable doubt in the jurors' minds as to his culpability in each charge while asserting that the police had colluded to frame him for each murder for which he stood trial and that various prosecution witnesses had either lied or were mistaken in their testimony. Manuel repeated his allegations that his written confessions had been extracted via threats which had made him fear for both his own safety and that of his family, and reiterated his earlier claims that William Watt had murdered his family and that Peter Smart had bought a gun off him prior to killing his wife and son in a murder–suicide. He concluded his closing argument shortly after midday.

== Conviction ==
Upon completion of both counsels' closing arguments, Lord Cameron delivered his final instructions to the jury. He remarked how Manuel had presented his own defence "with a skill which is quite remarkable" before instructing the jury to consider whether Manuel suffered from a "mental unsoundness bordering on but not amounting to insanity" within their deliberations and stating that, if deemed mentally unstable, Manuel should be found guilty of culpable homicide as opposed to capital murder.

The jury retired to deliberate their verdict shortly after 2:20 p.m. They would deliberate for less than two-and-a-half hours before announcing that they had reached their verdicts: Manuel was found guilty of six charges of capital murder and—in relation to Isabelle Cooke—one charge of non-capital murder. However, due to the lack of hard evidence linking him to the crime, Lord Cameron had instructed the jury to acquit Manuel of the murder of Anne Kneilands prior to their deliberations. (Note: Contemporary Scottish law required corroborative evidence to substantiate Manuel's confession to Kneilands' murder. No such evidence existed to support his confession.) He was also found guilty of two of the three charges of theft by housebreaking and the theft of the Smarts' vehicle. On one charge of theft by housebreaking dating from December 1957, the jury returned a verdict of not proven.

Manuel remained silent as Lord Cameron donned his formal black cap and sentenced him to death. An initial execution date was set for 19 June. He was held in a condemned cell at HMP Barlinnie, to await execution.

=== Appeal ===
Manuel did appeal against his conviction. His appeal was heard before Lord Justice General Clyde, Lord Carmont, and Lord Sorn at the High Court of Justiciary on 24 June 1958. His appeal contended the trial judge's decision to allow his written confessions to be submitted into evidence after the statements had been obtained in relation to an agreement for his father to be released from custody amounted to inducement and thus should have amounted to his confessions being ruled inadmissible as evidence. His appeal was rejected, with Lord Justice General Clyde ruling the presiding judge had been justified in allowing the confessions submitted into evidence. Manuel's execution date was rescheduled for 11 July.

"From 6 a.m. the prisoner smoked continuosly and talked freely about general subjects [and] about a visit from his brother last night .... He was obviously under an immense emotional strain, but in all respects remained calm, composed and quite cheerful to the end."

— The final entry within Manuel's suicide watch journal, as recorded via protocol by prison staff, c. 8 a.m. 11 July 1958.

== Execution ==
Peter Manuel was hanged on the gallows at HMP Barlinnie at 8:01 a.m. on 11 July 1958. His executioner was Harry Allen, and his last meal consisted of fish, chips, tomatoes and a cup of tea. Reportedly, fewer than a dozen people stood outside the prison gates to protest his execution. His body was later buried within the confines of the prison.

The last family member to visit Manuel prior to his execution was his older brother, James, who later remarked that on the evening prior to his execution, his brother had observed confession and Holy Communion within an unoccupied condemned cell adjacent to his own, and that he had "shaved, washed and combed his hair" prior to his visit. In reference to his impending execution, Manuel had told his brother, "I'm not afraid" before he had replied, "Goodbye, Peter. Bless you."

Minutes prior to his execution, Manuel drank a customary glass of brandy before shaking hands with the warden, whom he calmly informed he was ready to die and to "get [his execution] over with". His last spoken words are reported to have been: "Turn up the wireless, and I'll go quietly."

== Aftermath ==
Peter Manuel was the third-to-last criminal to be executed in Scotland prior to the abolition of capital punishment in the United Kingdom in 1965. (Note: The two criminals to be executed in Scotland following Manuel's execution and prior to the abolition of capital punishment in the United Kingdom were Anthony Miller, who was executed at HMP Barlinnie in December 1960, and Henry John Burnett, who was executed at HM Prison Aberdeen in August 1963.)

In the weeks prior to his execution, Manuel confessed to having committed three further murders. One of these victims, Ellen Carlin (28), had been strangled with a ligature in Pimlico, London, on 6 September 1954; the other victims he named as 48-year-old Ellen Petrie and 55-year-old Anne Steele. Petrie had been fatally stabbed in the leg close to a baker's shop in West George Lane, Glasgow, on 15 June 1956; Steele had been discovered bludgeoned to death with a poker in her flat in Aberfoyle Street, Glasgow, on 11 January 1956.

In each instance, investigators question the sincerity of Manuel's claims. Moreover, in one instance, he had been incarcerated at the estimated time of the murder. In the case of Ellen Carlin, investigators strongly believe the victim had been murdered by an American serviceman, who had been seen with Carlin shortly before her murder.

Manuel never confessed to, and was never tried for, the murder of Sydney Dunn as the crime had occurred in a different legal jurisdiction; however, had the Scottish High Court of Justiciary upheld Manuel's appeal, officers from Durham Constabulary had been waiting to arrest and formally charge him with this murder.

Seventeen days after Manuel was hanged, a coroner's jury in Newcastle concluded he had murdered Dunn after two fellow taxi drivers, Thomas Green and Albert Younger, both positively identified Manuel as the man they had seen enter Dunn's taxi shortly before his murder. In addition, a distinctive button and yellow fibres found in Dunn's taxi proved a precise forensic match to a brown suit Manuel had worn when he had travelled to England to attend a job interview two days prior to Dunn's murder. When recovered, the jacket had been missing one button. Furthermore, traces of grass and vegetation found in the turn-ups of a pair of trousers owned by Manuel precisely matched the moorland vegetation at the crime scene.

Inspector Robert McNeill, to whom Manuel offered to confess to his murders in exchange for his father's release from custody, later became a chief constable in the county of Caithness. William Watt later remarried; his second marriage produced no children.

== Media ==
=== Literature ===
- Bingham, John; Muncie, William (1973). The Hunting Down of Peter Manuel, Glasgow Multiple Murderer. New York: Macmillan Publishers. ISBN 978-0-333-13664-5.
- Hall, Angus (1976). Crimes of Horror. London: Hamlyn Publishing. pp. 45–53. ISBN 978-1-850-51170-0.
- Jessel, David; Wilson, Colin (1990). "Murder Casebook, Investigations into the Ultimate Crime – Glasgow's Multiple Killer". Murder Casebook (26). Marshall Cavendish. ISBN 978-0-748-51426-7.
- MacLeod, Hector; MacLeod, Malcolm (2009). Peter Manuel, Serial Killer. Edinburgh: Mainstream Publishing Company, Ltd. ISBN 978-1-845-96397-2.
- Nicol, Allan M. (2008). Manuel: Scotland's First Serial Killer. Edinburgh: Black & White Publishing. ISBN 978-1-845-02241-9.
- Williams, Paul (1994). "Eight Times a Murderer". Real-Life Crimes (80). London, England: Eaglemoss Publications Ltd.: 1760–1768. ISBN 978-1-858-75014-9.
- Wilson, John Gray (1959). The Trial of Peter Manuel: The Man who Talked Too Much. London: Secker & Warburg. ISBN 978-3-540-90347-5.

=== Television ===
- Peter Manuel: The End of Evil?. Directed by Paul Tucker, this 46-minute documentary was first broadcast in September 2008.
- Inside the Mind of a Psychopath. Commissioned by BBC Scotland. This 55-minute documentary was first broadcast in February 2009 and features a recorded interview with Manuel.
- In Plain Sight. Commissioned by ITV. This three-part true crime drama miniseries focusing on the life and crimes of Peter Manuel was first broadcast in December 2016. Martin Compston is cast as Manuel.
- Murder Maps S04E01 "The Beast of Birkenshaw" (2019), produced by 3DD Productions and presented by Nicholas Day.

== See also ==
- Capital punishment in the United Kingdom
- Control (psychology) – How a person regulates themselves or wishes to regulate their environment
- HM Prison Barlinnie
- List of serial killers by number of victims
- List of serial killers in the United Kingdom
- Murder (Abolition of Death Penalty) Act 1965 – Act of the Parliament of the United Kingdom
- Narcissistic personality – Personality disorder
- Psychopathy – Personality construct
- Thrill killing – Murder motivated by sheer excitement

== Works cited and further reading ==
- Bailey, Brian J. (2010). Hangman: From Ketch to Pierrepoint - 300 Years of Execution. Pennsylvania: True Crime Publishing. ISBN 978-0-863-69623-7.
- Blake, Hamilton (2023). Scotland's Serial Killers. London: Headline Publishing Group. ISBN 978-3-757-55561-0.
- Blundell, Nigel (1996). The Encyclopedia of Serial Killers. London: Promotional Reprint Company Ltd. ISBN 1-856-48328-2.
- Boar, Roger; Blundell, Nigel (1991). Crooks, Crime and Corruption. Dorchester, Dorset: Dorset Press. ISBN 978-0-880-29615-1.
- Cawthorne, Nigel (1999). The World's Greatest Serial Killers. London: Chancellor Press. ISBN 978-0-753-70089-1.
- Dobbs, Gary (2020). A Date with the Hangman: A History of Capital Punishment in Britain. Philadelphia: Pen & Sword Books Ltd. ISBN 978-1-526-76740-0.
- Fido, Martin (1995). Twentieth-century Murder: A Year-by-year Account of the World's Most Pitiless Crimes. London: Bracken Books. ISBN 978-1-858-91390-2.
- Fido, Martin (2001). A History of British Serial Killing: How Britain's Most Famous Serial Killers Were Identified, Caught and Convicted. London: Carlton Books. ISBN 978-1-842-22204-1.
- Fielding, Steven (2008). The Executioner's Bible. London: John Blake Publishing. ISBN 978-1-843-58696-8.
- Frasier, David K. (2024). Murder Cases of the Twentieth Century: Biographies and Bibliographies of 280 Convicted Or Accused Killers. North Carolina: McFarland & Company Inc. ISBN 978-1-476-60808-2.
- Gaute, J. H. H.; Odell, Robin (1991). The New Murderers' Who's Who. Dorchester, Dorset: Dorset Press. ISBN 978-0-880-29582-6.
- Gordon, R. Michael (2018). Murder Files from Scotland Yard and the Black Museum. North Carolina: Exposit Publishing. ISBN 978-1-476-67254-0.
- Gribble, Leonard R. (1977). Compelled to Kill. London: Long Publishing. ISBN 978-0-091-29010-8.
- Hamilton, Ian Robertson (1990). A Touch of Treason. Scalasig: House of Lochar. ISBN 978-0-948-40345-3.
- Joyce, James Avery (1961). The Right to Life: A World View of Capital Punishment. New York: AMS Press, Inc. ISBN 978-0-404-62422-4.
- Knox, William (1968). Court of Murder: Famous Trials at Glasgow High Court. London: John Long Ltd. ISBN 978-0-090-86150-7.
- Lane, Brian (1991). The Murder Guide to Great Britain. London: Robinson Publishing Ltd. ISBN 1-854-87083-1.
- Lane, Brian (1995). Chronicle of 20th Century Murder. Wiltshire: Select Editions. ISBN 978-0-425-14649-1.
- Lane, Brian; Gregg, Wilfred (1992). The Encyclopedia of Serial Killers. London: Headline Publishing Group. ISBN 978-0-747-23731-0.
- Lindsay, Maurice (1981). Portrait of Glasgow. London: Hale Publishing. ISBN 978-0-709-18872-8.
- Lucas, Norman (1974). The Sex Killers. London: W. H. Allen & Co. ISBN 978-0-491-01481-6.
- Lustgarten, Edgar (1968). The Business of Murder. London: George G. Harrap and Co. ISBN 978-0-245-58691-0.
- MacKay, Donald M. (2015). Scotland's Hanged: 1946-1963. Glasgow: Glasgow Cross Press. ISBN 978-0-747-23731-0.
- Muncie, William (1979). The Crime Pond: Memoirs of William Muncie, Formerly Assistant Chief Constable, Strathclyde Police. Edinburgh: Chambers Publishing. ISBN 978-0-550-20353-3.
- Nash, Jay Robert (2004). The Great Pictorial History of World Crime. London: Rowan & Littlefield. ISBN 978-1-461-71215-2.
- Powell, Gary (2018). Convicted: Landmark Cases in British Criminal History. Stroud: Amberley Publishing. ISBN 978-1-445-67053-9.
- Ramsland, Katherine (2011). The Mind of a Murderer: Privileged Access to the Demons That Drive Extreme Violence. New York: ABC-CLIO. ISBN 978-0-313-38673-2.
- Skelton, Douglas (2009). Glasgow's Black Heart: A City's Life of Crime. Edinburgh: Mainstream Publishing Company Limited. ISBN 978-1-845-96980-6.
- Whittington-Egan, Richard; Whittington-Egan, Molly (1992). The Murder Almanac. Glasgow: Neil Wilson Publishing. pp. 118–120. ISBN 1-897784-04-X.
- Wier, Nigel (2011). British Serial Killers. Milton Keynes: AuthorHouse UK. ISBN 978-1-467-88140-1.
- Wilson, Colin; Pitman, Patricia (1984). Encyclopedia of Murder. London: Pan Books. ISBN 978-0-330-28300-7.
- Wynn, Douglas (1996). On Trial for Murder. London: Pan Books. ISBN 978-0-330-33947-6.
