= Francis Forsyth =

British executed criminal (1942–1960)

Francis Robert George Henry James Forsyth
- Born: 24 March 1942; Brentford, West London, England
- Died: 10 November 1960 (age 18); Wandsworth Prison, England
- Status: Executed by hanging
- Convictions: Capital murder Assault; Theft
- Penalty: Death

Details
- Victims: Allan Jee, 23
- Date: 25 June 1960

Francis Robert George Henry James 'Flossie' Forsyth (24 March 1942 – 10 November 1960) was a British murderer who became one of the youngest people to be executed in Britain in the 20th century. He was hanged on 10 November 1960 at Wandsworth Prison for the murder of Allan Edward John Jee.

== Murder ==
On the evening of 25 June 1960, Forsyth, a road worker, was with unemployed driver Norman James 'Flash' Harris aged 23, coalman Christopher Louis Darby aged 20, and unemployed labourer Terence Lutt aged 17. At about 11.17 p.m. that night, on a footpath at the bottom of James Street, Hounslow, Middlesex, they set upon engineer Allan Edward John Jee aged 23, who was walking home after an evening with his fiancée, Jacqueline Herbert, to whom he had become engaged the previous day. Jee was about 20 yards (18 m) from his home when he was attacked. The gang kicked him unconscious and left him bleeding with a fractured skull. He died from a cerebral contusion two days later at the West Middlesex Hospital in Isleworth.

At the time, Forsyth, who had a lengthy criminal history starting from when he was 11, was on bail for assaulting two police officers at Heathrow Airport, and had been detained in an Approved School.

Anthony Cowell was standing at the other end of James Street and gave police a detailed description of the four. A friend of Forsyth, Kevin Cullinan, told police on 18 July that Forsyth had been boasting about the attack, and gave the names of the three others whom he had seen with Forsyth in a coffee bar on the night. The four were arrested two days later and traces of Jee's blood were found on Forsyth's winkle-picker shoes and trousers.

After his arrest, Forsyth claimed that he didn't intend to kill Jee:

"I only kicked him twice to keep him quiet. I didn't think I had hurt him that much. We did not want to roll anybody, but we had a few shants [drinks] and I always get a bit garrotty [violent] then."

== Trial ==
It was found during trial at the Old Bailey that Lutt had struck the first blow upon Jee but the kicking had been administered by Forsyth. Meanwhile, Harris had held Jee down. Only Darby claimed to have used no violence and the charge against him was reduced to non-capital murder. Pathologist Dr. Donald Teare testified that Jee had been kicked five times in the head.

Forsyth, Harris and Lutt were convicted of capital murder. Forsyth and Harris were sentenced to death by Mr Justice Winn on 26 September 1960 under the Homicide Act 1957, which defined murder in the course of robbery as a capital crime (although nothing had actually been taken). As a minor, Lutt was sentenced to be detained at Her Majesty's pleasure, while Darby was convicted of non-capital murder and sentenced to life imprisonment. Lutt and Darby were both released from prison in 1970. Lutt died from leukemia in 1975, at the age of 31.

== Execution ==
Forsyth's and Harris's appeals were dismissed on 24 October 1960. A petition for clemency signed by 3,000 people including The Earl of Harewood, Donald Soper, Gilbert Harding, Kingsley Amis and J. B. Priestley was turned down on 8 November 1960. The executions took place two days later at 9 a.m. Forsyth was hanged by Harry Allen (assisted by Royston Rickard) and given a drop of seven feet and two inches. Harris was hanged at Pentonville Prison by Robert Leslie Stewart (assisted by H. F. Robinson). On the morning of his execution, Forsyth was heard weeping, "I don't want to die."

The day before his execution, Forsyth was granted a meeting with his pregnant girlfriend Margaret Catlin, whom he claimed was expecting his child in January 1961 (she gave birth to a girl four months later):

"Francis kept laughing and joking. He didn’t talk about [his execution] once. He asked me about the baby, whether I was going to keep it or not. I told him I would, and he said: 'Good'. I will not be afraid to bring up my child and tell it about its father, even though he was hanged as a murderer."

Forsyth sent a telegram to Catlin shortly before he was hanged. She received it three hours after the execution.

"Always remember my star will watch over you both and give you the love and strength you so richly deserve my angel yours till eternity."

Forsyth was the last 18-year-old to be hanged in Britain. 19-year-old Anthony Miller became the last teenager to be executed in Britain when he was hanged in Glasgow just over a month later, on 22 December 1960. That said, 20-year-old Oswald Grey was hanged for a murder he committed when he was 19 in 1962. Three other eighteen-year-olds were executed in Britain in the 20th century, Henry Julius Jacoby in 1922, Arthur Bishop in 1925, and German POW Armin Kuhne in 1945. The Children and Young Persons Act 1933 fixed the minimum age for a prisoner to be hanged at 18 years.

=== Victor Terry ===
On the morning of 10 November, 20-year-old Victor Terry, a friend of Forsyth, heard about the executions on his car radio. One hour later, he shot dead a security guard at a bank in Worthing, West Sussex during a robbery. Terry claimed to have been possessed by the spirit of American gangster Jack "Legs" Diamond. He was convicted of capital murder and hanged on the same gallows as Forsyth, on 25 May 1961.

== Bibliography ==
- John J. Eddleston, The Encyclopedia of Executions, p. 895, John Blake ISBN 1-84454-058-8
