= Steve Wade =

Steve, Steven or Stephen Wade may refer to:

- Stephen Wade (executioner) (1887–1956), British executioner
- Steve Wade (singer), Australian singer-songwriter and former member of Little River Band
- Stephen Wade (politician) (born 1960), Australian politician
- Stephen Wade (musician) (born 1953), American folk musician
