= Harry Allen (executioner) =

English executioner (1911–1992)

- Born: Harold Bernard Allen; 5 November 1911; Denaby Main, West Riding of Yorkshire, England
- Died: 14 August 1992 (aged 80); Fleetwood, Lancashire, England
- Occupations: Executioner; Bus driver; Publican
- Employer: HM Prison Service
- Spouses: Marjorie Clayton (m. 1933; div. 1958) Doris Dyke (m. 1963)
- Children: 2
- Relatives: Fiona Allen (granddaughter)

Harold Bernard Allen (5 November 1911 – 14 August 1992) was one of Britain's last official executioners, officiating between 1941 and 1964. He was chief executioner at 41 executions and acted as assistant executioner at 53 others, at various prisons in England, Scotland, Northern Ireland, the Channel Islands and Cyprus. He acted as assistant executioner for 14 years, mostly to Albert Pierrepoint from 1941 to 1955.

In October 1955 Allen was appointed as Chief Executioner alongside Pierrepoint, although he did not execute anyone in this role until 10 May 1956, when he hanged two EOKA members in Cyprus. Pierrepoint was no longer available because he had resigned in February 1956. Allen's most controversial hanging came in April 1962, when James Hanratty was hanged for murder, despite efforts to clear his name. Hanratty was proven guilty in 2002 by DNA. Allen also assisted in the 1953 execution of Derek Bentley, who was posthumously pardoned. He performed one of the last two executions in Britain, in August 1964.

== Early life ==
Born in Denaby Main, near Conisbrough in the West Riding of Yorkshire to James Allen and Emma Burns on 5 November 1911, Allen was brought up in Ashton-under-Lyne, Lancashire, and was educated at St Anne's Roman Catholic School in Burlington Street, Ashton. His first job was in the Transport Department at Park Bridge Iron Works, before he became a bus driver with Ashton Corporation, a job he continued to hold after he became an assistant hangman in 1941.

== Career as an executioner ==
Allen applied for a job in the Prison Service in the 1930s but was turned down. He successfully applied to be put on the Home Office list of executioners and was often employed as an assistant executioner to Tom Pierrepoint, the uncle of Albert Pierrepoint. As a preliminary step, he witnessed his first execution at the age of 29 – that of William Cooper – on 26 November 1940 at Bedford Prison, describing it as a "very good, clean job, not as gruesome as I expected".

Allen became a publican in Farnworth, Lancashire in the 1940s, combining his role as executioner with running the pub, which he ran until the early 1950s when he took over another pub, the Junction Inn, on Higher Lane in Whitefield.

In 1945, five German prisoners of war were hanged for murdering a fellow German soldier, Sergeant-Major Wolfgang Rosterg, whom they suspected of having betrayed their escape plan. It seems to have been this crime and ultimate execution that made the deepest impression on Allen. He wrote, "It was a foul murder. They staged a mock trial, kicking the victim to death and dragging him by the neck to the toilet where they hung his lifeless body on a waste pipe. These five prisoners are the most callous men I have ever met so far but I blame the Nazi doctrine for that. It must be a terrible creed." A 21-year-old, Erich Palme-König, was the first of the soldiers to be hanged at Pentonville Prison, swearing allegiance to the last to Nazi Germany.

On 28 January 1953, Allen assisted at the controversial execution of Derek Bentley, who was hanged for a murder committed by a friend and accomplice during an attempted robbery, and for which Bentley received a posthumous pardon 45 years later. Contrary to some accounts, Allen was not present at the execution of Ruth Ellis, the last woman to be hanged in the UK, in 1955: the assistant to Albert Pierrepoint on that occasion was Royston Rickard.

Following the resignation of Albert Pierrepoint and the death of Stephen Wade in 1956, Allen and Robert Leslie Stewart jointly became Chief Executioners. However, the Homicide Act 1957 reduced the number of condemned criminals by 75%, from an average of 15 a year in the early 1950s to about four a year in the late 1950s. As Chief Executioner, on 11 July 1958 Allen hanged American-born Scottish serial killer Peter Manuel at Barlinnie prison, Glasgow. He also hanged Guenther Podola on 5 November 1959, a German-born petty thief, and the last man to be hanged in the UK for killing a police officer.

His most controversial case was that of James Hanratty, hanged on 4 April 1962 at Bedford Prison for the "A6 murder" case. Efforts to clear Hanratty's name continued until 2001, when DNA testing matched Hanratty to the crime scene.

Allen performed the last execution in Northern Ireland in December 1961, when he hanged Robert McGladdery at Crumlin Road Gaol in Belfast. He also performed the last hanging in Scotland, when Henry Burnett was hanged at Craiginches Prison in Aberdeen on 15 August 1963 for the murder of Thomas Guyan. He hanged Russell Pascoe, one of the third-last prisoners to be hanged in a British prison, at Bristol's Horfield Prison on 17 December in the same year. He also performed one of the two final executions in the UK, when at 8.00 am on 13 August 1964 Gwynne Owen Evans was hanged at Strangeways Prison in Manchester for the murder of John Alan West. This occurred simultaneously with the execution of Evans's accomplice Peter Anthony Allen, who was hanged at Walton Gaol in Liverpool by Robert Leslie Stewart.

Allen always wore a bow tie during executions as a sign of respect. Of his job, Allen said, "I never felt a moment's remorse and always slept peacefully on the nights before and after a hanging."

A second man also answering to the name "Harry Allen", Herbert Allen, an ice cream salesman from the West Midlands, was also on the official list of executioners for a period in the early 1950s, having graduated from the same training group as Syd Dernley. The two Harry Allens are known to have worked together as assistants on at least two double hangings.

== Executions performed by Allen as head executioner ==
- 23 July 1957 – John Wilson Vickers (HMP Durham)
- 4 December 1957 – Dennis Howard (HMP Winson Green, Birmingham)
- 11 July 1958 – Peter Thomas Manuel (HMP Barlinnie, Glasgow)
- 12 August 1958 – Matthew Kavanagh (Winson Green, Birmingham)
- 3 September 1958 – Frank Stokes (Durham)
- 10 February 1959 – Ernest Raymond Jones (HMP Armley, Leeds)
- 28 April 1959 – Joseph Chrimes (HMP Pentonville, London)
- 8 May 1959 – Ronald Henry Marwood (Pentonville, London)
- 14 August 1959 – Bernard Hugh Walden (Armley, Leeds)
- 9 October 1959 – Francis Joseph Huchet (Newgate Street prison, Saint Helier, Channel Islands)
- 5 November 1959 – Guenther Fritz Erwin Podola (HMP Wandsworth, London)
- 1 September 1960 – John Louis Constantine (HMP Lincoln)
- 10 November 1960 – Francis George Forsyth (Wandsworth, London)
- 22 December 1960 – Anthony Joseph Miller (Barlinnie, Glasgow)
- 27 January 1961 – Wasyl Gnypiuk (Lincoln)
- 9 February 1961 – George Riley (HMP Shrewsbury)
- 29 March 1961 – John Day (HMP Bedford)
- 25 May 1961 – Victor John Terry (Wandsworth, London)
- 29 June 1961 – Zsiga Pankotia (Armley, Leeds)
- 6 July 1961 – Edwin Albert Bush (Pentonville, London)
- 25 July 1961 – Samuel McLaughlin (HMP Crumlin Road, Belfast, Northern Ireland)
- 8 September 1961 – Henryck Niemascz (Wandsworth, London)
- 20 December 1961 – Robert Andrew McGladdery (Crumlin Road, Belfast, Northern Ireland)
- 4 April 1962 – James Hanratty (HMP Bedford)
- 20 November 1962 – Oswald Augustine Grey (Winson Green, Birmingham)
- 28 November 1962 – James Smith (HMP Strangeways, Manchester)
- 15 August 1963 – Henry John Burnett (HMP Craiginches, Aberdeen)
- 17 December 1963 – Russell Pascoe (HMP Horfield, Bristol)
- 13 August 1964 – Gwynne Owen Evans (HMP Strangeways, Manchester)

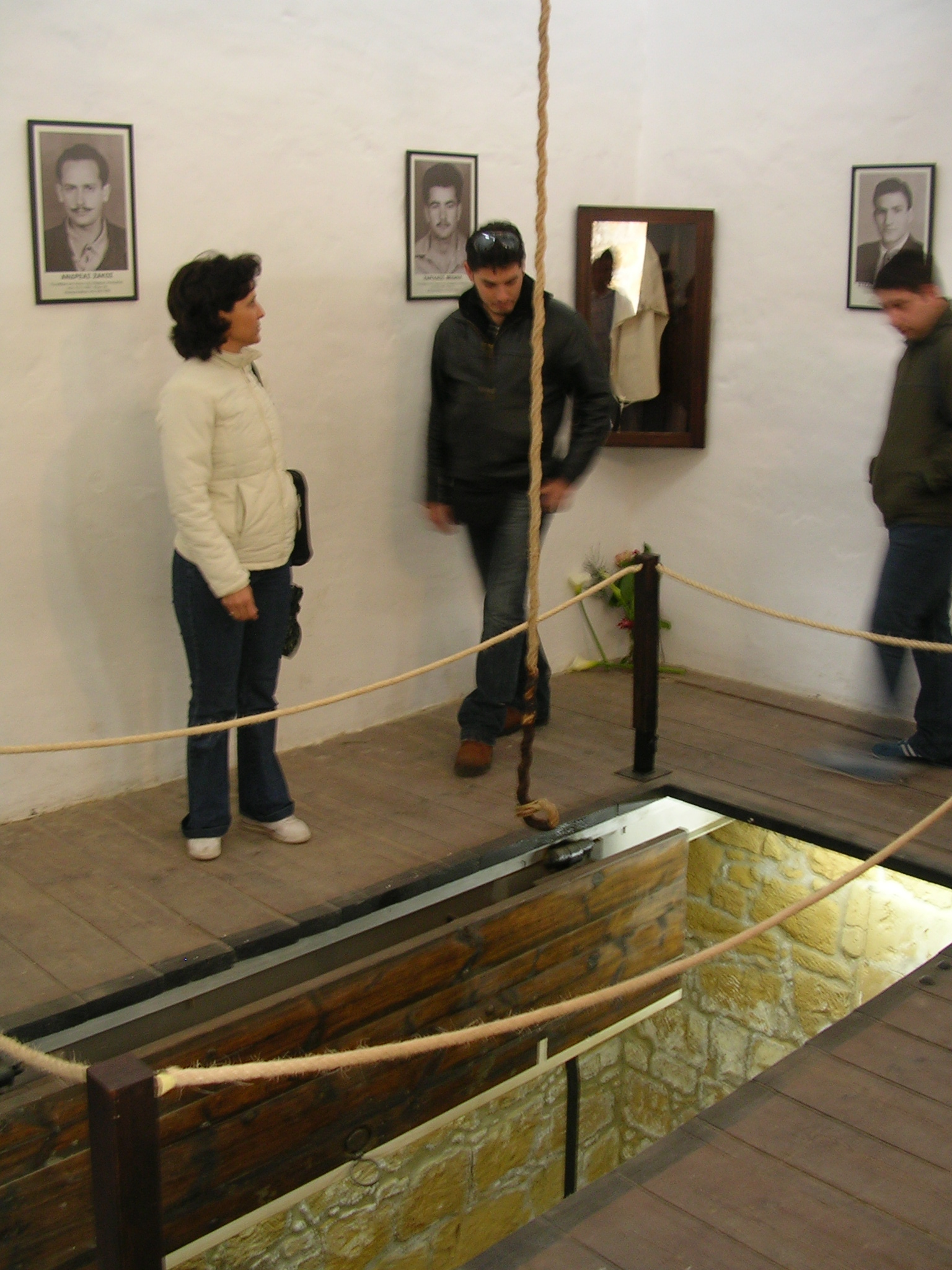
The gallows at the Central Jail of Nicosia, which is now a museum.

In addition to these, Allen also performed the 9 executions of EOKA members which took place at the Central Jail of Nicosia, Cyprus in 1956 and 1957. The remains of the hanged men are buried within the walls of the prison, in the "Imprisoned Graves" section. Their names are:

- Michalis Karaolis – executed 10 May 1956
- Andreas Dimitriou – executed 10 May 1956
- Iakovos Patatsos – executed 9 August 1956
- Andreas Zakos – executed 9 August 1956
- Harilaos Michael – executed 9 August 1956
- Michael Koutsoftas – executed 21 September 1956
- Stelios Mavrommatis – executed 21 September 1956
- Andreas Panagidis – executed 21 September 1956
- Evagoras Pallikaridis – executed 14 March 1957

Following the Independence of Cyprus in 1960, Allen performed the final three executions at the Central Jail of Nicosia for the new Cypriot government, assisted by John Underhill. All 3 executions took place on 13 June 1962:

- Hambis Zacharia – killed a man in a Limassol vineyard in 1958
- Michael Hiletikos – shot a man dead outside a Limassol nightclub in 1961. Fled to UK and was extradited to Cyprus to stand trial
- Lazaris Demetriou – shot a man dead outside a Limassol nightclub in 1961. The accomplice of Michael Hiletikos

== Personal life and diaries ==
Allen's first wife was Marjorie Clayton whom he married in 1933. She left him on the day that he was hanging Peter Manuel. Allen's second wife was Doris Dyke, whom he married in 1963.

In October 2008 it was revealed that Allen had kept a diary which included a precise log of the prisoners and how they died. He recorded each prisoner's age, weight, height and calculations for the length of rope needed to hang them. The diary and other belongings were sold at auction in Knutsford, Cheshire on behalf of his widow in November 2008 for £17,200.

Allen always publicly maintained that hanging was a "swift and humane business". In his diaries he revealed that the execution of one prisoner, Peter Griffiths, who was convicted at Lancaster assizes of murdering a three-year-old child, June Anne Devaney, in the grounds of Queens Park Hospital in Blackburn on 15 May 1948, took 30 seconds, which would have been the time from Allen's entering the condemned cell to the moment of the drop. Many other executions were faster than this, but death itself was always practically instantaneous. Griffiths was 22 years old, 5' 10" tall, weighed 10st 8lbs, and was given a drop of 7 feet 6 inches on 15 November 1948 at Walton Gaol. Of another hanging he noted, "Very good job, but should have had another two or three inches – very strong."

His granddaughter Fiona Allen is a comedian and actress, who rose to fame on the comedy sketch show Smack the Pony. She said of him, "It's as if I had two grandfathers. One was the sweet, lovely man who took me for walks on the beach, bought me sweets and toys and always had me laughing and giggling. The other one was the man employed to take lives for the Government. When I was a kid, everyone in the area knew what he did. I remember going round to my first boyfriend's house for the first time and I tried to impress his dad by telling him I wanted to go on the stage. He looked up from his paper and said, 'Going on the stage are you, lass? Well keep away from the trapdoor!'".

== Later life ==
Under the Murder (Abolition of Death Penalty) Act 1965, capital punishment in Great Britain for murder was suspended, before finally being abolished in 1969 (it was abolished in 1973 in Northern Ireland). Although the death penalty remained for other crimes such as treason and piracy with violence, no further executions took place in the UK, although a working gallows was kept in service and regularly tested at Wandsworth Prison until 1998. It was dismantled when the death penalty for treason and piracy was abolished by the Crime and Disorder Act 1998.

After abolition, Harry Allen worked for a few years in security at an engineering firm in Blackburn.

Allen moved to Fleetwood with his wife Doris in 1977, to escape the continued publicity, and worked there as a cashier at Fleetwood Pier. He died on 14 August 1992, just a month after Albert Pierrepoint, who had died on 10 July in Southport.
