= Graham Swanwick =

British barrister and High Court judge

Sir Graham Swanwick MBE

Justice of the High Court
- In office 1966–1980

Personal details
- Born: August 24, 1906
- Died: June 23, 2003 (aged 96)
- Education: Winchester College; University College, Oxford
- Known for: Leading the prosecution against James Hanratty, the 'A6 murderer'
- Awards: Member of the Order of the British Empire (MBE) (1944)

Sir Graham Russell Swanwick, MBE (24 August 1906 – 23 June 2003) was a British barrister and High Court judge. He is best remembered for leading the prosecution against James Hanratty, the 'A6 murderer', one of the last men to be hanged in England.

== Biography ==
=== Early life and legal career ===
Swanwick was the son of Eric Drayton Swanwick, a solicitor, and Margery Eleanor (née Norton), of Whittington House, Chesterfield. Educated at Winchester College and University College, Oxford, he was called to the Bar by the Inner Temple in 1930 and joined the old Midland Circuit. During the Second World War, Swanwick served in the Royal Air Force Volunteer Reserve from 1940 to 1945, serving first at RAF Uxbridge with the 2nd Tactical Air Force, then in Brussels and in Germany. Rising to the rank of Wing Commander, he was mentioned in despatches and appointed a MBE (Military Division) in 1944.

Returning to the Bar after the war, Swanwick moved from common law to criminal and civil work. He practised from 1 King's Bench Walk (later 36 Bedford Row), of which he became the head. Swanwick was appointed a Queen's Counsel in 1956, and elected a Bencher of the Inner Temple in 1962. He was also elected Leader of the Midland Circuit in 1961, serving until 1965. He was Recorder of Lincoln from 1957 to 1959 and of Leicester from 1959 until 1966, when he was appointed to the High Court. He was also a Judge of Appeal of the Channel Islands from 1964 to 1966, Chairman of the Derbyshire Quarter Sessions from 1963 to 1966, and Deputy Chairman from 1966 until their abolition 1971.

In 1962, he led the prosecution against James Hanratty, nicknamed the 'A6 murderer'. The trial ran for 21 days, the longest criminal trial in English legal history up to that time. Hanratty was convicted of murder and hanged. Swanwick remained convinced of Hanratty's guilt when doubt arose as to whether he was guilty. In 2002, the Court of Appeal ruled that his guilt was beyond doubt due to DNA evidence.

Among his other notable cases, in 1964 Swanwick defended John Denby Wheater, a solicitor involved in the Great Train Robbery. In 1965, he appeared for barrister Michael Worsley against his former client, the wrestler Norbert Rondel: the case reaffirmed the principle that barristers were immune from an action for negligence from a client.

=== Judicial career ===
Swanwick was appointed to the High Court of Justice in 1966, and received the customary knighthood. He was assigned to the Queen's Bench Division; from 1975 to 1978, he was Presiding Judge of the Midland and Oxford Circuit. He retired in 1980.

In 1976, he tried 14 prison officers charged with assaulting the Birmingham Six in prison; they were acquitted by the jury. In 1977, he tried the so-called "Epping Torso murder case", in which London criminals Reginald Dudley and Robert Maynard were convicted of the murders of Billy Moseley and Micky Cornwall. Dudley and Maynard's convictions were quashed in 2002.

== Family ==
Swanwick married Helen Barbara Reid in 1933; they had two sons before divorcing in 1945. In 1952, he married Mrs Audrey Celia Parkinson, daughter of H. C. Hextall, of Ford, Ashurst, Steyning, Sussex; she died in 1987.
