= Robert Leslie Stewart =

Scottish executioner

Robert Leslie Stewart (April 1918 – 30 April 1988), from Edinburgh, Scotland, was one of the last executioners in the United Kingdom, officiating between 1950 and 1964.

Brought up in Dundee Street in Edinburgh, 3 miles from Saughton Prison, Stewart completed the Prison Commissioners' Assistant Executioner training course in September 1950 at Pentonville Prison in London. His name first appeared on the Home Office list in 1950, with his first engagement occurring at Norwich on 19 July 1951, assisting Stephen Wade at the execution of Alfred Reynolds.

Stewart was active on the Home Office list between 1950 and the suspension of capital punishment for murder in 1965, carrying out 21 executions as assistant. On the 1957 printing of the list, Stewart and Harry Allen were both promoted to the role of executioner in the wake of the resignation of Albert Pierrepoint and the death of Wade, both in 1956. In this capacity, Stewart carried out six executions. He also assisted Harry Allen at the execution of Anthony Miller, the last teenager to be executed in the United Kingdom.

Stewart performed one of the last executions in the United Kingdom at 8 am on 13 August 1964, when he hanged Peter Anthony Allen at Walton Prison. Allen had been convicted of the murder of John Alan West; Allen's accomplice, Gwynne Owen Evans, was hanged at Strangeways Prison in Manchester, at the same time by Harry Allen. Stewart also carried out the last execution in Wales, that of Vivian Teed at Swansea Prison in May 1958, for the murder of a postmaster during a robbery in Swansea.

Stewart died in South Africa in 1988 at the age of 70. He had emigrated there after the abolition of capital punishment to work as an airline engineer.

== Executions performed by Stewart as chief executioner ==
- 6 May 1958 – Vivian Teed (HMP Swansea)
- 17 December 1958 – Brian Chandler (HMP Durham)
- 14 May 1959 – Michael George Tatum (HMP Winchester)
- 10 November 1960 – Norman Harris (HMP Pentonville, London)
- 17 December 1963 - Dennis Whitty (HMP Winchester)
- 13 August 1964 – Peter Anthony Allen (HMP Liverpool)
