= James Hanratty =

British murderer (1936–1962)

- Born: 4 October 1936; Farnborough, Kent, England
- Died: 4 April 1962 (aged 25); Bedford Prison, Bedfordshire, England
- Known for: A6 murder
- Status: Executed by hanging
- Convictions: Capital murder Burglary; Larceny
- Penalty: Death

James Hanratty (4 October 1936 – 4 April 1962), also known as the A6 Murderer, was a British murderer and rapist who was one of the final eight people in the United Kingdom to be executed before capital punishment was abolished. He was hanged at Bedford Jail on 4 April 1962, after being convicted of the murder of scientist Michael Gregsten, aged 36, who was shot dead in a car on the A6 at Deadman's Hill, near Clophill, Bedfordshire, in August 1961. Gregsten's girlfriend, Valerie Storie, was raped, shot five times, and left paralysed.

According to Storie, the couple were abducted at gunpoint in their car at Dorney Reach, Buckinghamshire, by a man with a Cockney accent and mannerisms matching Hanratty's. The gunman ordered Gregsten to drive in several directions, before stopping beside the A6 at Deadman's Hill, where the offences took place. The initial prime suspects were Hanratty, a petty criminal, and Peter Louis Alphon, an eccentric drifter. In police line-ups, Storie did not recognise Alphon, but eventually identified Hanratty.

Storie's testimony was critical in securing a guilty verdict, but this was questioned by many who felt the supporting evidence too weak to justify conviction. Hanratty's brother fought for decades afterward to have the verdict overturned.

In 1997, a police inquiry cast major doubt on Hanratty's guilt. It concluded that he was wrongfully convicted, and the case was sent to the court of appeal. However, in 2002, the court ruled that subsequent DNA testing of surviving crime scene evidence conclusively proved Hanratty's guilt beyond any doubt.

== Early life ==
James Hanratty was born on 4 October 1936 in Farnborough, Kent, the eldest of four sons of James Francis Hanratty and his wife Mary Ann Hanratty nee Wilson. By 1937, the family had moved to Wembley in Middlesex, Tewkesbury Gardens, Kingsbury.

Hanratty's early years were troubled; he was described as a person with intellectual disabilities, a psychopath, and a pathological liar. By the age of 11, he had been declared ineducable at St James Catholic High School, Burnt Oak, Barnet, although his parents refused to accept he was mentally deficient and successfully resisted attempts to have him placed in a special school. After leaving the school in 1951 at the age of 15, Hanratty, still illiterate, joined the Public Cleansing Department of Wembley Borough Council as a refuse sorter. In July of the following year, he fell from his bicycle, injuring his head and remaining unconscious for 10 hours; he was admitted to Wembley Hospital, where he remained for nine days.

Shortly after his discharge, Hanratty left home for Brighton, where he obtained casual work with a road haulier. Eight weeks later, he was found semi-conscious in the street, having apparently collapsed from either hunger or exposure. Initially admitted to the Royal Sussex Hospital, Brighton, he was transferred to St Francis Hospital, Haywards Heath, where he underwent a craniotomy following the erroneous diagnosis of a brain haemorrhage. The report made there acknowledged his unhappy home background (he claimed he was frightened of his mother and had no filial feelings towards his father) and his mental handicaps. No precise diagnoses were offered, and it has since been suggested that he suffered from either epilepsy or post-concussional syndrome, which would have had a marked effect on his personality.

Hanratty was sent to recuperate at an aunt's home in Bedford, a place he and his brother Michael had visited as children on holiday. Hanratty found a job there driving a mechanical shovel for the company of Green Brothers, which made breeze blocks, and remained with the firm for three years. It was about 1954 that Hanratty became attracted to Soho, where he frequented various clubs and other haunts of the criminal underworld.

== Criminal record ==
By the time of his arrest for the murder of Michael Gregsten, Hanratty already had four convictions for motoring offences and housebreaking.

On 7 September 1954, aged 17, Hanratty appeared before Harrow Magistrates' where he was placed on probation for taking a motor vehicle without consent, and for driving without a licence or insurance. Shortly afterwards, he began psychiatric treatment as an outpatient at the Portman Clinic.

In October 1955, aged 18, Hanratty appeared at the County of Middlesex Sessions, where he was sentenced to two terms of two years' imprisonment, to run concurrently, for housebreaking and theft. Despatched to the youth wing of Wormwood Scrubs, he slashed his wrists; placed in the prison hospital, he was declared a 'potential psychopath'. After his release, his father resigned his job as dustman with Wembley council to start a window cleaning business with his son in an attempt to keep him away from crime.

On 3 July 1957, aged 20, five months after his release from Wormwood Scrubs, Hanratty was sentenced at Brighton Magistrates' Court to six months' imprisonment (he served four) for a variety of motoring offences, including theft of a motor vehicle and driving without a licence. He was sent to Walton Prison, Liverpool, where he was again diagnosed as a psychopath.

In March 1958, aged 21, at the County of London Sessions, Hanratty was again convicted of car theft, and of driving while disqualified, and sentenced to three years' corrective training at Wandsworth Prison, and then to Maidstone Prison. While at Maidstone, Hanratty came to the attention of a researcher who lived and worked alongside the inmates; he was later to remark upon Hanratty's "gross social and emotional immaturity". After a failed escape attempt, Hanratty was transferred to Camp Hill Prison, Isle of Wight. He attempted to escape that facility as well, and was sent to Strangeways Prison, Manchester. Transferred briefly to Durham Prison, he was returned to Strangeways where, having served his full term, he was released in March 1961, aged 24.

== Murder ==
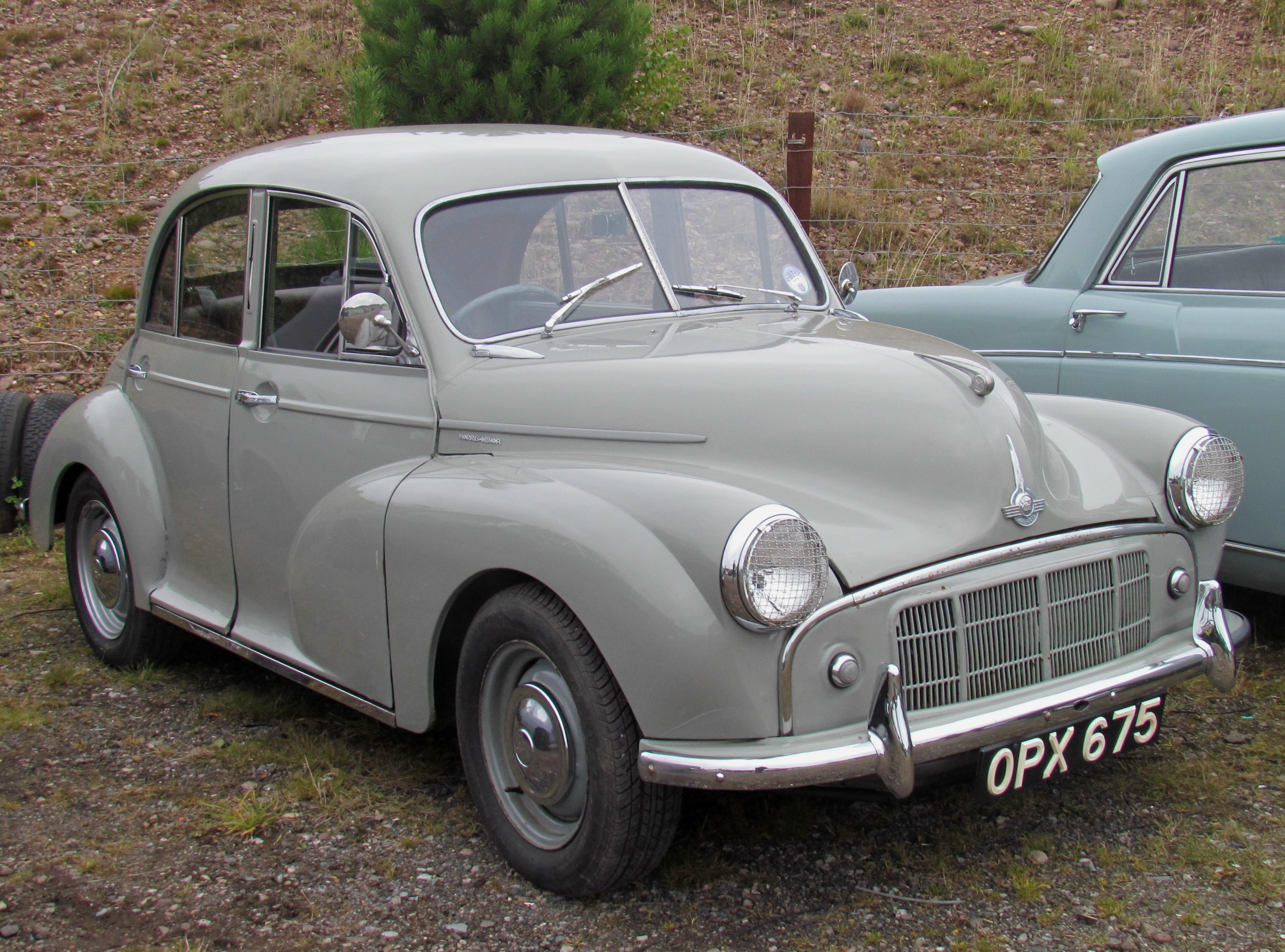
Grey Morris Minor Series II 1956 four-door saloon similar to the one Gregsten was driving

=== Facts as ascertained by the police ===
At about 6:45 am on 23 August 1961, the body of Michael John Gregsten was discovered in a lay-by on the A6 road at Deadman's Hill, near the Bedfordshire village of Clophill, by John Kerr, an Oxford undergraduate conducting a traffic census. Lying next to Gregsten, semi-conscious, was Gregsten's girlfriend, Valerie Jean Storie. Gregsten had been shot twice in the head with a .38 revolver at point blank range; Storie had been raped, and then shot with the same weapon, four times in the left shoulder and once in the neck, leaving her paralysed below the shoulders. Kerr alerted Sydney Burton, a farm labourer, who flagged down two cars and asked the drivers to call an ambulance.

The car Gregsten and Storie had been using at the time of the attack, a grey four-door 1956 Morris Minor registration 847 BHN, was found abandoned behind Redbridge tube station in Essex later that evening. The car had been jointly owned by Gregsten's mother and aunt, and lent to the couple who, according to Storie, were planning to attend a car rally.

Gregsten was a scientist at the Road Research Laboratory in Slough. Storie was an assistant at the same laboratory and had been having an affair with Gregsten, although this did not become public knowledge until Storie wrote a series of articles for the popular Today magazine in June 1962, five months after the trial. Gregsten had separated from his wife Janet (d. 1995) who lived with their two children at Abbots Langley. Storie, an only child, lived with her parents in Cippenham, a suburb of Slough.

=== Testimony of Valerie Storie ===
Late in the evening of Tuesday, 22 August 1961, Valerie Storie was sitting alongside Gregsten in his car in a cornfield at Dorney Reach, Buckinghamshire. A man tapped on the driver's door window; when Gregsten wound it down, a large black revolver was thrust into his face, and a cockney voice said, "This is a hold-up, I am a desperate man, I have been on the run for four months. If you do as I tell you, you will be all right." The man got into the back of the car and told Gregsten to drive further into the field, then stop. The man then kept them there for two hours, chattering to them incessantly. Storie recalled that he pronounced "things" as "fings" and "think" as "fink".

At 11.30pm, the man said he wanted food, and told Gregsten to start driving. The gunman knew the Bear Hotel, Maidenhead. Gregsten was ordered to stop at a milk vending machine and sent into a shop to buy cigarettes, and then to stop at a petrol station for more fuel. Although Gregsten and Storie offered to give him all their money and the car, the man appeared to have no plan and seemed to want them to stay with him. They drove around the suburbs of north London, apparently aimlessly. The journey continued along the A5 through St Albans, which the gunman mistakenly insisted was Watford, before joining the A6.

At about 1.30am on Wednesday 23 August, the car was on the A6, travelling south, when the man said he wanted a 'kip' (sleep). Twice he told Gregsten to turn off the road and then changed his mind, and the car returned to the A6. At Deadman's Hill, the man ordered Gregsten to pull into a lay-by. Gregsten at first refused, but the man became aggressive and threatened them with the gun. The man then said he wanted to sleep, and that he would have to tie them up. Storie and Gregsten pleaded with him not to shoot them. The man tied Storie's hands behind her back with Gregsten's tie and then saw a duffle bag containing some clean clothing. He told Gregsten to pass the bag but, as Gregsten moved, there were two shots. Gregsten had been hit twice in the head and died instantly. Storie screamed, "You bastard! You shot him. Why did you shoot him?" The gunman replied that Gregsten had frightened him by turning too quickly. After ignoring her pleas to shoot her as well, or let her get help for Gregsten, the gunman told her to kiss him. She refused and, having managed to free her hands, tried to disarm him but was overpowered; after he threatened to shoot her, she relented.

He then retrieved a cloth from the duffle bag, covered Gregsten's bloodied head with it, and ordered Storie to clamber into the back of the car, over Gregsten's body. When she refused, the man got out and forced her out of the car at gunpoint, pushing her on to the back seat, where he ordered her to undo her brassiere and remove her underwear before raping her. He then ordered Storie to drag Gregsten's body out of the car to the edge of the lay-by 2 or 3 metres (yards) away, before ordering her back into the car to start it for him and demonstrate the operation of the gears and switches. It was clear he either had not driven before, or was unfamiliar with a Morris Minor. Storie then left the car and returned to sit beside Gregsten's body.

The gunman got out of the car and approached her; pleading for her life, she took a pound note from her pocket, screaming, "Here, take this, take the car and go." He took several steps back to the car before turning and firing four bullets at her, then reloaded and fired again. Of approximately seven bullets fired, five hit Storie; she fell to the ground next to Gregsten and played dead. Satisfied he had killed her, the gunman drove off southward with much crashing of gears, in the direction of Luton.

It was now approximately 3am, six hours after the ordeal had started at Dorney Reach. After vainly screaming and waving her petticoat to attract the attention of passing motorists, Storie lost consciousness.

== Investigation ==
The first policeman on the scene was handed a census form on which Kerr had written down Storie's account of what she recalled at that moment; the document was never seen again. Storie gave another statement to the police later that morning, just before she underwent surgery in Bedford Hospital. Storie recalled what the man had said about being on the run for four months, yet he was immaculately dressed in a dark three-piece suit and with well-shined shoes.

In the evening of Thursday 24 August, the murder weapon, a .38 revolver, was discovered under the back seat of a 36A London bus, fully loaded and wiped clean of fingerprints. With the gun was a handkerchief which provided DNA evidence many years later. The police issued an appeal to boarding-house keepers to report any unusual or suspicious guests. The manager of the Alexandra Court Hotel reported a man who had locked himself in his room for five days after the murder, and the police picked him up. The suspect falsely identified himself as 'Frederick Durrant'; he was actually Peter Louis Alphon, a drifter surviving on an inheritance and the proceeds of gambling. Alphon was the son of a senior figure at Scotland Yard. Alphon claimed he had spent the evening of 22 August with his mother, and the following night at the Vienna Hotel, Maida Vale; the police quickly confirmed this and Alphon was released.

On 29 August, Valerie Storie and another witness, Edward Blackhall, who had seen the driver of the Morris Minor, compiled an Identikit picture which was then released. However, only two days later, Storie gave a different description of her assailant to the police.

On 7 September, Meike Dalal was attacked in her home in Richmond, Surrey, by a man claiming to be the A6 murderer, whom she later identified as Alphon in an identity parade on 23 September.

On 11 September, two cartridge cases were found in the guest basement bedroom of the Vienna Hotel, which were matched with the bullets that killed Gregsten and to the ones in the gun found on the bus. The hotel manager, William Nudds, made a statement to police naming the last occupant of the room as 'James Ryan'. At the trial Nudds also stated that the man, upon leaving, had asked the way to a bus stop for a 36A bus, though his statement to police had merely mentioned the 36 bus. Nudds' statement also said that Alphon had stayed in the hotel as he claimed, and had remained in his room, Room 6, all night. The police raided the hotel, and questioned Nudds again, who then changed his story, claiming that Alphon had in fact been in the basement and 'Ryan' in Room 6 but, for reasons unknown, had swapped rooms during the night. Nudds also now added that Alphon had left the hotel 'calm and composed'.

The police then took the unusual step of publicly naming Alphon as the murder suspect. Alphon subsequently surrendered himself, and was subjected to an intense interrogation. Valerie Storie did not recognise Alphon in an identity parade, and he was released four days later after being detained on a charge of assaulting Meike Dalal. Alphon was recorded by PC Ian Thomson as saying "there can't have been any fingerprints in the car otherwise mine would have given me away". Police went back to Nudds, the hotel manager (who himself had a lengthy criminal record for fraud and other offences), who now said that his second statement was a lie, and his first statement, implicating 'Ryan', was in fact true. His reason for lying was that he had seen that Alphon was the police's prime suspect, and had wanted to assist their case.

After some investigation, 'Ryan' turned out to be James Hanratty, a 25-year-old petty criminal with four convictions for car theft, theft and burglary. Hanratty telephoned Scotland Yard several times, saying he had fled because he had no credible alibi for the date in question, but repeated each time that he had nothing to do with the A6 murder. During one of the phone calls, he pronounced "think" as "fink".

On 11 October, Hanratty was arrested by police in Blackpool, at the Stevonia cafe.

On 14 October, Valerie Storie identified Hanratty in an identity parade, after each of the men in the parade had repeated the phrase used by the murderer: "Be quiet, will you? I'm thinking." Hanratty was then charged with the capital murder of Michael Gregsten.

== Trial ==
Hanratty's capital murder trial started at Bedfordshire Assizes on 22 January 1962 before Mr Justice Gorman and a jury; it was originally to have been heard at the Old Bailey, as requested by Hanratty's defence counsel, Michael Sherrard QC, later CBE. It is not known why the trial was moved to Bedford, just nine miles from the murder scene, although this afforded easier access for the now-paraplegic Valerie Storie, who had received treatment at nearby Stoke Mandeville Hospital. The prosecution was led by Graham Swanwick QC, later a High Court judge. Among the prosecution team at the trial was Geoffrey Lane, who was subsequently appointed Lord Chief Justice. The trial lasted 21 days, the longest in English legal history up to that time.

Hanratty's initial defence was that he had been in Liverpool on the day of the murder, but then, halfway through the trial, he changed part of his story, claiming that he had in fact been in Rhyl, North Wales. At that time there was no conclusive forensic evidence to connect Hanratty with the car or the murder scene. Although Hanratty's blood group (O) was the same as the murderer's, it was a fairly common blood type shared by 36% of the British population, including Peter Alphon and, apart from Storie's identification, there was no other evidence that Hanratty had ever been in the Maidenhead area. While he was a professional thief, he had no convictions for violence, and apparently had never possessed a gun, although he later admitted to the police that he had attempted to obtain one after his last release from prison in March 1961. Moreover, the murderer drove badly, whereas Hanratty was an experienced car thief.

No defence on the basis of mental history was raised at Hanratty's trial.

=== First defence – The Liverpool alibi ===
Hanratty claimed that he was staying with friends in Liverpool at the time of the murder, where he had also gone to see one of his criminal friends and former cell mate Terry McNally from Dingle to sell some jewellery. Hanratty claimed that his suitcase had been handed in to Lime Street Station to a 'man with a withered or turned hand'. At the trial, the prosecution called Peter Stringer, who had an artificial arm, but who denied ever having seen the suitcase or Hanratty. However, there was another person called William Usher, who did have two fingers missing from one hand, which looked withered. Usher admitted remembering Hanratty and the suitcase, and partly remembered the name of the man as 'Ratty'; he was located by private detectives working for the defence, but was never called as a witness.

Hanratty said he had called into a sweetshop in Scotland Road and asked directions to 'Carleton' or 'Tarleton' Road. The Police tracked down a Mrs Dinwoodie, who served in a sweetshop in Scotland Road, and who recalled a man like Hanratty asking for directions. However, she was certain that this occurred on Monday 21 August. There was plenty of evidence that Hanratty had been in London all day on Monday 21 August: in the morning he had deposited a suit into a dry cleaners' in Swiss Cottage; he had been to his friend Charles France's house on the Monday afternoon, and visited the Vienna Hotel in the evening. Hanratty's defence claimed that Mrs Dinwoodie was mistaken about the date.

Just before the defence opened its case, Hanratty changed part of his alibi.

=== Second defence – The Rhyl alibi ===
Hanratty confessed to his defence barrister that he had invented part of the Liverpool story as he was unsure he could prove where he was. He then stated that he had in fact been in the Welsh coastal town of Rhyl. Within a few days, the defence had checked and assembled a new alibi for Hanratty. According to this, Hanratty had gone to Rhyl to sell a stolen watch to a 'fence', arriving there in the evening of Tuesday 22 August and staying in a boarding house near the railway line. Private detectives tracked down a Mrs Grace Jones, a landlady with a guest house which had a green bath in the attic as described by Hanratty. She remembered a man resembling Hanratty, and at first said he stayed there during the week of 19–26 August but later said she couldn’t really remember what week he did stay. Alexei Sayle's father Joe had stayed there between 21–24 August, but did not recall seeing Hanratty.

The prosecution produced witnesses attesting that all the rooms were already occupied at the time and accused Mrs Jones of being an unreliable witness.

=== End of the trial ===
The jury retired to consider the evidence and reach a verdict on Saturday 17 February. After six hours they returned to ask the judge for the definition of 'reasonable doubt'. After nine hours, they returned to the court and entered a unanimous verdict of guilty. Hanratty's appeal was dismissed on 13 March, and despite a petition signed by more than 90,000 people, Hanratty was hanged by executioner Harry Allen at Bedford on 4 April 1962, still protesting his innocence. Hanratty was initially buried in the grounds of Bedford Gaol, but, on 22 February 1966, his remains were exhumed and re-interred in a grave at Watford, later shared with his aunt.

On the night before his execution in 1962, Hanratty told his father that he was innocent and asked him to posthumously clear his name.

== Private investigations ==
=== 'A6 Defence Committee' ===
The 'A6 Defence Committee' was a self-appointed group of campaigners and activists, who included the journalist Paul Foot and the Labour politicians Fenner Brockway and Joan Lestor, the former and current MPs for the Eton & Slough constituency where Valerie Storie lived. The Committee attempted to assist Hanratty in his defence, and later tried to disprove his conviction.

The A6 Committee made a list of claims which, they contended, indicated that Alphon was the murderer:

- Alphon resembled the Identikit pictures more than Hanratty did;
- When stressed, Alphon lapsed into Cockney;
- Alphon never produced a convincing alibi;
- He provided a more credible motive than Hanratty could;
- He was a poor driver, as witnesses had seen the Morris Minor being driven erratically towards Redbridge Station;
- Paul Foot obtained a copy of his bank account, showing that Alphon received payments in cash totalling £7,569 between October 1961 and June 1962.

Paul Foot warned "against jumping to hasty conclusions, in particular about Peter Alphon... he really didn't know as much as he pretended. He certainly didn't know what he alleged – that Mrs Gregsten was the prime mover in commissioning the murder."

=== Ludovic Kennedy ===
The journalist and campaigner Ludovic Kennedy wrote many articles asserting Hanratty's innocence. However, in a new edition of his book, 36 Murders and Two Immoral Earnings, printed immediately after the publication of the Hanratty DNA evidence, he retracted his assertions of Hanratty's innocence.

=== Justice & Fox ===
During 1962, the case caught the interest of London businessman Jean Justice, the son of a Belgian diplomat and partner of barrister Jeremy Fox. Justice encouraged the initially reluctant Fox to help him expose what he believed to be the fabrication of the case against Hanratty. The pair tracked down Peter Alphon in February 1962, and began a long friendship with him for the purposes of establishing the truth. Justice attended the trial every day, being driven there by his chauffeur, and Alphon accompanied him from time to time. Justice took the precaution of making thorough notes, and recording all telephone conversations with Alphon. When Alphon found out, he flew into a rage. He started to bombard his own solicitor with threatening phone calls and letters.

==== Charles France ====
Charles France was also the recipient of highly unpleasant anonymous phone calls. France, who had suffered from bouts of severe depression for many years, committed suicide by gassing himself (his third attempt) about two weeks before the execution. He wrote a suicide letter to Hanratty; it was full of spite and venom, but at no point actually accused him of committing the murder. He also wrote a letter to the coroner, in which he referred to the great harm done to the family by Hanratty. France also left behind several letters for his family, the contents of which have never been made public.

At the time of France's second suicide attempt in January, one of the letters he left was addressed to the coroner, in which he wrote 'I am of sound mind and body. I do this act in the knowledge that it will clear my family's character of any act or wrong'. The circumstances of Hanratty's introduction to France's family, and the reasons for the crippling sense of guilt harboured by France for the harm he felt Hanratty had inflicted on them, so great that it could only be expiated by suicide, remain a mystery.

==== Alphon's account ====
According to Alphon, a man had paid him a sum of £5,000 to end the affair between Gregsten and Storie. Another man obtained a gun for Alphon, whereupon he set off and hijacked the pair. Alphon claimed he gave Gregsten two chances to get away but "each time the bloody man kept coming back". He also claimed the gun went off by accident.

A BBC Panorama episode in 1966 included extracts from the Jean Justice tapes. Alphon stuck to his confession and continued to repeat it until about 1971, when he withdrew his claims. However, Bob Woffinden wrote that there was only one occasion when Justice and Jeremy Fox supported Alphon financially, when Fox paid a hotel bill for him. Fox split from Jean Justice in the 1970s, but continued the fight to clear Hanratty until his death in 1999, three years before the Court of Appeal upheld the conviction on the basis of the DNA evidence retrieved from Hanratty's corpse.

Peter Alphon died in January 2009 after a fall at his home. The following month Richard Ingrams, a close friend and colleague of Paul Foot, wrote a brief article about Alphon's part in the case in The Independent. Ingrams said that Alphon, in conversations with Foot and others, had spoken "obsessively about the case, frequently incriminating himself". Ingrams said that Foot continued until his own death in 2004 to believe in Hanratty's alibi, despite the DNA tests of 2002.

== Official inquiries ==
The Hanratty family acting through their solicitor, Sir Geoffrey Bindman, repeatedly called for further inquiries into the case. Woffinden wrote that there is no evidence that the witnesses even saw the same Morris Minor.

The case for Hanratty's innocence was pursued by his family as well as by some of the opponents of capital punishment in the United Kingdom, who maintained that Hanratty was innocent and sought to draw attention to evidence that would cast doubt on the validity of his conviction.

Three Home Office inquiries were set up:

1. On 22 March 1967, Detective Superintendent Douglas Nimmo reported to Home Secretary Roy Jenkins
2. On 10 April 1975, Lewis Hawser QC reported to Home Secretary Roy Jenkins
3. On 29 May 1996, Detective Chief Superintendent Roger Matthews reported to Home Secretary Michael Howard

During the 1990s, increasingly advanced DNA analysis techniques became widely available.

== DNA evidence and appeal in 2002 ==
On 19 March 1997, the Home Office referred the case to the new Criminal Cases Review Commission (CCRC) where Baden Skitt chaired the investigation.

While some of the original items of physical evidence were destroyed, the sample from Storie's underwear had been discovered in 1991 and, in late 1997, the handkerchief was subsequently found in the possession of the Berkshire police. DNA was donated by Hanratty's mother and brother, which they expected to exonerate him when compared with DNA extracted from surviving evidence. Results from testing in June 1999 were said to be strong evidence of a familial match – the evidential DNA was "two and a half million times more likely" to belong to Hanratty than to anyone else. The Court of Appeal did not have the power to order an exhumation of Hanratty's body, but Lord Chief Justice Harry Woolf decided that this was desirable "in the interests of justice".

Hanratty's body was exhumed in 2001 to extract his DNA. His DNA was compared with other DNA extracted from, firstly, mucus preserved in the handkerchief within which the murder weapon had been found wrapped and, secondly, semen preserved in the underwear worn by Storie when she was raped. DNA samples from both sources exactly matched Hanratty's DNA. No DNA other than Hanratty's was found on the handkerchief in which the murder weapon had been found wrapped. The other piece of evidence tested, a sample from Storie's underwear, provided two different sets of male DNA – one that corresponded to Hanratty; and one which the Court of Appeal interpreted as coming from Gregsten.

The decision by the Court of Appeal included a discussion of the handling of the various items of evidence involved. The argument for contamination was dismissed as "fanciful" by the judges, who concluded that the "DNA evidence, standing alone, is certain proof of guilt". Modern testing of DNA from Hanratty's exhumed corpse and members of his family convinced Court of Appeal judges in 2002 that Hanratty's guilt was proved "beyond doubt". However, they further went on to note, in the summary of their judgement:

The DNA evidence does not "stand alone" and the Court refers to some of the more striking coincidences in the light of the DNA evidence if James Hanratty was not guilty. He would have been wrongly identified by three witnesses at identification parades; first as the person at the scene of the crime and secondly (by two witnesses) driving a vehicle close to where the vehicle in which the murder was committed was found. He had the same identifying manner of speech as the killer. He stayed in a room the night before the crime from which bullets that had been fired from the murder weapon were recovered. The murder weapon was recovered from a place on a bus which he regarded as a hiding place and the bus followed a route he could well have used. His DNA was found on a piece of material from Valerie Storie's knickers where it would be expected to be if he was guilty; it was also found on the handkerchief found with the gun. The Court concludes that this number of alleged coincidences mean that they are not coincidences but provide overwhelming proof of the safety of the conviction from an evidential perspective.

At the appeal hearing in 2002, Michael Mansfield QC, the barrister acting for the Hanratty family, said that a vial, among surviving evidential items, had been broken which could account for contamination. However, he acknowledged that, if contamination could be excluded, the DNA evidence demonstrated that Hanratty had committed the murder and rape. He argued that the evidence may have been contaminated because of lax handling procedures.

Paul Foot and some other campaigners argued elsewhere that the DNA evidence could have been contaminated, since the small DNA samples from items of clothing, kept in a police laboratory for over 40 years in conditions that, as they argue, "do not satisfy modern evidential standards", had to be subjected to amplification techniques to yield any genetic profile.

== Legacy ==
Hanratty's family and their supporters have continued to contest this conclusion and to press for a further review of his conviction.

Storie said "I identified the guilty man. I looked in his eyes and he looked in mine. I knew who he was and he knew that I recognised him. I had found the guilty person."

In 2014, Slough Community Transport named a new vehicle 'Valerie' in Storie's honour.

Storie died on 26 March 2016 aged 77 in the Cippenham house where she had been born.

== See also ==
- Major crimes in the United Kingdom

== Bibliography ==
- Eric Ambler. James Hanratty, an essay contained within The Ability To Kill (1963) London: The Bodley Head.
- Louis Blom-Cooper. The A6 Murder, Penguin Books (1963) OCLC 6124111.
- Jean Justice. Murder vs. murder – the British legal system and the A6 murder case (1964) OCLC 450377.
- Lord Russell of Liverpool. Deadman's Hill – was Hanratty guilty? (1965) OCLC 4707421.
- Jean Justice. Le Crime de la Route A6 (1968) Laffont ASIN B0000DQ7SP.
- Paul Foot. Who Killed Hanratty? (1973) ISBN 0-586-03813-2.
- C. Lewis Hawser QC. The case of James Hanratty (1975) Cmd 6021. ISBN 0-10-160210-3
- Bob Woffinden. Hanratty: The Final Verdict (1999) Pan Books ISBN 0-330-35301-2.
- Leonard Miller. Shadows of Deadman's Hill (2001) ISBN 1-902878-22-1.
- Norma Buddle. THE A6 MURDER: Was Hanratty Innocent? (2012).
- Rob Harriman. Hanratty – The DNA Travesty (2014) ASIN B00JI4FZUE.
- Alan Razen. Hanratty – The Inconvenient Truth (2014) CreateSpace Independent Publishing Platform ISBN 1500353256.
- Paul Stickler. The Long Silence: The True Story of James Hanratty and the A6 Murder by Valerie Storie, the Woman Who Lived to Tell the Tale (2021) ISBN 9780750996761.
- Leonard Miller. Hanratty’s Guilt: The A6 Murder and its Aftermath (2022) ISBN 9781838489854.
- Harriman, Robert (30 October 2023). Executed: But was James Hanratty Innocent?: A Damning Indictment of the DNA Evidence Used to Condemn Him. Pen and Sword True Crime. ISBN 978-1-3990-4497-4.
- Eddleston, John J (2013). The Story of James Hanratty.
- Taverne, Dick (20 March 2014). Dick Taverne: Against the Tide: Politics and Beyond: A Memoir. Biteback Publishing. ISBN 978-1-84954-727-7.
