= Anthony Miller (murderer) =

Scottish murderer hanged in 1960 (1941–1960)

Anthony Joseph Miller
- Born: 1941; Scotland
- Died: 22 December 1960 (age 19); HMP Barlinnie, Scotland
- Status: Executed by hanging
- Conviction: Capital murder
- Penalty: Death

Anthony Joseph Miller (1941 – 22 December 1960) became the second-last criminal to be executed in Scotland when he was hanged at Glasgow's Barlinnie Prison on 22 December 1960. Miller had been convicted of murdering John Cremin at Queen's Park Recreation Ground (near Hampden Park) in Glasgow on 6 April 1960. Miller, who was 19 when he was hanged, was the last teenager to be executed in the United Kingdom. That said, 20-year-old Oswald Grey was hanged for a murder he committed when he was 19 in 1962.

At the time of his arrest, he was an apprentice cabinet-maker who lived with his family in Dixon Road in Crosshill, in the South Side of Glasgow. Miller's accomplice James Denovan and his family lived in Calder Street in nearby Govanhill.

== Murder ==
The murder of John Cremin was a robbery that went wrong. Miller and Denovan were in the habit of working together as a team, robbing homosexual men who would not report such crimes because homosexual acts were illegal at the time. They would use Denovan (a 16-year-old boy) as bait to attract victims. Their modus operandi was for Denovan to approach victims in the park toilets, then lure them to a secluded area of the park by offering a sexual encounter. When the victim was out of public view, Miller would suddenly appear, threatening the victims with violence unless they handed over all their valuables. However, during this particular robbery 48 year old Cremin (a local criminal with a reputation for violence) fought back and was severely beaten over the head with a wooden plank, resulting in his death. The robbers stole various items from Cremin's pockets and hid his body under some bushes, where it was later discovered by a man out walking his dog. The Police launched a murder investigation after a post mortem examination of Cremin's body revealed suspicious injuries,

Miller and Denovan continued to target gay men for some weeks after robbing Cremin. Eventually, Denovan was arrested on 11 August 1960 while committing an "act of indecency" with another man on the Recreation Ground. A newspaper cutting relating to the death of John Cremin was found in Denovan's wallet, which aroused suspicion that he was somehow involved in the crime. Eventually, Denovan confessed to his role in the robbery and implicated Miller, who was subsequently arrested.

== Trial ==
Miller and Denovan's trial began in Glasgow High Court on 14 November 1960. They were charged with the capital murder of John Cremin as well as three other charges of assault and robbery. Miller also faced another charge of assault and robbery committed with two other accomplices while Denovan was also charged with committing an act of indecency. At the end of a three-day trial, Miller was found guilty of capital murder while Denovan was found guilty of non-capital murder. Both verdicts were unanimous and came after only 33 minutes of deliberation by the jury.

As a 19-year-old Miller was legally an adult, and because the murder had taken place during the course of a robbery (Cremin had been robbed of his watch, bankbook and £67), he was eligible for the death penalty under the terms of the Homicide Act 1957. Accordingly, he was sentenced to death by Lord Wheatley, the trial judge. However, as a 16-year-old, Denovan was considered a child by the judicial system and therefore too young to face the death penalty. Consequently, he was sentenced to be detained at Her Majesty's Pleasure.

== Execution ==
The appeals of both Miller and Denovan were dismissed by the Scottish Court of Criminal Appeal in Edinburgh on 7 December 1960 (the date which had originally been set for Miller's execution). A new execution date of 22 December was decided. Miller's family organised a petition to the Secretary of State for Scotland, John Maclay, asking him to recommend a reprieve, with a stall in Glasgow city centre. The petition received 30,000 signatures, but it was turned down.

Miller was hanged on the gallows at 8.02 a.m. on Thursday, 22 December by executioner Harry Allen, assisted by Robert Leslie Stewart. It was the last execution to take place at HMP Barlinnie.

A theatre play about Miller's last days in the condemned cell, Please, Mister (the title comes from Miller's alleged last words on the scaffold), was written by Patrick Harkins and first performed in 2010. The initial production starred Iain De Caestecker (in the role of Miller) and David Hayman.

The last judicial execution in Scotland was that of Henry John Burnett, which took place in Aberdeen on 15 August 1963.
