= Francis Joseph Huchet =

Francis Joseph Huchet (1927 – 9 October 1959) was the last convicted criminal to be executed by hanging in the Channel Islands. He had been sentenced to death on 10 September 1959 by the Deputy Bailiff of Jersey for the murder of John Perrée on the night of 30 March 1959.

== Murder of John Perrée ==
John Perrée, a 45-year-old unmarried labourer from St Brelade, Jersey, was reported missing on 31 March 1959 after having spent the previous evening drinking with Huchet. His body was recovered from a shallow grave on the sand dunes near Mont à la Brune (near St Brelade) on 4 April 1959. The body had been discovered by a young brother and sister, Alan and Ann Heath, who saw a shoe projecting from the sand.

It became clear that Perrée had been shot in the face with a single blast from a shotgun. Once he had been identified, his movements were traced, which led to Huchet who was questioned on 5 April. Huchet admitted drinking with Perrée on the Monday night but told police that he had dropped him off at the traffic lights at Red Houses, after having gone with him to La Pulente Hotel. This was disputed by witnesses, including the landlord, John Callichan, who said that they had seen the two men leave the Horse and Hounds pub and drive off together in Huchet's Hillman car. Police discovered a number of pieces of rope near the crime scene and these matched further pieces found in Huchet's car. A woman's coat and two pairs of jeans found at the scene were traced back to Huchet's wife. Furthermore, tracks in the sand at the crime scene pointed to an attempt to free Huchet's car after it had become bogged down in the dunes. From tyre tracks at the scene it appeared that the car had got stuck in sand and had had to be pulled out by another vehicle. When the murder weapon was discovered it contained traces of sand.

== Trial ==
Huchet was tried at St. Helier from 7 to 10 September before the Deputy Bailiff, Cecil Harrison. 44 witnesses were called, and for the first time in a Jersey murder trial women sat on the 24-strong jury. Witnesses testified that Perrée had been carrying a wallet containing a considerable amount of money on the night of his death. Additionally, the jury were presented with damning forensic evidence which tied Huchet to the crime scene. Finally, Deputy Bailiff Harrison ruled that a bogus confession to the crime (written on the flyleaf of a book and smuggled out of Newgate Street Prison, where Huchet was being held) should be admitted into evidence. The bogus confession (which claimed that the murder had been committed by two men named Jim and Tom) had been accompanied by a covering note, written in Huchet's handwriting and addressed to a Mrs. Grace Kemp, which requested that the ‘confession’ be copied out in ink and forwarded anonymously to the police. Mrs. Kemp instead took the documents to the investigating officers; both items were subsequently shown to the jury, helping to seal Huchet's fate.

On 10 September 1959, after deliberating for 85 minutes, the 24 members of the jury returned a unanimous verdict of guilty. The guilty verdict immediately resulted in Huchet receiving a death sentence, because the law allowed for no other penalty.

== Execution ==
Huchet was hanged on the gallows at Newgate Street Prison, Saint Helier at 7.30 am on 9 October 1959. Harry Allen and two assistants (including Royston Rickard) carried out the execution in the presence of the prison governor, F.J. Moon, Deputy Keith Baal (president of the Prison Board) and other prison officers. An inquest was held at 8.30 am at the General Hospital, during which Dr P. G. Bentlif (prison medical officer) stated that in his opinion death had been instantaneous. A crowd of some 100 people congregated outside the prison and were allegedly disappointed when no notice of execution was posted.

It was the first civil execution in Jersey for over 52 years and only the second execution in Jersey in the 20th century (excluding executions carried out by the German occupying forces in Jersey during the Second World War). Huchet's execution would be the last carried out in Jersey. All further death sentences in Jersey were commuted to life imprisonment until 1986, when the death penalty was abolished.

== See also ==
- Capital punishment in Jersey
