= Capital punishment in Jersey =

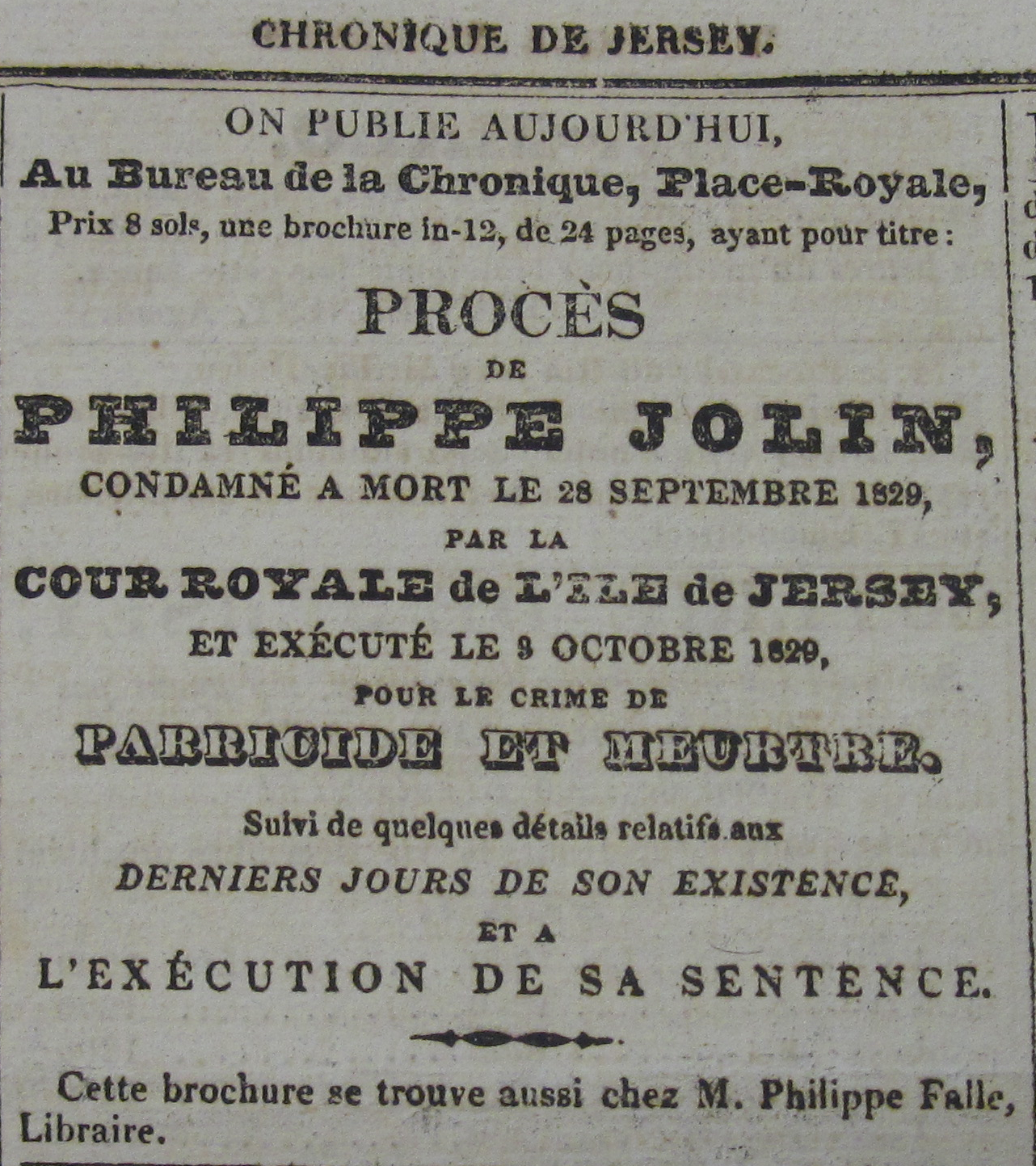
1829 newspaper digest of the trial and execution of Philippe Jolin

The island country of Jersey is a state in which capital punishment has been abolished.

== History ==
Until the 19th century, hangings were carried out on Westmount (French: Mont-Patibulaire (gallows hill); Jèrriais: Mont ès Pendus (hill of the hanged men) in Saint Helier. The last such execution was carried out on 3 October 1829, when Philippe Jolin was hanged for murder.

The following execution, that of François Bradley on 11 October 1866, was carried out in public outside the prison in Saint Helier. The law specified hanging in public until 1907. The next execution, therefore, that of Joseph Philip Le Brun on 12 August 1875, also took place under the same conditions. It was the last public hanging in the British Isles (the United Kingdom had abolished public hangings in 1868).

The death sentence passed on Thomas Connan (executed 19 February 1907) necessitated a law change to permit the hanging to take place within the prison walls. During the German occupation from 1940 to 1945, the occupying forces carried out executions by firing squad. The last execution in Jersey was on 9 October 1959, when Francis Joseph Huchet was hanged for murder.

In Jersey, the last death sentence was passed in 1984, but was commuted to life imprisonment.

== Abolition ==
Capital punishment was abolished by the Homicide (Jersey) Law 1986 in relation to the offence of murder and by the Genocide (Amendment) (Jersey) Law 1987 in relation to the offence of genocide. Technically, the death penalty remained available to a military court, but by the 1986 and 1987 laws the Royal Court of Jersey lost the power of capital sentencing. References to capital punishment in obsolete laws were formally removed by the Criminal Justice (Miscellaneous Provisions) (No. 2) (Jersey) Law 2007.

The Human Rights (Amendment) (Jersey) Order 2006 to give effect to Protocol No. 13 of the European Convention on Human Rights providing for the total abolition of the death penalty. Both of these laws came into effect on 10 December 2006. amended the Human Rights (Jersey) Law 2000
