= Stephen Wade (executioner) =

Stephen Wade (14 December 1887 – 22 December 1956) was one of England's executioners from 1940 until 1955. He assisted Tom and Albert Pierrepoint on 31 occasions and also carried out 28 executions as principal executioner.

One of his first assignments was on 31 October 1942, assisting Albert Pierrepoint in his first execution as a senior, that of Antonio Mancini at HMP Pentonville. After the Second World War, he worked for a time at a coach dealership in his home town of Doncaster. His first execution as principal executioner was the hanging of Arthur Charles at HMP Durham on 26 March 1946. Following this, he was usually selected by the Sheriff of Yorkshire for executions at HMP Armley from 1947 onwards. The execution of Walter Sharpe (aged 20) took place at the prison on 30 March 1950, when he was assisted by Harry Allen.

His final assignment was the execution of Alec Wilkinson (aged 22), whom he hanged at Leeds on 12 August 1955. Wade's assistant at this execution was Robert Leslie Stewart. Wilkinson had been convicted of murdering Clara Farrell, his mother-in-law.

Wade died in Doncaster Royal Infirmary, of stomach cancer, shortly after his 69th birthday.

== See also ==
- Albert Pierrepoint
- Harry Allen
- Robert Leslie Stewart
- Syd Dernley

Bibliography

- Fielding, Steve (2008), The Executioner's Bible, John Blake Publishing, ISBN 978-1-84454-648-0
