= Murder of Thomas Bates =

1962 murder in Birmingham, England

- Date: 18:30, 2 June 1962 (+01:00)
- Location: 196 Lee Bank Road, Lee Bank, Edgbaston, Birmingham, England; 52.469760°N 1.907194°W
- Deaths: Thomas Arthur Bates
- Suspects: Oswald Augustus Grey
- Charges: Capital murder
- Verdict: Guilty

The murder of Thomas Bates occurred during an armed robbery in Birmingham, England, on 2 June 1962. Oswald Grey was convicted of the crime, and became the last person hanged at the city's Winson Green Prison. Grey maintained his innocence and doubt remains as to whether there was sufficient evidence against him.

== Robbery and murder ==
Thomas Arthur Bates
- Born: June 1915; Kings Norton, Birmingham, England
- Died: 2 June 1962; Edgbaston, Birmingham, England
- Cause of death: Gunshot
- Occupation: Newsagent

Thomas Arthur Bates, aged 46, ran a newsagent's shop at 196 Lee Bank Road (now Lee Bank Middleway) in Birmingham's Edgbaston district. At 6:30 pm on Saturday, 2 June 1962, a 19-year-old Jamaican baker called Oswald Augustus Grey, of Cannon Hill Road in that city, carried out a robbery at the shop, during which event he shot Bates in the upper chest. Grey then made his escape by a number 8 (Inner Circle) bus.

Bates' mother, who had been in the living area at the back of the shop, heard the shot and found him collapsed on the floor. Finding him alone in the shop, she initially believed he had suffered a heart attack or stroke. He was reportedly dead before he reached the city's General Hospital, but it was not until he reached there that it was realised that he had been shot. The bullet had passed through his heart, lungs and liver.

== Conviction and appeal ==
Oswald Augustus Grey
- Born: 1942; Colony of Jamaica
- Died: 20 November 1962 (aged 20); Winson Green Prison, Birmingham, England
- Cause of death: Hanging
- Resting place: Winson Green Prison
- Occupation: Baker
- Status: Executed
- Motive: Robbery
- Conviction: Capital murder
- Penalty: Death by hanging

The Birmingham City Police investigation was led by Detective Chief Superintendent Gerald Baumber. Police immediately suspected a robbery, as they found an empty cash tin on the floor, a bullet hole in the wall behind the counter, and a spent cartridge. The Birmingham CID distributed a description of a black man who had been seen outside the shop at the time of the Bates' murder. During a dawn police sweep four days after the murder, the Birmingham police raided several homes in Ladywood and Edgbaston. Several men were arrested, including Grey.

Grey was questioned within four days, and was brought before magistrates on 7 June, charged with stealing a pistol and ammunition from a 60-year-old Handsworth man, Hamilton Bacchus. Grey admitted stealing the gun but insisted he did not shoot anyone.

The next day, Grey was charged with murder, following an identification parade at which he was positively identified by a woman, Cecilia Gibbs, who said that, once the men in the parade tilted their hats as had the suspect, "He was standing in front of me again as on that Saturday."

At his trial at Birmingham Assizes before Mr Justice Paull and a jury, Grey maintained his innocence, claiming to have sold the gun at a party, for £16. Four women testified that he was not the person they had seen at the murder scene. It was also claimed that the police had coerced him into making a confession by force; a claim they denied.

Grey was convicted on 13 October 1962, after the jury deliberated for just 50 minutes, and was immediately sentenced to death. Grey filed for appeal within days. His solicitor, Mr. F. G. Owen, claimed the weight of the evidence against Grey was insufficient for a guilty verdict and death sentence. The English Court of Criminal Appeals, consisting of the Lord Chief Justice Lord Parker of Waddington, Mr. Justice Gorman and Mr. Justice Salmon, dismissed the appeal on 29 October.

== Execution ==
Grey was executed by hanging on the gallows at Winson Green Prison on Tuesday, 20 November 1962 by Harry Allen and his assistant. He was the last person executed there, and in the city. In attendance were prison governor John Richards and prison doctor Dr. P.M. Costa, plus eight uniformed officers and plain-clothed detectives.

A protest against the death penalty took place outside the prison at the time of Grey's execution.
