= Henry John Burnett =

Scottish convicted murderer; last person to be executed by hanging in Scotland (1963)

Jackson Terrace (pictured in 2006)

Henry John Burnett (5 January 1942 – 15 August 1963) was the last man to be hanged in Scotland, and the first in Aberdeen since 1891. He was tried at the high court in Aberdeen from 23 to 25 July 1963 for the murder of merchant seaman Thomas Guyan. His execution, at HM Prison, Craiginches, Aberdeen, was performed by hangman Harry Allen.

== Background ==
On 2 February 1957, Thomas Guyan married Margaret May, and a year later they moved into a first floor flat at 14 Jackson Terrace, Aberdeen, a house owned by May's grandmother Annie Henderson.

A son was born in September 1958, followed by a second in February 1961; however, the father of this second child was not Thomas. This led to marital problems, which came to a head in 1962 when Margaret consulted a solicitor about the possibility of a divorce, which her husband refused. Then, in December of that same year, she went to work at John R. Stephen Fish Curers where she met a new admirer, Henry Burnett.

A relationship soon developed and, by May 1963, Margaret had moved out of Jackson Terrace with her younger son Keith to share a new address in Skene Terrace with Burnett.

== Events of 31 May 1963 ==
Henry Burnett came to believe that, given the chance, Margaret would leave him, so he took to locking her in the house whenever he went out. This was not a state of affairs which Margaret relished, so when by chance she met her estranged husband on 31 May, she agreed to go back to him.

Margaret Guyan arrived at 40 Skene Terrace at 4.00 pm to collect her son Keith. A family friend, Georgina Cattanagh, went with her for moral support. As soon as Margaret announced her intention to go back to her husband, Burnett cried "Margaret, Margaret, you are not going to leave me!" He then drew a knife to Margaret's throat, closing the door behind them.

Fearful of what was happening inside, Cattanagh banged repeatedly on the front door and demanded the release of Margaret. Minutes later, Burnett threw open the door and ran off down the street. Margaret was shaken, but relatively unhurt. The two women made their way back to 14 Jackson Terrace.

Burnett went to his brother Frank's workplace and told him what had happened; his brother urged him to go to the police. But Burnett, still set on revenge, instead went to Frank's house in the city's Bridge of Don area to borrow his brother's shotgun. Because Frank's wife had been told never to lend the gun to anyone, Burnett forced the cabinet open and stole the gun, along with some cartridges, after which he boarded a bus to 14 Jackson Terrace.

He arrived at the Guyans' flat and forced his way in. After Cattanagh screamed "You can't come in here!", Thomas Guyan jumped to his feet to see what the problem was. As he opened the kitchen door, he was met by Burnett, who was carrying the gun. A shot rang out and Guyan fell dead, having been shot in the face at close range. Burnett then took Margaret out of the flat at gun point; on the way down the stairs, he threatened a young boy from a neighbouring flat.

Burnett dragged Margaret down a lane and as far as a garage on Seaforth Road, near the main route north out of Aberdeen. John Innes Irvine was filling his car with petrol at the garage when Burnett demanded his car. Irvine tried to stop Burnett from stealing the car, but was threatened with the shotgun. The police were soon notified of the theft and began following the car, which was driving north towards Peterhead. After driving for about 15 miles, Burnett pulled over near the town of Ellon and offered no resistance as he was arrested by Constable James G. Raeper and Constable Mitchell.

== Trial ==
At his trial, Burnett's defence was that at the time of the crime he was insane or alternatively, that this was a case of diminished responsibility. Both defences failed after the jury had considered the evidence for 25 minutes. The court had heard expert witness evidence from three psychiatrists: A. M. Wylie, the Physician Superintendent of the Royal Cornhill Hospital, Professor Miller and Ian M. Lowit, Consultant Child Psychiatrist, all of whom agreed that Burnett should be reprieved on psychiatric grounds. In letters later sent to The Scotsman newspaper, Miller and Lowit explained that their evidence suggested that Burnett displayed what Miller described as psychopathic tendencies, for which he had received treatment in hospital in the past. It was revealed in Court that he had been violent in the past and had also attempted suicide.

In correspondence with The Scotsman and the Howard League for Penal Reform, it appears that the expert psychiatric evidence was mocked by the press and discounted by the Crown. The argument for capital punishment hinged upon the use of a firearm: murder by firearm was by law a capital offence, in order to deter criminals from deeds like armed robbery; the expert witnesses indicated that Burnett's use of the weapon better fitted an impulsive crime of passion than a crime motivated by the intentions that capital punishment was supposed to deter. His mother and father both appeared in the witness box and his mother broke down in the court. After he was sentenced to death, both his own family and that of the victim petitioned for his reprieve.

However, there was no appeal from Burnett and at 8.00 am on Thursday, 15 August 1963, the 21-year-old was executed on Britain's newest gallows (built in 1962 to Home Office-approved specifications) as a crowd of 200 people gathered outside the prison. Executioner Harry Allen and his assistant Samuel Plant performed the hanging. Shortly afterwards, Burnett's body was buried in an unmarked grave within the walls of the prison, as was customary.

Craiginches Prison closed in January 2014 and the grounds were ear-marked for redevelopment. In early August 2014 the remains of Burnett were exhumed from the prison and taken to Aberdeen Crematorium, where a private ceremony was held on 7 August.

== See also ==
- Capital punishment in the United Kingdom
- John Alan West, whose murder led to the last executions in the UK, in 1964.
