= HM Prison Aberdeen =

Demolished prison in Scotland

HMP Aberdeen
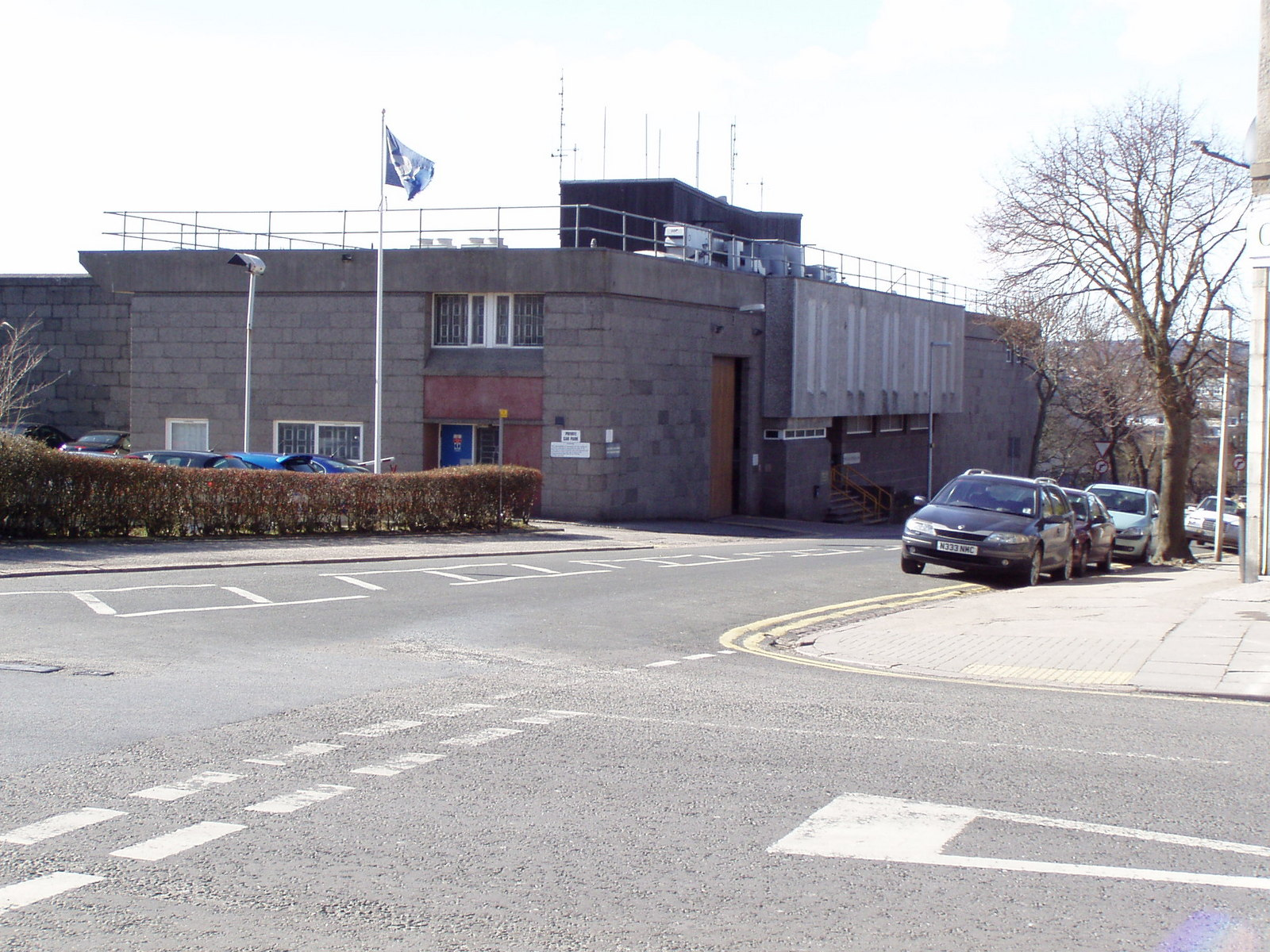
- Prison entrance in 2010
- Interactive map of HMP Aberdeen
- Location: Aberdeen, Scotland; 57°7′58.2″N 2°5′38″W
- Status: Demolished
- Capacity: 155
- Opened: 1890
- Closed: 11 January 2014
- Former name: Craiginches
- Managed by: Scottish Prison Service
- Website: Official website (archived 2013)

Notable prisoners
- Henry John Burnett

HM Prison Aberdeen (formerly known as Craiginches) was a medium-security prison, located in the city of Aberdeen, Scotland. The prison was managed by the Scottish Prison Service. Known as one of the most overcrowded prisons in Scotland, it had a design capacity of 155 and was contracted to hold up to 230 prisoners. However, on the first day of an inspection in January 2009 it held 264 prisoners. In 2014, it was closed in favour of the new HMP Grampian and the site was redeveloped as a housing estate.

Henry John Burnett, the last man to be executed in Scotland, was hanged inside the prison on 15 August 1963.

== See also ==
- List of prisons in the United Kingdom
