= Bernard Spilsbury =

English pathologist (1877–1947)

Sir Bernard Spilsbury
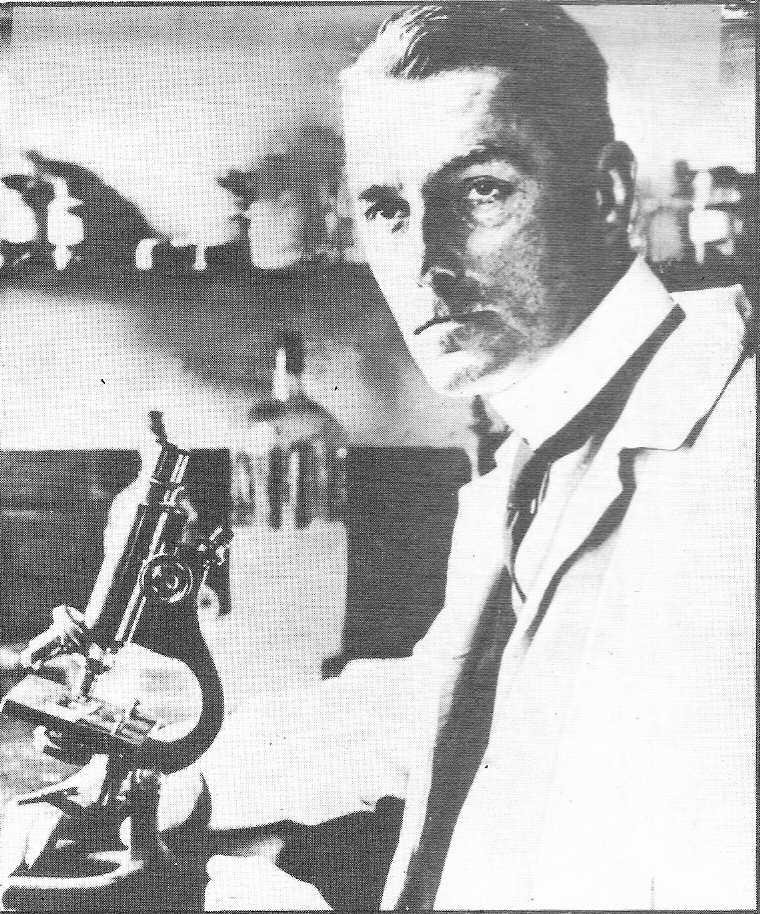
- Photograph of Spilsbury taken in the 1920s.
- Born: 16 May 1877; Leamington Spa, Warwickshire, England
- Died: 17 December 1947 (aged 70); London, England
- Education: Magdalen College, Oxford
- Spouse: Edith Caroline Horton (m. 1908)
- Scientific career
- Fields: Pathology

Sir Bernard Henry Spilsbury (16 May 1877 – 17 December 1947) was an English pathologist. His cases include Hawley Crippen, the Seddon case, the Major Armstrong poisoning, the "Brides in the Bath" murders by George Joseph Smith, the Crumbles murders, the Podmore case, the Sidney Harry Fox matricide, the Vera Page case, and the murder trials of Louis Voisin, Jean-Pierre Vaquier, Norman Thorne, Donald Merrett, Alfred Rouse, Elvira Barney, Toni Mancini, and Gordon Cummins. Spilsbury's courtroom appearances became legendary for his demeanour of effortless dominance.

He also played a crucial role in the development of Operation Mincemeat, a deception operation during the Second World War which saved thousands of lives of Allied service personnel. Spilsbury died by suicide in 1947.

== Personal life ==
Spilsbury was born on 16 May 1877 at 35 Bath Street, Leamington Spa, Warwickshire. He was the eldest of the four children of James Spilsbury, a manufacturing chemist, and his wife, Marion Elizabeth Joy.

On 3 September 1908, Spilsbury married Edith Caroline Horton. They had four children together: one daughter, Evelyn and three sons, Alan, Peter and Richard. Peter, a junior doctor at St Thomas's Hospital in Lambeth, was killed in the Blitz in 1940, while Alan died of tuberculosis in 1945, shortly after the Second World War.

The deaths (of Peter, in particular) were a blow from which Spilsbury never truly recovered. Depression over his finances and his declining health are believed to have been a key factor in his decision to take his own life by gas in his laboratory at University College, London, in 1947.

== Career ==
Educated at Magdalen College, Oxford, he took a Bachelor of Arts degree in natural science in 1899, an MB BCh in 1905 and a Master of Arts in 1908. He also studied at St Mary's Hospital in Paddington, London, partly under William Willcox, from 1899. He specialised in the then-new science of forensic pathology.

In October 1905, he was appointed resident assistant pathologist at St Mary's Hospital when the London County Council requested all general hospitals in its area appoint two qualified pathologists to perform autopsies following sudden deaths. In this capacity, he worked closely with coroners such as Bentley Purchase.

=== Noteworthy cases ===
The case that brought Spilsbury to public attention was that of Hawley Harvey Crippen in 1910, where he gave forensic evidence as to the likely identity of the human remains found in Crippen's house. Spilsbury concluded that a scar on a small piece of skin from the remains pointed to Mrs Crippen as the victim.

Spilsbury later gave evidence at the trial of Herbert Rowse Armstrong, the solicitor convicted of poisoning his wife with arsenic.

The case that consolidated Spilsbury's reputation as Britain's foremost forensic pathologist was the "Brides in the Bath" murder trial in 1915. Three women had died mysteriously in their baths; in each case, the death appeared to be an accident. George Joseph Smith was brought to trial for the murder of one of these women, Bessie Mundy. Spilsbury testified that since Mundy's thigh showed evidence of goose bumps and, since she was, in death, clutching a bar of soap, it was certain that she had died a violent death – in other words, had been murdered.

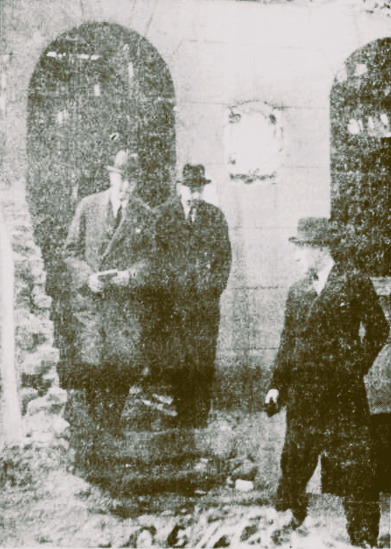
Sir Bernard Spilsbury (left), pictured at the crime scene of the murder of Maple Churchyard. 13 October 1941.

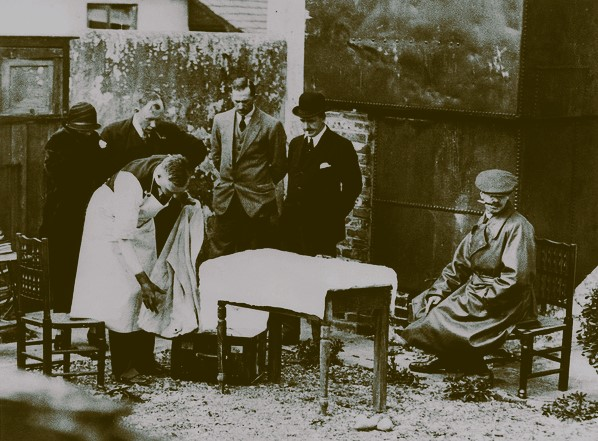
Spilsbury (foreground), pictured at the scene of the second of the Crumbles murders — that of Emily Kaye. 4 May 1924.

Spilsbury was also involved in the Brighton trunk murder cases. Although the man accused of the second murder, Tony Mancini (real name Cecil Louis England), was acquitted, he confessed to the killing in 1976 just before his own death, vindicating Spilsbury's evidence.

Spilsbury was able to work with minimal remains, such as those involved in the Alfred Rouse case (the "Blazing Car Murder"). Here, a near-destroyed body was found in the wreck of a burnt-out car near Northampton in 1930. Although the victim was never identified, Spilsbury was able to give evidence of how he had died and facilitate Rouse's conviction.

During his career, Spilsbury performed thousands of autopsies, not only of murder victims but also of executed criminals. He was able to appear for the defence in Scotland, where his status as a Home Office pathologist in England and Wales was irrelevant: he testified for the defence in the case of Donald Merrett, tried in February 1927 for the murder of his mother and acquitted as not proven.

Spilsbury was knighted early in 1923. He was a Home Office-approved pathologist and lecturer in forensic medicine at the University College Hospital, the London School of Medicine for Women and at St Thomas's Hospital. He also was a Fellow of the Royal Society of Medicine.

In later years, Spilsbury's dogmatic manner and his unbending belief in his own infallibility gave rise to criticism. Judges began to express concern about his invincibility in court and recent researches have indicated that his inflexible dogmatism led to miscarriages of justice.

On 17 July 2008, files containing notes on deaths investigated by Spilsbury were auctioned at Sotheby's and were acquired by the Wellcome Library in London. The files' index cards documented deaths in the County of London and the Home Counties from 1905 to 1932. The hand-written cards, discovered in a lost cabinet, were the notes that Spilsbury apparently accumulated for a textbook on forensic medicine which he was planning, but there is no evidence that he ever started the book.

== Legacy ==
Spilsbury, together with personnel from Scotland Yard, was responsible for devising the so-called murder bag, the kit containing plastic gloves, tweezers, evidence bags, etc., that detectives attending the scene of a suspicious death are now equipped with.

Spilsbury is commemorated by an English Heritage blue plaque attached to his former home at Marlborough Hill in north London, and another at his birthplace, 35 Bath Street, Leamington Spa, which was his father's chemist shop and is still a chemist shop today.

=== Media ===
Spilsbury appears as a character in several Solar Pons stories by August Derleth, including "The Haunted Library," "The Blind Clairaudent," "The Mazarine Blue," and "The Seven Sisters." The Hawley Crippen case is specifically mentioned in "From the Notebooks of Dr. Lyndon Parker."

Spilsbury is mentioned in the Severed Heads song 'Dead Eyes Opened' by the narrator, Edgar Lustgarten as 'a great pathologist with unique experience'. The song uses Edgar Wallace's transcription of Patrick Herbert Mahon's trial for the murder of his lover Emily Beilby Kaye.

In the 1956 film The Man Who Never Was, about Operation Mincemeat, André Morell played Spilsbury.

The BBC science documentary series Horizon cast a critical eye on Spilsbury's work in the 1970 episode The Expert Witness.

In the 1976 Thames Television series Killers, Spilsbury was played in three episodes by Derek Waring.

Spilsbury was played by Andrew Johns in the 1980–81 TV series Lady Killers produced by Granada Television.

In P.D. James' 1986 mystery novel, "A Taste for Death," a character who is a forensic pathologist is said to be "getting dangerously infallible with juries. We don't want another Spilsbury."

Nicholas Selby played Spilsbury in the 1994 mini-series Dandelion Dead, a dramatisation of the Armstrong poisoning case.

On 12 June 2008, BBC Radio 4's Afternoon Drama play, The Incomparable Witness by Nichola McAuliffe, was a drama about the involvement of "Sir Bernard Spilsbury, the father of modern forensics" in the Crippen case as seen from the point of view of Spilsbury's wife, Edith. The radio play was directed by Sasha Yevtushenko with Timothy Watson as Spilsbury, Joanna David as Edith, Honeysuckle Weeks as the young Edith and John Rowe (who played Spilsbury in an episode of the short-lived 1984 BBC Scotland TV series Murder Not Proven?) as the Lord Chief Justice.

In the 2019 musical Operation Mincemeat Jak Malone originated the role of Spilsbury. Christian Andrews, Jonty Peach, Seán Carey and Colm Gleason have played the role in the West End. Malone reprised the role on Broadway in 2025.

In 2019 the BBC1 series Murder, Mystery and My Family concluded that the conviction of the then 15-year-old Jack Hewitt (1907–1972) for the murder at Gallowstree Common of Sarah Blake (1877–1922) was unsafe, partly due to Spilsbury's misleading evidence to the jury about the putative murder weapon.

Also in 2019 the same series Murder, Mystery and My Family concluded that the 1929 conviction of Sidney Fox for matricide was unsafe, partly due to Spilsbury's misleading evidence to the jury about the cause of death of Fox’s mother.

== Posthumous reputation ==
During Spilsbury's lifetime, and as early as 1925 after the murder conviction of Norman Thorne, concern began to be expressed by informed opinion about his domination of the courtroom and about the quality of his methodology. The influential Law Journal expressed 'profound disquiet' at the verdict, noting 'the more than Papal infallibility with which Sir Bernard Spilsbury is rapidly being invested by juries.'

In more recent years, there has been some reassessment of Spilsbury's reputation, which has raised questions over his degree of objectivity. Sydney Smith judged Spilsbury 'very brilliant and very famous, but fallible...and very, very obstinate.' Keith Simpson wrote of Spilsbury 'whose positive evidence had doubtless led to conviction at trials that might have ended with sufficient doubt for acquittal.' Burney and Pemberton (2010) noted how the "virtuosity" of Spilsbury's performances in the mortuary and the courtroom "threatened to undermine the foundations of forensic pathology as a modern and objective specialism."

He has in particular been criticised for his insistence on working alone, his refusal to train students, and an unwillingness to engage in academic research or peer review. This, according to the article, "lent him an aura of infallibility that for many raised concerns that it was his celebrity rather than his science that persuaded juries to credit his evidence over all others."

== See also ==
- Francis Camps

== Sources ==
- Wilson, Colin; Pitman, Patricia (1984). Encyclopedia of Murder. Pan Books. ISBN 0-330-28300-6.
- Jane Robins, The Magnificent Spilsbury and the Case of the Brides in the Bath, John Murray, London, 2010.
- Douglas Browne and E. V. Tullett, Bernard Spilsbury: His Life and Cases, 1951.
- Colin Evans, The Father of Forensics, Berkley (Penguin USA), 2006, ISBN 0-425-21007-3.
- J. H. H. Gaute and Robin Odell, The New Murderer's Who's Who, Harrap Books, London, 1996.
- Andrew Rose, Lethal Witness, Sutton Publishing (2007) and Kent State University Press.
- Craddock, Jeremy (2022) [2021]. The Jigsaw Murders: The True Story of the Ruxton Killings and the Birth of Modern Forensics. Cheltenham: The History Press. ISBN 978-0-750-99767-6.
