= Notable Scottish Trials =

Notable Scottish Trials was a series of books originally published by William Hodge and Company of Edinburgh, Scotland. Each volume dealt with a single case, beginning with a scholarly introduction to provide an overview of the case, followed by a verbatim account of the trial, concluding with appendices with additional material about the case. The series first appeared in 1905, with the publication of the Trial of Madeleine Smith, edited by A. Duncan Smith, at the price of five shillings (this edition was re-issued in 1927, with a new introduction by F. Tennyson Jesse).

The series of books, with their distinctive green cloth covers and gilt lettering, became so successful that Hodge began to publish a new series of trial accounts in 1911 under the series name of Notable English Trials. These trial accounts were published in red cloth covers with gilt lettering to differentiate it from the earlier Scottish trial series. In 1921, the two series were merged into Notable British Trials and the red binding and gilt lettering became the uniform identifying feature. Between the wars cheaper editions were also sold bound in red cloth with black lettering. The general editor for the series was James H. Hodge. Nine titles were also issued in a series of War Crimes Trials. Since 2017 the main series has been revived by the UK publisher Mango Books, with original titles being reissued and new trials added.

== List of series titles ==
(by order of trial date)

- 1586: Trial of Mary Queen of Scots, edited by A. Francis Steuart (pub. 1923; 2nd ed. 1951)
- 1605-6: Trial of Guy Fawkes and Others, edited by Donald Carswell (1934)
- 1649: Trial of King Charles the First, edited by J. G. Muddiman (1928)
- 1685: The Bloody Assizes, edited by J. G. Muddiman (1929)
- 1701: Trial of Captain Kidd, edited by Graham Brooks (1930)
- 1724: Trial of Jack Sheppard, edited by Horace Bleackley (1933)
- 1736: Trial of Captain Porteous, edited by William Roughead (1909)
- 1743: The Annesley Case, edited by Andrew Lang (1912)
- 1747: Trial of Simon, Lord Lovat of the '45, edited by David N. Mackay (1911)
- 1752: Trial of Mary Blandy, edited by William Roughead (1914)
- 1752: Trial of James Stewart (The Appin Murder), edited by David N. Mackay (1907; 2nd ed. 1931)
- 1759: Trial of Eugene Aram, edited by Eric R. Watson (1913)
- 1765: Trial of Katharine Nairn, edited by William Roughead (1926)
- 1761-9: The Douglas Cause, edited by A. Francis Steuart (1909)
- 1776: Trial of the Duchess of Kingston, edited by Lewis Melville (1927)
- 1788: Trial of Deacon Brodie, edited by William Roughead (1914; 3rd ed. 1921)
- 1792: The Court-Martial of Bounty Mutineers, edited by Owen Rutter (1931)
- 1815: Trial of Eliza Fenning, edited by Kate Clarke (2021)
- 1817: Trial of Abraham Thornton, edited by Sir John Hall (1926)
- 1820: Trial of Henry Hunt and Others: The Peterloo Massacre, edited by Caitlin Kitchener (2021)
- 1824: Trial of Henry Fauntleroy and Other Famous Trials for Forgery, edited by Horace Bleackley (1924)
- 1824: Trial of Thurtell and Hunt, edited by Eric. R. Watson (1920)
- 1828: Burke and Hare, edited William Roughead (1921; 2nd ed. 1948)
- 1849: Trial of James Blomfield Rush, edited by W. Teignmouth Shore (1928)
- 1849: Trial of the Mannings, edited by Linda Stratmann (2022)
- 1856: Trial of William Palmer, edited by George H. Knott; Eric R. Watson (1912; 3rd ed. 1952)
- 1858: Trial of Madeleine Smith, edited by A. Duncan Smith; F. Tennyson Jesse (1905; 3rd ed. 1949)
- 1859: Trial of Dr. Smethurst, edited by Leonard A. Parry (1931)
- 1862: Trial of Jessie M'Lachlan, edited by William Roughead (1911; 3rd ed. 1950)
- 1864: Trial of Franz Muller, edited by H. B. Irving (1911)
- 1865: Trial of Dr. Pritchard, edited by William Roughead (1906; 2nd ed. 1925)
- 1867: Trial of Frederick Baker, edited by David Green (2021)
- 1872: Trial of Christiana Edmunds, edited by Kate Clarke (2021)
- 1875: Trial of the Wainwrights, edited by H. B. Irving (1920)
- 1877: Trial of the Stauntons, edited J. B. Atlay (1911; 2nd ed. 1952)
- 1878: Trial of Eugene Marie Chantrelle, edited by A. Duncan Smith (1906; 2nd ed. 1928)
- 1879: Trial of Kate Webster, edited by Elliott O'Donnell (1925)
- 1879: Trial of the City of Glasgow Bank Directors, edited by William Wallace (1905)
- 1879: Trials of Charles Frederick Peace, edited by W. Teignmouth Shore (1926)
- 1881: Trial of Percy Lefroy Mapleton, edited by Adam Wood (2019)
- 1882: Trial of George Henry Lamson, edited by H. L. Adam (1913; 2nd ed. 1951)
- 1886: Trial of Adelaide Bartlett, edited by Sir John Hall (1927)
- 1887: Trial of Israel Lipski, edited by M. W. Oldridge (2017)
- 1889: Trial of Mrs. Maybrick, edited by H. B. Irving (1912; 2nd ed. 1927)
- 1889: Trial of John Watson Laurie (The Arran Murder), edited by William Roughead (1932)
- 1891: The Baccarat Case: Gordon-Cumming v. Wilson and Others, edited by W. Teignmouth Shore (1932)
- 1892: Trial of Thomas Neill Cream, edited by W. Teignmouth Shore (1923)
- 1893: Trial of A. J. Monson, edited by John W. More (1908; 2nd ed. 1921)
- 1895: Trials of Oscar Wilde, edited by H. Montgomery Hyde (1948; 5th imp. 1960)
- 1899: Trial of Louise Masset, edited by Kate Clarke (2018)
- 1903: Trial of William Gardiner (The Peasenhall Case), edited by William Henderson (1934)
- 1903: Trial of Gustav Rau, Otto Monsson and Willem Smith: The Veronica Trial, edited by G. W. Keeton and John Cameron (1952)
- 1903: Trial of George Chapman, edited by H. L. Adam (1930)
- 1903: Trial of Samuel Herbert Dougal, edited by F. Tennyson Jesse (1928)
- 1904: Trial of Adolf Beck, edited by Eric R. Watson (1924)
- 1907: Trial of Robert Wood (The Camden Town Case) (1936)
- 1909-28: Trial of Oscar Slater, edited by William Roughead (1910; 4th ed. 1950)
- 1910: Trial of Hawley Harvey Crippen, edited by Filson Young (1920; 2nd ed. 1950)
- 1910: Trial of John Alexander Dickman, edited by S. O. Rowan-Hamilton (1914; 2nd ed. 1926)
- 1911: Trial of Steinie Morrison, edited by H. Fletcher Moulton (1922)
- 1912: Trial of the Seddons, edited by Filson Young (1914; 2nd ed. 1952)
- 1915: Trial of George Joseph Smith, edited by Eric R. Watson (1922; 2nd ed. 1949)
- 1916: Trial of Sir Roger Casement, edited by George H. Knott; W. Teignmouth Shore; H. Montgomery Hyde (1917; 3rd ed. 1960)
- 1920: Trial of Harold Greenwood, edited by Winifred Duke (1930)
- 1920: Trial of Field and Gray, edited by Winifred Duke (1939)
- 1920: Trial of Ronald Light: The Green Bicycle Case, edited by Sally Smith (2021)
- 1922: Trial of Frederick Bywaters and Edith Thompson, edited by Filson Young (1923; 2nd ed. 1951)
- 1922: Trial of Ronald True, edited by Donald Carswell (1925; 2nd ed. 1950)
- 1922: Trial of Herbert Rowse Armstrong, edited by Filson Young (1927)
- 1924: Trial of Jean Pierre Vaquier, edited by R. H. Blundell (1929)
- 1925: Trial of Norman Thorne, edited by Paul Worsley KC (2023)
- 1927: Trial of John Donald Merrett, edited by William Roughead (1929)
- 1928: Trial of Frederick Guy Browne and William Henry Kennedy, edited by W. Shore Teignmouth (1930)
- 1928: Trial of Benjamin Knowles, edited by Albert Lieck (1933)
- 1930: Trial of Sidney Harry Fox, edited by F. Tennyson Jesse (1934)
- 1931: Trial of Alfred Arthur Rouse, edited by Helena Normanton (1931)
- 1931: The Royal Mail Case: Rex v. Lord Kylsant and Another, edited by Collin Brooks (1933)
- 1934: Trial of Jeannie Donald, edited by J. G. Wilson (1953)
- 1935: Trial of Alma Victoria Rattenbury and George Percy Stoner, edited by F. Tennyson Jesse (1935; 2nd ed. 1950)
- 1936: Trial of Buck Ruxton, edited by R. H. Blundell and G. Haswell Wilson (1937; 2nd ed. 1950)
- 1937: Trials of Frederick Nodder, edited by Winifred Duke (1950)
- 1938-46: Trials of Patrick Carraher, edited by George Blake (1951)
- 1939: Trial of Peter Barnes and Others (The I.R.A. Coventry Explosion of 1939), edited by Letitia Fairfield (1953)
- 1943: Trial of August Sangret, edited by MacDonald Critchley (1959)
- 1945: Trial of William Joyce, edited by J. W. Hall (1946)
- 1946: Trial of Neville George Clevely Heath, edited by MacDonald Critchley (1951; 2nd imp. 1955)
- 1947: Trial of Thomas John Ley and Lawrence John Smith (The Chalk Pit Murder), edited by F. Tennyson Jesse (1947)
- 1948: Trial of James Camb (The Port-hole Murder), edited by Geoffrey Clark (1949)
- 1948: Trial of Peter Griffiths (The Blackburn Baby Murder), edited by George Godwin (1950)
- 1949: Trial of John George Haigh (The Acid Bath Murder), edited by Lord Dunboyne (1953)
- 1951-52: Trial of John Thomas Straffen, edited by Letitia Fairfield and Eric P. Fullbrook (1954)
- 1952: Trial of Christopher Craig and Derek William Bentley, edited by H. Montgomery Hyde (1954)
- 1953: Trials of Timothy John Evans and John Reginald Halliday Christie, edited by F. Tennyson Jesse (1957)

=== War Crimes Trials ===
(in volume order)

- Vol. I: Trial of Heinz Eck, August Hoffmann, Walter Weisspfennig, Hans Richard Lenz and Wolfgang Schwender (The Peleus Trial), edited by John Cameron (1948)
- Vol. II: Trial of Josef Kramer and Forty-Four Others (The Belsen Trial), edited by Raymond Phillips (1949)
- Vol. III: Trial of Gozawa Sadaichi and Nine Others, edited by Colin Sleeman (1948)
- Vol. IV: Trial of Alfons Klein, Adolf Wahlmann, Heinrich Ruoff, Karl Willig, Adolf Merkle, Irmgard Huber and Philipp Blum (The Hadamar Trial), edited by Earl W. Kintner (1949)
- Vol. V: Trial of Wolfgang Zeuss, Magnus Wochner, Emil Meier, Peter Straub, Fritz Hartjenstein, Franz Berg, Werner Rohde, Emil Bruttel, Kurt Aus Dem Bruch and Harberg (The Natzweiler Trial), edited by Anthony M. Webb (1949)
- Vol. VI: Trial of Nikolaus von Falkenhorst. Formerly Generaloberst in the German Army, edited by E. H. Stevens (1949)
- Vol. VII: Trial of Heinrich Gerike, Georg Hessling, Werner Noth, Hermann Muller, Gustav Claus, Richard Demmerich, Fritz Flint, Valentina Bilien (The Velpke Baby Home Trial), edited by George Brand (1950)
- Vol. VIII: Trial of Sumida Haruzo and Twenty Others (The Double Tenth Trial), edited by Colin Sleeman (1951)
- Vol. IX: Trial of Erich Killinger, Heinz Junge, Otto Boehringer, Heinrich Eberhardt, Gustav Bauer-Schlichtegroll (The Dulag Luft Trial), edited by Eric Cuddon (1952)
