= Tullett =

Tullett is a surname. Notable people with the surname include:

- Ed Tullett, English producer and songwriter
- Hayley Tullett (born 1973), Welsh middle-distance runner
- Tom Tullett (1915–1991), also known as E. V. Tullett, British journalist

== See also ==
- Tullett Prebon, money brokerage founded by Derek Tullett in 1971
