= Jean-Pierre Vaquier =

French inventor and murderer (1879–1924)

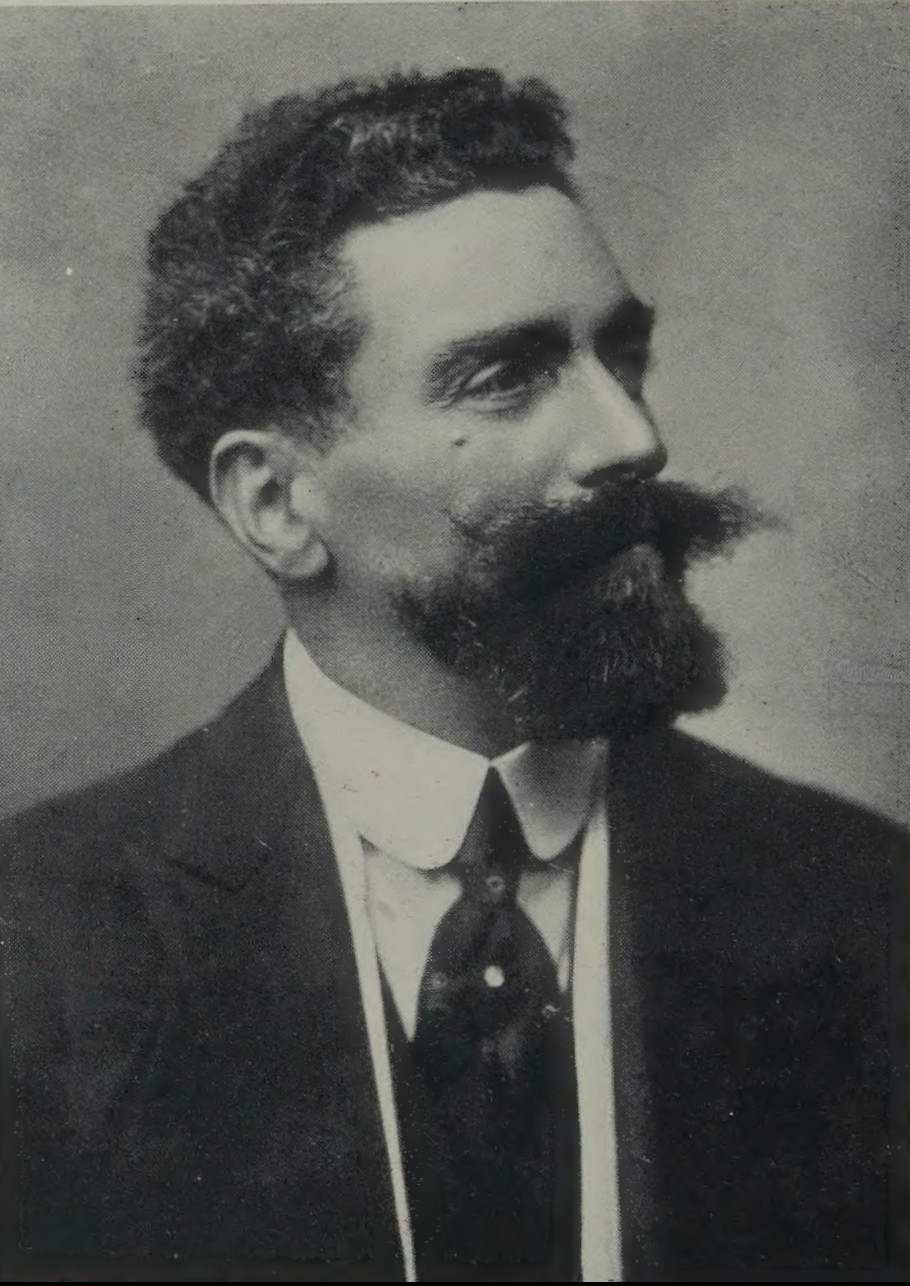
- Born: July 14, 1879; Niort-de-Sault, France
- Died: August 12, 1924 (aged 45); HM Prison Wandsworth, London, England
- Cause of death: Execution by hanging
- Conviction: Murder
- Penalty: Death

Jean-Pierre Vaquier (14 July 1879 – 12 August 1924) was a French inventor and murderer. He was convicted in Britain of murdering the husband of his mistress by poisoning him with strychnine.

Vaquier was born in Niort-de-Sault on Bastille Day, 1879. In 1924, he was working as a lecturer in radio-telephony, when he met Mabel Jones in Biarritz; she had gone there to recover from a breakdown. He spoke no English and she spoke no French, so they conducted their affair through the medium of a dictionary.

When Jones returned to Byfleet, Vaquier followed and took up residence in the Blue Anchor pub in Byfleet, which Jones ran with her husband, Alfred George Poynter Jones. He said that he planned to market a new sausage-making machine he had patented. On the morning of 29 March Alfred Jones came downstairs and took his habitual glass of Bromo-Seltzer as a hangover remedy from a bottle in the bar parlour, where Vaquier had already been sitting for some time. Jones immediately became ill and died shortly afterwards. His doctor carried out a post-mortem and strychnine was found in the body and in the bottle. A second post-mortem was carried out by Sir Bernard Spilsbury. Vaquier was arrested three weeks later and a chemist in London identified him as the customer who had bought 0.12 grams (2 grains) of strychnine, signing the poisons book as "J. Wanker" [sic].

The trial took place in July 1924 at Guildford Assizes before Mr. Justice Avory, with Sir Patrick Hastings as Attorney General (who traditionally prosecuted in person in poisoning cases) and Sir Edward Marshall Hall for the prosecution; Vaquier was defended by Henry Curtis Bennett. He was found guilty and hanged by Robert Baxter at HM Prison Wandsworth.

== Bibliography ==
- Blundell, R. H.; Seaton, R. E. (1929). Trial of Jean Pierre Vaquier. Notable British Trials. Edinburgh: William Hodge & Co.
- Douglas G. Browne; E. V. Tullett (1955). "More poisoning cases". Bernard Spilsbury: his life and cases. Harmondsworth: Penguin Books. pp. 235–243.
- Edward Grice (1937). "The Vainest Murderer". Great cases of Sir Henry Curtis Bennett, K.C. Hutchinson. p. 26.
- B. O’Donnell (1935). The Trials of Mr Justice Avory. p. 190.
