= Messiter =

Messiter is a surname. Notable people with the surname include:

- Ian Messiter (1920–1999), British radio producer
- Malcolm Messiter (born 1949), British oboist
- Vivian Messiter, victim in the 1929 Podmore case
