= Murder bag =

Forensics kit used by British police

A murder bag is a forensics kit used by police officers at crime scenes. It was developed by Sir Bernard Spilsbury, a British forensic pathologist known for his work on the Hawley Harvey Crippen case in conjunction with Scotland Yard in 1924.

The need for such a kit became apparent during the investigation into the Patrick Mahon murder case of 1924. The murder scene was particularly gruesome for the time period, as Mahon had carved his victim, Emily Kaye, into several pieces and attempted to burn them. After the burning had proved unsuccessful, Mahon boiled the body parts, and was later caught for throwing small pieces of the body out of a train. Spilsbury was called to the scene to aid in locating and identifying several missing pieces. When he arrived, Spilsbury discovered a detective using his bare hands to scoop up bloodied flesh and deposit them in a bucket. When questioned about why he was not wearing rubber gloves for the task, the officer replied that he never wore gloves, and that no one he knew had since the formation of the murder squad seventeen years ago. After returning to Scotland Yard, Spilsbury reported what he had discovered to the then head of the murder squad, Detective Superintendent William Brown, who proposed a standardised kit to be provided to officers in the field.

The subsequently produced kit was carried by all detectives responding to a homicide, and contained rubber gloves, tweezers, evidence bags, magnifying glass, compass, ruler and swabs. The kit changed as needed to keep pace with changing advances in forensics.

== In popular culture ==
- The term "murder bag" became fairly recognisable to the British public after its use as the title of a popular television series running from 1957 to 1959.
- In Venture Bros, the character Dr Henry Killenger uses a "magic murder bag" a version of the bag with mysterious properties.
