= Herbert Rowse Armstrong =

English solicitor and convicted murderer (1869–1922)

Major Herbert Rowse Armstrong
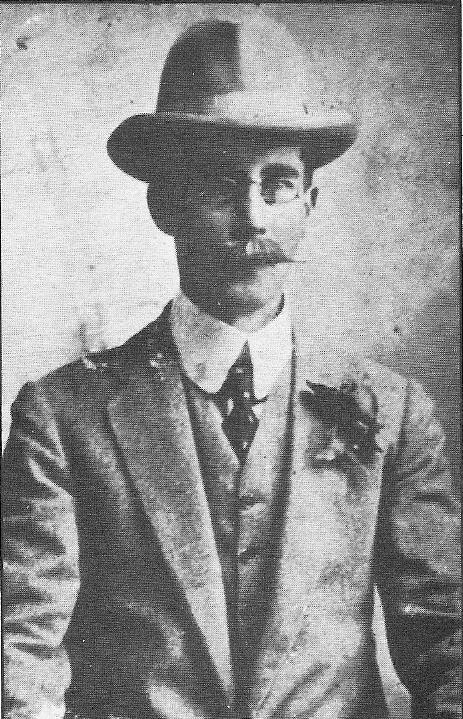
- Armstrong c. 1915
- Born: 13 May 1869; Plymouth, Devon, England
- Died: 31 May 1922 (aged 53); Gloucester Prison, Gloucester, England
- Cause of death: Execution by hanging
- Education: St Catharine's College, Cambridge
- Occupation: Solicitor
- Criminal charge: Murder
- Criminal penalty: Death
- Spouse: Katharine Mary Friend (m. 1907)
- Children: Three
- Military career
- Allegiance: United Kingdom
- Branch: British Army
- Rank: Major
- Unit: Royal Engineers
- Conflicts: World War I
- Awards: Territorial Decoration

Herbert Rowse Armstrong TD (13 May 1869 – 31 May 1922) was an English solicitor and convicted murderer, the only solicitor in the United Kingdom ever hanged for murder. He was living in Cusop Dingle, Herefordshire, England, and practising in Hay-on-Wye, on the border of England and Wales, from 1906 until his arrest on 31 December 1921 for the attempted murder of a professional rival by arsenic poisoning. He was later also charged with, and convicted of, the murder of his wife, the crime for which he was executed.

== Early life and career ==
Armstrong was born at 23 Princes Square, Plymouth, Devon, on 13 May 1869 to a family of modest means. The family later moved to Edge Hill, Liverpool. He was admitted as a sizar to St Catharine's College, Cambridge, in 1887, gaining a BA degree in law, and qualified as a solicitor in February 1895. He gained an MA (Cantab.) from St Catharine's in 1901. Initially practising in Liverpool, later Newton Abbot, he successfully applied for a vacancy in Hay-on-Wye, Breconshire, in 1906. The following year, he married Katharine Mary Friend of West Teignmouth; the couple had two girls, Eleanor and Margaret, and a boy, Pierson.

The Armstrong family moved into an imposing family home called Mayfield in the village of Cusop Dingle not far from Hay where Armstrong ran his law firm of Cheese & Armstrong. Armstrong was a hard-working man and rose in the social community of the town. He was appointed clerk to the justices. He joined the Volunteer Force and rose to the rank of captain. In 1914 he was called up in the First World War, where he eventually gained the rank of major in the Royal Engineers Territorial Force, and served in France, May to October 1918. After the war, he was usually referred to as "Major Armstrong".

== Death of Mrs Armstrong ==
In May 1919, Katharine Armstrong's health first began to weaken, with certain symptoms that the local physician, Dr Thomas Hincks, diagnosed as a case of brachial neuritis. From this she appeared to recover, and did not need to consult Hincks for over a year. But in August 1920, Mrs Armstrong's health, both physical and mental, deteriorated again. Armstrong kept in close contact with Hincks, and showed great concern for his wife, consulting relatives and friends as well. Hincks found that Mrs Armstrong was showing signs of mental collapse and came to the conclusion that it was connected to her illness. At the end of August, Mrs Armstrong was admitted to Barnwood, a private mental asylum near Gloucester. On admission she had pyrexia, vomiting, heart murmurs, and albumen in the urine. There was also partial paralysis in the hands and feet and loss of muscle tone. Mrs Armstrong was also delusional.

Mrs Armstrong's condition began to improve at Barnwood, and she was discharged home on 22 January 1921. Shortly after her return home her condition deteriorated again and she died a month after her return on 22 February 1921 at the age of 48. Hincks was puzzled by Mrs Armstrong's symptoms, but nevertheless stated on the death certificate that she had died of gastritis, aggravated by heart disease and nephritis. Outwardly, Armstrong had shown nothing but forbearing concern for his wife, sitting at her bedside reading to her in the evenings, and leaving the office early whenever possible to be with her.

It would seem that there had been problems in the marriage. Though authors who have studied the case have assumed that the Armstrongs' marriage was a failure due to the domineering attitude of Mrs Armstrong to her husband, the precise nature of the Armstrongs' relationship is far from clear. It was generally held that Mrs Armstrong was a singularly unpleasant woman who regularly abused and humiliated her husband in public, and it did not go unnoticed that, though the local newspaper described Mrs Armstrong as a 'popular Hay lady,' few people attended her funeral. On the other hand, Mrs Armstrong, whenever separated from her husband due either to her stays in hospitals or to his service in the War, is reported to have expressed her desire for the family to be reunited at the earliest opportunity.

Whatever the truth, service in the First World War had opened up new experiences for the Major and he had had several affairs. He also went to dances in Hay and made passes at local girls. On the day of Mrs Armstrong's death, the servants closed all the curtains as a mark of respect. The first thing that Armstrong did on returning home from the office was to open them again.

== Attempted murder of Oswald Martin ==
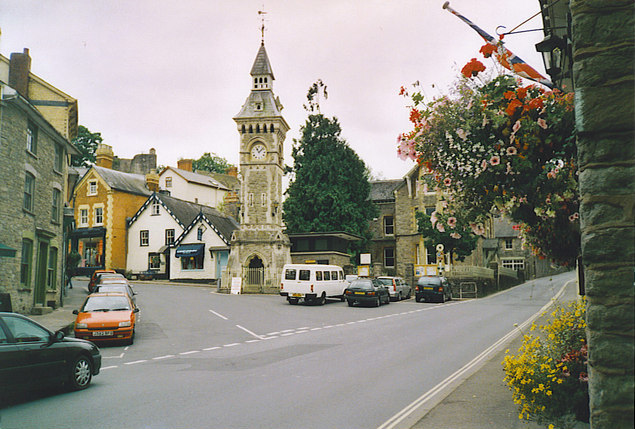
The Clock Tower, Hay-on-Wye

Oswald Martin was Armstrong's only rival solicitor in Hay. They were representing opposing parties in a property sale, the Velinewydd estate, which could have resulted in Armstrong's client losing and Armstrong having to pay a large sum to Martin's client. The details of the transaction remain unclear; Martin subsequently said there was a question about the titles. It appeared that the money entrusted to Armstrong as a deposit on the sale was gone. Martin kept mentioning the matter of completion to Armstrong, but the latter repeatedly delayed and it remained uncompleted by the time of Armstrong's trial.

Armstrong eventually invited Martin to a meeting at his home on 26 October 1921. Martin found tea laid out with cakes and buttered scones. Martin probably thought that Armstrong wanted to discuss completion of the property sale, but the two men merely discussed everyday things and office organisation although Martin could have raised the matter himself. Armstrong spoke of being lonely after the death of his wife. During the meeting over tea, Armstrong picked up a scone, said, "'scuse fingers" and handed it to Martin, who ate it. After returning home, Martin became violently ill.

Martin's father-in-law, John Davies, the chemist (pharmacist) in Hay, had made several sales of arsenic to Armstrong supposedly to kill dandelions despite the fact that it was the autumn and there were only twenty dandelions in the garden of Mayfield, the Armstrongs' home. The chemist was suspicious of Martin's sudden illness, and when Martin told him he had been to tea at Mayfield, Davies became even more so. Meanwhile, Dr Hincks was struck by how similar Martin's symptoms were to those of Katharine Armstrong. Hincks, Martin, and Davies discussed the situation, and Davies warned the Martins against receiving gifts from Armstrong.

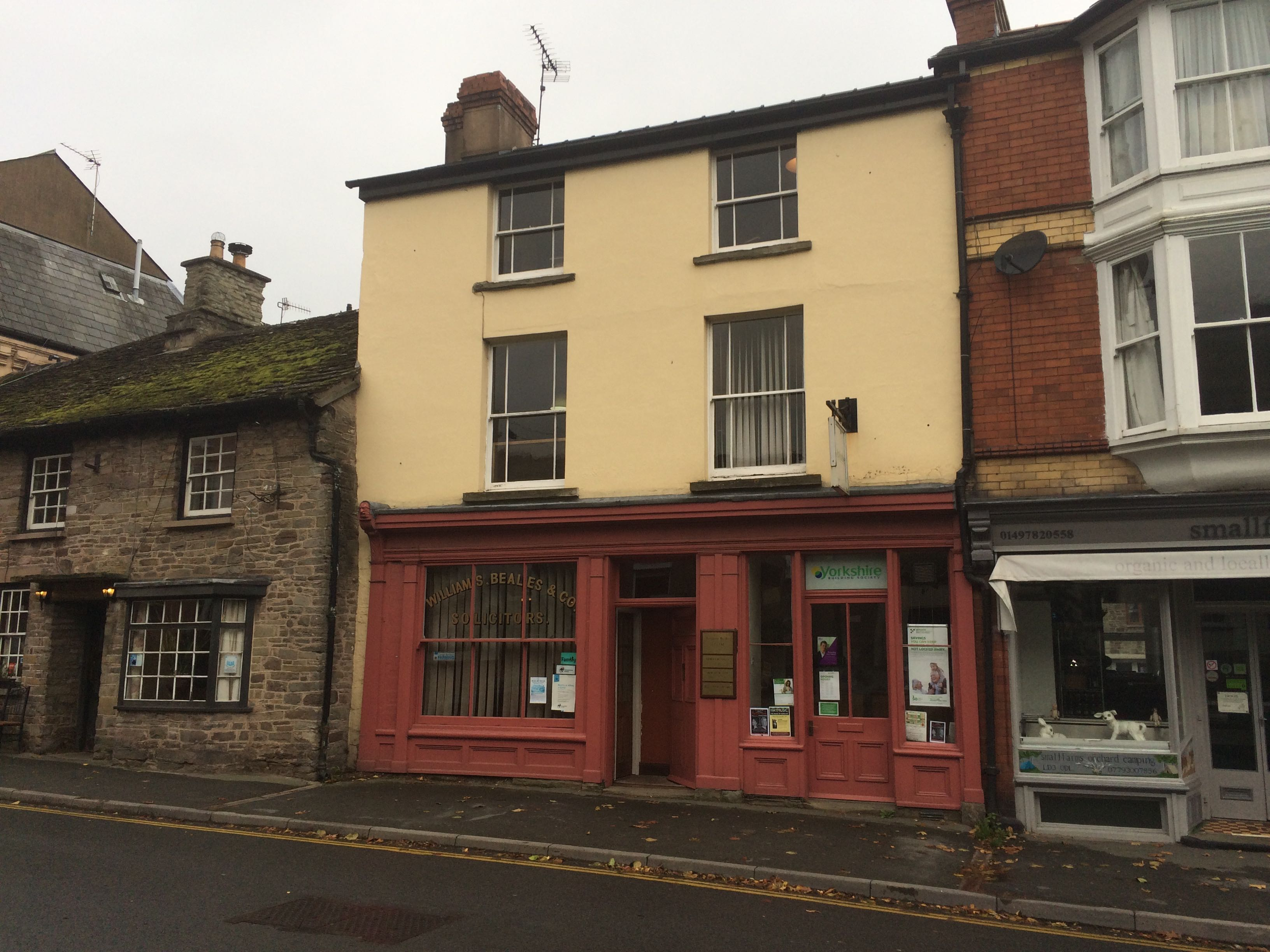
Armstrong's offices in Hay-on-Wye in 2014; he was arrested here on 31 December 1921. The building is still used by a firm of solicitors

It was subsequently discovered that a few weeks before the tea party, a box of chocolates had been anonymously sent to the Martins. Mrs Martin's sister-in-law had eaten some and become violently ill. Fortunately, some chocolates remained and when examined, some were found to have a small nozzle-like hole in the base. Dr Hincks contacted the Home Office and explained his suspicions about what had happened to Martin, later voicing suspicions about Mrs Armstrong's death. Samples of the chocolates and Martin's urine were examined and found to contain arsenic, and the Home Office now passed the case to Scotland Yard. Meanwhile, Armstrong began to bombard Martin with further invitations to tea, which Martin found it increasingly difficult to find excuses to avoid.

Scotland Yard moved slowly so as not to warn Armstrong of their suspicions. They arrested him on 31 December 1921, and he was charged with the attempted murder of Oswald Martin. He maintained he was innocent. When he was arrested, the police found a packet of arsenic in his pocket and many more in his house. Mrs Armstrong's body was exhumed and examined by the eminent Home Office pathologist Bernard Spilsbury. Her body was riddled with arsenic ten months after death, and on 19 January 1922, Armstrong was charged with the willful murder of his wife. "I repeat what I said before. I am absolutely innocent", said Armstrong.

== Trial ==
Armstrong's trial for the murder of his wife began at Hereford before Mr Justice Darling on 3 April 1922. Armstrong was defended by Sir Henry Curtis-Bennett, one of the leading criminal trial barristers of the day. Public and media interest was enormous. A year earlier there had been a trial at Carmarthen Assizes of another solicitor, Harold Greenwood, for the murder of his wife by poison, supposedly disguised as an illness. Greenwood had been acquitted. The fact that the three men who brought the charges to the police included Armstrong's business rival and father-in-law looked suspicious to some people. It was believed by some that Armstrong was being framed. However, despite the widespread belief that he would be acquitted, the prosecution case was a strong one. Katharine Armstrong's body was riddled with arsenic and the quantity at the time of her death must have been far higher; Armstrong had made huge purchases of arsenic. The defence had to make the jury believe that Mrs Armstrong had committed suicide by getting out of bed, going downstairs and helping herself to arsenic without anyone seeing or hearing her; or that massive doses of arsenic had somehow got into her system by accident. All witnesses confirmed that towards the end she was almost paralysed. Dr Bernard Spilsbury insisted that the fatal dose must have been taken within twenty-four hours of death, and Dr Hincks affirmed that for Mrs Armstrong to have taken it herself was "absolutely impossible".

== Arsenic poisoning ==
Then Armstrong had to explain his habits concerning arsenic or the white powder, arsenic trioxide. He claimed that it was his practice to put small portions of arsenic into individual pouches, which he squirted into the ground near spots where dandelions tended to grow. One small pouch was found on his person following his arrest, and there was no reasonable explanation offered for his carrying it around, particularly as the arrest was in December. Armstrong did not come off well under questioning by Mr Justice Darling concerning this point.

After the trial, two possible motives emerged for Katharine Armstrong's poisoning. First, Armstrong had decided he wanted a different, more congenial wife. Second, Katharine had written a will in 1917 leaving the bulk of her estate not to her husband, but to their children. Armstrong produced a new will following his wife's death, giving him control of her estate, but studies suggest that it was probably forged. For some time before the Velinewydd estate affair, Armstrong's business had been in financial difficulties. Difficulties in relation to the sale of the Velinewydd estate made things even worse for him.

However, the evidence against Armstrong, though considerable, was nonetheless circumstantial. No one had seen the Major administering poison, and Mrs Armstrong had occasionally spoken of suicide; some medicines contained arsenic, and there were plenty of other people coming into contact with her at Mayfield. The prosecution failed to show how it was Armstrong and only Armstrong who administered poison, and no one else. As for the Martin poisoning, other than gaining Armstrong a little time, the death of Oswald Martin would not in any way have relieved the Major's business problems.

Armstrong made no confession and adamantly maintained his total innocence to the end. On 13 April 1922 at Shirehall, Hereford, he was found guilty of the murder of his wife.

== Execution ==
Mr Justice Darling stated that he concurred with the jury's view, and that it was absurd and unsupported by any evidence that Mrs Armstrong had committed suicide. He then sentenced Armstrong to death. On 16 May 1922, the Court of Criminal Appeal dismissed his appeal, and Armstrong was hanged by John Ellis at Gloucester Prison on 31 May 1922. Ellis claimed that before the trap was opened on the gallows Armstrong called out, "Kitty I'm coomin to ye!" although this is unconfirmed. The News of the World reported that when asked by the prison governor on the morning of the execution if he had anything to say, Armstrong's last words were "I am innocent of the crime for which I have been condemned to die."

== In popular culture ==
The then-recent Armstrong case was discussed in Dorothy L. Sayers's 1927 mystery novel Unnatural Death. In addition, the murderer in Sayers's 1930 novel Strong Poison is caught with packets of arsenic, resembling Armstrong's case. In Detection Unlimited, a 1953 mystery novel written by Georgette Heyer, a character is compared to Armstrong.

The Armstrong case seems to have loosely inspired the novel Malice Aforethought (1931) by Anthony Berkeley Cox (using the pen name Francis Iles).

The Armstrong case was dramatised on the BBC radio series The Black Museum in 1952 under the title of The Champagne Glass.

Armstrong was also the subject of a 1994 TV mini-series called Dandelion Dead, which starred Michael Kitchen as Major Armstrong, Sarah Miles as Katharine Armstrong, David Thewlis as Oswald Martin and Lesley Sharp as Martin's wife, Constance. It was directed by Mike Hodges and won a BAFTA in 1995. As well as telling the main story of Armstrong's crimes, the series develops the courtship of Martin and his wife and shows the effects of events on Armstrong's children.

Deadly Advice, a black comedy released in 1994, was set in Hay-on-Wye and had Jane Horrocks becoming a serial killer under the ghostly influence of Armstrong (played by Edward Woodward) and others like Dr Crippen (Hywel Bennett) and Jack the Ripper (John Mills).

In 2019 the case was examined in Murder, Mystery and My Family. The judge who re-examined the case concluded that although the prosecution had presented a serious case against Armstrong, the trial judge had erred in law in his summing up, and that his conviction was therefore unsound.

== The Hay Poisoner ==
Armstrong's home in Cusop was subsequently owned by Martin Beales, a solicitor working in Armstrong's former office in Hay. Beales believed that Armstrong was innocent and published a book arguing his case.

== Bibliography ==
- Rose, Andrew; Lethal Witness, Sutton Publishing 2007, Kent State University Press 2009; Chapter Nine ('Excuse Fingers'). Discusses Spilsbury's major role as prosecution witness.
- Beales, Martin; Dead not Buried. 1995 (later retitled The Hay Poisoner). The author sets out the case for Armstrong's being framed. Written with the co-operation of Margaret, the Armstrongs' surviving daughter, who was incensed at the portrayal of her father in the 1994 film Dandelion Dead.
- Browne, D. and Tullett, E.V.; Bernard Spilsbury: His Life and Cases 1951.
- Jones, Frank; Beyond Suspicion: True Stories of Unexpected Killers. pp. 53–85: "A Tale of Two Lawyers": The author compares the cases against Greenwood and Armstrong. He also points out a counter theory that Armstrong may have been innocent but framed by Martin, Davies, and Hincks.
- Odell, Robin; Exhumation of a Murder: The Life and Trial of Major Armstrong. London: Harrap, 1975. ISBN 0-245-52400-2. Regarding Armstrong's guilt, the author concludes that while the evidence remains circumstantial, taken together with what is known of Armstrong's personality "all doubts are dispelled".
- Young, Filson (ed.); Trial of Herbert Rowse Armstrong, William Hodge & Co., Edinburgh 1927. Notable British Trials series.
