= Norman Thorne =

English murderer (1902–1925)

Norman Thorne (c. 1902 – 22 April 1925) was an English Sunday school teacher and chicken farmer who was convicted and hanged for what became known as the chicken run murder. Thorne murdered his fiancée Elsie Cameron (born 22 April 1898) on 5 December 1924 at his chicken farm in Crowborough, Sussex, and later dismembered and buried her body.

Sir Arthur Conan Doyle, the creator of the fictional detective Sherlock Holmes, lived in Crowborough and took an interest in the case.

== History ==
Elsie Cameron, of Kensal Rise, London, and Norman Thorne were engaged on Christmas Day 1922. It became apparent that Cameron had psychological problems and Thorne, who had started seeing another woman, no longer wanted to marry her, although he did not have the courage to tell her. Cameron and her family, who wanted her off their hands, pressured Thorne to set a wedding date. To try to speed up the wedding, Cameron claimed she was pregnant, although she and Thorne had never had sex.

On Friday 5 December 1924, Cameron travelled from London to Crowborough, Sussex, to stay with Thorne for a planned visit. He later claimed he had not seen her. He sent a note to her on 7 December asking why she had not come. The police began an investigation, and witnesses reported they had seen Cameron in Crowborough and on Thorne's farm on 5 December. After further investigations, the police arrested Thorne on 14 January 1925. The farm was searched and the police dug in the grounds. Items belonging to Cameron, including an overnight bag, were found.

On 15 January Thorne gave a statement to the police admitting that he had dismembered the body, and he told them where it was buried. He claimed that Cameron had committed suicide by hanging herself from a beam in the hut where he lived. An examination of the beam showed no marks consistent with his story. The police found newspaper cuttings in Thorne's hut about a murder that had occurred on 15 April 1924 on a Sussex beach; one of the so-called Crumbles murders, in which the body had also been dismembered and buried. This finding was alleged to indicate pre-meditation on the part of Thorne.

Thorne was tried at the Assizes (a court) in Lewes on 11 March 1925 before Mr Justice Finlay. The prosecution was led by Sir Henry Curtis Bennett and the defence by J.D. Cassels. The defence claimed that Cameron had hanged herself and that Thorne had concealed the death in panic. Home Office pathologist Sir Bernard Spilsbury testified that she had been beaten to death. Thorne was found guilty of murder on 16 March 1925.

The case received considerable press coverage. Many people, including Sir Arthur Conan Doyle, thought that the trial had not proved 'beyond reasonable doubt' that Thorne had killed, or meant to kill, Cameron. An appeal was lodged in March 1925, but it was dismissed the following month. Thorne was hanged on 22 April 1925 in Wandsworth prison in London on what would have been Cameron's 27th birthday.

A BBC investigative programme, Murder, Mystery and My Family, series 3, episode 3, broadcast in 2019, re-examined the evidence with two barristers and a judge. The judge declared his belief that the conviction was safe, and that Thorne did indeed murder Cameron.

== See also ==
- Capital punishment in the United Kingdom

== Bibliography ==
- Normanton, Helena (ed.) (1929), The Trial of Norman Thorne: the Crowborough chicken farm murder. Great Britain (Sussex): Geoffrey Bles
- Wensley, Frederick Porter (2005), Forty Years of Scotland Yard: A Record of Lifetime's Service in the Criminal Investigation Department (pp. 288–291). Whitefish, Montana: Kessinger Publishing. ISBN 1-4179-8997-1
- Rose, Andrew (2009), A Martyr to Spilsburyism in Lethal Witness. Ohio: Kent State University Press
- Walters, Minette (2006) Chickenfeed. 3rd ed. London, England: Pan Books. ISBN 978-0330440318
- Worsley KC, Paul (2023) Trial of Norman Thorne, Notable British Trials series. London: Mango Books.
