= Niort-de-Sault =

Commune in Occitanie, France

- Commune
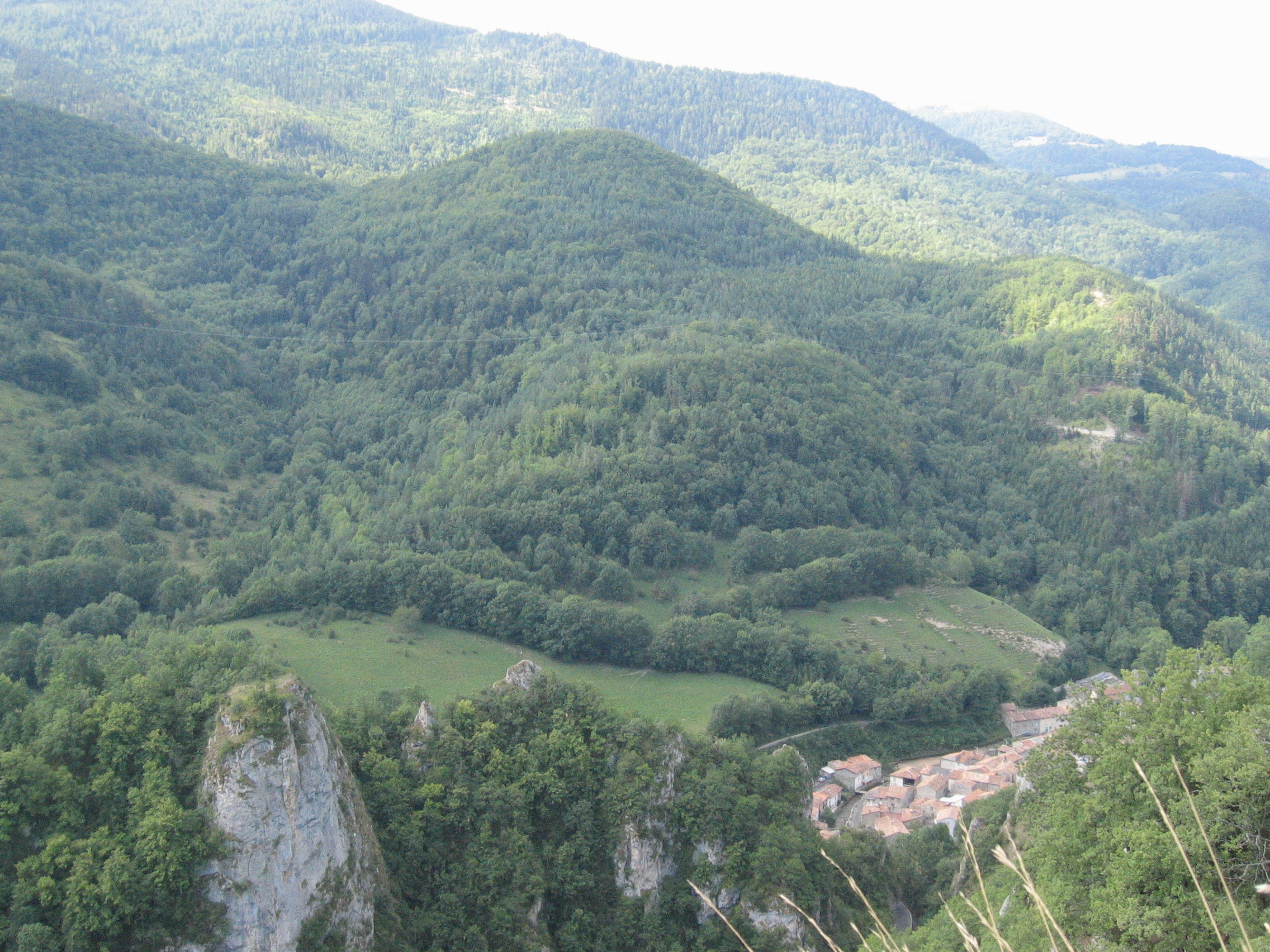
- Town seen from the chateau

- Coat of arms
- Location of Niort-de-Sault
- Location within France Location within Occitanie
- Coordinates: 42°48′12″N 2°00′14″E
- Country: France
- Region: Occitania
- Department: Aude
- Arrondissement: Limoux
- Canton: La Haute-Vallée de l'Aude

Government
  - Mayor (2020–2026): Marie-Antoinette Moulis
- Area^{1}: 22.11 km^{2} (8.54 sq mi)
- Elevation: 831 m (2,726 ft)
- Highest elevation: 1,974 m (6,476 ft)
- Lowest elevation: 771 m (2,530 ft)
- Population (2023): 34
  - Density: 1.5/km^{2} (4.0/sq mi)
- Time zone: UTC+01:00 (CET)
  - Summer (DST): UTC+02:00 (CEST)
- INSEE/Postal code: 11265 /11140
- ^{1} French Land Register data, which excludes lakes, ponds, glaciers > 1 km^{2} (0.386 sq mi or 247 acres) and river estuaries.

Niort-de-Sault (French pronunciation: [njɔʁ də so]; Occitan: Niòrt de Saut) is a commune in the Aude department, Occitania, France.

== Population ==
Historical population
| Year | Pop. | ±% p.a. |
|---|---|---|
| 1968 | 111 | — |
| 1975 | 68 | −6.76% |
| 1982 | 60 | −1.77% |
| 1990 | 53 | −1.54% |
| 1999 | 35 | −4.51% |
| 2007 | 33 | −0.73% |
| 2012 | 20 | −9.53% |
| 2017 | 32 | +9.86% |
| 2023 | 34 | +1.02% |
Source: INSEE

== Notable people ==
- Jean-Pierre Vaquier, murderer

== See also ==
- Communes of the Aude department
