= Donald Merrett =

British criminal (1908–1954)

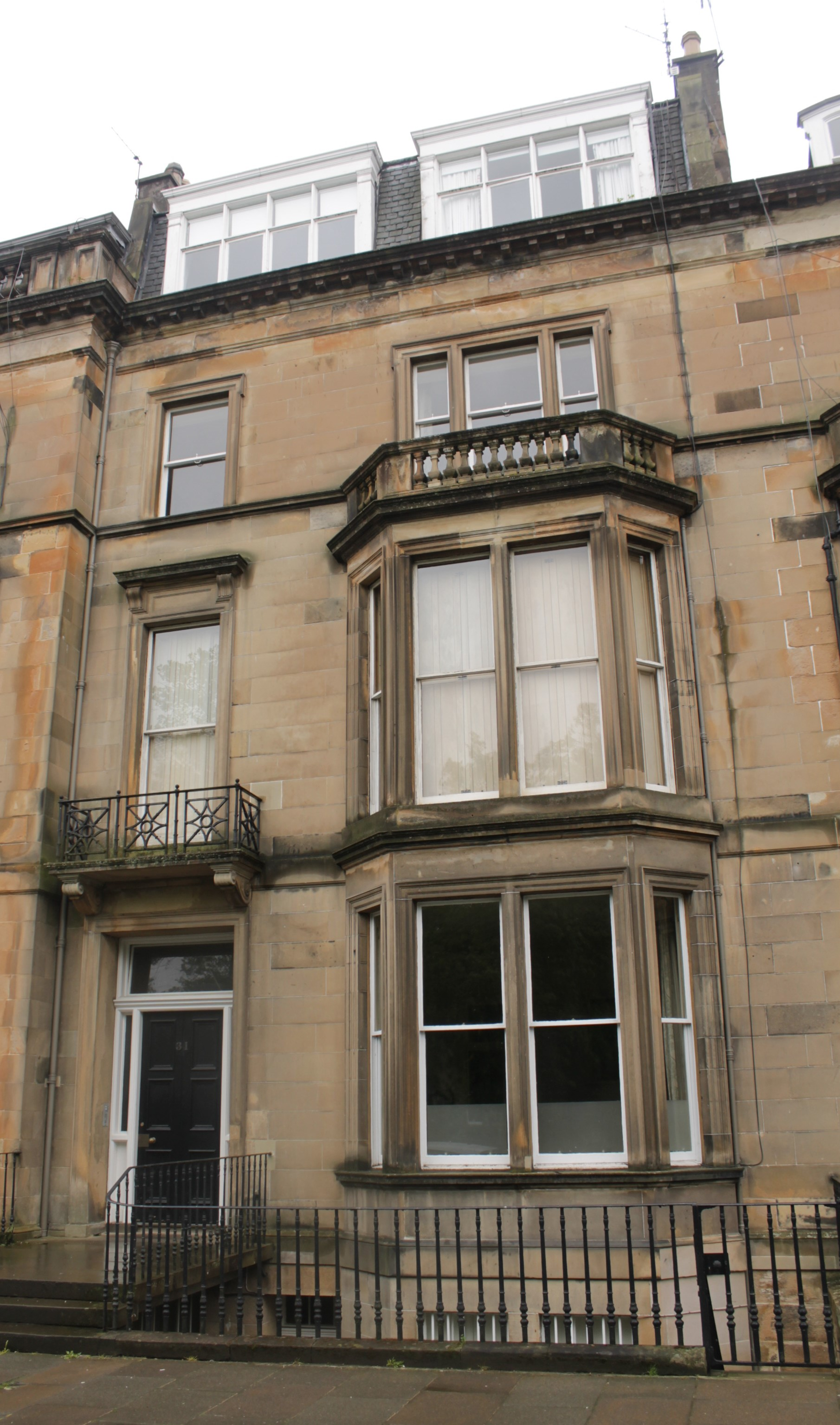
31 Buckingham Terrace, Edinburgh

John Donald Merrett (17 August 1908 – 16 February 1954) was a British murderer and convicted fraudster also known under the name of Ronald John Chesney in later life. He left a wide trail of damage but escaped with minimal punishment. Though he was immensely rich his crimes were mainly driven by greed. In his second guise he was also known as the Amazing Mr Chesney. A highly flamboyant character, he was known by his later friends and lovers as "Ches".

== Early life ==
Merrett was born in 1908 in Levin in the North Island of New Zealand. His parents were John Alfred Merrett, a consulting engineer, and his wife Bertha née Milner. Donald was an only child. The family moved to St Petersburg in Russia where the father worked installing an electricity supply in the city, but the cold climate did not suit Bertha. Linked to a growing estrangement with Donald's father Bertha and Donald moved to Switzerland around 1913 and Merrett never saw his father again. Bertha remained in the safety of Switzerland (a neutral country) for the duration of the First World War. Bertha cared for wounded British soldiers released from prisoner of war camps. She told enquirers that her husband was killed in the Russian Revolution.

From 1920 to 1923 Merrett lived with his mother in Oamaru, New Zealand and attended Waitaki Boys' High School, as recalled by a former master at the school who tutored him.

In 1924 Bertha returned to England and rented a cottage near Reading. Donald was then educated privately at Malvern College as a boarder. He had a reputation as being clever but badly behaved. He was expelled for being found in bed with a girl.

In 1925 they moved to rental accommodation in Edinburgh. Merrett began studying for a BA degree at Edinburgh University. There is no evidence that he ever attended any lectures. He and his wife lived together in a large Victorian townhouse purchased by Bertha at 31 Buckingham Terrace in the fashionable and expensive Learmonth district. The aim was that Merrett would eventually join the Diplomatic Service.

== Mother's death ==
Merrett began an affair with Elizabeth (Betty) Christie, who was paid for dances at the Dunedin Palais de Dance at 10 Picardy Place at the top of Leith Walk. In February 1926 he began forging cheques in his mother's name to fund his lifestyle. His mother had an income of £700 per year but by mid-March he had forged cheques to the value of £450. The bank informed Bertha that her account was in debit. She was puzzled and queried how Donald had afforded his new motorcycle. She had also queried his need for a Spanish automatic pistol.

At 9.30am on 17 March 1926 an argument was precipitated by a second letter from the bank. Bertha was shot in the head. She was in the main first floor living room, where she had a writing bureau. Donald told their maid that his mother had shot herself due to her worries over debts. The police were called and constables Middlemass and Izatt attended along with an ambulance. Bertha was not dead, however but, as a suspected suicide, was placed in "the custody ward". This was a controlled area in Edinburgh Royal Infirmary on Lauriston Place. Merrett went out dancing with Betty that night. Bertha regained consciousness but was never interviewed by the police as the matter was treated as an attempted suicide. She told nurses that she remembered arguing with Donald and an explosion. A visitor implied to her that Donald had shot her and she said "Was it Donald? That naughty boy, did he do this?" She died on 1 April 1926 two weeks after being shot.

After Bertha's death Donald persuaded other relatives that he wanted to go to London. Only when the Clydesdale Bank informed police that Merrett was still receiving cheques from Bertha after her death did the police investigate. He was arrested in December 1926 on charges of murdering his mother and forging cheques to the value of £457.

His trial began at the High Court in Parliament Square in central Edinburgh on 1 February 1927. It was a very high-profile case and involved many prominent legal figures of the day. Lord Alness sat in judgement. The prosecution was led by Lord Advocate Wiliam Watson. The defence was led by Craigie Aitchison. The coroner's evidence was presented by Henry Littlejohn and John Glaister. The most crucial evidence on behalf of the defence was given by Bernard Spilsbury who explained how a lack of powder burns on the head did not rule out suicide. The London gunsmith Robert Churchill was also called to testify that suicide was possible. Donald himself did not speak.

The inactivity on the part of the police was said to stem from not believing that a 17 year old could commit such a crime and their preference for the suicide theory. The evidence of the maid (Rita Sutherland) was inconsistent and also somewhat supported the suicide theory.

Police conduct of the investigation was heavily criticised by Lord Alness. The gun had not been fingerprinted, the bank letters had been destroyed and no copies had been requested. Although there was a wealth of circumstantial evidence, the jury of 15 voted in a ratio of 5 as guilty and 10 as not proven (a specific judgement in Scottish law). Donald was found not guilty of the murder charge but guilty of fraud in relation to the cheques. He served 12 months at Saughtonhall Prison in west Edinburgh.

== Criminal Career ==
Merrett was released in 1928 and moved to Bexhill-on-Sea to live with a friend of his mother, Mary Bonar, whom he called Aunt Mary although she was not a blood relative. There he fell in love with Bonar's daughter, Isobel Veronica ("Vera") Bonnar. They eloped in March 1928 and were married in Glasgow where marriage was easier than in England. They went to live in Newcastle-upon-Tyne. They were charged with obtaining goods to the value of £200 using fraudulent cheques in the name of McCormack. Merrett gave his name as Chesney and served 9 months in prison for this crime.

On his 21st birthday he inherited £50,000 from his grandfather, the money having been held in trust until that time. He gave Vera £8400 from this sum. He adopted the new name "Ronald Chesney" to distance himself from his criminal past. The couple moved to the Portsmouth area and bought a large country house. They adopted two children: a 2 year old and 5 year old.

Merrett bought a yacht, the Armentares, and grew a beard. Very unusually for the time he wore a gold ring in his ear, adopting the look of a pirate. He bought a further yacht, the Gypsy May and learned to fly at Brooklands. His stated career was given as a stockbroker but he spent most of his time smuggling cigarettes. He purchased Colleton Hall in Devon.

Meanwhile, Vera's mother married Thomas Chalmers Menzies, a Scot who styled himself "Baron Menzies" but had no realistic claim to any such title. This relationship did not last long but Mary loved to call herself "Lady Menzies" and continued to do so.

"Lady Menzies" joined Merrett and Vera during a period living in Malta when Merrett (now calling himself Ronald Chesney) began gun-running boat trips from North Africa to Spain in the build up to the Spanish Civil War. He also smuggled cigarettes and liquor into Italy. In 1938 he converted the Armentares into a floating casino.

In the Second World War he left the heavily bombed Malta and returned to London. There he joined the Royal Navy Volunteer Reserve, and served on Motor Gun Boat 92 in the Mediterranean, but this seems largely to have been to facilitate a smuggling exercise he was undertaking. Nevertheless, he reached the rank of Lt. Commander. He was captured in June 1942 at the Fall of Tobruk and spent some time as a prisoner of war in Bengazi before being released as part of a prisoner exchange in 1943. (He liked to say he escaped). Vera went to Ealing where she ran an old people's home at 22 Montpelier Road. After the war ended, Merrett stayed in Germany based at Wilhelmshaven where he became involved in the black market and racketeering. He was dishonourably discharged from the Royal Naval Reserve in 1946 following the discovery of his various criminal activities. In 1945 he began an affair with a German woman, 22 year old Gerda Schaller whom he had "rescued" from the Soviet sector.

== Double murder and suicide ==
Merrett was discharged from the RNVR in 1946 for stealing property. He served 4 months in Hamburg in a military prison.

On his release he sought a divorce from Vera in order to marry Gerda but Vera was a Catholic and refused. Under the name of Ronald Chesney, Merrett was jailed for a further four months in 1946 for larceny. He was jailed in Paris in 1947 for smuggling, then again in Paris in 1948 for currency trafficking and then in Bern in Switzerland for dealing in forged currency. In 1949 he was fined 30,000 francs for offences against aliens. Gerda also spent time in prison for her part in his crimes.

In 1952 he served time in Wandsworth Prison in England for currency smuggling and offered his soon-to-be-released cellmate £1000 to kill Vera. On release he went to Cologne where he met 26 year old Sonia Winnekes in a night club having effectively abandoned Gerda.

In June 1953, Merrett obtained a passport in the name of Leslie Chown. Chown was a real person whom Merrett had encountered in a pub and to whom he bore some similarity. He travelled to England to see Vera using this false passport at the beginning of February. He stayed briefly ensuring he would be remembered by a policewoman during his exit from England, He spent four days in a hotel in Amsterdam under the name of Mr and Mrs Milner (his mother's maiden name). He flew back to London on 10 February. He went to find Vera in West Ealing intending to get back the £8000 he had given her. He reached her on 11 February 1954. He got her drunk and drowned her in the bathtub. His mother-in-law confronted him as he left and he struck her with a metal coffee pot, then strangled her to death. The event was labelled the Ealing Double Murder.

He immediately went on the run and returned to Continental Europe. After a flight to Amsterdam he took a train to Germany. He spent a final two nights with Sonia in her home town of Düren at 51 Josefstrasse and told her he was going back to England.

He was found dead on 16 February 1954 in a wood near Cologne with a self-inflicted gunshot wound to the head from a Colt 45. He left a letter to Sonia Winnikes, then aged 28. Only Gerda attended his funeral in Germany on 23 February 1954. She paid for the burial but Sonia received all his worldly goods. He is buried in an area reserved for suicides in the churchyard at Düren.

The German police removed his forearms and sent them to London for confirmation that it was Merrett. They are preserved in the liquid in which they were delivered in the Crime Museum (formerly known as the Black Museum) at Scotland Yard.

== Aftermath ==
Vera and her mother were buried together on 5 March 1954 in Hastings Borough Cemetery.

His adopted daughter Ann Trull survived all the events.

John Merrett senior had not died in the Russian Revolution as Bertha claimed but had returned to England. He followed the trial and double murder scandal with dismay. He died in 1966.

The Dunedin Palais de Dance was converted to garage use and is owned by Hertz Car Rental.
