= Winifred Duke =

British author (1890–1962)

- Born: 22 March 1890; Liverpool, Lancashire, England
- Died: 4 April 1962 (aged 72)
- Occupation: Writer (novelist)
- Writing career
- Period: 20th century
- Genres: History, fiction

Winifred Amy Duke (22 March 1890 - 4 April 1962) was a British author of fiction and Scottish history.

== Biography ==
Winifred Duke was born in Liverpool, Lancashire, England on 22 March 1890. Her father was Edward St Arnaud Duke who was a clergyman in the Anglican church and Louisa Duke. She was the younger of two daughters. She attended The Belvedere Academy, a private girls school in Liverpool. She lived in Edinburgh and later in Colinton, Midlothian, Scotland. She worked as an editor, notably for a series on English criminal law called Notable British Trials.

She had an interest in criminology which led her to write several books on famous trials. Some of her books on crime included Trial of Harold Greenwood (1930), Trial of Field and Gray (1939), and Trial of Frederick Nodder (1950). She also wrote articles for The Juridical Review, a monthly Scottish legal journal.

Duke also wrote books on Scottish history. Some of her books include Lord George Murray and the ’45 (1927), Prince Charles Edward and the ’45 (1938), and In the Steps of Bonnie Prince Charlie (1953). Duke was acknowledged as an incisive historian in a review of her book Lord George Murray and the ’45, in which she portrays Murray as one of the few competent leaders to emerge from the last Jacobite rebellion.

She died in Edinburgh, Scotland in 1962.

== Works ==
- The House Of Ogilvy, (1922)
- The Wild Flame, (1923)
- The Laird, (1925)
- Scotland's Heir, (1925)
- Lord George Murray And The '45, (1927)
- Tales Of Hate, (1927)
- Madeleine Smith: A Tragi-Comedy, (1928)
- King Of The Highland Hearts, (1929)
- Continuing City, (1929)
- Trial Of Harold Greenwood, (1930)
- The Drove Road, (1930)
- Bastard Verdict, (1931)
- The Dark Hill, (1932)
- The Sown Wind, (1932)
- Finale, (1933)
- These Are They, (1933)
- Six Trials, (1934)
- Magpie's Hoard, (1934)
- The Hour Glass, (1934)
- Stubble, (1935)
- Skin For Skin, (1935)
- Crookedshaws, (1936)
- Long Furrows, (1936)
- The Stroke Of Murder, (1937)
- Room For A Ghost, (1937)
- Murder Of Mr Mallabee, (1937)
- Death And His Sweetheart, (1938)
- Prince Charles Edward And The '45, (1938)
- Out Of The North, (1939)
- Trial Of Field And Gray, (1939)
- Household Gods, (1939)
- Counterfeit, (1940)
- Unjust Jury, (1941)
- The Shears Of Destiny, (1942)
- Royal Ishmael, (1943)
- We Owe God A Death, (1944)
- Funeral March Of A Marionette, (1945)
- The Spider's Web, (1945)
- Blind Geese, (1946)
- Seven Women, (1947)
- The Black Mirror, (1948)
- Mart Of Nations, (1949)
- Dirge For A Dead Witch, (1949)
- The Needful Journey, (1950)
- Trial Of Frederick Nodder, (1950)
- Shadows, (1951)
- Winter Pride, (1952)
- The Rash Adventurer, (1952)
- A Web In Childhood, (1953)
- Lost Cause, (1953)
- In The Steps Of Bonnie Prince Charlie, (1953)
- The Cherry-Fair, (1954)
- Second Spring, (1955)
- My Grim Chamberlain, (1955)
- The Ship Of Fools, (1956)
- The Dancing Of The Fox, (1956)

Church of England Baptisms, Edge Hill, St.Dunstan's, Liverpool
