= Podmore case =

1930 English murder case

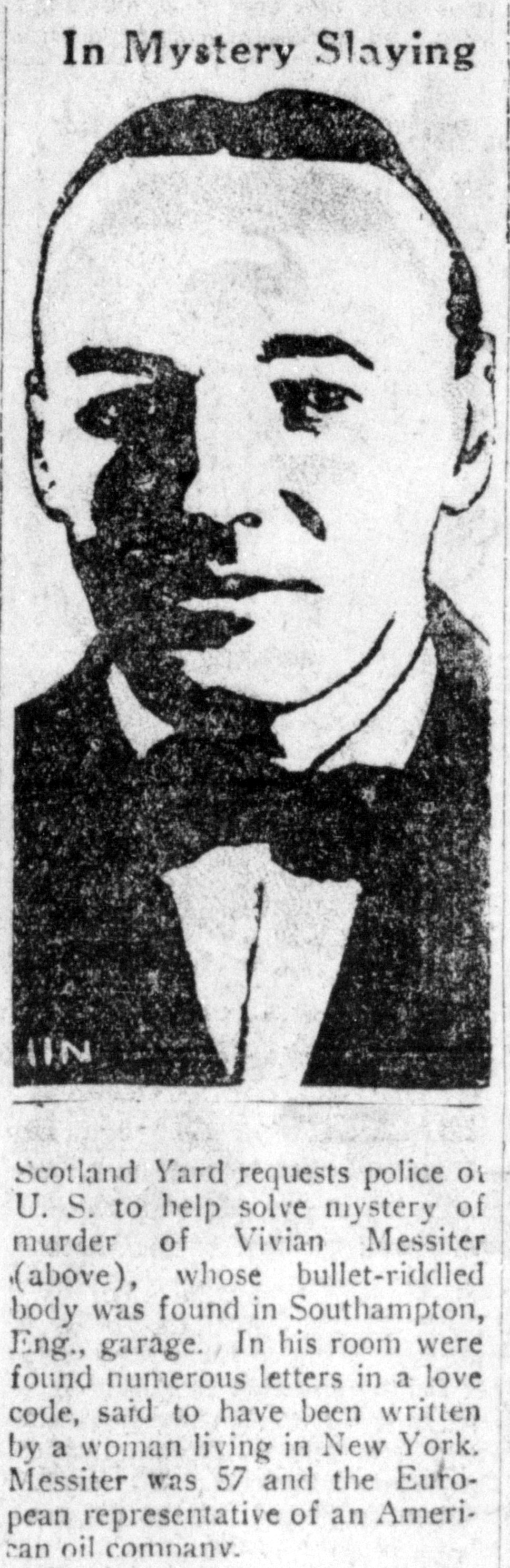
Newspaper column about the murder of Vivian Messiter, with drawing of the victim (alive)

The Podmore Case was a controversial landmark English criminal case. It involved a murder conviction based on a painstaking police investigation, and from careful evaluation of the forensic evidence.

== The crime ==
On 10 January 1929, two men found the decomposing, rat-bitten body of a man behind some boxes in a locked garage in Southampton; the garage was used as a storeroom by the local agent of the Wolf's Head Oil Company, and the body was identified as that of the agent Vivian Messiter, who had been missing for some time.

The victim was reported as missing for nine weeks prior to the discovery of his body, and while police had checked the garage, they did not pursue the matter thoroughly since they found it locked. It was only when a new oil company agent came to take over the garage when it was opened and the body discovered.

Preliminary examination of the body revealed a puncture over the left eye, which led police to think that Messiter had been shot, but further examination by Sir Bernard Spilsbury indicated that the real cause of death was multiple severe blunt force trauma to the skull, so much so that "it was fractured everywhere except on top". The examination of the crime scene further revealed the presence of extensive blood splatter to the height of several feet, which meant that the man had been murdered in the same location.

A bloodstained hammer was found near the scene, and upon examination of it, Spilsbury found a hair consistent with that of the eyebrow hair of the dead man. Since the wounds on the victim were also consistent with the hammer, it was Spilbury's conclusion that the hammer, wielded with great force, was the murder weapon.

== The hunt ==
Among the papers that were found was a reply to an advertisement for local agents, signed "William F. Thomas", which the killer had attempted to obscure by pouring oil over it and stamping it repeatedly into the earth. In pursuing this lead the police were able to discover that a man of that name had worked for a Wiltshire building contractor and had disappeared after allegedly absconding with a large number of wage packets.

Detectives assigned to the case next went to the lodgings where "Mr. Thomas" had stayed before his disappearance. Apparently his departure was so hurried that he negligently left many clues behind. From these the police were able to determine that "William Thomas" was an alias for one William Henry Podmore, who was known to the police, as he was wanted for fraud in Manchester. Suspicion immediately fell on him, and he was subsequently arrested and brought in for questioning.

It was determined that Podmore did indeed work as Messiter's assistant, but as the police still did not have enough evidence for him to be charged with murder, he was convicted of fraud and sentenced to six months in prison.

In the meantime, a breakthrough in the case came with the careful examination of a receipt book for oil sale commissions. Based on a study of indentations between the lines of a genuine receipt made by pencilled writing on the sheet above—which had been torn out—it was determined that Podmore had been reporting to Messiter sales of oil to non-existent customers, and collecting commissions on these sales. Police theorized that upon learning of this, Messiter had confronted Podmore about the swindle, whereupon Podmore, being aware of the Manchester charge, had lost his nerve and murdered him with the hammer.

== Resolution ==
While in prison on the fraud charge, Podmore confessed that he had stolen money from Messiter. This was reported to the authorities and he was arrested immediately on his release from Winchester prison and sentenced to a further six months. During this second term of imprisonment he again spoke to fellow prisoners about the murder. Consequently, fourteen months after the murder, the police were certain that they now had enough evidence to charge Podmore with murder. His trial began in March 1930 at Winchester Assizes. Because it was obvious that Messiter had still been repeatedly battered with the hammer even when unconscious, public opinion was overwhelmingly against Podmore. While the hair evidence was played up by the media, it was only part of a painstaking police investigation although it unquestionably identified the murder weapon. Of greater importance was the receipt book, as well as the testimony of two fellow prisoners of Podmore who stated that he had confessed in their presence.

== The end ==
William Henry Podmore was found guilty of the murder of Messiter, and hanged on 22 April 1930 despite some public outcry against the verdict. This appears to have been based largely on public mistrust of the prison witnesses to whom Podmore had allegedly confessed, as the public could not believe that Podmore would have confessed a capital crime to multiple complete strangers in circumstances where he would almost certainly be found out.
