= Dandelion Dead =

1994 British drama miniseries

- Written by: Michael Chaplin
- Directed by: Mike Hodges
- Starring: Michael Kitchen; Sarah Miles; David Thewlis; Lesley Sharp; Peter Vaughan; Diana Quick
- Opening theme: Barrington Pheloung
- Country of origin: United Kingdom
- Original language: English
- No. of series: 1
- No. of episodes: 2

Production
- Executive producer: Sarah Wilson
- Producers: Patrick Harbinson; Mayank Velhankar
- Cinematography: Gerry Fisher
- Editor: Malcolm Cooke
- Running time: 203 minutes (including commercials)
- Production company: LWT

Original release
- Network: ITV
- Release: 6 February – 13 February 1994

Dandelion Dead is a British TV mini-series produced by LWT for ITV that aired in two parts on 6 and 13 February 1994. It is based on the true story of Herbert Rowse Armstrong, a solicitor in the provincial town of Hay-on-Wye, Wales, who was convicted and hanged in May 1922 for the murder of his wife and the attempted murder of a fellow solicitor and business rival, Oswald Martin.

The series starred Michael Kitchen as Major Armstrong, Sarah Miles as Catherine Armstrong, David Thewlis as Oswald Martin and Lesley Sharp as Constance, Martin's wife. It was directed by Mike Hodges and won a BAFTA in 1995. As well as telling the main story of Major Armstrong's crimes, the series develops the courtship of Martin and his wife and shows the effects of events on Armstrong's children.

== Cast ==
- Michael Kitchen as Major Herbert Rowse Armstrong
- Sarah Miles as Catherine Armstrong
- David Thewlis as Oswald Martin
- Lesley Sharp as Constance 'Connie' Martin, née Davies
- Peter Vaughan as Doctor Hinks
- Diana Quick as Marion Glassford-Gale
- Bernard Hepton as Mr. Davies
- Don Henderson as Chief Inspector Crutchett
- Robert Stephens as Henry Vaughan
- Nicholas Selby as Sir Bernard Spilsbury
- Roger Lloyd-Pack as Phillips

== Reception ==
Ray Loynd, writing for the Los Angeles Times, called the series "full of rich atmosphere, ripe characters and black humor". He noted that "The movie’s real accomplishment is in catching the fabric of a whole town, almost in the manner of a Victorian novel."
