= Crumbles murders =

Either of two 1920s murder cases in England

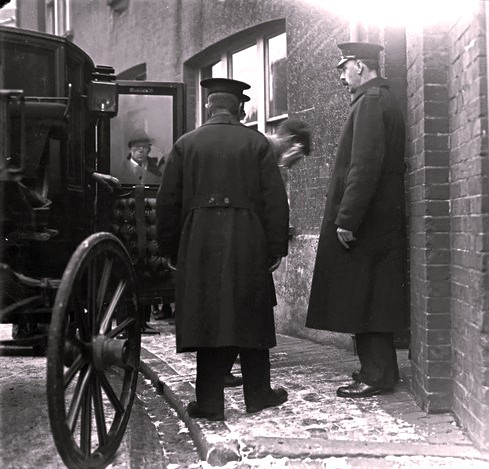
- One of the perpetrators of the first of the Crumbles murders, William Gray, arrives at Lewes Assizes, December 1920
- Location: 50.79983°N 0.33955°E; East Sussex, England
- Date: 17 August 1920 (Munro); 15 April 1924 (Kaye)
- Perpetrators: Jack Field and William Gray (Munro); Patrick Mahon (Kaye)
- Motive: Robbery (Munro); Elimination (Kaye)
- Sentence: Field and Gray; Death (17 December 1920); Mahon; Death (19 July 1924)

The Crumbles Murders are two separate and unrelated crimes which occurred on a shingle beach located between Eastbourne and Pevensey Bay, England—locally referred to as "the Crumbles"—in the 1920s. The first of these two murders is the 1920 bludgeoning murder of 17-year-old Irene Munro, committed by two men: Jack Field and William Gray. The second murder to occur upon the Crumbles is the 1924 murder of 38-year-old Emily Kaye, who was murdered by her lover, Patrick Mahon.

The three perpetrators of the two "Crumbles Murders" were all tried at Lewes Assizes before Mr Justice Avory. All three were executed by hanging at Wandsworth Prison. The executioner of all three men was Thomas Pierrepoint.

== Murder of Irene Munro ==
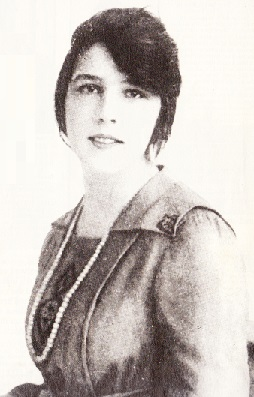
Irene Munro, murdered by Jack Field and William Gray on 19 August 1920

=== Background ===
Irene Violet Munro was a 17-year-old typist, employed by a firm of chartered accountants based in Oxford Street, London. In August 1920, Munro informed her mother, Flora, of her intentions to holiday alone in the seaside resort of Eastbourne rather than visit relatives in Portobello, Edinburgh, as she and her widowed mother had traditionally done for many years. (Note: Munro was born in Brighton on 23 November 1902. She had lived in Scotland until 1909. She and her mother had then relocated to London following the death of her father.) Her mother agreed to these plans and assisted in the arrangements for her only daughter to spend two weeks at Seaside, Eastbourne, before returning to the family home in South Kensington. She herself travelled by sea to visit her family in Scotland on 14 August, embarking from Wapping Pier.

On 16 August, Munro travelled to the South Coast. She soon found lodgings at 393 Seaside and is known to have written a letter to her mother that evening, informing her of her safe arrival in Eastbourne and of her intentions to purchase gifts for family members.

By prearrangement, Munro paid her landlady, a Mrs Ada Wynniatt, the weekly cost for her room (30 shillings) in advance, and Mrs Wynniatt later stated she quickly "warmed" to the young Londoner who still had a slight Scottish accent.

==== Holiday ====
Shortly after her arrival, Munro is known to have penned a second letter to her mother as she relaxed upon Eastbourne beach, again informing her of her safe arrival and detailing her having visited local landmarks such as Beachy Head the previous day (17 August). She closed this letter by writing: "Goodbye for the present. Please give my love to Granny, Auntie, Jessie, and everyone. Your affectionate, Rene. XXXX."

Although Mrs Wynniatt stated Munro had been "fairly cheerful" during the initial days of her holiday, she later testified that, by 18 August, the girl had become somewhat melancholy, stating to her: "My mother wanted me to go to Scotland with her. I should have gone. I wish I had gone now."

=== Encounter with Field and Gray ===
Three days after her arrival in Eastbourne, on 19 August, Munro encountered two local men: Jack Alfred Field (aged 19) and William Thomas Gray (aged 29). The two struck the pretence of a friendship with her, offering to show Munro some local landmarks before the trio had a drink in a local pub. Munro then returned to her hotel for lunch, having agreed to meet the two men at a bus stop located opposite the Archery Taven, close to the village of Pevensey, that afternoon. Before leaving her hotel shortly before 3:00 p.m., Munro informed her landlady of her intentions to travel to Hampden Park. (Note: Hampden Park was located less than two miles from Munro's lodgings at 393 Seaside.)

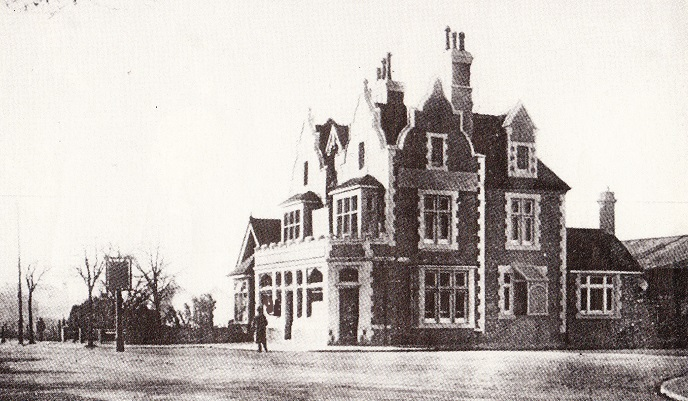
The Archery Tavern, seen here in August 1920. Munro and her murderers were seen at this location on the afternoon of her murder.

According to subsequent eyewitness accounts, Munro was already waiting at the bus stop when both men alighted from the platform of a bus to meet her. One of the last individuals to see Munro alive observed her talking amicably with the two as they walked in the direction of the Crumbles. According to this eyewitness, the younger of the two men was walking arm in arm with Munro at approximately 4:00 p.m.

=== Murder ===
Once the three had reached a secluded section of the Crumbles, approximately 300 yards from the closest inhabited property and within sight of Pevensey Castle, Munro exclaimed she was tired, before reaching into her silk handbag for a handkerchief, which she used to dab her face. As she did so, the two men looked at each other, and Gray nodded to his companion. Field then raised the walking stick in his possession and poised the weapon at shoulder height as Gray attempted to snatch Munro's handbag. Although startled, the girl maintained her grip on her handbag, shouting, "Hey, what do you think—?" In response, Field struck Munro across her mouth with the metal ferrule of his walking stick, dislodging two of her teeth, loosening two others and causing her to fall backwards and scream in pain as Gray shouted, "Shut up!" Field then exclaimed to his companion, "For God's sake, do something!"

In response to both Munro's screams and Field's panicked exclamation, Gray grabbed a section of ironstone brick weighing 32 lbs located close to where she had fallen. She was then extensively bludgeoned about the face and head with this section of brick by Gray, sustaining several fractures and causing her to die of shock. Although most likely rendered deeply unconscious, Munro may have lived for up to thirty minutes before succumbing to her injuries. Gray then concealed the girl's handbag beneath his coat before removing a 9ct. gold ring from one of her fingers. (Note: Field would later claim to have stood "mesmerised" as he observed Gray repeatedly bludgeoning Munro with this section of ironstone brick before being "shaken awake" by Gray.) Both men then hastily buried her body on the beach in a makeshift grave measuring 4 feet (1.2 m) in depth, first covering her body with her coat and placing her hat over her face. One of her feet remained exposed above ground. (Note: Three days later, a holiday-maker discovered Munro's keys not far from the scene of her murder. These keys had evidently been discarded from her handbag after her murder. Her handbag was never recovered.)

Within hours of the murder, both men are known to have visited the Albemarle Hotel, where they insisted on the two barmaids sharing a drink of their choice with them, also purchasing drinks for several local women with the money from Munro's purse. Later that afternoon, the two men visited the Eastbourne Hippodrome, where Field paid two local men sums of money he had borrowed from them several weeks earlier.

==== Discovery ====
At 3:30 p.m. the following afternoon, Irene Munro's body was discovered by a 13-year-old boy named William Weller, who almost tripped upon her exposed foot while running across the beach. Her body was buried upon a bank alongside a light railway typically used for the transport of gravel. The grave itself was some 700 yards from the sea.

Police were summoned, with officers from both Hailsham and Eastbourne arriving at the scene. A large bloodstained stone was found two yards from her body, and two rusty shovels were also recovered at the crime scene. Her body lay on her left side, with her right leg and left arm extended, her left leg bent beneath her right, and her right arm folded across her chest. The makeshift grave was markedly shallow, with the shingle covering her body measuring between three and six inches in depth. The area of the Crumbles where Munro's body was discovered was promptly cordoned off, and an experienced investigator from Scotland Yard named George Mercer was dispatched to Eastbourne to supervise the investigation on 21 August.

Upon conclusion of a forensic examination of the crime scene late on the evening of 20 August, Munro's body was removed to the mortuary at Eastbourne Town Hall. Her body was informally identified by her landlady at the morgue the following day, and officially identified by her aunt on 22 August. The following morning, Jack Field read of the discovery of Munro's body in a local newspaper. At 10:30 a.m., both Field and Gray are known to have visited a military camp near Eastbourne, hoping to re-enlist in the army.

==== Autopsy ====
An autopsy revealed Munro had been deceased for approximately twenty-four hours before her body was discovered. She had been attacked with such savagery that both her upper and lower jaw had been fractured, and several teeth had been dislodged or loosened. In addition, Munro had been extensively bludgeoned about the head, with a fracture wound to her left cheek extending to her left temple. The first severe blow to the left side of Munro's head had rendered her unconscious, with her death resulting from injury to the brain. Her right temple had also suffered a laceration wound. Initial suspicions the murder had been sexually motivated were disproven when the coroner discovered the girl had been menstruating at the time of her murder and had not been subjected to a sexual assault.

Munro's close friend, Marion Beasley, and her uncle, Mr. Loutitt, pictured at her funeral on 26 August 1920

=== Funeral ===
Irene Munro was buried in Langley Cemetery, Eastbourne, on 26 August 1920. She was laid to rest in a white, silver-plated coffin with a plaque inscribed with her name, age, date of death, and the Biblical quote Christ dieth no more following services officiated by the Reverend W. J. Wybergh. The sole mourners to follow the funeral cortège to the cemetery were her landlady, Ada Wynniatt, her uncle, and her close friend, Marion Ada Beasley—both of whom had travelled from London to attend the funeral. Munro's mother was too distraught to attend the services, but did send a wreath.

Approximately 400 mourners lined the streets to pay their respects as the funeral cortège proceeded from the home of Munro's landlady to the cemetery.

=== Investigation ===
Having discovered the decedent's identity and learned via Mrs Wynniatt of Munro's intentions to visit Hampden Park, investigators visited numerous local cinemas, lodgings, and private hotels in their enquiries. Questioning the barmaids of the Albemarle Hotel revealed two local men named Billy and Jack had been regular patrons at the hotel's saloon bar in the weeks prior to the murder, although neither seemed to spend much. According to the barmaids, both men had been "broke" when they had visited the premises just hours prior to Munro's murder on 19 August. "Billy" had been wearing a herringbone suit; "Jack" had worn a dark suit and a cloth cap. Both had remained at the Albermarle until approximately 2:30 p.m., with Billy becoming flirtatious with one of the young barmaids, a Miss Dorothy Ducker, whom he affectionately referred to as "Dolly". When they returned to the bar that evening, both men had been "flush" with money which they had been "fairly throwing about". Both drank bottled beers and purchased drinks for the barmaids and acquaintances as they smoked expensive Turkish cigarettes.

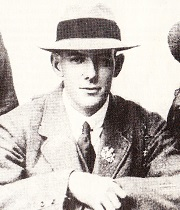
William Gray. Gray and Jack Field were executed by hanging at Wandsworth Prison for Munro's murder on 4 February 1921.

Ducker also recalled that shortly before the two had left the premises at 2:30 p.m., she had refused to serve the two men a free drink. In response, the two had promised to return to the bar later that evening, with Billy stating to Ducker: "Very well, if you wait until the evening, we shall have more money by then." Upon their return, Ducker noted Billy's hands were "filthy dirty," to which he had claimed Jack had pushed him into the sea a few hours previously.

Police enquiries soon established Munro had been seen by numerous individuals talking with two men in the early afternoon of 19 August. Five of these witnesses were labourers who had been working on the Crumbles on the afternoon of the murder and who had seen Munro walking along the light railway line in the direction from Eastbourne. According to these witnesses, the girl had glanced in their direction and smiled as she passed them before reaching to stroke a stray kitten before the trio continued walking in the direction of Pevensey. Each unhesitantly identified Munro as being the girl they had seen with the two men. One of these men had been notably older than the other, who had been closer to the girl's age. Although the clothing the younger of the men had worn could not be precisely described beyond the fact it was most likely a blue suit, the older man had worn a new suit with a distinctive herringbone pattern. The individual walking arm in arm with Munro had been carrying a stick with a metal ferrule shaped like a dog's head at one end.

Another witness, Frederick Wells, informed Chief Inspector Mercer on 23 August he had also seen Munro walking in the direction of the Crumbles in the company of these men, the younger of whom he had often seen in Eastbourne in the fortnight prior to the murder, adding this individual often carried a yellow stick with a Bulldog's head upon the handle. Wells added he had last seen the trio climb beneath a fence some fifty yards from the railway line crossing the shingle. On 24 August, Wells accompanied police around Eastbourne, where he soon observed the two men talking to three young women. Wells indicated to police these were the two men he had seen in Munro's company five days earlier.

==== Initial release ====
Police arrested both Field and Gray on suspicion of murder on the afternoon of 24 August. The two were driven to Eastbourne's Latimer Road Police Station, where Field is known to have remarked to an inspector: "We have been expecting this, as we both wear grey suits." Both men provided detailed statements regarding their movements on the early afternoon of 19 August, in which each claimed to have been in the company of the other at the Albemarle before returning to Gray's home, where they had eaten a meal prepared by Gray's wife before spending the remainder of the day at the Hippodrome. The five labourers who had seen Munro walking along the light railway line failed to identify either Field or Gray from an identity parade, and both were initially released from custody on 26 August. (Note: On the evening of their release, both Field and Gray visited the Pier Hotel with an acquaintance. Field is known to have bragged to this individual of their release from custody, before Gray boasted to their acquaintance: "Yes, I shall be getting into trouble with [Field] before long.")

=== Further witness statements ===
Investigators had obtained ample eyewitness testimony from individuals disproving the statements made by both men, as several witnesses recollected having seen the two men leaving the Albemarle and boarding a bus travelling in the direction of the Archery Tavern. Police spoke with the bus conductor, George Blackmer, who informed investigators he knew both men well and confirmed the two had indeed alighted his bus outside the Archery Tavern, although contrary to their witness statements, the two had not simply walked along Pevensey Road, but that a teenage girl with dark hair, wearing a black straw hat and carrying a green coat over her arm, had walked from the bus shelter to greet them, saying, "Hullo, Jack!" Shown a photograph of Munro, Blackmer positively identified her as the girl who had approached Field and Gray at the Archery Tavern.

On 30 August, a sailor named William Putland informed his commanding officer he had observed Munro—whose face he recognised from newspaper articles—as being in the company of two men while he had been on leave in Eastbourne. Putnam's statement was duly forwarded to Eastbourne Police, and Chief Inspector Mercer interviewed this individual on 2 September. Two days later, Putnam accompanied police around Eastbourne. Observing two men drinking tea at a coffee-stall, Putnam positively identified the younger man as being the individual he had observed walking arm in arm with Munro, adding that although he was now wearing a trilby hat, he had been wearing a soft cap on 19 August. Shown a number of hats and caps at the police station, Putnam pointed to a make identical to the one described by eyewitnesses as being the one the younger of the two men seen with Munro had worn on the day of her murder.

"You have had my statement, and you are no man not to believe it. I kept quiet before, but I shall not this time. I have told you the truth."
--Jack Field, speaking to Chief Inspector George Mercer upon being informed he was to be charged with the murder of Irene Munro. 4 September 1920

=== Arrest ===
No individuals could be found to corroborate the accounts both men gave to police regarding their movements on 19 August, with investigators also discovering Field and Gray had attempted to persuade a local servant girl to claim she had been in their company at the time of the murder. Multiple eyewitness accounts placed the two men in the company of Munro, walking in the direction of the Crumbles where her body was discovered the following day. Furthermore, two of these witnesses also stated Field had been carrying a distinctive yellow walking stick with a ferrule shaped like a dog's head at one end. A search of Field's home recovered this item, and distinctive articles of clothing described by eyewitnesses as being worn by the men in Munro's company were recovered at the homes of both men. In light of these developments, both men were rearrested and charged with Munro's murder on the evening of 4 September.

The official inquest into Munro's death resumed on 6 September. At this hearing, the jury returned verdicts of wilful murder against both defendants. Both were held on remand at Maidstone Gaol.

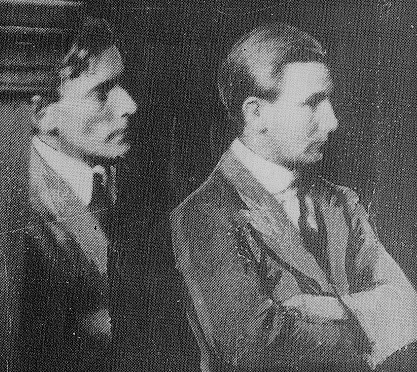
Gray (left) and Field (right), pictured at their trial for Munro's murder, December 1920

=== Trial ===
The trial of Field and Gray for the murder of Irene Munro began at Lewes Assizes on 13 December 1920. Both men were tried before Mr Justice Avory, and both pleaded not guilty to the charge.

In his opening statement on behalf of the Crown, prosecutor Charles Gill outlined the lives of both defendants, describing the two as unemployed ex-servicemen and close companions with a history of petty theft and robbery before describing how Munro had travelled to Eastbourne for a fortnight's holiday on 16 August and her encounter with the defendants three days later.

Referring to the afternoon of the murder, Gill referred to the statements both men had given to police on the date of their initial arrest and how these statements almost identically tallied as to their whereabouts within Pevensey at the time of the murder, although numerous independent eyewitnesses would testify they had seen the two men in the company of Munro walking in the direction of and upon the Crumbles, proving their statements were deliberately inaccurate. Gill further stated the evidence would prove the defendants had actively sought to concoct a false alibi.

==== Witness testimony ====
On the second day of the trial, a Dr Cadman testified as to his examination of Munro's body as it lay upon the Crumbles at 11:00 p.m. on 20 August. Cadman stated that rigor mortis was so well established he was unable to move the limbs, adding his opinion the girl had been deceased for between twelve and twenty-four hours. Upon cross-examination by Gray's defence counsel, Edward Marshall Hall, Cadman conceded his initial estimation implied the girl could not have been murdered prior to 11:00 p.m. on 19 August. In rebuttal, Charles Gill succeeding in Cadman conceding he had based his estimation upon the time of death solely upon the fact blood had flown from Munro's left nostril when her body was removed from the crime scene to the mortuary, and that he would have expected blood within the body of an individual deceased more than twenty-four hours to have completely coagulated.

To further discredit the testimony of Dr Cadman, a Dr James Adams testified on behalf of the prosecution that, having conducted the official post-mortem of Munro's body on 21 August, he was in no doubt her death had occurred sometime between 3:30 p.m. and 5:30 p.m. on 19 August. When asked to give his opinion as to the fluid discharge from the girl's nose, Adams stated the discharge had been a serum resembling blood. A further medical expert to conduct a later post-mortem upon Munro's body named Reginald Elworthy also testified on the second day of the hearings. Elworthy's testimony precisely matched that of Adams, with this doctor adding that if Dr Cadman had measured the temperature inside the girl's body, he would have been more precise as to the time of death.

The two Albemarle Hotel barmaids, Dorothy Ducker and Elsie Finley, testified before the court as to the movements of the defendants on the date of Munro's murder, adding that on the second time they had been in the hotel's saloon bar, both men had been spending extravagantly and smoking expensive cigarettes. The testimony of these witnesses was followed by numerous eyewitnesses who testified as to seeing two men in the company of Munro—either or both of whom each witness was able to positively identify. A servant girl named Hilda Maud Baxter then testified as to the efforts of both defendants—whom she had not known—to persuade her to construct a false alibi, adding there was no truth in the claims of both men to have been in her company at Pevensey on the afternoon of the murder. Baxter's testimony was corroborated by two other servant girls, who each testified Baxter had not left their employers' property on the afternoon of 19 August.

==== Defendant's testimony ====
Neither Field nor Gray seemed particularly interested in the legal proceedings, and although Gray chose not to testify in his own defence, upon the advice of his defence counsel, J. D. Cassels, Field took the stand to testify in his own defence on 15 December. Responding to questioning from his defence counsel, Field recounted his movements between 18 and 20 August. He admitted to having little money on the dates in question, although he denied having ever met Irene Munro, or having been on the Crumbles that week; insisting that although he and Gray had indeed alighted a bus outside the Archery Tavern on the afternoon of 19 August, both had visited a nearby circus, arriving at this venue at approximately 2:45 p.m. Field insisted that all the money he had spent on these dates had been from the weekly unemployment benefit payment of 29 shillings he had received on the morning of the murder. Field admitted he and Gray had attempted to re-enlist in the army on 21 August, but claimed the reason had been that Gray's pension had recently been reduced, and that he also knew his unemployment benefit would not continue indefinitely.

When questioned as to earlier witness testimony placing both men in the company of Munro on the afternoon of 19 August, walking to the location upon the Crumbles where her body was discovered the following day, Field insisted this testimony was inaccurate. He also stated the reason he and Gray had attempted to persuade Hilda Baxter to provide them with an alibi prior to their arrest had been because the two had "seen no one" whom they knew in Pevensey on the afternoon of 19 August and the two had therefore feared their alibi would not be believed.

Following the conclusion of Field's testimony, a fellow prisoner who had become acquainted with Gray while on remand at Maidstone Gaol testified Gray had confessed to him he had "been with the girl almost to the hour [the murder] happened", adding he intended to persuade another inmate to claim he had seen Munro in the company of a sailor upon the Crumbles prior to her murder, as police could not prove he had committed the crime. According to this prisoner, Gray denied murdering the girl, although he knew she had been murdered "by dropping a stone on her head" as he had seen the actual brick with which she had been murdered. Another prisoner also testified as to Gray's efforts to persuade him to testify he and Field had been to a circus with him on 19 August. Two warders from Maidstone Gaol then testified they had observed more than one illicit conversation between Gray and one of the prisoners.

==== Closing arguments ====
On 17 December, both counsel delivered their closing arguments to the jury. Charles Gill spoke first, outlining the numerous witnesses who testified as to having seen the two defendants with Munro shortly before the time several medical experts had testified she had been murdered and the defendants' subsequent efforts to concoct a false alibi as to their whereabouts at this time. Gill contended the proof Munro had been murdered between 3:30 p.m. and 5:30 p.m. was "overwhelming", adding that had Munro been murdered in the evening, as the defence contended, she would undoubtedly have returned to her lodgings for her afternoon meal. Referring to the testimony from one of the prisoners who stated Gray had informed him Munro had been murdered with a large stone dropped upon her head, Gill stated: "The prosecution is right. [Gray] knows."

Addressing the jury on behalf of Field, J. D. Cassels stated the prosecution's case on behalf of his client "rested entirely" upon circumstantial evidence, emphasising that the five labourers who had been working on the Crumbles close to where Munro had been murdered had failed to identify either defendant. Cassels outlined the inaccuracies some witnesses had provided to investigators when describing the clothing of either the decedent or the men seen in her company, before inferring the murder must have been committed at or after dusk as opposed to in broad daylight, close to a railway hut. Referring to the earlier testimony of Dr Cadman, Cassels stated that, if the jury accepted his testimony that Munro could not have been murdered prior to 11:00 p.m. on 19 August, it would be "an end to the case" for the prosecution.

Edward Marshall Hall then spoke on behalf of Gray. Outlining Munro's character, Hall stressed that it would have been unlikely that a "ladylike, educated" young woman known to have been "fastidious as to her choice of company" would have sought the acquaintance of two unemployed, unambitious and heavy drinking individuals like the defendants. Hall then focused on the medical evidence, emphasising that Dr Cadman's opinion as to Munro's time of death deserved careful consideration, adding that Munro would undoubtedly have screamed when struck across the mouth, yet nobody had reported hearing her screams, or to hearing shingle shovelled over her body after her death. Referring to the prosecution contention that the motive for the murder was robbery and the testimony from Dorothy Ducker that his client had promised her he and Field would "have more money" by the late afternoon of 19 August, Hall contended Munro was not worth robbing, and no evidence existed of premeditation. Hall finished his closing argument by stating that if the jury could not accept the evidence put forward by the prosecution as conclusive, both Gray and Field were entitled to a verdict of not guilty.

=== Conviction ===
The trial lasted five days. In a final address to the jury on 17 December, Judge Avory informed the panel both men were jointly charged with Munro's murder, with one defendant aiding and abetting the other, adding that it was "immaterial" which defendant actually murdered the girl. Judge Avory also instructed the jury not to allow their decision to be influenced by any material pertaining to the murder they had read, stating: "I warn you only to bring in a verdict of guilty if satisfied beyond all reasonable doubt as to [the defendants'] guilt." The jury then retired to consider their verdict.

The jury deliberated for just over one hour before finding both men guilty of Munro's murder, although due to their belief no evidence of premeditation existed, the jury recommended mercy for both defendants. Upon hearing the verdicts, the faces of both men blanched, with Field visibly grasping the dock-rail to steady himself.

In formally passing the death sentence against both men, Mr Justice Avory stated: "Jack Alfred Field and William Thomas Gray, you have been found guilty of a foul and brutal murder, and the defence you have [both] concocted has been demonstrated to be untrue. My duty is now to pass upon you the sentence of the law. That sentence is that you be taken hence to a lawful prison, and thence to a place of execution, and that you be there hanged by the neck until you be dead, and that your bodies be afterwards buried within the precincts of the prison wherein you shall have been last confined before your execution, and I direct that this sentence shall be carried out at Wandsworth Prison. And may the Lord have mercy upon your souls."

=== Motive ===
The motive for Munro's murder was robbery. Both men had been unemployed for extended periods of time following their respective discharge from the armed forces. (Note: In the year prior to murdering Irene Munro, Field had been discharged from the navy, whereas Gray had previously served with the South African Artillery before relocating to England.) Neither held any inclination to actually work for a living, and shortly after the two had become acquainted in June 1920, both had developed a habit of committing opportunistic petty theft and, in the fortnight prior to murdering Munro, of befriending and robbing tourists.

Field had struck Munro across the face when she had refused to release her handbag—containing approximately £2 10s—after Gray attempted to steal the bag from her possession after the two had lured the girl to a secluded location. Gray had been the individual to fatally bludgeon Munro, although Field had initiated the actual physical assault by striking Munro across the mouth with the ferrule of his walking stick. (Note: Field would later state he was uncertain whether Munro had died as a result of Gray bludgeoning her about the head with the ironstone brick, or whether she had actually died of smothering when the two had buried her body beneath the beach shingle.)

=== Appeals ===
Both men filed appeals against their convictions. These appeals were heard on 17 and 18 January 1921. Each blamed the other for Munro's murder at these hearings. According to Field, he and Gray had first seen Munro walking along the sea-front on 17 August, and had become acquainted with her the following day. Field's appeal also contended the two had been in Munro's company on the afternoon of the murder, although he had left Munro alone with Gray on the Crumbles and that later on the afternoon of the murder, he had walked toward Pevensey Bay, where he encountered Gray, who informed him the two had had a quarrel, and Munro had "gone home". He had not known of Gray's true intentions towards Munro, although Gray had subsequently confessed to him he had "stunned" Munro before burying her alive.

Gray denied these accusations; his appeal alleged he had parted company with Field at the Albemarle Hotel at approximately 2:30 p.m. before returning alone to his home. According to Gray, he did not see Field again until 6:40 p.m. Gray further alleged Field had later confessed to him that he had walked with Munro onto the Crumbles, where he had said something which displeased the girl, causing her to slap him across the face. He had then struck the girl, rendering her unconscious and, fearing Munro would report him to the police, had then struck her head with the ironstone brick, "putting her right out", before burying her body.

==== Execution ====
The Lord Chief Justice rejected these appeals on 18 January, describing the renewed accounts of events by both men as desperate, last-ditch fabrications concocted to escape the consequences of their crime by placing blame upon the other. Both men were executed at Wandsworth Prison at 8:00 a.m. on 4 February. Two reporters were permitted to witness the executions, and approximately 200 members of the public awaited official notification outside the jail.

Contemporary reports indicate both men walked stoically and unassisted to the scaffold. Neither man confessed to Munro's murder before his execution, although both left a message of gratitude in their cells for the letters and expressions of sympathy they had received from family and friends as they awaited their execution.

== Murder of Emily Kaye ==
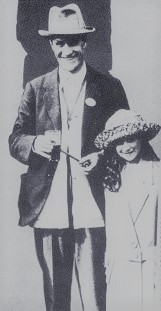
Patrick Mahon, pictured with his daughter in 1923

=== Early life ===
Patrick Mahon was born in Edge Hill, Liverpool to middle-class Irish parents, in 1890. He was raised in the suburb of West Derby. As a child, Mahon proved to be an above average scholar and a talented footballer. He was also a regular attendee of the local Catholic church.

Shortly after leaving school, Mahon secured employment as a bookkeeper. He later became a church worker and Sunday school teacher. Mahon married his fiancée, Jessie, whom he had first met at school, on 6 April 1910. The couple had two children. The same year, Mahon was arrested for burgling the home of a clergyman.

==== Criminal background ====
In 1911, Mahon stole £123 from his employers, abandoning his wife and eloping to the Isle of Man with another woman. He was treated with leniency by authorities for this crime, receiving a formal caution. Mahon's wife also forgave him, and he returned to live with her, securing employment at a Wiltshire dairy firm. He lost this employment in 1912 after his employers discovered he had stolen £60. For this offence, Mahon was imprisoned for one year. Upon his release, Mahon and his wife relocated to the town of Calne, where their two children were born. While living in Calne, Mahon developed a gambling habit.

In 1916, Mahon is known to have committed the attempted murder of a servant girl in the Surrey town of Chertsey. In this instance, the girl discovered Mahon burgling her employers' home, whereupon he attacked her with a hammer, striking her across the head a minimum of nine times. Before the girl lost consciousness, Mahon asked her where the keys to her employers' safe were kept.

The victim of this assault regained consciousness to find herself being embraced by Mahon, who implored her to forgive him.

Mahon was brought to trial before Mr Justice Darling for this aggravated assault. Medical testimony at this trial revealed that Mahon had likely intended to kill this young woman, and had she not had such a generous head of hair, she would likely have died of her injuries. Mahon appealed for leniency, stating his intentions to join the army. However, he was sentenced to a term of five years' imprisonment, with Judge Darling stating as he imposed this term: "I have come to the conclusion that you are not only a burglar, not only a coward, but also a thorough-paced hypocrite". (Note: While incarcerated to this offence, Mahon's infant son died of natural causes. Mahon did not serve the full term of this sentence.)

=== Employment ===
Mahon was released from prison in April 1919. He returned to his wife, who by this stage worked as a secretary at the Sunbury-on-Thames firm Consols Automatic Aerators Ltd. Jessie Mahon secured her husband employment as a salesman at this firm, and the family relocated from Calne to the London suburb of Richmond.

==== Encounter with Emily Kaye ====
In 1922, Mahon was promoted to the position of sales manager, earning approximately £42 per month. Mahon's duties regularly required him to travel to the City of London, to the offices of Robertson, Hill and Co. in Moorgate. During an August 1923 visit to this firm, he encountered a 37-year-old unmarried woman named Emily Beilby Kaye, who worked as a shorthand typist and private secretary to the father of author Ian Hay. Within weeks of their encounter, the two had begun an affair. (Note: Kaye was born 26 November 1885. She was 37 years old at the time of her initial acquaintance with Mahon, and 38 years old at the time of her murder.)

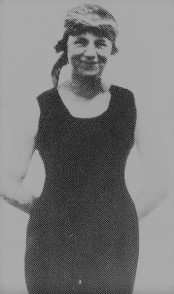
Emily Beilby Kaye

Kaye was just one of several women with whom Mahon conducted affairs throughout the course of his marriage, and Mahon—who introduced himself to Kaye as Derek Patterson—likely embarked upon this affair upon discovering Kaye had savings estimated at £500 (the equivalent of approximately £26,300 as of 2026). Originally from Chorlton-cum-Hardy, she had lived in London for less than a year before encountering Mahon.

=== Affair and pregnancy ===
Approximately three months after Mahon and Kaye embarked upon their affair, Kaye discovered, to her joy, that she was pregnant. In March, Kaye became ill with influenza. To recuperate, she travelled to the coastal resort town of Bournemouth, where she was soon joined by Mahon, who presented her with a diamond and sapphire cluster engagement ring he had earlier purchased from a Southampton jeweller's. That night, the two shared a room at the South Western Hotel, with Mahon signing the register as Mr and Mrs P. H. Mahon.

Mahon's purchasing of an engagement ring seems to have convinced Kaye that Mahon's claims of his intentions to marry her were sincere. Upon her return to work, Kaye informed friends and relatives she and Mahon would soon marry and emigrate to South Africa, stating to the company secretary, "It's fixed, my dear — the [wedding] date!" On 5 April, Kaye wrote a letter to her sister in which she stated Mahon had travelled to Langney to inspect a bungalow with a view to renting the property for several weeks as they finalised their plans to emigrate. She is also known to have withdrawn £404 of her savings in February 1924—the vast majority of this money was either given to Mahon or spent or otherwise invested in her plans for the future she believed the two had together.

==== Officer's House ====
According to Mahon, upon Kaye informing him of her pregnancy, he became afraid of his wife yet again discovering his infidelity. However, he claimed Kaye had known he was a married man prior to their affair and that, shortly after Kaye discovered she was pregnant, she had insisted on the two embarking upon what she termed a "love experiment" whereby she could convince him his resistance to abandoning his wife and daughter could be overcome if the two spent an extended period of time alone before they bigamously married. (Note: Mahon would later claim Kaye had first insisted upon their embarking on this love experiment in early April 1924.) Likely as a means of premeditation with regards to murdering Kaye, Mahon agreed to this proposal, and successfully convinced her to travel to an Eastbourne bungalow known as Officer's House, located alongside the Crumbles, which he had rented under the assumed name of Waller.

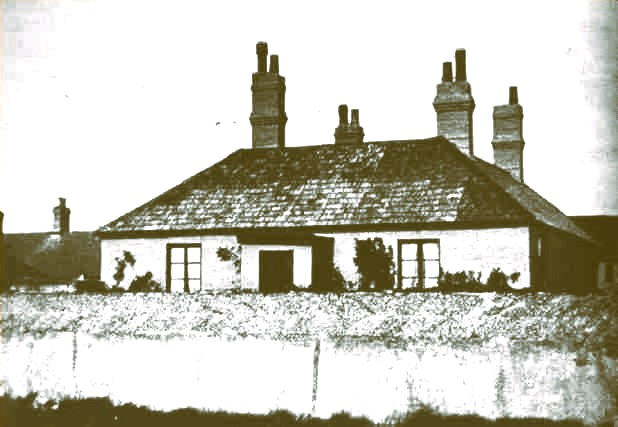
Officer's House, seen here in 1924

Kaye is known to have travelled to Eastbourne on 7 April. She stayed for five days at the Kenilworth Court Hotel before travelling to Officer's House on 12 April. Having informed his wife he was to travel "on business" for several days, Mahon also travelled to the bungalow on the weekend of 12–13 April, informing Kaye via telegram to meet him at Eastbourne railway station. Prior to travelling to Eastbourne, Mahon is known to have purchased a ten-inch chef's knife and a tenon saw from an ironmonger's located close to London Victoria station.

=== Murder ===
On 14 April, Kaye is known to have penned a letter to a friend, indicating she and Mahon planned to travel to London the following day in order that Mahon could obtain a passport, adding that "[Mahon] in particular wants to get to Paris for Easter" and that the two should have "about a fortnight" in Eastbourne before emigrating to South Africa. Mahon would later inform investigators he had initially agreed to Kaye's request to obtain a passport, although in London, he changed his mind, and the couple returned to Eastbourne.

Mahon later gave several differing accounts of Kaye's murder to investigators, both in detail of the events surrounding her death, and the actual date of the crime. At his subsequent trial, he testified that upon their return to Officer's House on 15 April, he had brought the coal scuttle into the living room, then lit a fire as Kaye wrote a further letter to her friend. When Kaye had finished composing this letter, she turned towards him, insisting he write a letter to his friends, informing them of his decision to relocate to South Africa. Mahon refused, resulting in Kaye becoming agitated, stating: "Pat, I'm determined to settle this matter one way or the other tonight. Can't you realise, Pat, how much I love you?" Mahon then informed Kaye of his intentions to go to sleep. She had then thrown an axe at him, missing. A scuffle ensued, in which each grabbed the other by the throat. The two then fell over a deckchair, with Kaye fatally striking her head across the coal scuttle. According to Mahon, upon failing to revive her, he only realised "towards daybreak or at daybreak" what "a fool" he had been to not attempt to seek medical assistance. He had then covered Kaye's body with a fur coat before, on 18 April, severing her head and legs and stowing her body in a travelling trunk as he continued to ponder his predicament.

On 16 April, Mahon invited a woman with whom he had recently become acquainted named Ethel Duncan to spend the Easter weekend at the bungalow with him. Duncan agreed, and the following day, Mahon sent her a telegraphic order for £4 and a telegram with instructions to meet him at Eastbourne railway station the following evening. Duncan was waiting at the station when Mahon arrived at approximately 7:50 p.m. on 18 April. She noted his wrist was bandaged, which Mahon claimed was a result of his saving a lady from falling off a bus that morning.

Mahon and Duncan spent three days at Officer's House, with Mahon spending extravagantly, insisting the two dine nightly at lavish restaurants and on one occasion, visiting the London Palladium. The two parted company on Easter Monday. Mahon then returned to Officer's House, where he proceeded to dismember Kaye's body.

==== Dismemberment ====
Over the following week, Kaye's body was extensively dismembered. Her head, feet and legs were incinerated within the fireplace of the bungalow on 22 April before Mahon swept the charred skull and bone fragments into a dustpan. (Note: Mahon would later recollect to investigators he had incinerated these sections of Kaye's body in the midst of a thunderstorm, adding that when he had placed Kaye's head on the fire, her eyes opened at the precise moment a burst of thunder erupted overhead, causing him to run from the room in terror.) He later pulverised these sections of Kaye's body into "tremendously small" fragments which he claimed to have discarded over the garden wall of Officer's House. No sections of Kaye's skull were ever recovered, although a section of her jawbone and several of her teeth were later recovered from a refuse heap. The majority of her uterus was likewise never found.

Mahon returned to the bungalow on 26 April to continue dismembering Kaye's body. He first severed the arms from the torso, before dismembering the trunk of her body. Some sections of her body were boiled on this date. These portions were placed in a brown bag, which Mahon later threw from the window of a railway carriage while returning to his home in Richmond.

==== Initial discoveries ====
In the years following Mahon's 1919 release from prison, his wife had grown increasingly suspicious of the extensive periods of time Mahon spent away from home upon the excuse of business trips. Suspecting her husband was again conducting an affair and/or gambling, Jessie Mahon hired a former detective inspector named John Beard to investigate her husband on 30 April 1924.

Searching through the pockets of one of her husband's suits on 1 May, Jessie discovered a racecard and a left-luggage ticket, dated 28 April, for a bag currently deposited at Waterloo station. Presenting the ticket to Beard, the two travelled to Waterloo station to inspect the Gladstone bag which, although locked, was observed to contain a large knife and bloodstained cloth. Beard persuaded Jessie to return the ticket to her husband's suit, before contacting Scotland Yard to report his discovery. An Inspector Percy Savage extracted a small sample of cloth from the bag to undergo forensic analysis. The analysis of this sample revealed the stains to be human blood. Two undercover policemen were then deployed at the station with instructions to arrest Mahon when he arrived to collect the bag.

=== Arrest ===
At 6:15 p.m. on 2 May, Mahon was arrested when he arrived at Waterloo station and attempted to pay 5d to retrieve this bag. Confirming the bag was his property, Mahon was escorted to Kennington police station to await the arrival of Inspector Savage. He was then taken to Scotland Yard both for interrogation and in order that the contents of his bag could be inspected. When opened, the contents were revealed to be female clothing and a cook's knife, all of which was heavily stained with blood and grease and sprinkled with disinfectant. A canvas racket bag bearing Kaye's initials was also recovered from the bag.

Questioned as to why the contents included a knife and clothing heavily stained with blood, Mahon stated: "I'm fond of dogs. I suppose I carried home meat for [our pet] dogs in it." In response, Inspector Savage replied: "Dog's meat? But this is human blood. You don't wrap dog's meat in silk. Your explanation doesn't satisfy me."

"I wonder ... if you can realise how terrible a thing it is for one's body to be active, and one's mind ... to fail to act?"
--Patrick Mahon, conversing with Inspector Percy Savage shortly before formally confessing to the murder of Emily Kaye. 2 May 1924

==== Confession ====
Although initially evasive in response to how these bloodstained items came to be in his possession, after several hours of questioning, Mahon suddenly became silent before remarking, "I'm considering my position." He again became silent for almost fifteen minutes before stating: "I suppose you know everything. I'll tell you the truth." He then proceeded to confess to his role in Kaye's death, which he claimed had been accidental, having been caused when, in the course of a scuffle, the two had fallen over a deckchair, with Kaye hitting her head against an iron coal scuttle he had brought into the room earlier that afternoon. Her body, he stated, could be found at the bungalow he had rented in Eastbourne. (Note: Contemporary records indicate Mahon collapsed midway through providing his confession. He completed his written confession at approximately 2 a.m. on 3 May.)

According to Mahon, for "several hours", he unsuccessfully attempted to revive Kaye before opting to dismember her body with a blunt knife already present at the bungalow. He then claimed to have purchased the chef's knife and tenon saw in London before returning to Officer's House where, on 20 April, he had begun to dismember and dispose of Kaye's body. (Note: In the days following Kaye's murder, another of Mahon's lovers is known to have observed that Mahon's shoulders and arms were extensively bruised.) Mahon claimed to have ultimately decided to dispose of the dissected portions by discarding them through the windows of railway carriages, and had successfully disposed of some sections of Kaye's legs in this manner on 1 May. He had intended to dispose of the contents of his gladstone bag in the same manner when arrested at Waterloo station that morning.

=== Discovery ===
Upon receiving Mahon's confession, investigators travelled to Sussex. Having liaised with their counterparts within the East Sussex Constabulary, police travelled to Officer's House. The same day, sections of Kaye's putrefied and dismembered body were found within a travelling trunk engraved with her initials. Inspector Savage placed the trunk in the scullery of the property before contacting Scotland Yard. Forensic pathologist Sir Bernard Spilsbury arrived in Eastbourne on 4 May to assist in the recovery and examination of the remains.

==== Crime scene examination ====
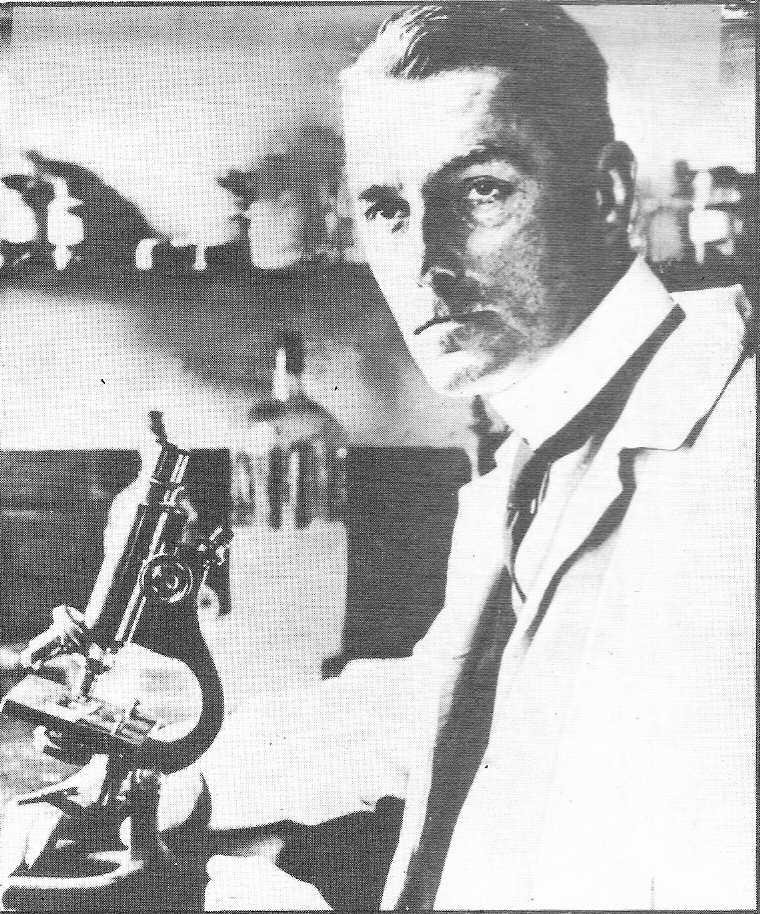
Sir Bernard Spilsbury, c. 1925

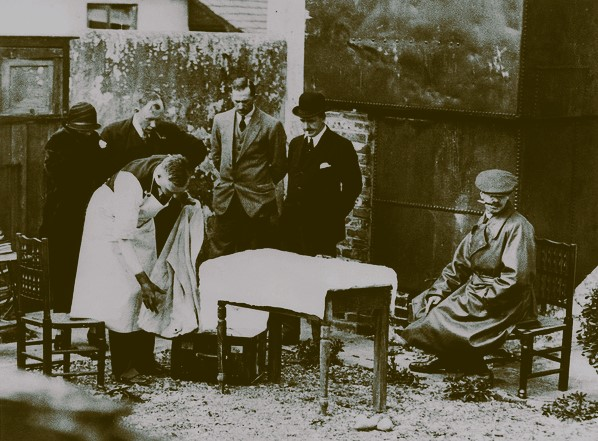
Spilsbury (foreground), pictured conducting the forensic examination of Officer's House, Eastbourne. 4 May 1924.

In the bedroom of Officer's House, investigators recovered a "rusty and greasy" tenon saw with a section of flesh still attached, plus numerous articles of bloodstained female clothing and a bloodstained tea towel. A saucer containing solid human fat was discovered upon the floor of the dining room, and a two-gallon saucepan containing a section of boiled flesh was found within the fireplace of this room. The fender of this fireplace was also spattered with body fat, and an examination of the ashes revealed over nine hundred small, charred fragments of human bone. (Note: At Mahon's trial, Spilsbury stated: "I am satisfied that the skull and the bones of the skull and upper part of the neck were not present" among the charred fragments of bone recovered from the fireplace.) A hat box recovered from the scullery was found to contain thirty-seven sections of boiled human flesh, muscle and bone, including a scapula, a vertebra, and a humerus. Each bone had evidently been severed with a saw.

Inside the travelling trunk, Spilsbury discovered four large sections of Kaye's body, including her lower left abdomen and pelvis, a section of her spine, the right section of her torso with the upper portion of her femur still attached, a portion of the right side of her chest including the majority of her entire rib cage, and the left section of Kaye's chest, which Spilsbury noted to be extensively bruised around the shoulder. Several organs, including a portion of Kaye's right lung and sections of her kidneys, were attached to the wall of the trunk. Other organs—including her heart—were recovered from a biscuit tin. Furthermore, the doorway and carpet of the living room were heavily bloodstained. Each item was catalogued and removed to Spilsbury's London laboratory for reassembly. (Note: Spilsbury is known to have described the dissected remains of Emily Kaye as the "most gruesome" he ever encountered in his career as a pathologist.)

Upon reassembling these sections of Kaye's body at the mortuary, Spilsbury discovered some sections of her body had been boiled, with others burned. Although Spilsbury was able to reconstruct the recovered sections of Kaye's body, as her head was not recovered, he was unable to determine the actual cause of death, although he was able to conclude she had not died as a result of a disease. Furthermore, by examining Kaye's breasts and the one ovary recovered at Officer's House, Spilsbury was able to determine she had been in the early stages of pregnancy at the time of her murder.

=== Formal charge ===
Mahon was formally charged with Kaye's murder on 6 May. He responded to this charge by stating, "I've already made my statement. It wasn't murder, as my statement clearly shows." A trial date was set for 15 July.

=== Trial ===
The trial of Patrick Mahon for the murder of Emily Kaye began before Mr. Justice Avory at Sussex Assizes on 15 July 1924. He pleaded not guilty to the charge. Sir Henry Curtis-Bennett was the chief prosecutor. Mahon was defended by J. D. Cassels.

In their opening statement on behalf of the Crown, Henry Curtis-Bennett outlined the prosecution's case against the accused, alleging Mahon had embarked on an affair with Kaye for the sole purpose of robbing her of her savings, adding records to be introduced into evidence would reveal Mahon had received four separate payments of £100 from Kaye in the months before her murder, and that he had cashed at least three of these payments under the alias of Derek Patterson. The prosecution further stated Kaye's murder had clearly been premeditated as, contrary to Mahon's claims, testimony and evidence would be introduced proving he had encouraged Kaye to state to acquaintances she and "Derek Patterson" would soon emigrate to South Africa, and that he had purchased the chef's knife and tenon saw used to dismember Kaye's body on 12 April, contrary to his claims to police he had bought the items after her death, on 17 April.

==== Medical testimony ====
Bernard Spilsbury testified on the third day of Mahon's trial. He supported the prosecution's contention that Kaye could not have sustained any fatal injuries from falling upon the coal scuttle, dismissing Mahon's claim that Kaye's death had been accidental as "preposterous". Spilsbury testified the extensive bruising about one of Kaye's shoulders led him to suspect he had bludgeoned Kaye to death with an axe handle missing from the bungalow and which, along with her skull, was never found. Spilsbury further stated that, contrary to Mahon's claim that Kaye had thrown an axe at him prior to the two engaging in a scuffle, no walls, doors or doorframes within Officer's House bore evidence of being struck by an axe.

==== Defendant's testimony ====
Mahon chose to testify in his own defence on 17 July. He would testify for over five hours; emphatically denying Kaye's death had been an act of murder. Mahon insisted he had not rented the bungalow as a means of providing privacy with which to murder Kaye, but that he had rented the property for two months as a means of maintaining his affair with her with view to later bringing his wife to the property. He claimed Kaye's death had been accidental, having been the culmination of a heated argument in which he had "seen red" after Kaye had thrown an axe at him before the two had grappled and Kaye had fatally struck her head against the iron coal scuttle. Mahon admitted having purchased the chef's knife and tenon saw with which he had dismembered Kaye's body, but insisted he had only purchased these instruments after her death. Repeating his claim Kaye's death had been accidental, Mahon collapsed in the dock.

On 18 July, Sir Henry Curtis-Bennett cross-examined Mahon, who remained adamant the decision to rent Officer's House had been Kaye's as a means for her to prove her love of him, and he had only acquiesced to the suggestion as a means of proving to her she "could not possibly keep or expect to keep" his affections, as he wished to remain faithful to his wife. He was unable to produce a satisfactory explanation as to why he had rented the property under an assumed name, or why he had embarked upon the affair using an alias. Directing questioning to the date Mahon had purchased the chef's knife and tenon saw, Mahon insisted the items had been bought on 17 April. In response, Curtis-Bennett produced an invoice proving the items had been purchased on 12 April.

When questioned as to why he had embarked upon an affair with Kaye, Mahon claimed that although Kaye had known he had been married, she had insisted they embark upon an affair, and he quickly realised her intentions to replace his wife, stating: "Her idea was that if we were alone together, and she could act as my wife, doing the cooking and everything, she would convince me that I could be entirely happy with her."

==== Closing arguments ====
Both prosecution and defence attorneys delivered their closing arguments before the jury on 19 July. In his closing argument before the jury, Mahon's defence counsel, J. D. Cassels, made no attempt to deny Mahon's infidelity or his intimacy with Kaye. Cassels implored the jury to consider Mahon's claims of accidental death, stating: " Have you, before you an inhuman monster, or a man who is the victim of a most extraordinary combination of circumstances?" Prosecutor Sir Henry Curtis-Bennett outlined the ample evidence of premeditation, stating the motive for Mahon embarking upon the affair had been to rob Kaye of her savings. Outlining the many inconsistencies in Mahon's account of the crime, Curtis-Bennett further contended Kaye's murder had been motivated by a necessity to silence her.

=== Conviction ===
In a final address to the jury on 19 July, Mr Justice Avory informed the panel of the evidence presented and the options they should consider. The jury then retired to consider their verdict. They debated for forty-five minutes before finding Mahon guilty of Kaye's murder. Upon hearing the jury's verdict, Mahon denounced the "bitterness and unfairness" of Mr Justice Avory's conduct, again insisting he was not guilty of murder.

In formally passing the death sentence against Mahon, Mr Justice Avory stated: "Patrick Herbert Mahon, the jury have arrived at the only proper conclusion on the evidence that was laid before them. They have arrived at the conclusion without knowing anything of your past life. There can be no question that you deliberately designed the death of this woman. For that crime you must suffer the penalty imposed by the law. The sentence of the court upon you is that you be taken from this place to a lawful prison, and then to a place of execution, and that you be there hanged by the neck until you be dead, and that your body be afterwards buried within the precincts of the prison wherein you shall have been last confined before your execution. And may the Lord have mercy upon your soul."

=== Appeal and execution ===
In August 1924, Mahon filed an appeal against his conviction. His appeal contended the jury had been misdirected by Judge Avory, who had failed to sufficiently instruct the panel to consider the possibility of Kaye's death having been accidental, and that the judge had also wrongly informed the jury Mahon had admitted Kaye had died at his hands. This appeal was rejected by the Lord Chief Justice on 19 August.

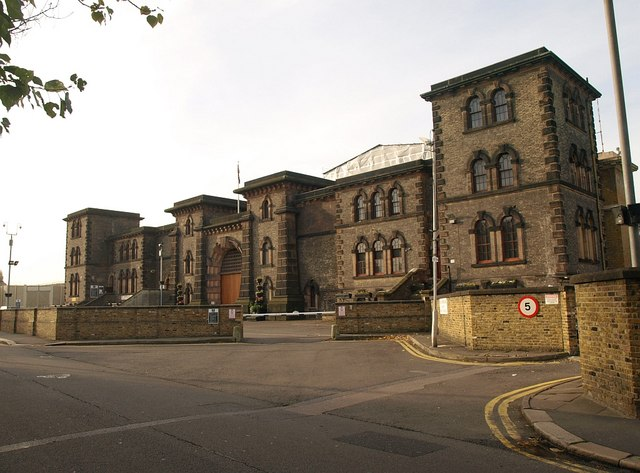
Wandsworth Prison. Mahon was executed within the grounds of this prison on 3 September 1924.

Mahon was hanged for Kaye's murder in Wandsworth Prison, London, on 3 September 1924. He protested his innocence to the end, and is known to have embarked upon a hunger strike following his conviction, also writing several letters, leaving instructions they should not be opened until after his death.

Contemporary news reports indicate Mahon walked stoically to the scaffold without uttering a word. However, anecdotal accounts suggest Mahon offered resistance upon the scaffold, apparently attempting to jump clear of the trap at the precise moment the lever was pulled.

== Legacy ==
The latter of the two Crumbles murders is remembered as a murder case which facilitated the improvement of forensic procedures for law enforcement personnel across the United Kingdom. The police response to this particular murder case ultimately resulted in the creation of a standard response kit colloquially known as a "murder bag" which was used from 1924 onwards by the Metropolitan Police Service when investigating crime scenes. According to Inspector Percy Savage, upon Sir Bernard Spilsbury's arrival at Officer's House on 4 May, he had been aghast at the lack of methods used by police to both preserve forensic evidence and prevent infection. With the assistance of both Spilsbury and a Dr Scott-Gillett, Inspector Savage compiled a list of necessary articles for inclusion within a bag to be brought to all future crime scenes by police. Other police forces across the United Kingdom subsequently adopted this forensic approach.

== Media ==
=== Literature ===
- Dilnot, G. (1928). The trial of Patrick Mahon. Geoffrey Bles. ASIN B00085AJLC.
- Duke, Winifred (1995) [1939]. Trial of Field And Gray. Butterworth & Co. ISBN 978-1-561-69168-5.
- Hodge, Harry (1994) [1954]. Famous Trials 2: Herbert Rowse Armstrong, Field and Gray, George Joseph Smith, Ronald True. Penguin Books. ISBN 978-0-140-00634-6.
- Honeycombe, Gordon (1982). The Murders of The Black Museum: 1870-1970. Hutchinson Publishing. ISBN 978-0-863-79040-9.
- Lane, Brian (1994) [1991]. The Butchers. Index. ISBN 978-1-852-27297-5.
- Oates, Jonathan (2021). Irene Munro and the Beach Murder of 1920. Independent. ISBN 979-8-534-19394-7.

=== Television ===
- Thames Television commissioned and broadcast an episode focusing upon one of the Crumbles murders as part of a series focusing upon infamous British murder cases. Written by Clive Exton and directed by Don Leaver, this episode, titled The Crumbles Murder , focuses upon the murder of Emily Kaye and was broadcast on 4 August 1976.

== See also ==
- Capital punishment in the United Kingdom
- HM Prison Wandsworth
- List of executioners

== Bibliography ==
- Adamson, Iain (1988) [1964]. A Man of Quality: A Biography of the Hon. Mr. Justice Cassels. Edgware Road, London: Frederick Muller Limited. ISBN 978-3-936-33735-8.
- Botha, Ann (2006). The Crumbles Story: A Tale of Eastbourne's Colourful Heritage. ALB Books. ISBN 978-0-955-34750-4.
- Borowitz, Albert (2002). Blood & Ink: An International Guide to Fact-based Crime Literature. Kent State University Press. ISBN 978-0-87338-693-7.
- Browne, Douglas G. (1980) [1951]. Bernard Spilsbury: His Life and Cases. George G. Harrap and Co. ISBN 978-0-245-53586-4.
- Burney, Ian; Pemberton, Neil (2016). Murder and the Making of English CSI. Johns Hopkins University Press. ISBN 978-1-421-42041-7.
- Dobbs, Gary (2020). A Date with the Hangman: A History of Capital Punishment in Britain. Pen & Sword Books. ISBN 978-1-526-74744-0.
- Evans, Colin (1996). The Casebook of Forensic Detection: How Science Solved 100 of the World's Most Baffling Crimes. New York City: John Wiley & Sons Inc. pp. 180-182. ISBN 0-471-07650-3.
- Fielding, Steven (2008). Pierrepoint: A Family of Executioners. John Blake Publishing. ISBN 978-1-844-54611-4.
- Gordon, Kevin (2026). Eastbourne Murders and Misdemeanours. Amberley Publishing. ISBN 978-1-398-12682-4.
- Gordon, Richard (2001). Great Medical Disasters. House of Stratus. pp. 81–83. ISBN 978-1-84232-519-3.
- Hickey, Eric (2003). Encyclopedia of Murder and Violent Crime. Sage Publications. ISBN 978-1-506-32020-5.
- Lane, Brian (1991). The Murder Guide: 100 Extraordinary, Bizarre and Gruesome Murders. Robinson Publishing Ltd. ISBN 978-1-85487-083-4.
- Lloyd, Georgina (1990) [1989]. With Malice Aforethought: Sixteen Cases of Premeditated Murder. Bantam Books. pp. 47–58. ISBN 978-0-553-40273-5.
- McCrery, Nigel (2013). Silent Witnesses: A History of Forensic Science. Random House Books. ISBN 978-1-847-94683-6.
- Meadley, Robert (1986). Classics in Murder: True Stories of Infamous Crime as Told by Famous Crime Writers. Ugar. ISBN 978-0-804-45643-2.
- Oates, Jonathan (2017). Tracing Villains and Their Victims: A Guide to Criminal Ancestors for Family Historians. Pen & Sword Books. ISBN 978-1-473-89256-9.
- Quigley, Christine (1996). The Corpse: A History. McFarland & Company. pp. 129–130. ISBN 978-0-786-42449-8.
- Read, Simon (2008). The Blackout Murders: The Shocking True Story. JR Books. ISBN 978-1-906-21730-3.
- Rose, Andrew (2007). Lethal Witness. Sir Bernard Spilsbury: Honorary Pathologist. Sutton Publishing. pp. 114–124. ISBN 978-0-750-94423-6.
- Vandome, Nick (1992). Crimes and Criminals. W & R Chambers Ltd. ISBN 978-0-550-17012-5.
- Wild, Ronald; Curtis-Bennett, Derek (2010). King's Counsel: The Life of Sir Henry Curtis-Bennett. Wildside Press. ISBN 978-1-434-40652-1.
- Wright, William (2019). British Murder: A Compendium: 1901-2000. Amberley Publishing. ISBN 978-1-445-68724-7.
