= Tom Tullett =

British crime journalist

Eric Vivian Tullett, known as Tom Tullett (1915 – December 1991) was a renowned British Crime Journalist. He adopted the name Tom when he joined a busy National News Desk as a Crime Reporter. He was a big man in every sense of the word, and was a much loved and respected figure in Fleet Street. One of the last investigative journalists of his day, he died in 1991.

== Biography ==
He was formerly the Chief of the Daily Mirror's Crime Bureau and was one of the best known crime reporters in Fleet Street. Prior to this he was a member of the British Criminal Investigation Department at Scotland Yard and investigated many major crimes in the UK. He therefore developed an intimate knowledge of London's underworld.

== Bibliography ==
- Portrait of a Bad Man. (The Life and Death of Ronald Chesney, an International Smuggler and Murderer)
- Murder Squad: Famous Cases of Scotland Yard's Murder Squad from Crippen to The Black Panther
- Inside Interpol
- Inside Dartmoor
- Bernard Spilsbury: His Life and Cases (Pathologist) – co-author with Douglas G Browne
- No answer from Foxtrot Eleven (Murder of Police Officers).
- Strictly Murder
- Clues to Murder: Famous Forensic Murder Cases of Professor J M Cameron
