= Jeremy Dein =

English barrister (born 1960)

Jeremy Sydney Dein, KC
- Born: June 29, 1960 (age 66); Bow, London, England
- Education: Queen Mary College
- Occupation: Barrister
- Website: www.25bedfordrow.com/site/people/profile/jeremy.dein

Jeremy Sydney Dein, KC (born 29 June 1960) is an English barrister specialising in criminal defence.

== Career ==
Jeremy Dein was called to the Bar in 1982 and took Silk in 2003. He was appointed a Recorder on 2004. He became an Old Bailey recorder in 2016. Dein is listed in Band 1 Chambers directory, and Legal 500, in Criminal Silks 2017. He is former Criminal Bar Association Director of education and has written and lectured in the UK, and internationally on criminal defence. He has conducted many homicide trials, predominantly at the Old Bailey. He practices from and is Joint Head of 25 Bedford Row Chambers.

He acted for Amy Winehouse's husband on serious charges. He also defended Eric Joyce, MP for Falkirk on charges of assault in the House of Commons. In 2013 he defended Tony McCluskie who murdered and dismembered Gemma McCluskie, his sister and a former EastEnders actor. In 2015, Dein represented Tulisa Contostavlos on charges of being involved in the supply of cocaine. Mazher Mahmood, the “Fake Sheikh” at the centre of the Sun on Sunday sting was suspended and was later jailed for tampering with evidence. In 2018 he advocated for Tommy Robinson to be released from prison over his contempt of court conviction due to "procedural deficiencies" during the trial.

== Murder, Mystery and My Family ==
Along with Sasha Wass, KC, Dein appears in the BBC One series Murder, Mystery and My Family (2018-2019), which examines historic criminal cases in order to determine if any of them resulted in a miscarriage of justice. Their submissions - Dein for the "defence" and Wass for the "prosecution" are then presented to Judge David Radford, who considers whether there are grounds to consider the convictions as being unsafe. Cases featured include those of Edward Devlin and Alfred Burns, John Dickman, Edith Thompson and Frederick Bywaters, and Herbert John Bennett.

== Personal life ==
Dein was born in Bow, in Tower Hamlets and grew up in Redbridge. He graduated from Queen Mary College, University of London in 1981. He is the first cousin of former Arsenal vice-chairman David Dein.
