= Murder, Mystery and My Family =

BBC One series

- Genre: Court show Documentary
- Presented by: Jeremy Dein KC; Sasha Wass KC
- Country of origin: United Kingdom
- Original language: English
- No. of series: 5
- No. of episodes: 50

Production
- Running time: 45 minutes

Original release
- Network: BBC One
- Release: 26 February 2018 – present

Murder, Mystery and My Family is a BBC One series featuring Sasha Wass KC and Jeremy Dein KC., which examines historic criminal convictions resulting in the death penalty in order to determine if any of them resulted in a miscarriage of justice. Their submissions – Dein for the "defence" and Wass for the "prosecution" – are then presented to Judge David Radford, who considers whether there are grounds to consider the convictions as being unsafe. Cases featured include those of Edward Devlin and Alfred Burns, John Dickman, Edith Thompson and Frederick Bywaters, and Herbert John Bennett. In 2019, it won Best Daytime Programme of the Broadcast Awards.

== Episode guide ==
=== Series 1 (2018) ===
Broadcast date	Episode	Description	Outcome
26 February 2018	1.1	Sasha and Jeremy re-investigate the case of Charlotte Bryant, tried, convicted and hanged for poisoning her husband Frederick with arsenic in Dorset, in 1935. Could it have been an accident?	Upheld
27 February 2018	1.2	The team review the infamous case of prolific petty thieves Edward Devlin and Alfred Burns, who were sentenced to death for the 1951 murder of Beatrice Rimmer in Liverpool.	Unsafe, referred to CCRC
28 February 2018	1.3	Two top criminal barristers re-investigate the trial, conviction and execution of Alfred Moore for shooting dead two police officers in a police cordon surrounding his farmhouse in 1951.	Upheld
1 March 2018	1.4	The case of the last man to be hanged at Newcastle Prison, John Dickman, is re-examined by the team. The local bookmaker was convicted of shooting dead a man on a train.	Not heard
2 March 2018	1.5	In 1922, Edith Thompson and her lover are convicted of the brutal murder of her husband Percy. In 2017, her cousin Nicki questions how safe the original convictions were.	Unsafe
5 March 2018	1.6	Sasha and Jeremy re-investigate a murder case from 1900 in Great Yarmouth. A woman who was staying in the seaside resort under an assumed name was found dead on the beach. The trial was previously dramatised in the 1989 BBC2 series Shadow of the Noose.	Upheld
6 March 2018	1.7	Jeremy and Sasha examine an alleged false confession that led to the hanging of William Burtoft for the brutal murder of Frances Levin in her Manchester home in 1933.	Unsafe
7 March 2018	1.8	The barristers scrutinise a violent burglary in 1931 that led to 54-year-old widow Annie Kempson being bludgeoned and stabbed to death in her Oxford home.	Unsafe
8 March 2018	1.9	Jeremy and Sasha examine a gang-related murder in Clapham Common in 1953 that left one teenager dead and another one facing the hangman's noose.	Upheld
9 March 2018	1.10	Jeremy and Sasha investigate a rural case of murder in County Cork, Ireland in 1894. John Twiss was hanged for the murder of James Donovan but protested his innocence to the end.	Unsafe

=== Series 2 (2019) ===
Broadcast	Episode	Description	Outcome
25 March 2019	Episode #2.1	Barristers Jeremy Dein and Sasha Wass investigate if the 15-year-old boy convicted of murdering the landlady of the local inn in the sleepy Oxfordshire hamlet of Gallowstree Green in 1921 was truly guilty.	Unsafe
26 March 2019	Episode #2.2	Barristers re-investigate the murder of a young German woman at the hands of her Greek-Cypriot mother-in-law, Styllou Christofi, in Hampstead in 1954. The murdered woman's son believes his grandmother was the victim of a miscarriage of justice.	Upheld
27 March 2019	Episode #2.3	Jeremy and Sasha examine a curious case of poisoning in Croydon in 1907 that caused the demise of an innocent family. The great-grandsons of the man convicted of the ghastly deed want to learn the truth about their ancestor.	Upheld
28 March 2019	Episode #2.4	The barristers reexamine the 1962 armed robbery of a Co-op depot in South London which resulted in an employee being shot dead. Was a career criminal 'fitted up' for murder as claimed by his widow?	Unsafe
29 March 2019	Episode #2.5	Sasha and Jeremy examine the murder of a young woman Ruby Keen in a local 'lovers lane i.e. Firs Path' in Leighton Buzzard Bedfordshire in April 1937. Her ex-boyfriend Leslie Stone was found guilty of her murder and was hanged August 13 of the same year. However, his 2 nieces believe he was innocent.	Upheld
1 April 2019	Episode #2.6	The barristers examine the tragic case of a suicide pact in Birmingham in 1942 that left a young woman dead and her married lover convicted of her murder and hanged.	Upheld
2 April 2019	Episode #2.7	The barristers explore a case involving domestic violence, adultery, revenge and murder in a Yorkshire town in 1903. 125-years on, the great-granddaughter of one of those convicted of murder wants the conviction re-examined.	Upheld
3 April 2019	Episode #2.8	Barristers Jeremy Dein and Sasha Wass investigate whether a young mother accused of poisoning her family in 1850 was hanged as a result of hearsay and gossip.	Unsafe
4 April 2019	Episode #2.9	The barristers re-examine the violent attack on an Irish Catholic man by a rival gang in Darlington in 1875. They uncover a case of revenge, murder, secret societies and a deathbed accusation.	Upheld
5 April 2019	Episode #2.10	Barristers Jeremy Dein and Sasha Wass investigate the poisoning of a man by his wife in 1930s Lincolnshire, exposed by an anonymous note.	Upheld

=== Series 3 (2019) ===
Broadcast date	Episode	Description	Outcome
25 November 2019	Episode #3.1	The barristers investigate their oldest case yet, the murder by drowning of a female passenger aboard a commercial narrow boat in Staffordshire in 1839.	Unsafe
26 November 2019	Episode #3.2	Barristers Sasha Wass and Jeremy Dein investigate the mysterious murder of a Yorkshire farm owner in the 1930s. Did a clandestine love affair lead to a brutal killing?	Upheld
27 November 2019	Episode #3.3	The barristers explore the case of a Sussex poultry farmer who buried the body of his fiancée under a chicken run in 1924 but claimed to be innocent of her murder.	Upheld
28 November 2019	Episode #3.4	The barristers examine the case of Herbert Rowse Armstrong, a lawyer and First World War veteran who was convicted and hanged for poisoning his wife in 1922.	Unsafe
29 November 2019	Episode #3.5	Barristers Sasha Wass and Jeremy Dein investigate the 1935 morphine poisoning of a care home resident in Nottingham, for which her nurse, Dorothea Waddingham, was convicted and hanged.	Upheld
2 December 2019	Episode #3.6	The barristers investigate the violent assault and murder of a teenage girl in 1918 on Eltham Common, and how a button and badge found near her body led to the conviction of a former serviceman.	Upheld
3 December 2019	Episode #3.7	Leading criminal barristers Sasha Wass and Jeremy Dein examine whether a 1927 canalside murder by a man impersonating a police officer led to a miscarriage of justice.	Upheld
4 December 2019	Episode #3.8	The barristers investigate the shooting of a gentleman farmer in rural Staffordshire in 1893. Was the attack really carried out by the 19-year-old poacher who was convicted?	Unsafe
5 December 2019	Episode #3.9	Barristers Sasha Wass and Jeremy Dein investigate whether a wealthy female tenant was poisoned by her landlord, to whom she had signed over her assets just before her death.	Upheld
6 December 2019	Episode #3.10	Criminal barristers Sasha Wass and Jeremy Dein examine the brutal murder of a landlady, for which the prime suspect, a 31-year-old mother, was convicted and hanged.	Upheld

=== Series 4 (2020) ===
Broadcast date	Episode	Description	Outcome
27 July 2020	Episode #4.1	Barristers Sasha Wass and Jeremy Dein examine an infamous Victorian murder case, where a young American woman was charged with poisoning her husband, James Maybrick, in Liverpool in 1889.	Unsafe
28 July 2020	Episode #4.2	Barristers Sasha Wass and Jeremy Dein examine the case of a young soldier who was convicted of murdering a family friend in County Durham in 1934.	Upheld
29 July 2020	Episode #4.3	Barristers Sasha Wass and Jeremy Dein reassess the case of a petty criminal who was sentenced to death for murdering a policeman in Essex in 1927.	Upheld
30 July 2020	Episode #4.4	Barristers Sasha Wass and Jeremy Dein re-examine a case from 1884 in which three men stood trial for the murder of a policeman, but only one received a death sentence.	Upheld
31 July 2020	Episode #4.5	Barristers Jeremy Dein and Sasha Wass re-examine the case against a farm labourer hanged for the murder of a travelling watch repairman in 1880.	Upheld
3 August 2020	Episode #4.6	Barristers Jeremy Dein and Sasha Wass re-examine the complex case against a Victorian auctioneer accused, along with his brother and two others, of murdering his wife.	Unsafe
4 August 2020	Episode #4.7	Barristers Jeremy Dein and Sasha Wass re-examine their oldest case yet - the murder of a military veteran by his estranged wife nearly 200 years ago.	Unsafe
5 August 2020	Episode #4.8	Barristers Jeremy Dein and Sasha Wass re-examine the drowning of a wife and mother in Victorian Bath.	Upheld
6 August 2020	Episode #4.9	Barristers Sasha Wass and Jeremy Dein re-examine an infamous case of a Dorset housewife accused of murdering her young husband.	Upheld
7 August 2020	Episode #4.10	Barristers Sasha Wass and Jeremy Dein investigate their first Scottish case, the murder of a reclusive pensioner nearly 70 years ago.	Upheld

=== Series 5 (2021) ===
Broadcast date	Episode	Description	Outcome
28 June 2021	5.1	Jacoby	Unsafe
29 June 2021	5.2	Smith	Upheld
30 June 2021	5.3	Lee	Upheld
1 July 2021	5.4	Yarham	Unsafe
2 July 2021	5.5	Lefley	Upheld
5 July 2021	5.6	Fox	Unsafe
6 July 2021	5.7	McLachlan	Upheld
7 July 2021	5.8	Allen	Upheld
8 July 2021	5.9	Grime	Upheld
9 July 2021	5.10	Poff/Barrett	Unsafe

== Murder, Mystery and My Family: Case Closed? ==
In April 2019, five 45-minute episodes of the follow-up series Murder, Mystery and My Family: Case Closed? were broadcast on BBC One, revisiting cases previously covered in series 1 of the main programme. In August 2020, a second series of five 45-minute episodes was broadcast on BBC One, revisiting cases previously covered in series 2 and 3 of the main programme.

=== Series 1 (2019) ===
Broadcast	Episode	Description	Original episode	Outcome in original episode
8 April 2019	1.1	Barristers Jeremy Dein and Sasha Wass revisit their examination of the murder case against Edith Thompson and discover that Edith has finally been laid to rest.	1.5	Unsafe
9 April 2019	1.2	Barristers Sasha Wass and Jeremy Dein look back at their investigation of a murder case from the 1930s and discover that a Bryant family torn apart has finally been reunited.	1.1	Upheld
10 April 2019	1.3	Barristers Sasha and Jeremy look back at the questionable case against Alfred Moore. They find that Moore's daughter is now more determined than ever to clear her father's name.	1.3	Upheld
11 April 2019	1.4	Barristers Sasha and Jeremy revisit a seaside murder case from 1900 and catch up with the relative of the convicted man, who is now on the trail of a mysterious brother-in-law.	1.6	Upheld
12 April 2019	1.5	Barristers Jeremy and Sasha revisit a rural case of murder and moonlighting in Ireland in 1894 and discover that the convicted man's relatives are hoping for an official pardon.	1.10	Unsafe

=== Series 2 (2020) ===
Broadcast	Episode	Description	Original episode	Outcome in original episode
10 August 2020	2.1	Barristers Sasha Wass and Jeremy Dein revisit the case of a wealthy female tenant, poisoned by her landlord following a financial deal made shortly before her death in 1911.	3.9	Upheld
11 August 2020	2.2	The barristers look back at the investigation of their oldest case yet, the 1839 murder by drowning of a female passenger aboard a commercial narrow boat in Staffordshire.	3.1	Unsafe
12 August 2020	2.3	Top barristers Sasha Wass and Jeremy Dein revisit their investigation into the mysterious murder of a Yorkshire farm owner in 1933.	3.2	Upheld
13 August 2020	2.4	The barristers return to the case of a Sussex poultry farmer who buried the body of his fiancée under a chicken run in 1924 but claimed to be innocent of her murder.	3.3	Upheld
14 August 2020	2.5	The barristers revisit the savage murder of a pub landlady in a sleepy Oxfordshire hamlet in 1922, which led to the unlikely conviction of a 15-year-old local boy.	2.1	Unsafe

=== Series 3 (2021) ===
Broadcast	Episode	Description	Original episode	Outcome in original episode
12 July 2021	3.1	Devlin and Burns	1.2	Unsafe
13 July 2021	3.2	Stone	2.5	Upheld
14 July 2021	3.3	Major	2.10	Upheld
15 July 2021	3.4	Dickman	1.4	Not heard
16 July 2021	3.5	Chesham	2.8	Unsafe

=== Series 4 (2021) ===
Broadcast	Episode	Description	Original episode	Outcome in original episode
19 July 2021	4.1	Maybrick	4.1	Unsafe
20 July 2021	4.2	Waddingham	3.5	Upheld
21 July 2021	4.3	Brown	4.9	Upheld
22 July 2021	4.4	Staunton	4.6	Unsafe
23 July 2021	4.5	Lowson	4.4	Upheld

== See also ==
- Second Verdict
- Julian Fellowes Investigates: A Most Mysterious Murder
- History of English criminal law

== Bibliography ==
- Farrington, Karen (October 2019). Murder, Mystery and My Family: A True-Crime Casebook from the Hit BBC Series. London: BBC Books. ISBN 9781785944772.
