= Styllou Christofi =

Greek Cypriot murderer

Coordinates: 51°18′13.67″N 0°37′33.33″W

Styllou Christofi

Styllou Pantopiou Christofi (Greek: Στυλλού Χριστοφή; 1900 – 15 December 1954) was a Greek Cypriot woman hanged in Britain for murdering her daughter-in-law. She was the penultimate woman to be executed in Britain, followed in 1955 by Ruth Ellis.

== Background ==
Styllou Christofi was born in Cyprus, then a British protectorate, to a Cypriot family. She grew up in a small, isolated village and received no formal education. According to British historian and crime author Philip Jones, the insularity of Cypriot villages such as the one Christofi was from meant that personal disagreements and arguments among residents were seen as local matters, and could lead to "levels of behaviour or resolutions that the wider world might consider improper or unreasonable, but which to the village itself were seen as entirely acceptable". Christofi married and gave birth to a son, Stavros. Her husband was one of the poorest men in the village, and the family's income came from a tiny olive grove they owned.

In 1925, Christofi was arrested and charged with murdering her mother-in-law by ramming a lighted torch down her throat, after the two women had extensively bickered. According to varying accounts, she was either found not guilty, or the court found that she had been provoked to such an extent that a criminal penalty was inappropriate.

Her son Stavros later left the village for Nicosia to work as a waiter. In 1941, after saving up enough money, he moved to Britain, settled in London, and found a job as a wine waiter at Café de Paris, a prestigious nightclub on London's West End. He married Hella Bleicher, a German-born fashion model, and the couple had three children.

In 1953, Christofi came to London to reunite with Stavros, whom she had not seen for 12 years. She had trouble adapting to her new lifestyle, and began extensively arguing with her daughter-in-law. In particular, Christofi resented the fact that her grandchildren were being raised as typical English children with no regard for their Cypriot heritage. She would frequently criticise Hella's parenting and fly into tantrums. In July 1954, Stavros and Hella agreed that Christofi needed to leave. Hella planned to take the children on a visit to Germany, during which Stavros would try to persuade his mother to return to Cyprus. Christofi, who probably became aware of the plan, soon resolved to murder Hella so she could raise the children her own way.

== Murder ==
On the evening of 29 July 1954, after Stavros had left for work and the children had been put to bed, Christofi went to the kitchen, where Hella was going about her chores, and knocked her unconscious with a blow to the back of the head with an ash pan from the boiler. She then strangled Hella to death with a scarf, removed the wedding ring from her finger, dragged the body into the back garden and attempted to cremate it by pouring paraffin over it and setting it on fire. The flames caught the attention of next-door neighbour John Young, who was passing by the house walking his dog. He saw Christofi burning Hella's body over the fence. However, he believed that the article being burnt was a mannequin, and seeing that Christofi was attending to the fire, believed there was no cause for alarm.

The fire soon got out of control, and Christofi, who spoke little English, ran into the street to raise the alarm. She eventually found help from a couple in a car parked outside a railway station, to whom she explained "Please come. Fire burning. Children sleeping". When they arrived, they called the fire brigade, who summoned the police after finding Hella's body in the garden.

Police opened an investigation, and found incriminating evidence against Christofi. Hella's body was found to show signs of strangulation, and hastily cleaned bloodstains and paraffin-soaked rags and newspapers were discovered on the kitchen floor. Furthermore, John Young, the neighbour who had witnessed Christofi setting the fire over what he had believed was a mannequin, soon came forward and told police what he had seen. Hella's wedding ring was also found to have been removed: it was later found in Christofi's bedroom, and Christofi could offer no reasonable explanation.

== Trial and execution ==
Christofi was arrested on suspicion of murder. During her interrogation, she offered an explanation: "I wake up, smell burning, go downstairs. Hella burning. Throw water, touch her face. Not move. Run out, get help." Christofi was charged and remanded to HM Prison Holloway soon afterwards. Her trial began at the Old Bailey on 25 October 1954. Her counsel offered a defence of insanity but the jury rejected it. Christofi was found guilty and sentenced to death on 28 October 1954 by Mr Justice Devlin. There was a limited campaign for clemency, but to no avail. Her executioner, Albert Pierrepoint claimed in his autobiography, Executioner: Pierrepoint, that Christofi failed to attract much media attention or sympathy because, unlike the pretty Ruth Ellis, she was not glamorous. A "blonde night-club hostess" was much more alluring than "a grey-haired and bewildered grandmother who spoke no English." While in the condemned cell, she requested that a Greek Christian Orthodox cross be put on the wall of the execution chamber, which was granted. It remained there until the room was dismantled in 1967. She was also shunned by her son Stavros, who did not make any requests for clemency, and later said "I cannot find it in my heart to forgive my mother. The word 'mother' has become a mockery to me".

Christofi was hanged at Holloway Prison by Albert Pierrepoint and assistant Harry Allen on the morning of 15 December 1954. Pathologist Francis Camps examined the body.

== Burial ==
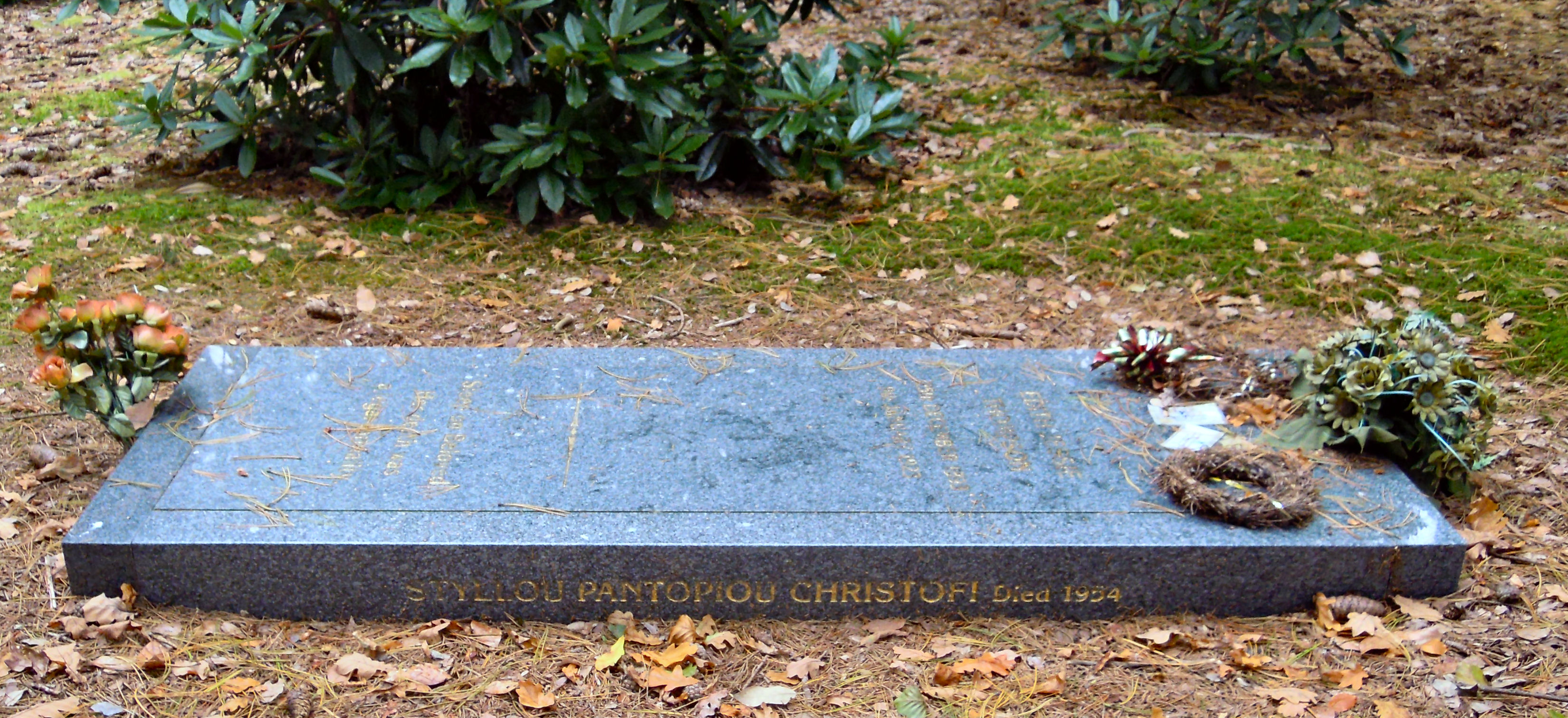
Christofi's grave in Brookwood Cemetery

The body of Christofi was buried in an unmarked grave within the walls of Holloway Prison, as was customary. In 1971, the prison underwent an extensive programme of rebuilding, during which the bodies of all the executed women were exhumed. With the exception of Ruth Ellis, the remains of the four other women executed at Holloway (i.e., Styllou Christofi, Edith Thompson, Amelia Sach and Annie Walters) were subsequently reburied in a single grave (plot 117) at Brookwood Cemetery in Surrey. The remains of Thompson were exhumed in 2018 and laid to rest in the grave of her mother and father in the City of London Cemetery.

The new grave (in plot 117) remained unmarked for over twenty years. It was acquired in the 1980s by René Weis and Audrey Russell, who had interviewed Avis Graydon (Edith Thompson's surviving sister) at length in the 1970s. On 13 November 1993, a grey granite memorial was placed on plot 117 and dedicated to the memory of the four women buried there. The grave and plot were formally consecrated by the Reverend Barry Arscott of St. Barnabas, Manor Park, the church in which Edith Thompson was married in January 1916. Edith Thompson's details appear prominently on the face of the tombstone, together with her epitaph: "Sleep on Beloved. Her death was a legal formality". The names of the other three women are inscribed around the edges of the tombstone.

== In popular culture ==
Christofi was featured in episode 3, season 11, of Deadly Women.

The case was re-examined in 2019 in episode 2 of series 2 of BBC One's Murder, Mystery and My Family. In it barristers Jeremy Dein and Sasha Wass re-investigated the case on behalf of her grandson, Pantopios (Toby) Christofis a.k.a. Tobias Christopher, hoping to prove her innocence. Although question marks were raised over Christofi's execution and mental health, insufficient evidence was uncovered to suggest her conviction should be overturned.

== See also ==
- Executed English Women

== Footnotes ==
=== General references ===
- Eddleston, John J. (2004): The Encyclopaedia of Executions: The Stories Behind Every Execution in Twentieth Century Britain, John Blake, ISBN 1-84454-058-8 ISBN 978-1844540587, page 861.
- Panikos Panayi and Andrekos Varnava, “‘The ‘Bewildered’ Peasant: Family, Migration and Murder in the Greek Cypriot Community in London”, Historical Research, 95(267), February 2022, 82–103. https://academic.oup.com/histres/article-abstract/95/267/82/6423258
