= Douglas Wass =

British civil servant (1923–2017)

Sir Douglas William Gretton Wass GCB (15 April 1923 – 4 January 2017) was a British civil servant who served as Permanent Secretary to HM Treasury from 1974 to 1983.

Wass was born in Wallasey, Merseyside the son of Arthur, a customs official and his wife, Elsie. He attended the independent Nottingham High School winning a maths scholarship to St John's College, Cambridge, graduating with a double first. During the second world war he worked in advanced weapons research in the Royal Navy, joining the Treasury in 1946.

Wass was Permanent Secretary to HM Treasury from 1974 to 1983 and served as joint head of the civil service following the retirement of Sir Ian Bancroft in 1981 until his own retirement.

He was appointed a Companion of the Order of the Bath (CB) in 1971, elevated to Knight Commander (KCB) in 1975 and further elevated to Knight Grand Cross (GCB) in 1980. In 1985, he was awarded an Honorary Degree (Doctor of Letters) by the University of Bath.

In 1983, Sir Douglas presented the annual BBC Reith Lectures. In a series of six lectures titled Government and the Governed, he examined the role and responsibilities of government.

Wass died on 4 January 2017 at the age of 93 and was survived by his wife Milica (nee Pavičič) whom he married in 1954, and his daughter Sasha Wass KC and his son Andrew and four grandchildren.

Government offices
Preceded by Sir Douglas Allen	Permanent Secretary, HM Treasury; 1974–1983	Succeeded by Sir Peter Middleton
Preceded by Sir Ian Bancroft	Head of the Home Civil Service; 1981–1983; With: Sir Robert Armstrong	Succeeded by Sir Robert Armstrong
