= Guantánamo: America's War on Human Rights =

2004 book by David Rose

- Cover of the first edition
- Author: David Rose
- Language: English
- Subjects: Human rights, war on terror
- Published: London
- Publisher: Faber & Faber
- Publication date: 2004
- Publication place: United Kingdom
- Media type: Print (paperback)
- Pages: 168
- ISBN: 0571226701
- Dewey Decimal: 973.931

Guantánamo: America's War on Human Rights is a 2004 book by British investigative journalist and author David Rose.

== Synopsis ==
The book examines the detention of prisoners at the military prison in American-occupied Guantánamo Bay, Cuba. The author visits the camp and speaks to guards, officials and medical staff as well as released prisoners. The book reveals serious violations of human rights, including physical brutality, isolation and harassment.

== Reception ==
In The New Zealand Herald John Freeman reviewed the book positively, writing 'Rose does a good job of making this faraway legal black hole come to life.' Amnesty International listed the book as a useful resource.
