= Murder of Harriet Staunton =

1877 death in Penge, London, England

Harriet Staunton
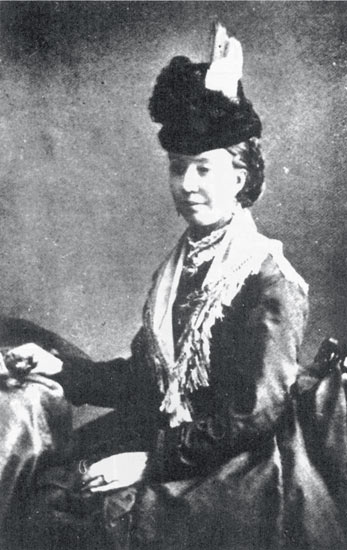
- Harriet Richardson at the time of her engagement to Louis Staunton
- Born: Harriet Richardson; 1841; Essex
- Died: 13 April 1877 (aged 35–36); Penge
- Cause of death: Starvation and neglect
- Known for: Murder victim

The murder of Harriet Staunton took place in the London suburb of Penge in April 1877. Harriet Staunton (née Richardson) died in a Penge lodging house on 13 April, five days after her one-year-old child, Thomas Staunton, died of malnutrition at Guy's Hospital. In September of the same year, Harriet's husband Louis Staunton was convicted of wilful murder at the Old Bailey together with his partner Alice Rhodes, his brother Patrick Staunton and Patrick's wife Elizabeth. All four were sentenced to death by hanging but the sentences were later commuted to terms of imprisonment after doubts were raised concerning the medical evidence and the impartiality of the presiding judge.

== Background ==
Harriet Richardson's father was a clergyman from Essex who died when his daughter was twelve. She later received £5,000 from the will of a great-aunt. She was reportedly of limited mental capacity and appears to have had learning disabilities.

Louis (or Lewis) Staunton (born c. 1851) was an auctioneer's clerk from Streatham. At the time of his first encounter with Harriet he was twenty-three years old and involved in a relationship with a fifteen-year-old girl named Alice Rhodes. Staunton's younger brother, Patrick, was married to Alice Rhodes' older sister Elizabeth.

Louis Staunton met Harriet through Alice Rhodes' stepfather Thomas Hinksman, a relative of the Richardson family. After a brief courtship, the couple were engaged to be married. Harriet's mother Mrs Butterfield (she had remarried) was strongly opposed to the marriage and made an unsuccessful attempt to have her daughter declared a lunatic and placed under the protection of the Court of Chancery. The couple were married at Clapham in June 1875. Mrs Butterfield visited her newly married daughter at her home in Brixton, but then received a letter apparently written by her daughter saying that she was not to visit the couple in future.

== Crime ==
In March 1876 Harriet gave birth to a son who was named Thomas Henry. At about the same time Louis bought a house called Little Grays near Cudham in Kent. In August, Louis moved into Little Grays where he lived with Alice Rhodes while Harriet and Thomas were sent to live at Frith Cottage, one mile away, with Patrick and Elizabeth. Mother and child were confined to a small upstairs room with no curtains, washing facilities or proper furniture. She was dissuaded from leaving the room by threats of violence from Patrick Staunton. Mrs Butterfield made efforts to contact her daughter, but when she travelled to Little Grays she was turned away by Louis. In October, Harriet attempted to escape from the cottage but was forcibly restrained and assaulted by Patrick.

The infant Thomas Staunton became gravely ill in early 1877 and was taken by Patrick and Elizabeth Staunton to Guy's Hospital in London on 8 April. The child died later that day: he was severely malnourished, and had a bruise on his cheek suggesting physical abuse. On 12 April, Harriet was removed from the cottage and sent to a lodging house at 34 Forbes Road (now Mosslea Road), Penge. On her arrival, she was described as looking "more like a corpse than a living woman" and she died the following day. The death certificate gave her cause of death as "cerebral disease" or "apoplexy". Harriet was buried at St. George's Church, in nearby Beckenham, Kent.

== Investigation ==
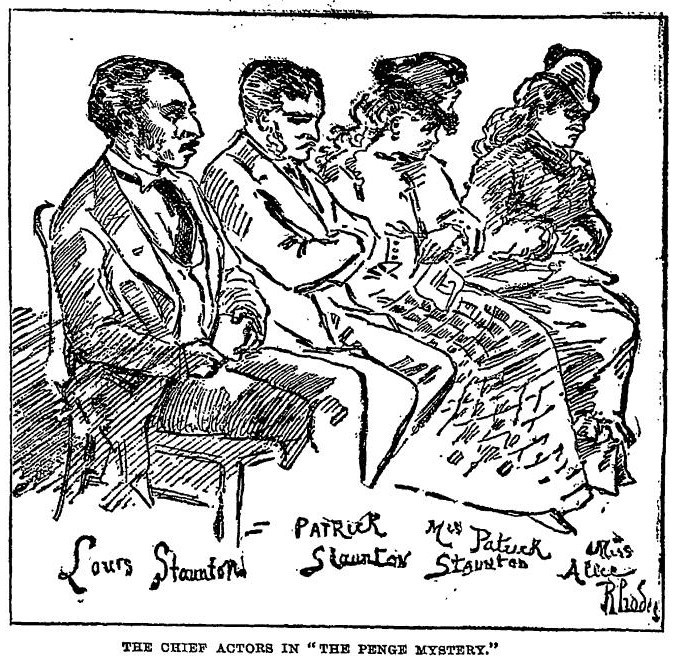
The accused at the trial l-to-r Louis Staunton, Patrick Staunton, Elizabeth Staunton, Alice Rhodes

Suspicions about Harriet's death were originally raised by her brother-in-law Louis Casabianca, who encountered Louis Staunton in a post office where the latter was attempting to get information about recording his wife's death. Casabianca went to the police and an inquest was held. Harriet's body was found to be filthy and severely malnourished: her hair was matted and infested with lice. The cause of death was now recorded as "starvation and neglect". At the time of her death she weighed five stone four pounds (34 kg; 74 lb).

Louis Staunton, Patrick Staunton, Elizabeth Staunton and Alice Rhodes were arrested and charged with murder. The case attracted great public attention: models of the four accused were soon on display at Madame Tussauds.

== Trial and review ==
In September, the Stauntons and Alice Rhodes were tried for the murder of Harriet Staunton at the Old Bailey with judge Henry Hawkins presiding. The case attracted great interest, with fashionable ladies scrutinising the accused through opera glasses and refreshing themselves with champagne. The defence, led by Edward Clarke, claimed that Harriet's malnourishment was due to alcoholism which led to her refusing to eat. Medical testimony was also presented which stated that the victim had died from meningitis and tuberculosis. The jury returned a verdict of guilty on all four defendants, who were sentenced to death by hanging. As the verdict was read, Patrick Staunton "twitched convulsively" while Louis Staunton "stared fixedly" and appeared "completely dazed". Despite the cold and foggy weather, a large crowd had gathered around the court building and cheered the verdict. In passing sentence, Hawkins said that the crime was one of the most "black and hideous" on record and commented on the incredible "barbarity" and cruelty involved.

Following the verdict a letter was published in The Lancet, signed by seven hundred physicians protesting about the way that expert medical evidence had been ignored. It was also widely thought that Hawkins had exhibited bias against the accused. A campaign against the verdict was led by the novelist Charles Reade and the case was reviewed by the Home Secretary R. A. Cross. Alice Rhodes was pardoned and released immediately, while the sentences of the other three were commuted to life imprisonment. Patrick Staunton died in prison, but Elizabeth was released in 1883. Louis Staunton was released in 1897, still protesting his innocence, and emigrated to Australia.

== Popular culture ==
In 1934 Elizabeth Jenkins published the novel Harriet based on the case, supporting the view of the presiding judge, Hawkins. The novel won the Femina - Vie Heureuse Prize in 1935, beating Evelyn Waugh's A Handful of Dust, and was republished in 2012 by Persephone Books.

The case featured as an episode of the 1970 six-part ITV series Wicked Women with Alice Rhodes played by Joanna Dunham.

The case was re-examined in the BBC One programme Murder, Mystery and My Family (series 4, episode 6). and revisited in Murder, Mystery and My Family: Case Closed? (series 4, episode 4).
