= David Rose (journalist) =

British journalist

- Born: 21 July 1959 (age 67); London, England, United Kingdom
- Education: Magdalen College, Oxford (BA)
- Occupations: Author, investigative journalist

David Rose (born 21 July 1959) is a British author and investigative journalist. He is a contributing editor with Vanity Fair and a special investigations writer for The Mail on Sunday. His interests include human rights, miscarriages of justice, the death penalty, racism, the war on terror, politics, and climate change denial. He is the author of six non-fiction books and a novel, Taking Morgan, a thriller set in Washington, Oxford, Tel Aviv and Gaza, published by Quartet in 2014. He was named News Reporter of the Year in the Society of Editors British Press Awards for 2015.

Rose's journalism on climate has been criticised by climate scientists and environmentalists for an over-reliance on unsound and unscientific sources and has been censured by the Independent Press Standards Organisation (IPSO). Rose admitted to the dissemination of incorrect information from unreliable sources in the run up to the Iraq war.

== Early life and career ==
Rose was born in London on 21 July 1959. He read history at Magdalen College, Oxford, and earned a first class honours degree in 1981.

Rose's first job was as a reporter with the London magazine Time Out, 1981–4. He then worked successively on the staffs on The Guardian, The Observer and BBC current affairs television.

In 2002 he became a Vanity Fair contributing editor, and in 2008 a special investigations writer for The Mail on Sunday. He is a winner of the Royal Institute of International Affairs David Watt Memorial Prize. In 2013, a poll of investigative reporters organised by the UK Press Gazette named him among the top ten practitioners of his trade.

After the trial of the three men convicted of murdering Police Constable Keith Blakelock in the Broadwater Farm riot in 1987, he wrote many articles challenging their convictions and life sentences, working closely with their lawyers. This led to their successful appeals in 1991, and became the subject of his book A Climate of Fear (1992). Rose has repeatedly drawn attention to the dangers of wrongful convictions for historic sex abuse, beginning with the BBC Panorama programme which he reported and wrote, In the Name of the Children (2000).

His longest-running campaign is that on behalf of Georgia death row prisoner Carlton Gary, convicted as the Columbus "stocking strangler", supposedly the African-American who raped and murdered seven white women 1977–78. His book, The Big Eddy Club (2007), focuses on this case and its direct links with the era of lynching and Jim Crow racism.

In 2010 Rose admitted to the dissemination of incorrect information from unreliable sources in his covering of the Iraq war in 2002 and 2003.

=== Defamation findings ===
In 2016 Rose wrote a false and defamatory article against Sasha Wass QC; the contents of which was later contested in court, with Rose and the Mail on Sunday receiving a substantive libel penalty and vituperation by the court judge.

A story by David Rose in the Mail on Sunday in May 2017 in which he falsely accused a British-born Pakistani taxi licensing officer Wajed Iqbal as participating in a child sex ring has resulted in a substantial out of court settlement by Associated Newspapers Limited (ANL).

On 17 November 2019, Rose wrote an article about Maria Carroll, then a Labour Party prospective parliamentary candidate, alleging that she assisted antisemites and Holocaust deniers. This article appeared in the Mail on Sunday. Following a complaint to IPSO that the article was factually incorrect, the article was retracted. The newspaper paid damages to Carroll and on 10 January 2021 issued a correction apologising to her.

=== Climate change denial ===
Rose's journalism on climate has been criticised by climate scientists and environmentalists for an over-reliance on unsound and unscientific sources, cherry-picking and manufactured data. Rose has also been criticised repeatedly by the United Kingdom's national weather service, the Met Office.

The Mail on Sunday was criticised by Independent Press Standards Organisation (IPSO) in September 2017 for the February publication of an article by Rose which falsely suggested information from the American National Oceanic and Atmospheric Administration (NOAA) had been used to overstress the extent of global warming. Not all of the other points in the complaint against Rose's article were upheld.

== Private life ==
Rose is married with four children and lives in Oxford. His interests include mountaineering, rock-climbing and caving. He has taken part in expeditions with Oxford University Cave Club, which have explored the very deep caves of the Picos de Europa mountains in northern Spain, including the Pozu del Xitu, 1,264 metres deep. These explorations were the subject of his first book, Beneath the Mountains.

== Books by Rose ==
- 1987 – Beneath The Mountains (with Richard Gregson)
- 1992 – A Climate of Fear: Blakelock Murder and the Tottenham Three
- 1996 – In the Name of the Law: The Collapse of Criminal Justice
- 1999 – Regions of the Heart: The Triumph and Tragedy of Alison Hargreaves (with Ed Douglas)
- 2004 – Guantanamo: America's War on Human Rights
- 2007 – The Big Eddy Club: The Stocking Stranglings and Southern Justice (published in UK under the title Violation)
- 2014 – Taking Morgan
