= Amelia Sach and Annie Walters =

British murderers

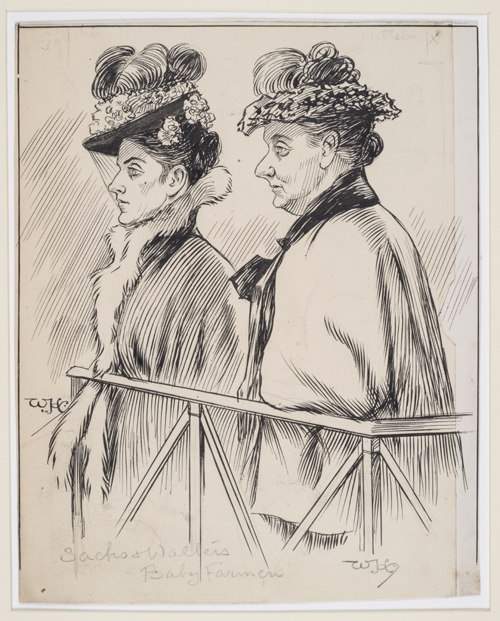
Amelia Sach and Annie Walters in the dock in 1903

Amelia Sach (1873 – 3 February 1903) and Annie Walters (1869 – 3 February 1903) were two British murderers better known as the Finchley baby farmers.

== Background ==
Little is known about Annie Walters, but Amelia Sach's background is well-documented: Sach was baptised Frances Amelia Thorne in Hampreston, Dorset on 5 May 1867. She was the fourth child of ten and had three sisters. She married a builder called Jeffrey Sach in 1896. Sach was active long before she engaged Walters. By 1902, she was working from 'Claymore House', a semi-detached, red-brick villa in East Finchley, North London. Sach was a qualified midwife.

Sach was herself a mother; the England and Wales census of 1901 shows that a daughter named Lilian was born to her in Clapham. She lied about her age – she was 32, not 29. Walters' background is unknown, but she had been married. She seems to have had a drinking problem and she would periodically advertise herself as a sick nurse. On her arrest, she was determined to be "feeble", that is to say, feeble-minded.

There is a small possibility that the pair may have been involved in an earlier homicide that resulted in another woman being executed. In 1899, Louise Masset was tried for the murder of her young son Manfred, whose body was found in the ladies' lavatory at Dalston Junction railway station. Circumstantial evidence suggested that Louise was the murderer, and the killing was to be rid of a supposed encumbrance due to her wanting to marry a man named Lucas. However, in her claims of innocence, Louise said she had taken Manfred out of the care of one woman to give him to two ladies she met who had an establishment for the care of growing children. The police claimed they made some effort to look for the two women, but the extent of their investigation is unknown. In any event, Louise Masset was tried and convicted of the murder and, despite a petition for mercy, was executed on 9 January 1900.

== Crimes ==
Amelia Sach operated a "lying-in" home in Stanley Road and later at Claymore House in Hertford Road (both in East Finchley), London. Around 1900, she began to advertise that babies "could be left" and took money for adoptions. The clients, judging from the witness accounts, were mostly servants from local houses who had become pregnant and who had employers who were keen for the matter to be resolved discreetly. There was a charge for lying-in and another for adoption, a "present" to future parents of between £25 and £30.

Annie Walters would collect the baby after it was born, then murder it with a poisonous mixture of chlorodyne (a medicine containing morphine).

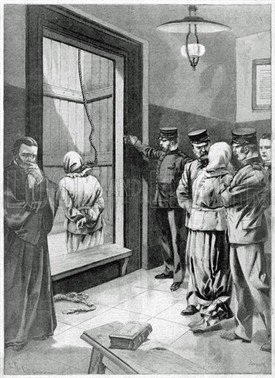
The double execution of Sach and Walters at Holloway Prison

They were caught after Walters raised the suspicions of her landlord in Islington who was a police officer. An unknown number of babies were murdered this way, although the figure is considered to be in excess of a dozen. During their trial at the Old Bailey, the number of baby clothes found at Claymore House was used as evidence to indicate the sheer scale of their crimes. A local campaign to have their sentences commuted to life failed, and they became the first women to be hanged at Holloway Prison, on 3 February 1903 by William Billington, in what was the only double-hanging of women to be carried out in modern times.

== Aftermath ==
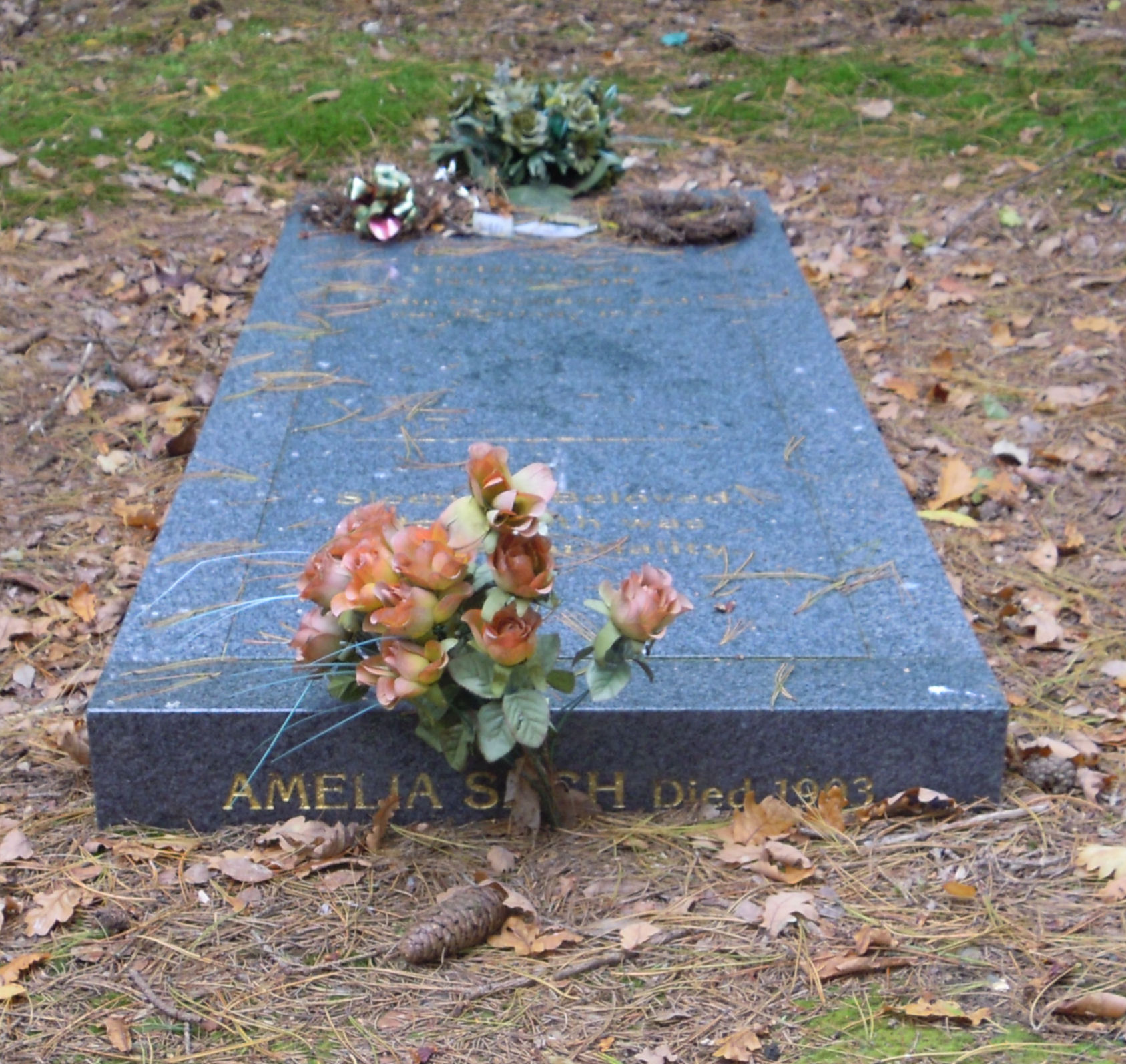
Tombstone showing the name of Amelia Sach

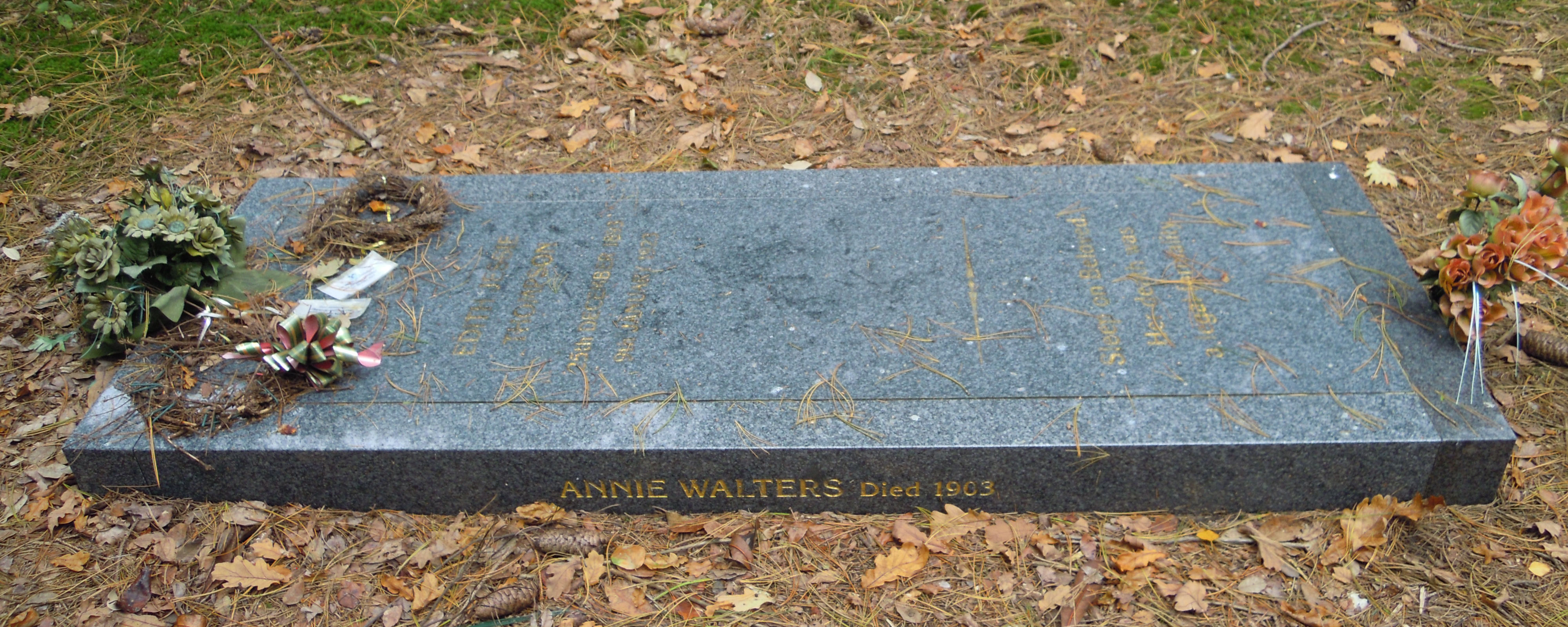
Tombstone showing the name of Annie Walters

The bodies of Sach and Walters were buried in unmarked graves within the walls of Holloway Prison, as was customary. In 1971, the prison underwent an extensive programme of rebuilding, during which the remains of all the women executed at Holloway were exhumed. With the exception of Ruth Ellis, the remains of the four other women executed at Holloway (i.e. Styllou Christofi, Edith Thompson, Sach, and Walters) were subsequently reburied in a single grave (plot 117) at Brookwood Cemetery. The grave is marked with a horizontally laid grey granite tombstone, and the names of all the occupants are engraved on it. The precise location of Sach and Walters' grave within Brookwood Cemetery is 51°18′13.67″N 0°37′33.33″W.

== In popular culture ==
The plot of Nicola Upson's novel Two for Sorrow (2010, Faber & Faber, London; Harper, New York) revolves around the aftermath of the Finchley Baby Farming affair. Both Sach and Walters appear as characters.

== See also ==
- List of serial killers in the United Kingdom

== Books ==
- Jesse, F. Tennyson Murder and Its Motives (Garden City, New York, Doubleday & Company—Dolphin Books, 1924, 1958, 1965), 240p. The book's introduction has a section on the "Baby Farming" murder cases, including 3 pages on Sachs and Walters—p. 32–34 in this edition.
