= The Paying Guests =

2014 novel by Sarah Waters

- First edition
- Author: Sarah Waters
- Cover artist: Duncan Spilling
- Language: English
- Publisher: Virago Press
- Publication date: August 2014
- Publication place: United Kingdom
- Media type: Print
- Pages: 576
- ISBN: 0-349-00436-6

The Paying Guests is a 2014 novel by Welsh author Sarah Waters. It was shortlisted for the Baileys Women's Prize for Fiction and named "Fiction Book of the Year" by The Sunday Times who said that "this novel magnificently confirms Sarah Waters' status as an unsurpassed fictional recorder of vanished eras and hidden lives."

== Plot introduction ==
The book is set in 1922 in Camberwell, south London, where spinster Frances lives with her genteel mother Mrs Wray and mourns the death of her brothers in the Great War. Her father has died leaving considerable debts and they are obliged to take in lodgers: Lilian and Leonard Barber of the "clerk class". The guests bring with them colour, fun and music but also stir dangerous desires in Frances.

== Inspiration ==
Waters wrote: "Having set my two previous books in the 1940s I thought I'd venture back a couple of decades, and in the pursuit of information about British domestic life in the interwar years I began looking at murder cases; I went to them purely, really, for the sake of their incidental detail. But two cases caught my attention, that of Edith Thompson and Frederick Bywaters in 1922, and of Alma Rattenbury and Percy Stoner in 1935 – both cases involving a husband, his wife and her young male lover, in which a moment's reckless violence had fatal consequences for almost everyone concerned." In an interview with The New York Times, Waters said: "I thought how interesting it would be if the lover was a female lover." Waters continues: "The impact of the First World War was to shake things up enormously, loosening up old mores, fashions and behaviours. The early '20s were like the waist of an hourglass. Lots of things were hurtling toward it and squeezing through it and then hurtling out the other side."

Waters stated in 2015: "I wanted The Paying Guests, above all, to achieve two things: to evoke, convincingly, the intricate fabric of interwar domesticity; and then to set that fabric thrumming with desire, transgression and moral crisis."

== Reception ==
- Lucy Daniel in The Telegraph is full of praise: "One of the things that brings her characters to life is that Waters is very good at describing physical contact, gestures, deeds. People recede from each other even as they become more physically entangled. Even living at such close quarters, her characters remain a mystery to one another. Finally the novel seems a discussion of the very nature of intimacy. As charming as the period details are, it would be easy to fall into quaintness, with appealing costumes, Edwardian parlance, and slipping into the pantry for a quick fondle. But Waters saves it by the eerie power of her writing."
- Hannah Britt in The Daily Express writes: "A lengthy novel, The Paying Guests takes a while to really get going and the first third could arguably be much shorter. However, when the drama kicks in, it’s worth the wait...The 1920s setting is a joy to read. One of Waters’ strengths is the apparent ease with which she conjures up a sense of period.". "As the narrative unfolds into a tense and dramatic court case, their plight tugs on the heart-strings. The novel’s conclusion when it arrives is satisfying, if slightly predictable and the loose ends are nicely tied. A great rainy day read, The Paying Guests is raunchy, romantic and thoroughly entertaining. Another triumph for Sarah Waters, it is unputdownable."
- Rachel Cusk in The Guardian is however critical: "As Frances and Mrs Barber progress towards an affair. Waters's plain-spoken description of this relationship immediately begins to undermine the novel's integrity as a period piece: the sexual perspective is designed for the modern reader, and starts to resemble a costume drama. Its pastiche propriety and faux-Edwardian prose (people are forever "colouring" and "crimsoning" and "putting themselves tidy") become irritants; and the novel's descent into melodrama as a murder is committed – and the inspector called – turns this engaging literary endeavour into a tiresome soap opera."
- Arifa Akbar in The Independent also has some reservations, concluding: "Waters's historical fictions have shown her to be adept at tight, intricate plotting, most dazzlingly illustrated in the breathtaking plot twist in Fingersmith. If this is Waters's early 20th-century crime novel, it does not match the imagination of this earlier Victorian crime novel. Perhaps Waters does not want to put on a fireworks display of plot surprises. She does give us a poignant love story which symbolically sees in the death of the old order, the death of the old-fashioned husband and maybe the birth of an era of love without secrets. Yet we find ourselves wishing for a few more fireworks all the same."
