= Sasha Wass =

British lawyer

- Born: 19 February 1958
- Alma mater: University of Liverpool
- Occupation: Lawyer, judge
- Position held: King's Counsel (2000–), recorder (2000–)

Sasha Wass KC (born 19 February 1958) is a barrister and fee-paid judge.

Her father, Sir Douglas Wass, was a senior civil servant. She obtained a Bachelor of Laws from the University of Liverpool and has been practising criminal law at the Bar for over four decades, having been called in 1981 and taking silk in 2000. She was appointed Recorder of the Crown Court in 1997, and a Recorder of the Central Criminal Court in 2008. She is part of the Chambers of Simon Denison KC, 6KBW.

Wass has more recently participated in BBCs Murder, Mystery and My Family, reviewing historical verdicts in criminal trials from a prosecutor's perspective, testing the evidence against today's conviction standards and submitting findings to a retired judge. Whilst the trial reviews cannot reverse past verdicts, they can help families to come to terms with the potential miscarriages of justice many decades ago.

As a senior criminal barrister and formerly a QC she had helped to prosecute high profile cases, ranging from defending killer Rosemary West through to and including Rolf Harris and she successfully advised the disgraced financier Roger Levitt on his plea bargain deal with the SFO; she was credited with saving Levitt from serving jail time by him agreeing to community service orders.

Wass successfully fought and won a full apology arising from her 2018 libel action against the Mail on Sunday for an article by David Rose containing profoundly false accusations that they had published about her in 2016.

In 2020, Wass successfully defended her corporate client, News Group Newspapers, publishers of the U.K. Sun, against a libel action brought by U.S. actor Johnny Depp. Depp gave five days of testimony in London's High Court and was cross-examined by Wass, who sought to persuade the Court that Depp had abused his ex-wife Amber Heard, during their relationship. The Sun as publisher, had claimed Depp was a "wife-beater" in the article by then Executive Editor, Dan Wootton.

In 2024, Wass lost her case for Tommy Robinson for contempt of court.

In February 2025, she successfully defended television antiques expert Charles Hanson against accusations of domestic abuse. That same year she represented Gavin Plumb in his unsuccessful appeal against his sentence for plotting to murder Holly Willoughby.
