= John Dickman =

British murderer (1864–1910)

- Born: 17 May 1864
- Died: 10 August 1910 (aged 46); Newcastle upon Tyne, Tyne and Wear, England
- Status: Executed by hanging
- Conviction: Capital murder
- Penalty: Death

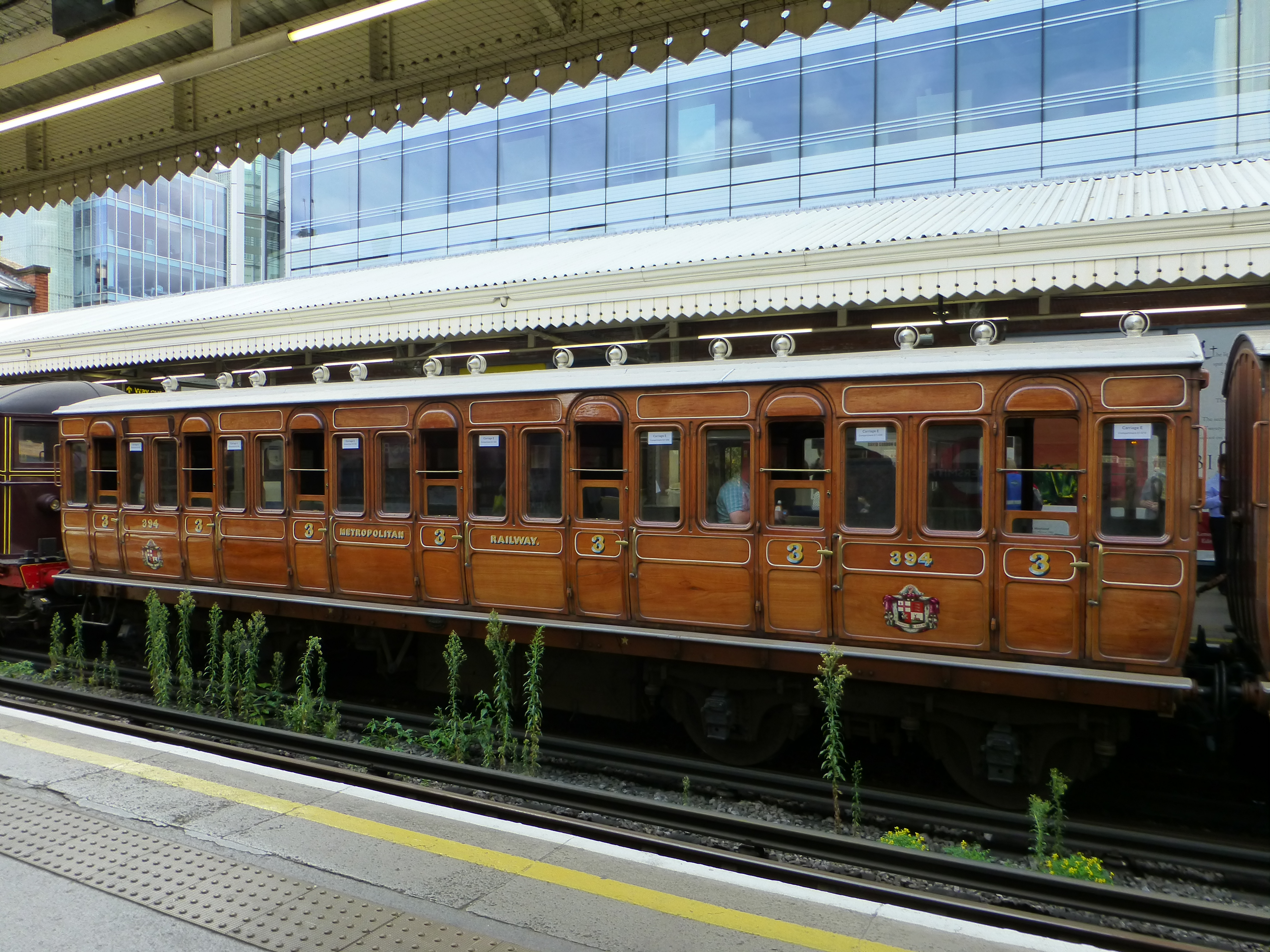
Full-width compartment carriage with no aisle and no corridor built 1900, similar to the one in which John Nisbet was murdered

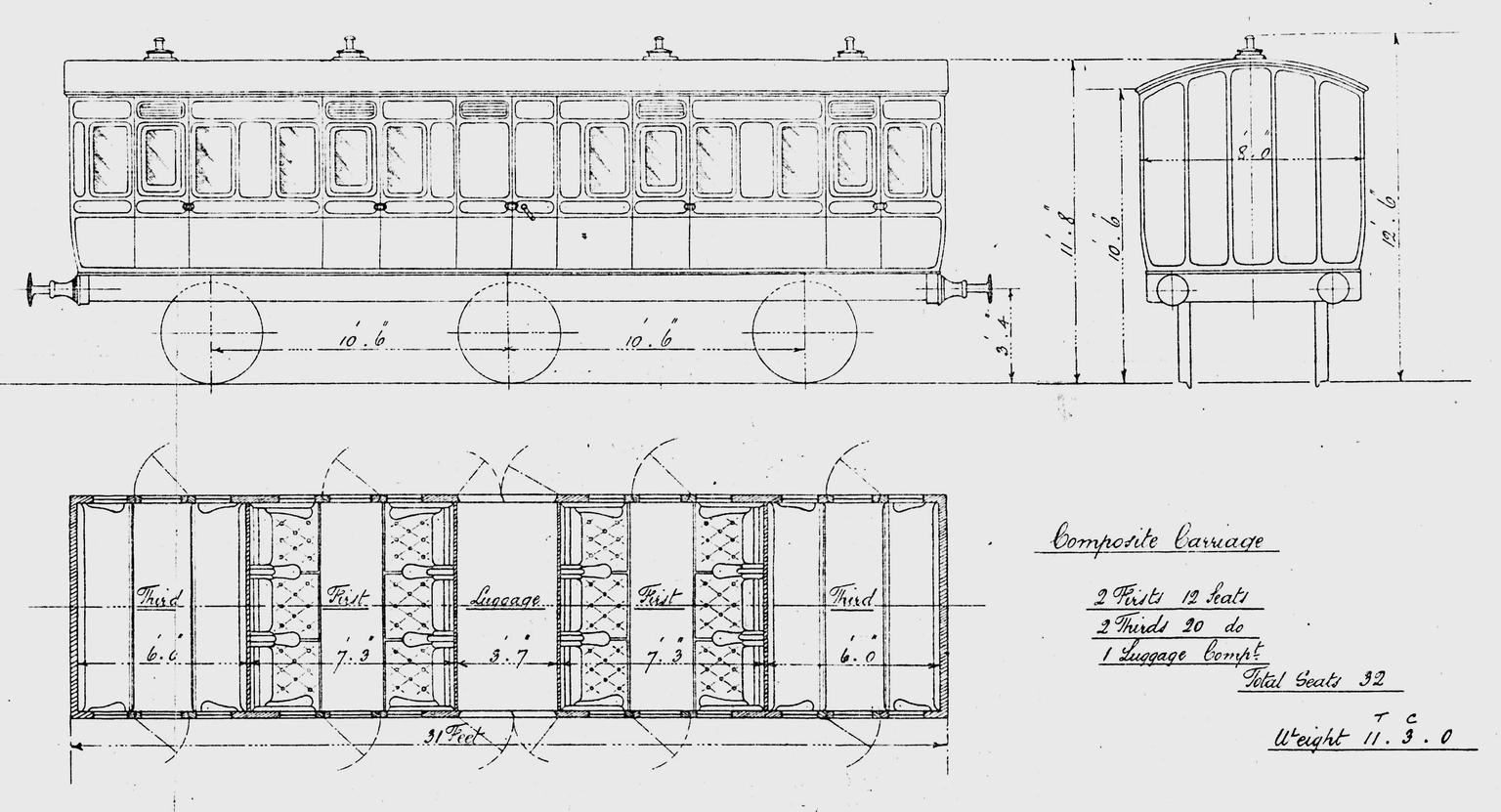
Interior layout diagram of a compartment coach with no corridor

John Alexander Dickman (17 May 1864 – 10 August 1910) was an Englishman hanged for murder.

== Description ==
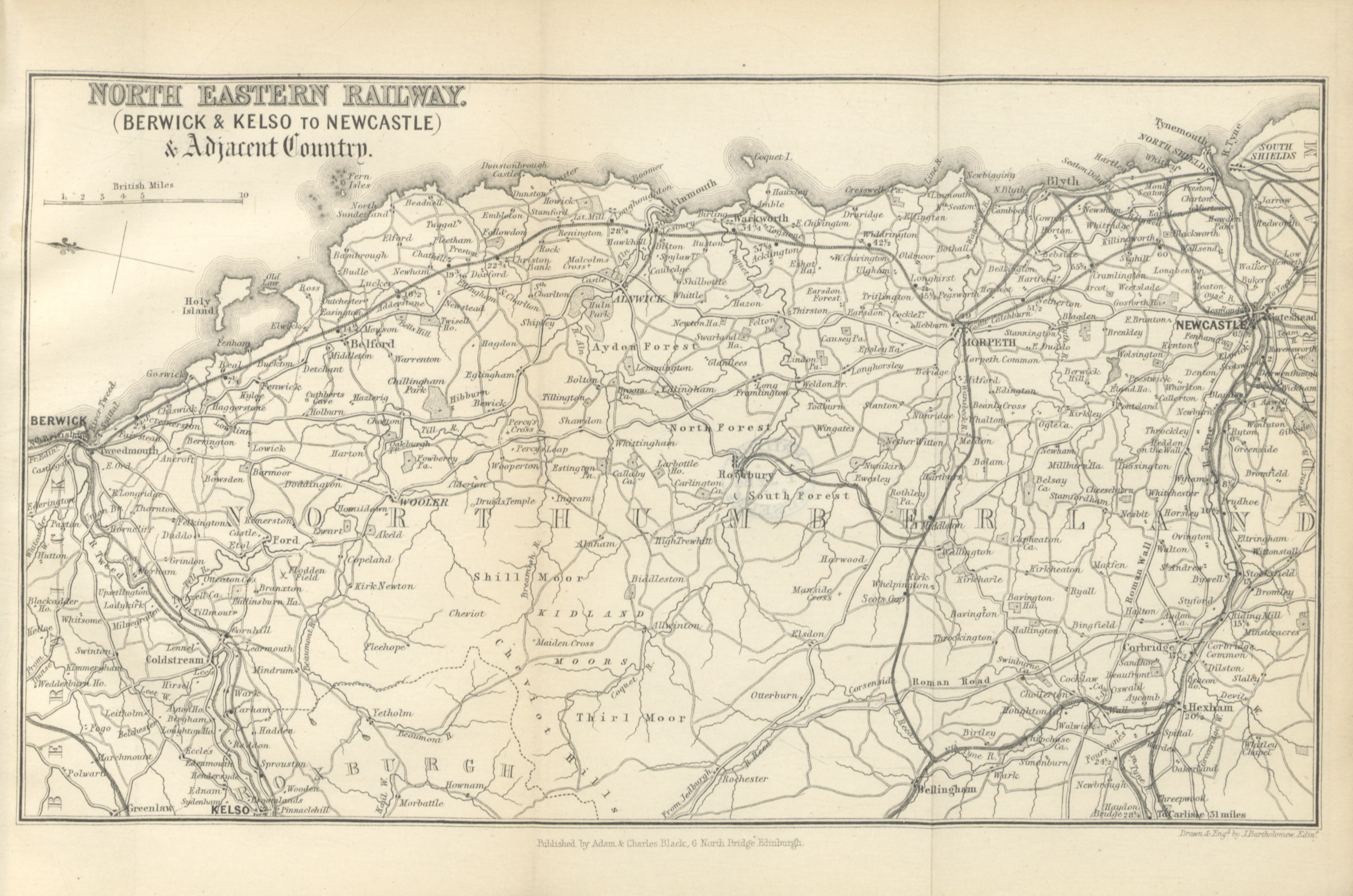
1884 map of East Coast Main Line (map facing east)

Dickman was convicted of the murder of John Innes Nisbet, which took place on a train travelling between Newcastle railway station and Alnmouth railway station, on 18 March 1910. Nisbet had been carrying a bag containing the wages for a colliery. His body was discovered in a train compartment in a full-width compartment carriage (with no aisle and no corridor); he had died of five gunshot wounds to the head and his bag had been stolen along with £370 of colliery wages that were never recovered (the near empty bag was later found in a local mineshaft with only a few coins inside). Dickman's clothing was examined and appeared to be stained with blood, and his Burberry overcoat showed signs of being recently scrubbed with paraffin, a substance used at the time for removal of bloodstains. Police also later found evidence that Dickman had received a pistol from a gunsmith in October 1909.

R v Dickman
- Court: Northumberland assizes, Moot Hall, Newcastle upon Tyne
- Decided: 6 July 1910
- Verdict: Guilty

Case history
- Appealed to: Court of Appeal (England and Wales)
- Subsequent action: capital punishment

Court membership
- Judge sitting: Mr Justice Coleridge.

On 6 July Dickman was convicted by a jury of the murder of Nisbet and he was sentenced to death by Mr Justice Coleridge. Dickman's legal team launched an immediate appeal to the Court of Appeal, which was rejected on the basis that sufficient evidence of guilt was established, and that the trial judge committed no reversible error. The Home Secretary, Winston Churchill, also refused to intervene and Dickman was hanged in Newcastle Gaol on 10 August.

== Aftermath ==
There was some doubt over the conviction, as it appeared to some people to rest on inconclusive identification evidence. However, Dickman's own brother, William, was convinced of his guilt, writing to the Newcastle Evening Chronicle to ask if anybody could possibly believe his brother was innocent unless they "looked at the evidence through smoked glasses." He added: "his own punishment will soon be over, but he has put a blot on the name of his family and all relatives will have to bear the disgrace, not for years, but for generations".

A campaign for Dickman to be reprieved was initiated, with leaflets distributed in stations. The socialist writer C. H. Norman, an ardent opponent of capital punishment, was among those who were convinced of John Dickman's innocence. It has also been claimed that Dickman's defence lawyer was incompetent.

== Legacy ==
External videos
- Murder, Mystery and my family series 1 episode 4
- Murder, Mystery and my family: Case Closed? series 3 episode 4

External videos
- Railway murders series 1 episode 3

The case is not widely remembered today. However it did figure in the 1976 BBC television series Second Verdict, the 2008 television programme Nightwatch and the 2018 BBC television series Murder, Mystery and My Family (and Case Closed?). The latter programmes suggested that two witnesses, Hall and Spinks, who said they saw Dickman and Nisbet entering the same compartment may even have been the real killers. In 2021, the case was the subject of episode 4 of Railway Murders.

Two episodes of the radio show The Black Museum hosted by Orson Welles were based on Dickman's case. One, "The Tan Shoes" featured Sir John Gielgud and Sir Ralph Richardson.

However it has been suggested that Dickman was also guilty of two previous murders, of Caroline Mary Luard at Ightham, Kent in 1908 and Hermann Cohen in Sunderland in 1909.

== See also ==
- Franz Müller
- Murder of Deborah Linsley – 1988 English murder victim

== Bibliography ==
- Eddleston, John (2025). Murder on the Train. Pen & Sword. ISBN 9781036124922.
- Janes, Diane (2007). Edwardian Murder: Ightham & the Morpeth Train Robbery. Stroud: Sutton Publishing. ISBN 978-0752449456.
- Rowan-Hamilton, S. O. (1926). Trial of John Alexander Dickman. Edinburgh: William Hodge & Co.
