= Edith Thompson and Frederick Bywaters =

British crime couple

Edith Jessie Thompson
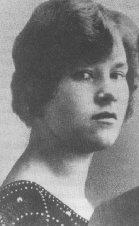
- Born: Edith Jessie Graydon; 25 December 1893; Dalston, London, England
- Died: 9 January 1923 (aged 29); HMP Holloway, London, England
- Cause of death: Execution by hanging
- Resting place: City of London Cemetery, London, England
- Occupations: Chief buyer at Carlton & Prior
- Spouse: Percy Thompson (m. 1916; died 1922)
- Status: Executed
- Conviction: Murder (11 December 1922)
- Penalty: Death
- Accomplice: Frederick Bywaters

Details
- Victims: Percy Thompson

Frederick Bywaters
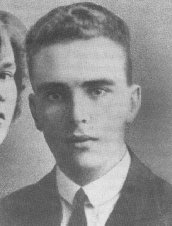
- Born: 27 June 1902
- Died: 9 January 1923 (aged 20); HMP Pentonville, London, England
- Cause of death: Execution by hanging
- Resting place: HMP Pentonville, London, England
- Occupation: Merchant seaman
- Status: Executed
- Conviction: Murder (11 December 1922)
- Penalty: Death
- Accomplice: Edith Thompson

Details
- Victims: Percy Thompson

Edith Jessie Thompson (25 December 1893 – 9 January 1923) and Frederick Edward Francis Bywaters (27 June 1902 – 9 January 1923) were a British couple executed for the murder of Thompson's husband Percy. Their case became a cause célèbre.

== Early life ==
Edith Thompson was born Edith Jessie Graydon on 25 December 1893, at 97 Norfolk Road (now Cecilia Road) in Dalston, London, the first of the five children of William Eustace Graydon (1867–1941), a clerk with the Imperial Tobacco Company, and his wife Ethel Jessie Graydon (née Liles) (1872–1938), the daughter of a police constable. During her childhood, Edith was a happy, talented girl who excelled at dancing and acting, and was academically bright, with a natural ability in arithmetic. After leaving school in 1909 she joined a firm of clothing manufacturers, Louis London, near Aldgate station in London. Then, in 1911, she was employed at Carlton & Prior, wholesale milliners, in the Barbican and later in Aldersgate. Edith quickly established a reputation as a stylish and intelligent woman and was ultimately promoted to their chief buyer, making regular trips to Paris on behalf of the company.

In 1909, at the age of 15, Edith met Percy Thompson who was three years her senior. After a six-year engagement, they were married at St Barnabas, Manor Park on 15 January 1916. At first, the couple lived in Retreat Road in Westcliff-on-Sea, before buying a house at 41 Kensington Gardens in the then-fashionable London suburb of Ilford in July 1920. With both their careers flourishing, they lived a comfortable life.

== Acquaintance with Bywaters ==
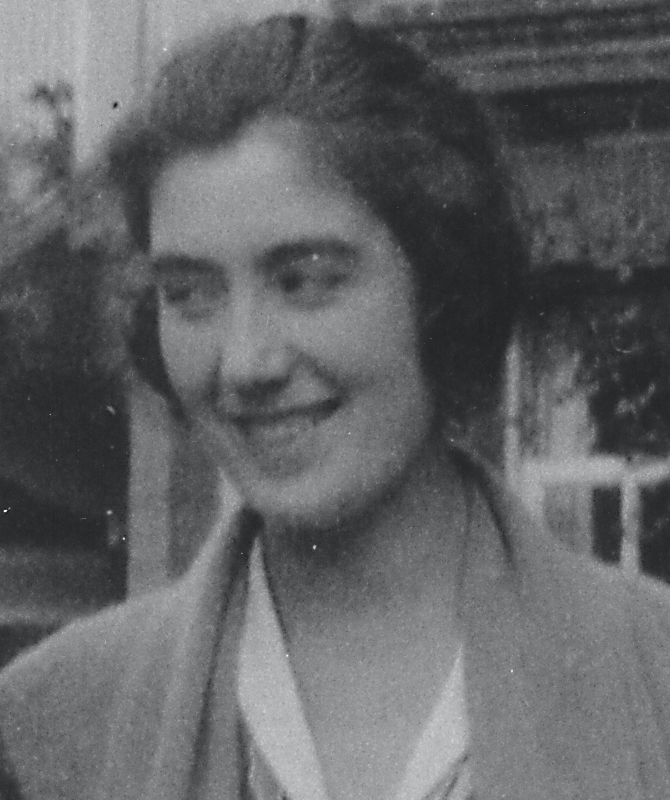
Edith Thompson, c. 1920

In 1920, the couple became acquainted with 18-year-old Frederick Bywaters, although Bywaters and Edith Thompson had met nine years earlier when Bywaters, then aged nine, had been a schoolfriend of Edith's younger brothers.

Frederick Bywaters had enlisted in the merchant navy. The 26-year-old Edith was immediately attracted to Bywaters, who was handsome and impulsive and whose stories of his travels around the world excited Edith's love of romantic adventure. To Edith, the youthful Bywaters represented her romantic ideal; by comparison, 29-year-old Percy seemed staid and conventional. Percy – oblivious to the emerging romantic attraction between his wife and Bywaters – welcomed the youth into their company. Shortly thereafter, the trio – joined by Edith's sister Avis – holidayed in Shanklin on the Isle of Wight. Upon their return, Percy invited Bywaters to lodge with them.

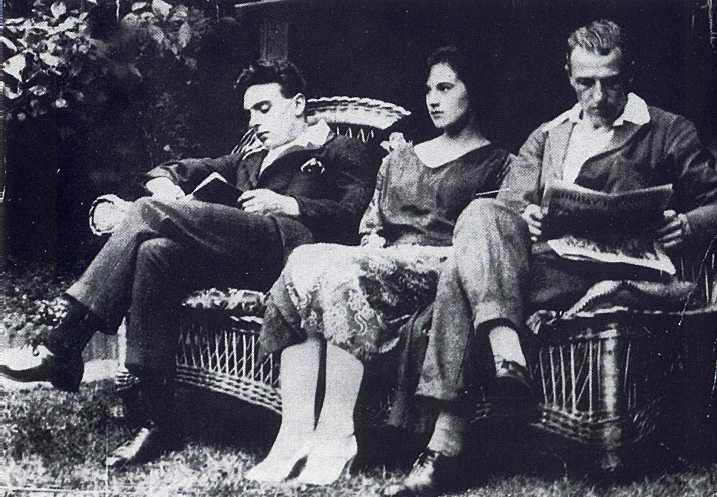
Frederick Bywaters; Edith; and Percy Thompson. 10 July 1921

=== Affair ===
While holidaying upon the Isle of Wight in June 1921, Edith and Bywaters began an affair. Initially, Percy was unaware of this although he gradually noticed his wife was drifting away from him. Matters came to a head barely a month after the affair started. A trivial incident in the Thompsons' garden triggered a violent row during which Percy Thompson struck his wife and caused her to fall over some furniture. Bywaters intervened and Thompson ordered him out of the house. The Thompsons' sitting tenant, a Mrs Lester, commented on Mrs Thompson's bruises in one of her statements to police. From September 1921 until September 1922, Bywaters was at sea and during this time Edith Thompson wrote to him frequently. After his return, they met up again.

== Murder ==
On 3 October 1922, the Thompsons attended a performance at the Criterion Theatre in Piccadilly Circus, London, together with Edith's uncle and aunt, Mr and Mrs J. Laxton. They left the theatre at 11 pm and all went to Piccadilly Circus tube station, where they separated. The Thompsons caught the 11:30 pm train to Ilford. As they walked along Belgrave Road, between De Vere and Endsleigh Gardens, a man jumped out from behind some bushes near their home and attacked Percy. After a violent struggle, during which Edith Thompson was knocked to the ground, Percy was stabbed. Mortally wounded, he died before Edith could summon help. The attacker fled. Neighbours later reported hearing a woman (here assumed to have been Edith) screaming hysterically and shouting "Oh don't, oh don't" several times. By the time police arrived Edith had not composed herself. At the police station the following day she was distressed. She was unaware that Bywaters was already a suspect: he was arrested that evening and taken to Ilford Police Station. The police confronted her with Bywaters. One of the inspectors, Frank Hall, untruthfully told her that Bywaters had already confessed. She then admitted to the police that she knew who the assailant was and provided the police with details of her association with Bywaters.

The police investigated further and discovered a series of more than 60 love letters from Edith Thompson to Bywaters. The letters were the only tangible evidence linking Thompson to the killer. In Stratford Magistrates Court her defence argued that the letters did not connect Mrs Thompson to the place or manner of the murder. Accordingly they did not allow for consideration of common purpose, namely that if two people agree to achieve the death of a third, and one of these people acts on the expressed intentions of both, both are equally guilty. The presiding magistrate decided that the letters should be admitted and that the court at the Old Bailey would rule on it again. Thompson and Bywaters were both committed for trial, charged with murder.

== Trial ==
The trial began on 6 December 1922 at the Old Bailey, before Mr Justice Shearman, with Bywaters defended by Cecil Whiteley KC, and Thompson by Sir Henry Curtis-Bennett KC. The prosecution for the Crown was led by the Solicitor-General Sir Thomas Inskip, assisted by Travers Humphreys. Bywaters had cooperated completely. He had led police to the murder weapon he concealed after the murder, and consistently maintained that he had acted without Edith's knowledge.

Thompson's love letters were produced as evidence of incitement to murder. The extant letters date from November 1921 to the end of September 1922. They run to over 55,000 words and afford a day-to-day account of her life in London when her lover Bywaters was at sea. In a few passages of these letters, she writes about her longing to be free of her husband, Percy. She refers to grinding glass light bulbs to shards and feeding them to Percy mixed into mashed potato, and on another occasion feeding him poison. She wrote of a woman who had lost three husbands and remarked, "I can't even lose one." Thompson described how she had carried out her own abortion after becoming pregnant by Bywaters.

Thompson's counsel urged her not to testify, stressing that the burden of proof lay with the prosecution and that there was nothing they could prove other than that she had been present at the murder, but she rejected his advice. She was determined to give evidence, imagining that she could save Bywaters. As Curtis-Bennett later observed, she had no conception of the danger she was in. She made a poor impression on the judge and the jury, particularly when she repeatedly contradicted herself. She had claimed that she had never attempted to poison her husband and references in her letters to attempting to kill him were merely attempts to impress her paramour. In answer to several questions relating to the meaning of some of the passages in her letters, she simply said "I have no idea."

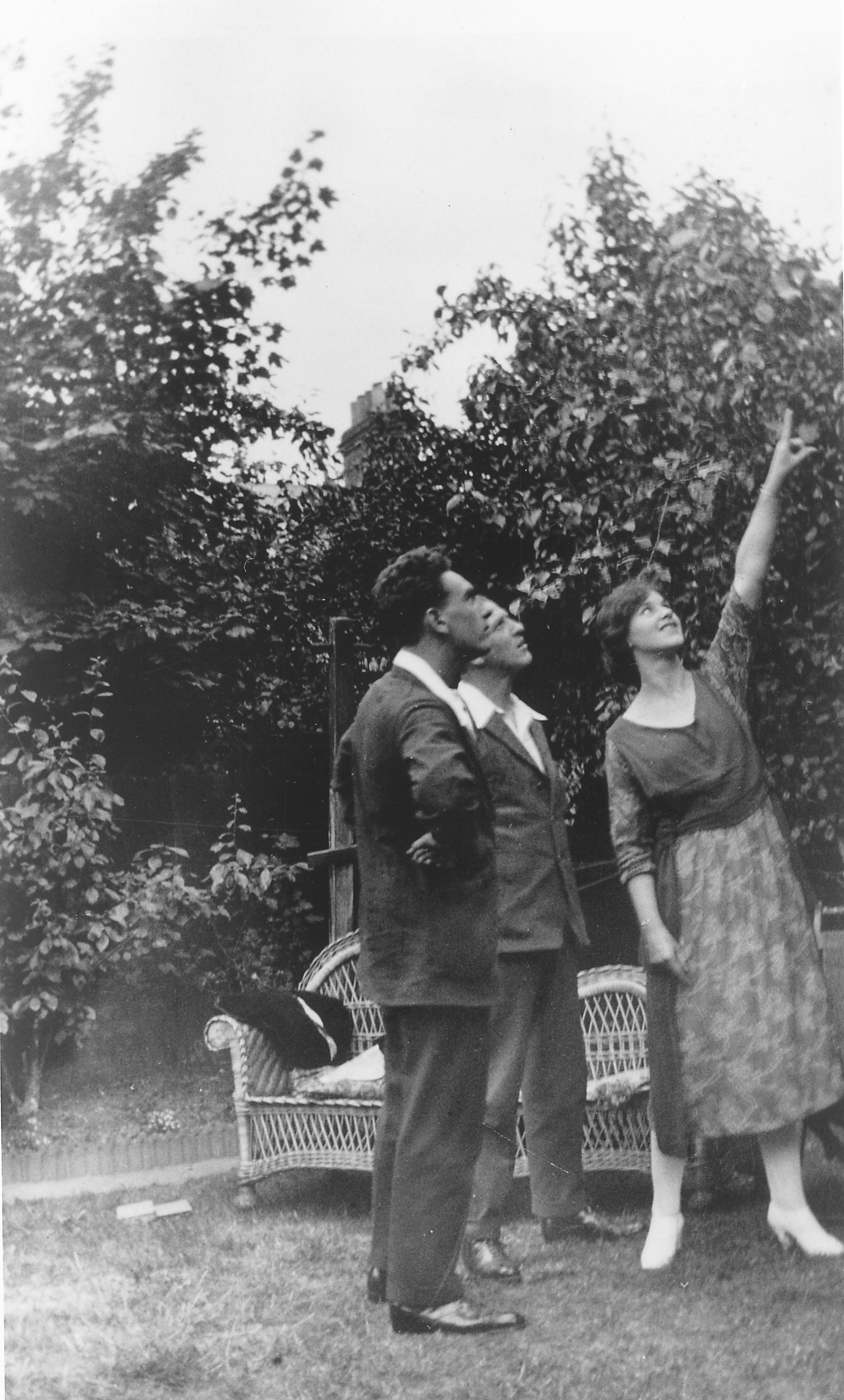
(Left to right) Frederick Bywaters, Percy Thompson, and Edith Thompson in July 1921

Bywaters stated that Edith Thompson had known nothing of his plans, nor could she have, as he had not intended to murder her husband. His aim had been to confront Percy, he claimed, and to force him to deal with the situation. When Percy threatened to shoot him and reacted in a superior manner, Bywaters lost his temper. Edith Thompson, he repeatedly claimed, had made no suggestion to him to kill Percy, nor did she know that Bywaters intended to confront him. In discussing the letters, Bywaters stated that he had never believed Edith had attempted to harm her husband, but that he did believe she had a vivid imagination, which was fuelled by the novels she enjoyed reading. He felt that in her letters she viewed herself in some way as one of the fictional characters she had read about.

=== Conviction ===
On 11 December the jury returned a verdict of guilty against both defendants, who were sentenced to death by hanging. Thompson became hysterical and started screaming in the court while Bywaters loudly protested Thompson's innocence, stating: "I say the verdict of the jury is wrong. Edith Thompson is not guilty."

== Imprisonment ==
Before and during the trial, Thompson and Bywaters were the subjects of highly sensationalist and critical media commentary, but after they were sentenced to death there was a dramatic shift in public attitudes and in media coverage. Nearly a million people signed a petition against the death sentences. Bywaters in particular attracted admiration for his fierce loyalty and protectiveness towards Edith Thompson but she was widely regarded as the controlling mind that had set it all up. It was generally considered abhorrent to hang a woman (no woman had been executed in Britain since the baby farmer Rhoda Willis in 1907). Despite the petition and a new confession from Bywaters (in which he once again declared Thompson to be completely innocent), Home Secretary, William Bridgeman refused a reprieve. A few days before their executions, Thompson was told that the date of execution had been fixed, at which point she lost her composure. She spent the last few days of her life in a state of near-hysteria, crying, screaming, moaning and unable to eat.

=== Execution ===
On 9 January 1923 in Holloway Prison, the 29-year-old Edith Thompson collapsed in terror at the prospect of her hanging. Heavily sedated by order of the prison governor, almost unconscious, she was carried to the gallows by four prison warders. In Pentonville Prison, the 20-year-old Frederick Bywaters, who had tried since his arrest to save Thompson from imprisonment and execution, was himself hanged.

The ordeal of executing Edith Thompson had a profound effect on her hangman John Ellis.

The two executions occurred simultaneously at 9:00 am, only about 1/2 mile (800 m) apart. Holloway and Pentonville prisons (respectively for women and men) are very close together in North London. Later, as was the rule, the bodies of Thompson and Bywaters were initially buried within the walls of the prisons in which they had been executed.

== Burial ==
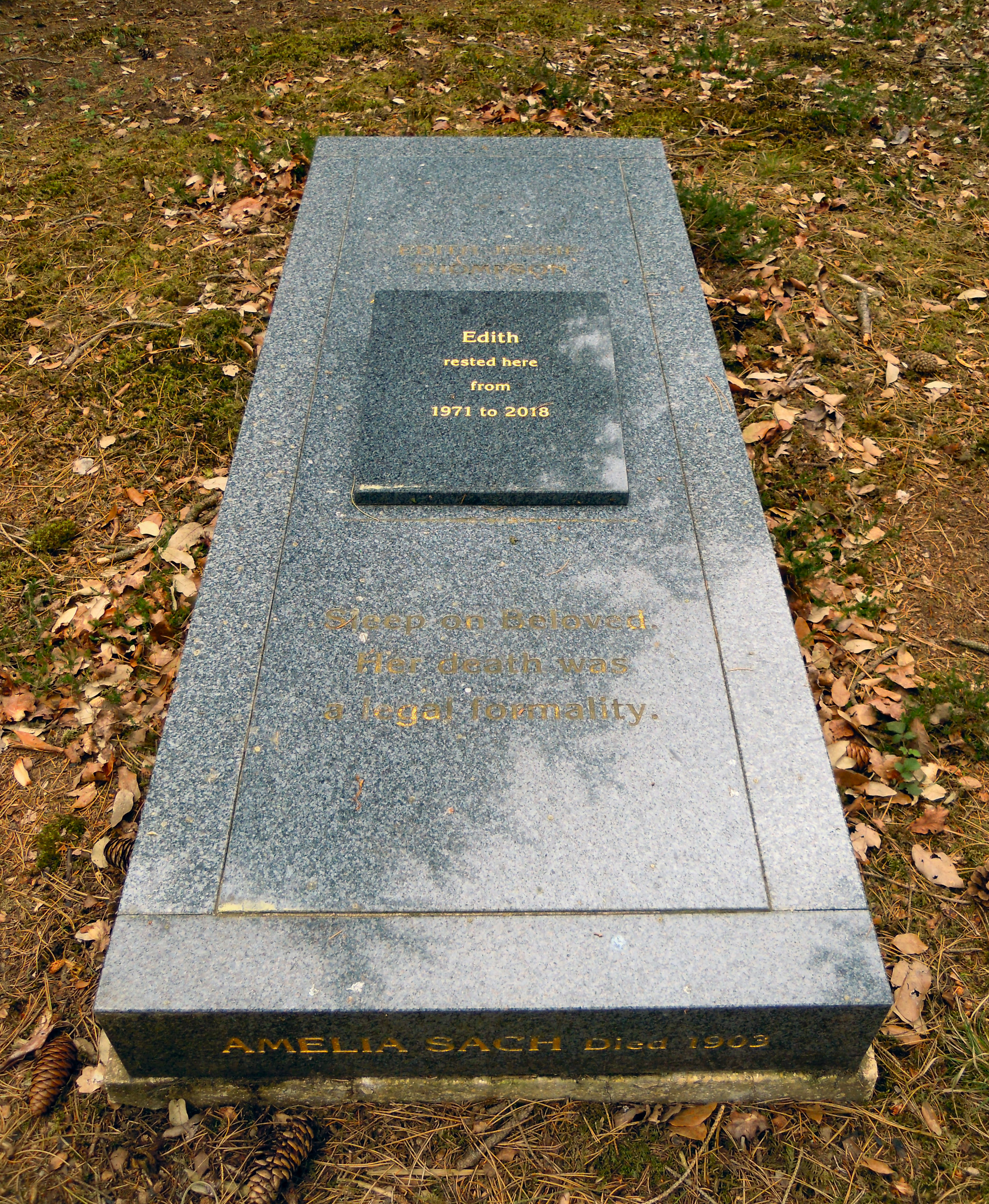
Edith Thompson's former grave in Brookwood Cemetery. Her body was exhumed in 2018

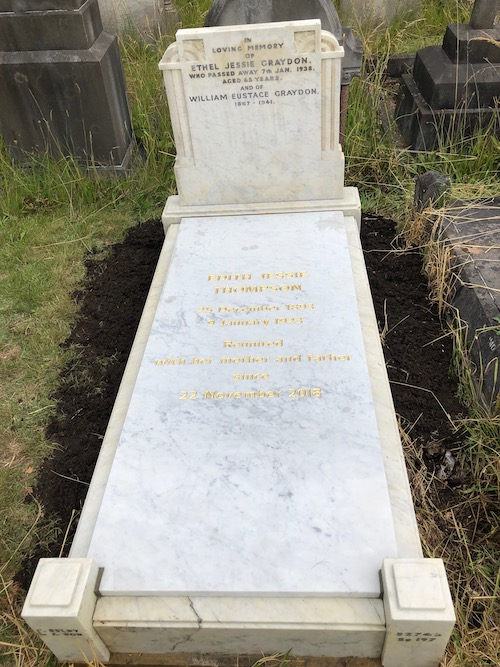
Edith Thompson's new grave in the City of London Cemetery, June 2019

The body of Edith Thompson was initially buried in an unmarked grave within the walls of Holloway Prison, as was customary. In 1971, the prison underwent an extensive programme of rebuilding, during which the bodies of all the executed women were exhumed for reburial outside the confines of the prison. With the exception of Ruth Ellis, the remains of the women executed at Holloway (Edith Thompson, Styllou Christofi, Amelia Sach and Annie Walters) were reburied in a single grave at Brookwood Cemetery in Surrey.

The new grave (in plot 117) remained unmarked for over 20 years. It was acquired in the 1980s by René Weis and Audrey Russell, who had interviewed Avis Graydon (Edith Thompson's surviving sister) at length in the 1970s. On 13 November 1993, a grey granite memorial was placed on plot 117, and dedicated to the memory of the four women buried there. The grave and plot were formally consecrated by the Reverend Barry Arscott of St. Barnabas, Manor Park, the church in which Edith Thompson was married in January 1916. Edith Thompson's details appear prominently on the face of the tombstone, together with the epitaph: "Sleep on beloved. Her death was a legal formality". The names of the other three women are inscribed around the edges of the tombstone. The precise location of Thompson's former grave within Brookwood Cemetery is 51°18′13.67″N 0°37′33.33″W.

The remains of Frederick Bywaters still lie in an unmarked grave within the walls of HMP Pentonville where they were originally buried.

The remains of Percy Thompson are buried at the City of London Cemetery.

On 22 November 2018, Edith Thompson's remains were exhumed from Brookwood Cemetery, and two days later formally buried alongside her parents, in accordance with her mother's wishes, in the City of London Cemetery.

== Critiques of the case and the trial ==
René Weis echoes a trend of recent and older suggestions that Edith Thompson was innocent of murder. In his letter to the Home Secretary, Douglas Hurd, in 1988, he notes that the Crown used a selection of her letters in Court to generate a climate of prejudice against her as an immoral adulteress who seduced a young man eight years her junior. Weis writes: "Despite the fact that there is no evidence of any kind in the letters or otherwise that Edith Thompson knew that her husband would be assaulted that night in that particular place and in that manner, the Solicitor-General stated in his opening address to the jury that 'there is the undoubted evidence in the letters upon which you can find that there was a preconcerted meeting between Mrs Thompson and Bywaters at the place.' As only half of Edith Thompson's correspondence was submitted in Court, the jury may well have been led to believe, by this erroneous claim, that a reference to the place, the time, and the manner occurred in one of the letters withheld from them. That the jury was furthermore influenced by the judge's openly expressed disgust concerning the sexual immorality of the correspondence is on record in a letter which a juror wrote to The Daily Telegraph thirty years later: 'It was my duty to read them [the letters] to the members of the jury ... "Nauseous" is hardly strong enough to describe their contents ... The jury performed a painful duty, but Mrs Thompson's letters were her own condemnation.'"

It is true that Mr Justice Shearman did instruct the jury to find Edith Thompson guilty only if they were convinced that she had lured her husband to the place where he was murdered. In his charge to the jury, he noted: "Now, I am going to ask you to consider only one question in your deliberations, and that is, was it an arranged thing between the woman and the man? ... if you think that when she saw him [Bywaters] there that evening he came there under her direction and information that she had given him as to where she would be about that time – if you think she knew perfectly well as soon as she set eyes on him that he was there to murder, she is guilty of murder too." The judge then turned to Edith Thompson's letters, focusing on the ones referring to poison and ground glass, directing the jury to 'look at these words' when Edith related to Bywaters how she had pretended to Avis that Percy's state of health worried her. Avis had testified in court that this incident was a fabrication regarding a bottle of medicinal tincture of opium which she, Avis, had poured down the sink.

The judge saw it differently and restated the prosecution's case: "It is said that she is already preparing for witnesses in case there should be a murder case; that is what is said." He failed to acknowledge that this point had been tackled head-on by the defence, as it was his duty to do. Again, commenting on a passage in the letters in which Edith Thompson refers to "this thing that I am going to do for both of us, will it ever at all make any difference between us, darlint [sic], do you understand what I mean; will you ever think any the less of me?", the judge simply restates the Crown's interpretation, after pretending to the jury that he will resist interpreting the passage: "The meaning of that is for you to judge; you will fully understand that it is not for me to tell you what the letters mean ... It is said the meaning of that is 'If I poison him is it going to make any difference to you afterwards'; that is what is suggested as the plain meaning of the words." The Court of Appeal would interpret the passage similarly as self-evident proof of intent to murder, overlooking the fact that this was not a charge that was being tried.

The judge discredited Edith Thompson's account of the murder. She swooned (according to her, the judge notes) and she lied to shield the killer. Above all the witnesses who claimed to have heard her scream of "Oh don't, oh don't!" may not be reliable. In his closing comments, Mr Justice Shearman impugned the integrity of the important witness John Webber, whose house was close to the scene of the murder. Webber's is, according to the judge, a "very curious piece of evidence". If Webber can be trusted to tell the truth, then there is corroborative proof of Edith Thompson's spontaneous panic and hysteria during the fight and stabbings. The judge directs the jury: "You know he [Webber] is some way off; I am not saying it is true; it is for you to say whether it is accurate, or whether it is imaginary, or whether he has made a mistake." Such direct undermining of a bona fide witness chimed with the judge's evident hostility towards Edith Thompson. His wider anti-feminist bias at the trial was evident and extensively commented on at the time. Thus he consistently referred to the jury as "gentlemen" in spite of the fact that the jury included a woman juror.

Shearman labelled Edith an "adulterer" and therefore deceitful and wicked and, by implication, easily capable of murder. Her letters were full of "insensate silly affection". He similarly repeatedly called Bywaters an "adulterer". However, Filson Young, in writing contemporaneously with the trial in Notable British Trials (1923), suggests that it was the young of that generation who needed to learn morality: "Mr Justice Shearman frequently referred to Bywaters as 'the adulterer', apparently quite unconscious of the fact that, to people of Bywaters' generation, educated in the ethics of dear labour and cheap pleasure, of commercial sport and the dancing hall, adultery is merely a quaint ecclesiastical term for what seems to them the great romantic adventure of their lives. Adultery to such people may or may not be 'sporting,' but its wrongness is not a matter that would trouble them for a moment. Sinai, for them, is wrapped in impenetrable cloud. And if we are not prepared to adapt the laws of Sinai to the principles of the night club and thé dansant, I see no other alternative but to educate again our young in the eternal verities on which the law is based." The Court of Appeal endorsed the judge's description of the accused as adulterers: "Now, the learned judge, in his summing-up to the jury, spoke of the charge as a common or ordinary charge of a wife and an adulterer murdering the husband. That was a true and appropriate description."

The deficit in evidence as to direct arrangement was conceded by the Court of Appeal. However, it pursued a line of reasoning to the effect that proof of instigation of murder in a community of purpose without evidence of rebuttal raises an "inference of preconcerted arrangement". The Court of Appeal held that her earlier prolonged incitement to murder revealed in her letters, combined with her lies about what happened on the night of the murder told to several witnesses, up until her second witness statement, which was open to being found untrustworthy, her meetings with Bywaters on the day of the murder, and the content of her last letter, was sufficient to convict her of arranging the murder. The Court of Appeal seemed to take a narrower approach to "principal in the second degree" than the Court, but it is unclear, because "preconcerted arrangement" admits of different shades of meaning. The Court of Appeal seemed determined to forestall any argument based on the mere method or timing of the murder being unagreed to, if there was other plausible evidence of a preconcerted object of murder. Its narrow judgment is unsatisfactory to those who now allege Edith played no part in the murder itself. However, its judgement is limited in extent to the point it was addressing, which was continuity of purpose up until the commission of the murder. If non-agreement as to the means and timing of the murder be conceded, there was merit to its claim that the case "exhibits from beginning to end no redeeming feature".

In his address to the jury Curtis-Bennett attempted to cast her adultery as defensible in the context of the "glamorous aura" of a "great love", seeking to overlook the point continually being made by the judge at the trial that the case concerned only an adulterer and an (adulterous) wife. In his summing-up, Curtis-Bennett said of Edith: "This is not an ordinary charge of murder ... Am I right or wrong in saying that this woman is one of the most extraordinary personalities that you or I have ever met? ... Have you ever read ... more beautiful language of love? Such things have been very seldom put by pen upon paper. This is the woman you have to deal with, not some ordinary woman. She is one of those striking personalities met with from time to time who stand out for some reason or another ... You are men of the world and you must know that where there is a liaison which includes some one who is married, it will be part of the desire of that person to keep secret the relations from the other partner. It is not the sort of thing that they would bring to the knowledge of their partner for life." Curtis-Bennett later claimed that he could have saved her had she not rejected his advice not to take the witness stand. His failure to secure her acquittal had affected him deeply. He maintained her innocence of murder throughout his life, claiming that Edith "paid the extreme penalty for her immorality".

In Notable British Trials, Filson Young takes a similar approach, suggesting that Curtis-Bennett should have resigned his brief at her insistence on going into the witness box, although his quest for fame and fortune could never have allowed it. The famous defender Sir Edward Marshall Hall KC similarly stated that he would have surrendered his defence brief if she had defied him the way she did Curtis-Bennett. Curtis-Bennett said to Stanley Bishop, a journalist, "She spoiled her chances by her evidence and by her demeanour. I had a perfect answer to everything which I am sure would have won an acquittal if she had not been a witness. She was a vain woman and an obstinate one. She had an idea that she could carry the jury. Also she realised the enormous public interest, and decided to play up to it by entering the witness-box. Her imagination was highly developed, but it failed to show her the mistake she was making." One mistake that Edith appeared to make was in testifying that Bywaters had led her into the poison plots. Delusion was no defence to murder and this could not save her. Curtis-Bennett argued a more legally secure but evidentially weak defence based on Edith acting the part of poisoner, or engaging in a fantasy. The fact that the two Home Office pathologists, Sir Bernard Spilsbury and Dr John Webster, both concluded categorically in their independent post mortem reports that there were no traces of poison or glass in Percy Thompson's body should have been proof of the fantasy defence.

One of her main lines of defence – that she was constantly seeking a divorce or separation from her husband, and that it rather than murder was the main object of the attested five-year compact between her and Bywaters shown in her letters – was dismissed by the judge as a sham. "If you think these letters are genuine, they mean that she is involved in a continual practice of deceit; concealing the fact of her connection with Bywaters, and not reiterating it with requests for her husband to let her go." Filson Young argues that the defence used the wrong tactics. He said: "If the defence had said on behalf of Mrs Thompson, 'I did not murder Percy Thompson, I had nothing to do with it. I had no knowledge of it, and I was stunned and horrified when it took place, and I defy the prosecution to introduce any evidence with which that denial is not absolutely compatible,' and had rested on that, I do not think you could have found a British jury to convict her." There is undoubtedly an air of a presumption of guilt surrounding her trial. However, Young's point – that the burden of proof was on the Crown to prove murder, rather than on the defence to rebut a presumption of murder – is certainly a valid one. The judge, Mr Justice Shearman, placed much weight on inconsistencies in her evidence, particularly her statements to the police concerning the night of the murder that suggested she had intended to conceal her witness of the crime, and perhaps conversations of criminal intent with Bywaters preceding it, although she always vigorously denied foreknowledge of it. In The Innocence of Edith Thompson, Lewis Broad states that the judge's summing up was considered to be at the time "deadly, absolutely against her" and that he 'was pressing the case much more strongly than the Solicitor-General had done.'

The defence did succeed in some points, showing that guesswork by the prosecution over ambiguous content of some of the letters was fanciful and wrong. An autopsy on Percy Thompson had failed to reveal any evidence that he had been fed ground glass or any type of detectable poison. That her letters did not necessarily reflect her deeds in respect of the so-termed poison plots was fairly clear. Even though perceived in her favour by Lewis Broad, Filson Young, Edgar Lustgarten, René Weis, Laura Thompson and other students of the case, the Court of Appeal held the poison-plots against her and against him: "If the question is, as I think it was, whether these letters were evidence of a protracted, continuous incitement to Bywaters to commit the crime which he did in the end commit, it really is of comparatively little importance whether the appellant was truly reporting something which she had done, or falsely reporting something which she merely pretended to do." Moreover, "it matters not whether those letters show or, at any rate, go to show, that there was between this appellant and Mrs Thompson an agreement tending to the same end. Those letters were material as throwing light, not only upon the question by whom was this deed done, but what was the intent, what was the purpose with which it was done" said the Court of Appeal to Bywaters.

James Douglas, the chief reporter for the Express papers covering the trial in 1922/23, also took issue with the verdict, writing "I think the hanging of Mrs Thompson is a miscarriage of mercy and justice ... I believe she was an adulteress. But we do not hang a woman for adultery. The Mosaic Law stoned the adulteress to death. Our law punishes adultery by divorce, not by death. Therefore, in judging Mrs Thompson we must not mix up the crime of murder with the sin of adultery ... Let us condemn her as being guilty of all she charges herself with in her letters. Having done so, let us see what she is not guilty of. 1. It was not her hand that struck down her husband. 2. Her husband did not die by poison or powdered glass administered by her hand. 3. There is no evidence that she put poison or glass in his food. 4. There is no evidence that at any time in any way she ever made any attempt on the life of her husband. 5. There is no evidence that she was guilty or premeditated connivance, collusion, or complicity in the actual crime. 6. There is no evidence that she was an accessory before the fact, apart from the incitements in her own letters. 7. There is no evidence that she actually aided and abetted the striking of the fatal blows. 8. There is no evidence of wilful murder against her. Therefore, in her case murder is not murder, but merely a legal extension of the legal definition of murder. It is a moral, not a physical, crime. It is a sin of the soul, and not a consummation of sin in the act of slaying. I might amplify this catalogue of the innocence or non-guiltiness of Mrs Thompson, but my eight points suffice to drive home my argument that her guilt stopped short of wilful murder if only by a hair's breadth was a broad abyss separating the will from the deed. One last word. If Mrs Thompson had not been walking with her husband when he was murdered, would the jury have found her guilty of wilful murder? Why should she be hanged by reason of what may have been the unforeseen accident of her presence?"

In Verdict in Dispute (1949), Edgar Lustgarten states that "The Thompson verdict is now recognized as bad, and the trial from which it sprang stands out as an example of the evils that may flow from an attitude of mind." He continues with "There was no failure of law; there was no failure of procedure; there was no failure to observe and abide by all the rules. It was from first to last a failure in human understanding; a failure to grasp and comprehend a personality not envisaged in the standard legal textbooks and driven by forces far more powerful and eternal than those that are studied in the Inns of Court." From this it may be reasonably surmised that his essay is something of an apology for Edith, whose culpability he diminishes on the basis that "she was a woman of quality whose talents were frustrated". He adds: "She was a remarkable and complex personality, endowed with signal attributes of body and of mind. She had intelligence, vitality, a natural grace and poise, sensitiveness, humour and illumining all these that quintessential femininity that fascinates the male." He writes: "[In the absence of her letters] all that could be said against her was that she had lied in a futile attempt to protect and cover Bywaters. That might make her an accessory after the fact. It could not bring her into danger of the rope." Although Lustgarten does not allege any defect in legal procedure, he says that the Court was unable to understand questions of "sex and psychology" and the consequent possibility of fantasy.

A critique of the conduct of her trial and the state of the law was made by Lewis Broad. He argued that it was the misfortune of Edith Thompson that she was unable to separate herself from the prejudice due to her immorality whereas, if it had been a former crime, she was entitled not to have it mentioned. He also attacked the judge for using morally prejudiced language to incite the prejudice of the jury. He concedes that it was within the rules for the jury to decide what the words in Edith's letters meant and what was intended by them. Broad went on to attack the general conduct of the trial: 1. She should have been granted a separate trial in that she was handicapped by having to appear alongside Bywaters. 2. The judge allowed the jury to be inflamed by prejudice on account of her immorality. 3. Suspicion based on prejudice was allowed to take the place of proof of meaning, motive and intention in respect of her letters. Broad also levels criticism against the prosecution for the unfair use of her letters at trial, covering such matters as: a) 1,500 word extract used at trial from 25,000 words in total, which in turn were less than half of her total of 51,000 or so words. Many of the letters were censored by the court during the trial, because they dealt with subjects such as menstruation and orgasm, subjects that were not then considered fit for public discussion. b) There was only one unambiguous reference to poison in the five months preceding the murder. c) The meaning of uncertain phrases were allowed to be suggested by the Crown and were determined to prejudice the jury. d) The context of the murder suggested no element of planning. e) Despite their meandering and casual discussion of the subject matter, Percy's murder, there is nothing in the letters that amounted to agreement or one. f) There was a break in the chain of causation after Bywaters had indicated he did not want to continue to see Edith, evidenced from her letters from 20 June to 12 September 1922. g) That the letters were part of a fantasy between the parties was not put forth to the jury.

The "broken chain" theory of the case, favoured by Broad, arguing that there is no causal link between Edith's letters and the actual murder, because of the length of time separating them and the manner of the murder, is developed by the UCL professor of jurisprudence William Twining. In Rethinking Evidence: Exploratory Essays (2006), pp. 344–396, Twining argues that a Wigmorean, "decompositional" analysis of the charges brought against Edith Thompson demonstrates how unsatisfactory the verdict against her was in law. Twining writes that "For the prosecution to convict Edith, they had to prove that the attack was premeditated. Even if one totally discounts Freddy's evidence about the events of the evening (and his story of the period up to 11 p.m. was generally consistent and was largely corroborated by the Graydons), there is almost nothing to support the proposition that the attack was premeditated. There was no evidence to support the proposition that the knife was purchased recently in order to attack Percy; there was no evidence in support of the proposition that Bywaters put the knife in his pocket that morning because he planned to attack Percy – the best that the prosecution could do was point out that there was no corroboration for his claim that he was in the habit of carrying it." The "tea-room" passage (exhibit 60) – "Don't forget what we talked in the Tea Room, I'll still risk and try if you will – we only have 3½ years left darlingest. Try and help." – was interpreted by the judge as referring to either poisoning Percy Thompson or to using a dagger. This was also the prosecution theory, that "what" referred to killing Percy; the defence claimed that "what" referred to Freddy trying to find Edith a post abroad so that they could elope.

Twining argues that a close Wigmorean analysis allows for the following conclusions: "For example, the judge's suggestion can be attacked on the following grounds: 1. it is sheer speculation, with no evidence to support it; 2. it involves a petitio principii in that it assumes what is seeks to prove; 3. it does not make sense of the passage: 'Don't forget what we talked in the Tea Room [about whether to use poison or a dagger], I'll still risk and try if you will we have only 3½ years left darlingest.'" Twining continues with "Even if we totally discount testimony of both accused that it referred to eloping (the 'risks' being financial and/or of social stigma), the context of the letter as a whole and the words '3½ years left' both tend to support the judgement that an innocent explanation is a good deal more likely than the prosecution's interpretation. At the, very least, such factors seem to me to cast a reasonable doubt on that interpretation, yet this passage was the main item of evidence in support of the conspiracy theory."

A feminist review of the case occurs in Laura Thompson's 2018 book, Rex v Edith Thompson: A Tale of Two Murders. Thompson (not a relative) claims that Edith Thompson was the victim of a highly prejudicial "gendered" trial, with the trial judge's and the Appeal Court judges' bias against the accused woman playing a key part in her conviction.

In March 2018 the BBC presented a thoughtful evaluation in an episode of the series Murder, Mystery and My Family in which barristers Sasha Wass and Jeremy Dein reviewed the case. Although they were unable to determine any new evidence, they agreed that there were serious issues to be addressed regarding the final summing up by the trial judge, Mr Justice Shearman. Despite acting as prosecution and defence, Wass and Dein presented a joint submission to Senior Crown Court Judge David Radford for consideration, arguing that there was no case to answer by Edith Thompson with regard to the charge that was brought against her. Judge Radford gave his opinion that the summing up in the case was deficient and had failed to offer correct direction to the jury. He considered that it had been unfair and unbalanced and that there were grounds for coming to a decision that the conviction of Edith Thompson was both unsafe and unsatisfactory. This was followed by a second BBC Two programme in 2019, with the same participants, to take account of the reburial of Edith Thompson in November 2018.

== Application for a posthumous pardon for Edith Thompson ==
In January 2023 it was reported that an application for a posthumous pardon for Edith Thompson, using the royal prerogative of mercy, would be reconsidered by the Ministry of Justice; the application, made on behalf of Thompson's heir and executor, René Weis, had initially been rejected in 2022 by the then Justice Secretary Dominic Raab. On 6 March 2023 BBC News reported that Mr Raab had referred René Weis's application on behalf of Thompson to the Criminal Cases Review Commission (CCRC), "as a potential miscarriage of justice". The BBC quotes Mr Raab's letter to Prof Weis stating that this will "allow a full investigation of your application to take place". The Times of 7 March 2023 heads its piece on the CCRC referral with "Pardon for hanged woman is step nearer after 100 years".

== In popular culture ==
=== Fiction ===
- 1924 novel – Messalina of the Suburbs by E. M. Delafield
- 1934 novel – A Pin to See the Peepshow by F. Tennyson Jesse
- 2014 novel – The Paying Guests by Sarah Waters. Partly inspired by the case.

=== Non-fiction ===
- 1952 – The Innocence of Edith Thompson: A Study in Old Bailey Justice, by Lewis Broad.
- 1988 – Criminal Justice: The True Story of Edith Thompson, by René Weis
- 2018 – Rex v Edith Thompson: A Tale of Two Murders by Laura Thompson.

=== Radio ===
- 1953 – The Black Museum: "The Sheath Knife". Dramatization of murder case, with names changed.

=== Theatre ===
- 1948 − London premiere of the 1930s play People Like Us by Frank Vosper.

=== Film ===
- 2001 – Another Life.

=== Television ===
- 1973 – Televised adaptation of A Pin to See the Peepshow by F. Tennyson Jesse
- 1981 – Lady Killers
- 2019 – Murder, Mystery and My Family

=== Video ===
- 2023 – Hanged for Adultery, the Tragic Fate of Edith Thompson by Chris Forse
- 2025 – Tales from the Hangman's Record: Hanged at Pentonville – Part Five 1920–1923 by Steve Fielding

== See also ==
- Another Life, 2001 film
- Capital punishment in the United Kingdom

== Cited works and further reading ==
- Honeycombe, Gordon (1982). The Murders of the Black Museum: 1870 - 1970. Bloomsbury Books. ISBN 978-1-85471-160-1.
- Lane, Brian (1993). Chronicle of 20th Century Murder. Virgin Publishing. ISBN 978-1-85227-436-8.
- Whittington-Egan, Richard; Whittington-Egan, Molly (1992). The Murder Almanac. Neil Wilson Publishing Ltd. ISBN 978-1-897-78404-4.
- Young, Filson (1923). Trial of Frederick Bywaters and Edith Thompson. Notable British Trials. Edinburgh: William Hodge & Co.
