= Cameo Cinema murder case =

1949 double murder in Liverpool, England

- Court: Liverpool Assizes
- Decided: 8 February 1950

Case history
- Appealed to: Court of Appeal (Criminal Division)

Court membership
- Judge sitting: Mr Justice Roland Oliver

On the evening of 19 March 1949, in the Cameo cinema in Liverpool, England, a double murder took place which led to a miscarriage of justice and the longest trial in British history at the time.

== Crime ==
While the cinema manager, Leonard Thomas, and his deputy, Bernard Catterall, counted the day's earnings, a masked man entered their office armed with a pistol. The armed robber demanded they hand over a bag of cash, and when they were reluctant, the robber fatally shot them. Empty handed, the murderer escaped from the building through an exit and down a fire escape as other members of the cinema staff came to the men's aid.

== Investigation ==
Liverpool City Police launched a huge manhunt for the killer, which turned up few leads until some months later when they received a letter from a pair of convicted criminals, a prostitute and her pimp. Jacqueline Dickson and James Northam were prepared to assist the police with information on the murders in return for immunity from prosecution. This resulted in the arrests of two Liverpool men, Charles Connolly, 26 and George Kelly, 27. Kelly had convictions for petty theft whilst Connolly had been in trouble for brawling. Despite their protests that they had never met before and both being able to produce sound alibis for the evening of 19 March, the pair were charged with the murder of the two men in the cinema.

== First trial ==
They stood trial at Liverpool Assizes in the city's St George's Hall on 12 January 1950 before Mr. Justice Roland Oliver. The prosecution's case was that Kelly had been the gunman and that Connolly had acted as lookout as well as having planned the robbery.

=== Northam's evidence ===
In his evidence, Northam alleged that he and Dickson had been present in the Bee Hive public house in Mount Pleasant with the defendants when they were plotting the crime; had seen Kelly loading a pistol; and that Kelly had borrowed his (Northam's) overcoat for use as a disguise during the robbery. Dickson stated that Kelly had borrowed a dark scarf or apron to use as a mask; trying it on in front of the customers of the crowded pub before he and Connolly boarded a tram to take them to the Edge Hill area. No other witnesses to this action were ever found. Northam claimed he had originally planned to assist in the robbery but the sight of the gun had frightened him off.

=== Graham's evidence ===
Much was made of the evidence of Robert Graham, a Preston criminal serving a sentence in Walton Prison at the same time that Kelly and Connolly were on remand there, who claimed to have carried messages between the prisoners as they sat in adjacent cells, which would have been unnecessary as the cells, which had barred doors rather than solid ones, were near enough that the men could converse freely. He also alleged that both Kelly and Connolly had separately confessed their part in the murders to him in the exercise yard, which both men denied. Graham was later rewarded for his evidence with a reduction in his sentence.

Kelly had spent almost the whole day and early evening of the murder drinking heavily and many witnesses came forward to confirm the fact that he was clearly half drunk as the day wore on. The cinema staff however, were quite certain the man who threatened them outside the manager's office before sprinting out of the building and away up a side street, so quickly they could not keep up with him, was not somebody who had been drinking. Forensic examination of the crime scene and the angle of the bullet wounds in the victims' bodies indicated that the person who fired the shots had held the gun in his left hand. The cinema fireman, who witnessed the gunman leaving through the fire exit, noted that he kept his left hand, presumably holding his gun, in his pocket. Kelly was right-handed.

After what was then one of the longest murder trials in British legal history, the jury failed to reach a verdict and a retrial was ordered, this time with the defendants tried separately.

=== Where was Charles Connolly ===
Much was made of the question of where Charles Connolly had been at the time of the shooting as it was said that his role was that of lookout. However, he was not seen near the cinema and the sequence of events tended to preclude him having played any role as look out as he neither warned George Kelly of John Catterall's arrival at the manager's office nor appeared to have been standing ready at the emergency exit which the gunman clearly had trouble opening. This led to the question of how the gunman entered the cinema, the conclusion being that he must have either gone through the auditorium from the main entrance, or that there had been an accomplice who had opened the emergency exit from the inside in advance.

=== The mystery of the cut telephone wires ===
The telephone wires at the Cameo Cinema had been cut at the foot of the spiral staircase and the police had to be called by a local resident although they arrived quickly. However, no explanation was put forward for who cut them and when. The issue of the cut wires is further complicated when considering the evidence of Northam, Dickson and Graham, none of whom detailed the issue in the planning. In particular, if the robbery had been planned in the Beehive Hotel earlier in the evening then it might have been reasonable to consider that the conversation would have addressed the need or intention to cut the phone wires and whether anyone had a tool that they could be cut with. Nor is the cutting of the telephone wires detailed in Northam's subsequent conversation in the following days with George Kelly when he allegedly explained what happened. The omission of this fact that only the murderer would have known and which was either not reported in the newspapers or only reported in the most extensive coverage, being a significant part of the robbery that would have taken time, of which there were only a few minutes from start to finish, undermines the veracity of Northam, Dickson and Graham's subsequent accounts of George Kelly's alleged confessions. According to Skelly’s book, The Cameo Conspiracy, Balmer tried to cover this aspect by having Northam and Dickson state Kelly also produced a pair of pliers in the Beehive. But he was told by more senior officers, that this was too far fetched, would be “over egging the pudding” and to drop it. Thus it never appeared in any of their further changed statements.

=== 2 February 1949 Cameo Cinema break in ===
Little is made of the break in at the Cameo Cinema on 2 February 1949 for which three youths were arrested and charged on 2 April 1949. During the break in they had gone into the manager's office, where Leonard Thomas and John Catterall were later shot and tried forcing cupboards. They took cigarettes, chocolate and 10 shillings in cash, but would no doubt have familiarised themselves with the office layout and seen the safe. Whilst there is nothing connecting them with the murder, there was nothing connecting Charles Connolly or George Kelly with the murder either other than false statements and circumstantial behaviour.

== Re-trial ==
Kelly was tried first and, despite a spirited defence by Rose Heilbron KC, he was found guilty and sentenced to death. The judge was Mr. Justice Cassels. Connolly was then offered the chance to plead guilty to conspiracy and being an accessory. Faced with the almost certainty that he would otherwise be convicted of murder and share the fate of his co-accused if he refused, he had little choice other than to accept the offer and plead accordingly. Contrary to popular belief, Connolly did not turn King's Evidence but simply pleaded guilty to the charges laid before him. His plea however, destroyed Kelly's assertions of his own innocence and despite an appeal against his conviction, Kelly was executed at Walton Prison, Liverpool by Albert Pierrepoint and his assistant Harry Allen on 28 March 1950. He continued to assert his innocence, even on the scaffold. Connolly was released from prison in 1957 and died in 1997. Shortly before his death, he took part in an interview on BBC Radio Merseyside, during which he reaffirmed both his and Kelly's innocence.

Mr. Justice Cassels was the judge at the second trial. After the convictions were handed down he commended Northam and Dickson and awarded them £30 each for their selfless role in the case and also commended Graham although he could not reward him directly under his powers. Cassels said 'but for their evidence, George Kelly and Charles Connolly, two dangerous criminals might never had been brought to justice. Whatever their previous faults might have been, they, by their actions in the case, and at the risk to their personal safety, had rendered a service to the community'.

== Controversy ==
The case caused considerable disquiet in legal circles for many years and there were a number of attempts to have it re-opened. The evidence put forward by the prosecution had emanated from witnesses who could hardly be described as being of sterling character. Dickson was a convicted prostitute and thief who, two years after the Cameo trial, was sentenced with others to a lengthy prison term for the violent robberies of a number of her clients. Northam had been a criminal since the age of 14 and had spent much of the 1940s in and out of prison. Graham shared a similar background. All three stood to gain by their testimony. The detective who led the investigation, Detective Chief Inspector Herbert Balmer, had difficulty in corroborating much of the prosecution evidence during the trial and many prosecution witness statements bore the sign of police coaching. Employer's timesheets, which detailed Connolly's movements on the day of the murder, had been amateurishly tampered with. Witness statements that favoured the accused men were held back by the police, a fact later discovered by a local businessman, Luigi Santangeli, who set out to investigate the crime on behalf of Connolly in the 1990s and was given access to the case files by Merseyside Police.

=== Donald Johnson ===
Most importantly, scant attention was paid to the fact that another Liverpool criminal, Donald Johnson, had demonstrated an intimate knowledge of the crime after being arrested for a street robbery in Birkenhead and had been charged with complicity in the murders prior to the arrests of Kelly and Connolly. Johnson had been transferred to Walton Prison from Birkenhead, where he allegedly admitted to another prisoner that he had been involved in the cinema shootings. This other prisoner was Robert Graham, the same witness who would later tell the court that Connolly and Kelly had confessed to being the murderers. During questioning, Johnson admitted being in the vicinity of the cinema at the time of the murders and had been stopped by a police constable, suspicious of his loitering, who had demanded to see his identity card and then taken his name. Johnson, during police interrogation, referred to the murder weapon as being an automatic, a fact which the police had not made known to the public. He further stated that one of the dead men had been shot whilst on his hands and knees, another fact which had been held back by the police. Johnson also told police that he knew the identity of the gunman, but had taken a religious oath not to reveal his name.

Because Johnson's entire statement was ruled inadmissible, after the presiding judge decided that the police had obtained it by threats and inducement, an attempt to try him as an accessory failed and he was freed. Liverpool City Police were then left in the position of having lost their most likely suspect - who could not be even questioned about the case again. Given the magnitude of the crime, reputations and careers would no doubt have been in jeopardy and the investigation team were in desperate need of fresh suspects. Donald Johnson later claimed that he had lied about what he knew of the shooting in the hope that he could get the police to dismiss his Birkenhead offence. Confessing to even peripheral involvement in a brutal double murder however, simply to have a mere mugging charge dismissed, would seem an unlikely course of action for an experienced criminal like Johnson to take and he clearly had a detailed knowledge of what had occurred in the cinema office. There has been speculation in the years since that a close relative of Johnson's may have been the gunman and that was the reason he refused to name him to the police. Johnson died in 1988. Eventually the case reached the Court of Appeal in February 2001 and in June 2003 Kelly's and Connolly's convictions were judged to be unsafe and were duly quashed. Kelly's remains were taken from their burial place in Walton prison by his family and he was reburied after a service in Liverpool Metropolitan Cathedral.

== Related case ==
Two years after the execution, Chief Superintendent Balmer was investigating the murder of Beatrice Rimmer in Cranborne Road, just a few hundred yards from the Cameo cinema. He was again claiming that two young men, this time from Manchester, Alfred Burns and Edward Devlin, were responsible for the crime. Their convictions were argued to be unsafe in a book, Murderers Or Martyrs, again by George Skelly, with a foreword by former UK Attorney General Lord Goldsmith QC; Skelly demonstrated in detail how Balmer may have framed the two men in an identical scenario to that used by him to frame Kelly and Connolly two years earlier. The possibility that Balmer did frame the two men is more tenuous than in the Cameo case and may explain why Skelly's submission to the Criminal Cases Review Commission, involving new argument and eleven bundles of previously undisclosed evidence, was rejected. The CCRC however failed to investigate further an 81 year-old alibi witness's affidavit and signed, verifiable statement, stating he was present with Devlin and Burns, at the warehouse robbery in Manchester on the murder night. Luigi Santangeli, the man responsible for the Appeal Court’s exoneration of the Cameo case accused, publicly commented that Skelly had submitted a more powerful case than himself in that successful appeal.
