= Murder of Vera Page =

1931 child murder in London, England

Vera Page
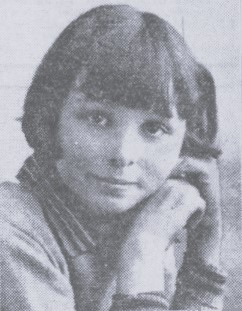
- Vera Page, pictured in April 1931
- Born: 13 April 1921; Hammersmith, London, England
- Died: 14 December 1931 (aged 10); Kensington, London, England
- Cause of death: Manual strangulation
- Body discovered: 89 Addison Road, Kensington, 16 December 1931 51.50292°N 0.20959°W (approximate)
- Resting place: Gunnersbury Cemetery, Hounslow, London, England; 51.4946°N 0.2848°W (approximate)
- Education: Lancaster Road School, Notting Hill
- Occupation: Student
- Known for: Unsolved murder victim
- Parent(s): Charles and Isabel Page

Vera Isobel Minnie Page (13 April 1921 - 14 December 1931) was a British schoolgirl and the victim of an unsolved child murder case from the early 1930s.

Page was reported missing after she failed to return to her home in Notting Hill, London, from a visit to a nearby relative on 14 December 1931; her body was found two days later in undergrowth in nearby Addison Road. She had been raped, then manually strangled to death in a murder described by one detective as "the most terrible in which I had to deal with during my career".

Strong circumstantial evidence existed attesting to the guilt of a local labourer named Percy Orlando Rush, whose parents lived in the same house as Vera and who was casually acquainted with the Page family. However, an investigative procedural flaw is believed to have enabled Rush to dispose of crucial physical evidence prior to a formal police search of his home. As such, at the subsequent coroner's inquest into Vera's death, the coroner's jury determined that insufficient real evidence existed to formally charge Rush with her murder.

No individual was ever brought to trial for Vera's murder. Officially, the case remains unsolved.

== Early life ==
Vera Isobel Minnie Page was born on 13 April 1921 in Hammersmith, London, the only child born to Charles William and Isabel (née Essex) Page. The Page family were working-class, and resided in Chapel Road, Notting Hill (now known as St. Marks Place) throughout much of Vera's childhood. At the time of Vera's birth, her father was employed as a gas fitter, but later became a painter with Great Western Railways; her mother was a housewife. Vera has been described as a popular and friendly, yet shy and well-behaved girl.

To supplement the family income, Charles and Isabel occasionally allowed lodgers to reside in their home, although these lodgers were always either family members or individuals known to the family. In January 1931, the family moved from Chapel Road to a three-storey house in nearby Blenheim Crescent. The family did not occupy the whole house, but rooms on both the ground floor and basement. Other occupants who resided on the upper floors of this property included a middle-aged couple named Arthur and Annie (née Gardner) Rush, who had lived within the property for approximately twenty years.

Vera, pictured with her mother and father in the summer of 1931

=== Disappearance ===
On Monday 14 December 1931, Vera left her home at 22 Blenheim Crescent at 4:30 p.m. to walk approximately fifty yards to the home of her aunt, Minnie Essex, who lived at number 70 Blenheim Crescent. The purpose of this short journey was to collect two swimming certificates she had been awarded but had left with her aunt the previous day. Prior to leaving, Vera informed her mother she would soon return home as she was hungry and looking forward to her evening meal. She was wearing a distinctive red beret.

Vera's aunt would later inform investigators her niece had stayed at her home for "about ten minutes" before returning home, adding "the street lamps" had not yet illuminated.

== Initial inquiries ==
When Vera had not returned home by 5:30 p.m., her father paid a visit to her aunt, who informed him Vera had collected her swimming certificates and then left her home at approximately 4:45 p.m., intending to return home in time for her evening meal. Having first visited the homes of all of Vera's friends and relatives in the hope his daughter might be with an acquaintance, Charles Page visited Notting Hill police station to report Vera as missing at 10:25 p.m. Assisted by several friends and neighbours, Vera's parents continued their search for her throughout the evening and into the morning. The following day, the child's physical description was circulated among local police and by the evening of 15 December, local media had been notified of her disappearance, with several wireless stations broadcasting appeals for information as to her whereabouts and welfare.

Via extensive inquiries, investigators determined that minutes prior to 5 p.m. on 14 December, Vera had spoken with a school friend named Irene Steerman as she (Vera) had stood outside a chemist's located at the junction of Blenheim Crescent and Portobello Road, and that Vera had informed her friend of her intention to purchase soap dominoes on prominent display behind the window as a Christmas present for her parents. Steerman noted Vera had been carrying a large white envelope in her hand, which her aunt confirmed to investigators had contained her swimming certificates. Shortly after this brief conversation, Steerman left Vera standing in front of the chemist's window.

"The moment I stepped into the garden, I saw the body. The child was lying on her right side, and the lapel of her coat almost covered her face ... she looked as if she was lying asleep under the bushes, except that her face was like marble. I told the cook at the house, and then went out and found a policeman."

— Joseph Smith. Milkman performing his round on Addison Road, recollecting his discovery of the body of Vera Page. December 1931.

No other verifiable sightings of the child—alone or in the company of any other individual—could be established after this time. (Note: One individual did state to investigators that at approximately 6:45 p.m. on 14 December, he had seen a girl he believed to be Vera walking along Montpelier Road in the direction of Lansdowne Crescent. This man—a former neighbour of the Page family—was able to accurately describe Vera's clothing, adding the fact she had been "swinging" her red beret in her hand.) A subsequent autopsy would reveal Vera's murder occurred shortly after Steerman had last seen her alive, with investigators theorizing she had most likely encountered her murderer in the vicinity of the chemist's shop.

=== Discovery ===
At approximately 9:31 on the morning of 16 December, a milkman named Joseph Smith discovered Vera's body lying in a patch of shrubbery in the front garden of 89 Addison Road, Kensington, close to Holland Park. The location was approximately one mile from her home.

The perpetrator had made no serious effort to conceal Vera's body, beyond making a brief and rudimentary effort to throw handfuls of earth and leaves upon her remains. This fact led investigators to speculate Vera had likely been murdered close to the location of the discovery of her body, and that the perpetrator either lived locally or held extensive geographical knowledge of the neighbourhood. Furthermore, a worn section of ammonia-stained finger bandage also composing of lint and bearing traces of coal dust was discovered to be lodged firmly against the inner elbow of her right arm; this evidence was only discovered when Vera's body was moved from the crime scene to the mortuary.

Approximately forty hours had elapsed between the time Vera had last been seen alive and the discovery of her remains, yet her body was not rigid, and decomposition was relatively advanced, thus suggesting her body had been stored in a fairly warm environment between the time she had last been seen alive and the discovery of her body. Moreover, it had rained heavily from 3 p.m. to 9 p.m. the previous day, and the weather was still generally moist and misty, yet Vera's clothing had absorbed very little moisture, and solely in locations where her body had touched the soil at the location of her discovery, leading investigators to opine that the child's body could not have lain in the location where she was discovered for more than two hours. This opinion was corroborated by both an occupant of the house who informed investigators that had the body been in the patch of shrubbery before 7:50 a.m., she could not have failed to notice it, and the milkman who discovered the body and who had made his routine delivery to the home at 5:30 a.m., who was also adamant that the body was not lying in this location upon his first visit to the premises. (Note: This occupant of 89 Addison Road would inform investigators she had left her home at approximately 7:50 a.m. on 16 December, and had seen nothing untoward in her front garden.)

== Autopsy ==
Vera's body was examined by pathologist Sir Bernard Spilsbury, who concluded that she had been raped, then manually strangled to death, and that the child had been deceased for in excess of twenty-four hours prior to the discovery of her body. Her underwear had been torn, and deep impressions of one finger and one thumb—both slightly bloodied—were evident upon the child's neck. Her body also bore superficial bruising and a welt mark also located upon her neck had been inflicted via a ligature, although this injury had evidently occurred after death and may have been inflicted by her murderer while dragging her body to a place of concealment. The advanced state of decomposition given the time lapse between Vera's disappearance and discovery and the cold seasonal climate led Spilsbury to conclude her body had lain in a warm environment for most of the time her body had been undiscovered.

Spilsbury also discovered traces of soot and coal dust on Vera's face, plus spattered candle wax in two locations around her right shoulder and three locations on the shoulder of her coat. The candle wax itself was subsequently discovered to be of a different consistency to all candles within Vera's own home.

The consistency of the candle wax discovered on Vera's clothing, plus the evident coal dust, led Spilsbury to the conclusion that the girl's body had likely been hidden in either a coal shed or cellar prior to her body being discarded at Addison Road, and that this shed or cellar most likely had no electric light. Furthermore, Spilsbury concurred with the initial police conclusion that the section of ammonia-stained finger bandage found lodged against Vera's inner elbow had likely been dislodged from the left hand of her murderer as he had deposited her body at the crime scene.

Investigators converge in the garden of 89 Addison Road following the discovery of the body of Vera Page

=== Investigation ===
The rape and murder of Vera Page caused extensive public indignation and police mounted an intensive operation to apprehend her murderer. The individual in charge of the investigation was Superintendent George Cornish.

Over 200 police officers and detectives were assigned to the manhunt to apprehend the perpetrator; these efforts saw extensive door-to-door public inquiries conducted throughout the vicinity of Vera's disappearance and discovery and exhaustive media appeals to the public for information. Over 1,000 people would be formally questioned in relation to the murder, and several thousand witness statements obtained by police throughout their inquiries.

As Vera was a friendly but shy and wary child, investigators theorized she had likely been abducted and murdered by an individual she had known and trusted, and that this individual had lured her either to a warm room or into a car where he had proceeded to rape and murder her before stowing her body in either a coal cellar or a garage—as indicated by the extensive coal dust upon her clothes. This individual had subsequently retrieved Vera's body from the location of her concealment at or shortly before dawn on 16 December and proceeded to transport her body to Addison Road via either a wheelbarrow or a perambulator, inadvertently dislodging the finger bandage from his left hand as he removed his hands from beneath the child's arms as he had lifted, then discarded her body from the wheelbarrow or perambulator in the garden of 89 Addison Road. This theory soon bore fruit as on 17 December, a Mrs. Margaret Key informed investigators that at approximately 6:40 a.m. on 16 December, she had observed an individual whose physical appearance fitted that of a local man named Percy Orlando Rush pushing a costermonger's barrow laden with a large bundle covered with a distinctive red table-cloth with a knitted fringe walking in the direction of Addison Road.

On 17 December, a woman living close to Addison Road named Kathleen Short brought a child's red beret to the Notting Hill police station, stating she had found the rain-soaked item at approximately 9:30 on the evening of 15 December at a location investigators noted was quite close to where Vera had last been seen alive. This beret was identified by Vera's parents as belonging to their daughter, and was noted to smell of paraffin (although this odour may have been caused by Short initially storing the beret beneath a sink in her scullery). Short also informed investigators that close to the scene of her discovery, she had also located several sections of torn paper which she had collected and discarded, and a section of candle which she had herself used and then also discarded. (Note: The sections of torn paper collected and disposed of by Kathleen Short are suspected to have been the remnants of the swimming certificates Vera had collected from the home of her aunt Minnie. These swimming certificates were never located.) By 21 December, police inquiries had also produced an eyewitness who stated that on the morning of the discovery of Vera's body, the door to a coal shed close to Addison Road had been left unlocked and ajar, when on all other dates it would invariably have been closed and locked.

The entrance to the coal cellar in which Vera Page is believed to have been murdered

The coal cellar in question was located beneath a block of flats close to the house on Addison Road where Vera's body was discovered and had no electric light source, giving credibility to Spilsbury's theory that the child had been murdered and/or her body hidden in a basement or coal cellar with no electric light, and that her murderer had likely illuminated the scene via candlelight. Investigators gave strong support to the theory that the Vera's body had been temporarily concealed in this cellar after her murder, then transported via wheelbarrow to the location of her subsequent discovery—most likely by the individual observed by Margaret Key less than three hours before the discovery of her body.

==== Prime suspect ====
Percy Orlando Rush was a 40-year-old married man who lived close to Blenheim Crescent and who had worked as a flannel washer and labourer in a launderette in Earl's Court for two years. Rush's parents lived on the upper floors of 22 Blenheim Crescent, and he and his wife—whom he had married in 1921—had lived in the premises until 1925, although after their relocation to nearby Talbot Road, he had continued to regularly visit his parents, having a key to their home.

Rush's parents had married in 1891—the same year as his birth. He had been the first of their four children and, according to census records, the only one of their children to still live with his parents at Blenheim Crescent by 1921. A veteran of the First World War, Rush had married a woman one year his senior named Daisy Lilian Wheeley in 1921; the couple—whose marriage remained childless—remained frequent visitors to Rush's parents' home, with Mondays being one of the weekdays they would typically visit.

Rush, c. 1916

Rush freely admitted to having known Vera—whom he described as "a nice little girl"—for approximately one year, although he claimed to have not seen her for approximately three weeks before her disappearance. He further admitted his travel route to and from work required him to walk along Blenheim Crescent on weekdays and that via his occupation, he had come into contact with ammonia on an almost daily basis. Furthermore, Rush admitted to having severely injured the little finger on his left hand in his workplace less than a week before Vera's murder, and to have regularly treated the wound with both bandages and iodine since. The wound itself was observed by a policeman to be tender in appearance and still requiring attention at the time of Rush's initial, informal questioning.

== Formal questioning ==
Despite his protestations of innocence, Rush quickly became the prime suspect in Vera's murder. He was initially questioned at Notting Hill police station on 18 December, where he freely admitted to having worn a finger bandage since injuring the little finger of his left hand while working with a washing machine at his workplace approximately one week previously. According to Rush, after injuring his finger at work in early December he and his colleagues had made a rough bandage for the wound from cloth material, although his wife had made a more compact and comfortable bandage for him from their domestic supply of bandages that same evening so that the ammonia he came into contact with via his work did not aggravate the wound. Furthermore, she had prepared two further such bandages for this wound over the following days.

Rush claimed to have disposed of the third and final section of bandage prepared by his wife in his fireplace on the evening of 12 December. He remained adamant he had not worn any form of bandage upon his finger since this date, explaining to investigators he had simply wished to "harden the wound". Furthermore, Rush freely admitted to having visited his parents' Blenheim Crescent residence on an almost weekly basis, and to have known Vera, although he remained adamant he had not seen the child for "about three weeks" prior to her murder. He further explained the discovery of coal dust upon his clothing as sourcing from frequently carrying coal into his house.

Some of Rush's claims regarding his finger bandage were confirmed by his work colleagues, who informed investigators Rush had indeed injured the little finger of his left hand on 9 December, and had returned to work the next day wearing a homemade bandage to protect the wound against ammoniated water. Nonetheless, his colleagues were uncertain as to whether he had been wearing a bandage on 14 December.

=== Forensic developments ===
A police search of Rush's Talbot Road home uncovered bandages, plus a distinctive red table-cloth with a knitted fringe markedly similar to the one observed by Margaret Key evidently used to cover Vera's body as her murderer had transported her remains to the garden of 89 Addison Road. A forensic examination of the consistency of candle wax discovered upon Vera's right shoulder and to wax spattering discovered upon Rush's own overcoat revealed the substance to be identical to that of a used candle recovered from Rush's home. (Note: Via a then-pioneering method of temperature control, investigators conclusively determined that the spots of wax discovered upon both Vera's body and the overcoat of Percy Rush were a precise match to the temperature consistency of a partly-used candle discovered in Rush's home.) Furthermore, this overcoat was found to contain traces of coal dust and semen. However, although the finger bandage recovered from the crime scene was found to be a perfect fit upon Rush's injured finger, to have been used to conceal a suppurating wound and to have been soaked in ammonia on at least one occasion, Home Office analyst Dr. Roche Lynch—having examined this bandage with the assistance of ultra violet light—concluded that the material was of a different consistency to all bandage and lint samples recovered by investigators during their search of Rush's home.

== Coroner's inquest ==
The coroner's inquest into Vera Page's murder was opened at the Coroner's Court in, Paddington, London, on 10 February 1932. The hearings were held before Dr. Samuel Ingleby Oddie, who opened the proceedings by stating to the coroner's jury: "The police have, with the greatest industry, interviewed almost everybody who knew little Vera or whom she was likely to know. They have taken actually more than 1,000 statements and the whole district has been gone through with a small tooth-comb. Out of all the people from whom they have taken statements, there is only one who knew her and whom she knew who was, at the time of the murder, said to have been wearing a finger-stall on his left hand ... This man, whose name is Percy Orlando Rush, had a wound on his left finger and was wearing a finger-stall ... he worked with ammonia. Statements have been taken from Rush, and he will be called before you and may satisfy you that the fact he was wearing a finger-stall about the time this girl disappeared was a mere coincidence. That is for you to decide."

=== Rush's testimony ===
One of the final individuals to provide evidence the opening day of the proceedings was Rush himself, who stated he was "quite satisfied [he was] doing right" in testifying in his own defence. Though his movements on the date of the murder were never independently corroborated at the inquest, Rush claimed that on the evening of the murder, he had finished work at 6:15 p.m. and had walked home. As his wife, Daisy, had been visiting her mother, he had opted to go shopping for collar studs in Kensington Road as he did not wish to be alone in the family home. He claimed to have returned home at approximately 8:30 p.m., that his wife had returned home shortly thereafter, and that the two had gone to sleep at approximately 10:15 p.m. Rush further claimed to have not visited his parents on Monday 14 December, although he did admit that he had typically visited his parents on a Monday evening. (Note: No individual was called upon at the coroner's inquest to verify Rush's statements as to his movements on 14 December or the days immediately thereafter.)

In response to specific allegations from the coroner that he had intentionally lured Vera to the coal shed close to Addison Road where he had then proceeded to rape, then strangle the child before later discarding her body in the front garden of 89 Addison Road, Rush became emphatic in his denials, claiming not to have known Vera as well as his initial witness statement to police had suggested and claiming to have only ever spoken to the child once. He then refused to answer a question as to why his claim to have been able to recognize a newspaper photograph of Vera shown to him by his wife following her murder contradicted his claim not to have known her.

Rush was then questioned about the injury to the finger of his left hand he had sustained on 9 December and his having worn a finger bandage in the days immediately following. He admitted to having worn a finger bandage, primarily to protect the wound from ammonia, but remained adamant he had ceased dressing the wound with bandage after approximately two days, stating: "I intended to get the finger hardened by letting air get to it"—adding he did not care about the possibility of ammonia coming into contact with the wound causing him pain. Dr. Oddie then responded with the question, "Did you know the bandage (discovered upon Vera's body) smelled of ammonia?" In response, Rush smiled—prompting a rebuke from Oddie—before denying the bandage was his. Minutes later, Rush raised a copy of the New Testament before swearing he had not encountered Vera on the date of her murder.

Although Rush did occasionally contradict himself throughout his testimony—particularly when questioned as to his recognizing Vera and his previous social interactions with her—no specific eyewitness accounts existed to place Rush in Vera's company on the day of her death, and extensive police inquiries at every chemist's shop in West London had failed to produce any individual who could recall having sold bandages of the type discovered upon Vera's body to Rush or his wife. Furthermore, the coal shed in which police alleged Vera had likely been murdered and/or her body stored before being disposed of at Addison Road had been vacated five days before her murder. (The coal shed's previous owner, Thomas O'Connor, testified at the inquest that he had taken the door's padlock with him.)

=== Summation ===
The coroner's inquest into Vera's murder lasted eight hours, and saw 113 exhibits presented before the coroner's jury. On the afternoon of 10 February, Dr. Oddie delivered his summation to the jury. Oddie explained to the jury that the case outlined against Rush at the inquest had amounted to his being "suspected for various reasons" before outlining the strong circumstantial evidence against him, but also the lack of any physical evidence directly linking him to the crime. He concluded his summation by instructing the jury: "You must not record a verdict against Rush unless you are satisfied beyond all reasonable doubt that these various points of evidence which seem to indicate that he was the guilty man form a chain of circumstantial evidence so strong that you are forced to come to the conclusion that he was the man ... If you are not satisfied that the circumstantial evidence is sufficiently strong to fix the guilt upon Rush, you must return an open verdict. The chain of evidence must be complete."

==== Acquittal ====
After just five minutes of deliberation, the coroner's jury determined that insufficient evidence existed to formally charge Rush with Vera's murder and returned a formal verdict of murder by person or persons unknown while extending their collective sympathy to Vera's parents. In response to this verdict, Vera's mother burst into tears and was led from the courtroom by several friends—many of whom were also weeping—as other women in the gallery openly booed and shook their fists at Rush, vocally declaring him to be a blatant liar.

Rush shook hands with several supporters before leaving the courtroom in the company of his wife, who had remained steadfast in her belief of his innocence.

Members of the public pay their respects as Vera Page's body is driven to Gunnersbury Cemetery, 23 December 1931

== Aftermath ==
Vera Page was laid to rest in Gunnersbury Cemetery on the afternoon of 23 December 1931. Her internment followed a 2 p.m. service within Notting Hill's Presbyterian Mission Hall in accordance with her Protestant faith, and where Vera had attend Sunday school. The service was attended by over 100 mourners, including several of her fellow Sunday school classmates. Two hymns were sung by the congregation, and over 1,000 members of the public stood in silence to mark their respects as the funeral cortège proceeded from the chapel to the cemetery.

Two weeks after Rush's acquittal, the Sunday Dispatch published a front-page article offering a reward of £1,000 (the equivalent of approximately £62,300 as of 2026) for any public information directly supplied via their appeal leading to the arrest and conviction of Vera's murderer. This appeal proved unsuccessful.

No individual was ever charged with the murder of Vera Page. Percy Rush himself died of natural causes in Ealing in November 1961 at the age of 70.

Undisclosed to the jury at the coroner's inquest into Vera's murder was the fact that Rush had previously been found guilty of indecent exposure in 1923 and 1927, receiving a month in prison on each occasion. Furthermore, in June 1931 he had exposed himself to two young girls.

Several decades after all charges against Rush were dismissed due to lack of evidence, Superintendent George Cornish would state that during the initial police interrogation of Rush when he had simply been one of several potential suspects, officers had informed him of the finger bandage found at the crime scene. These officers had then requested Rush voluntarily hand over all samples of bandages within his home for comparison with the finger bandage, and he had complied with what Cornish later described as a disturbing "faint smile" upon his face. Shortly thereafter, the Metropolitan Police conducted a formal search of his home. Superintendent Cornish later confirmed that this procedural error had been a crucial mistake which had likely allowed Rush to dispose of any bandage of the type he had worn on the day of Vera's murder and ultimately result in insufficient real evidence existing to formally charge him with the crime.

== See also ==
- Burden of proof (law) – Obligation on a party to prove their case
- Capital punishment in the United Kingdom
- Child abduction – Unauthorized removal of a minor
- Child sexual abuse – Form of child abuse
- Cold case – Unsolved crime not now being investigated
- Forensic science – Application of science to law and investigation
- List of solved missing person cases (pre-1950)
- List of unsolved murders in the United Kingdom (before 1970)

== Cited works and further reading ==
- Bondeson, Jan (2014). Murder Houses of London. Gloucestershire: Amberley Publishing. ISBN 978-1-445-61485-4.
- Browne, Douglas Gordon; Tullett, Tom (1989). Bernard Spilsbury: His Life and Cases. Dorchester: Dorset Press. ISBN 978-0-856-17216-8.
- Butler, Ivan (1973). Murderers' England. London: Robert Hale Publishers. ISBN 978-0-709-14054-2.
- Canning, John (1992). Unsolved Murders and Mysteries. London: Little, Brown Book Group Limited. ISBN 978-0-751-50896-3.
- Cornish, George W. (1935). Cornish of Scotland Yard, His Reminiscences and Cases. London: Macmillan Publishers. ASIN B0006AMUUM.
- Davis, Mick (2026). Notting Hill and North Kensington Murders and Misdemeanours. Gloucestershire: Amberley Publishing. ISBN 978-1-398-13408-9.
- Fido, Martin (1995). Twentieth Century Murder: A Year by Year Account of the World's Most Pitiless Crimes. London: Bracken Books. ISBN 978-0-140-01775-5.
- Finn, Pat (2017). Unsolved 1931: A List of Unsolved Murders from 1931. Amazon. ISBN 978-1-978-15469-8.
- Gaute, J. H. H. (1991). The New Murderers' Who's Who. Dorchester: Dorset Press. ISBN 978-0-880-29582-6.
- Lane, Brian (1991). The Murder Guide to Great Britain. London: Robinson Publishing Ltd. ISBN 1-854-87083-1.
- Nash, Jay Robert (1983). Open Files: A Narrative Encyclopedia of the World's Greatest Unsolved Crimes. London: The Rowman & Littlefield Publishing Group, Inc. ISBN 978-0-070-45907-6.
- Nicholls, Ernest (1935). Crime Within the Square Mile: The History of Crime in the City of London. London: John Long Ltd. ASIN B00087RSPU.
- Oates, Jonathan (2009). Unsolved London Murders: The 1920s and 1930s. Barnsley: Wharncliffe Books Ltd. ISBN 978-1-845-63075-1.
- Oates, Jonathan (2011). Tracing Your London Ancestors: A Guide for Family Historians. Barnsley: Pen & Sword. ISBN 978-1-844-68686-5.
- Rhodes, Henry Taylor Fowkes (1993) [1952]. In the Tracks of Crime. Florida: Turnstile Press. ISBN 978-0-851-72211-5.
- Scott-Davies, Alan (2011). Death on the Waterways. Cheltenham: History Press. ISBN 978-0-752-47268-3.
- Thorwald, Jürgen; Winston, Richard (1969). Crime and Science: The New Frontier in Criminology. San Diego: Harcourt Publishing. ISBN 978-0-156-23050-6.
- Whittington-Egan, Richard; Whittington-Egan, Molly (1992). The Murder Almanac. Glasgow: Neil Wilson Publishing. ISBN 1-897784-04-X.
- Whittington-Egan, Richard (2006). Murder Files. London: Constable & Robinson Limited. ISBN 978-1-845-29435-9.
- Wilson, Colin; Pitman, Patricia (1984) [1962]. Encyclopedia of Murder. New York City: G. P. Putnam's Sons. ISBN 978-0-330-2830-07.
- Wilson, Colin (1992). Murder in the 1930s. New York: Caroll & Graf. ISBN 978-0-881-84855-7.
- Wilson, Colin (1995). Written in Blood: A History of Forensic Detection. Glasgow: HarperCollins. ISBN 978-0-58620-842-7.
