= The Wars of the Roses (adaptation) =

1963 Shakespeare theatrical adaptation

Cover of the play script published in 1970.

The Wars of the Roses was a 1963 theatrical adaptation of William Shakespeare's first historical tetralogy (1 Henry VI, 2 Henry VI, 3 Henry VI and Richard III), which deals with the conflict between the House of Lancaster and the House of York over the throne of England, a conflict known as the Wars of the Roses. The plays were adapted by John Barton, and directed by Barton and Peter Hall at the Royal Shakespeare Theatre. The production starred David Warner as Henry VI, Peggy Ashcroft as Margaret of Anjou, Donald Sinden as the Duke of York, Paul Hardwick as the Duke of Gloucester, Janet Suzman as Joan la Pucelle, Brewster Mason as the Earl of Warwick, Roy Dotrice as Edward IV, Susan Engel as Queen Elizabeth and Ian Holm as Richard III.

The plays were heavily politicised, with Barton and Hall allowing numerous contemporaneous events of the early 1960s to inform their adaptation. The production was a huge critical and commercial success, and is generally regarded as revitalizing the reputation of the Henry VI plays in the modern theatre. Many critics feel The Wars of the Roses set a standard for future productions of the tetralogy which has yet to be surpassed. In 1965, the BBC adapted the plays for television. The broadcast was so successful that they were shown again, in a differently edited form, in 1966. In 1970, BBC Books published the play scripts along with extensive behind-the-scenes information written by Barton and Hall, and other members of the Royal Shakespeare Company who worked on the production.

== Theatrical ==
=== Rewriting ===
The most significant initial alteration to the original text was to conflate the four plays into a trilogy. This was not unprecedented, as adaptations from the seventeenth century onwards had employed truncation when staging the sequence, especially the Henry VI trilogy. In 1681, John Crowne adapted 2 Henry VI and 3 Henry VI into a two-part play called Henry the Sixth, The First Part and The Misery of Civil War. Henry the Sixth comprised Acts 1–3 of 2 Henry VI, with material added by Crowne himself, focusing mainly on the death of Gloucester, whilst Misery adapted the last two acts of 2 Henry VI and a shortened version of 3 Henry VI. In 1699, Colley Cibber's The Tragical History of King Richard the Third used scenes from 3 Henry VI as a form of prologue to rest of the play, establishing a tradition still in use in filmic adaptations of Richard III (see, for example, James Keane and André Calmettes's 1912 version, Laurence Olivier's 1955 version or Richard Loncraine's 1995 version). In 1723, Theophilus Cibber's King Henry VI: A Tragedy used Act 5 of 2 Henry VI and Acts 1 and 2 of 3 Henry VI. In 1817, J.H. Merivale's Richard Duke of York; or the Contention of York and Lancaster used material from all three Henry VI plays, but removed everything not directly related to York. Robert Atkins adapted all three plays into a single piece for a performance at The Old Vic in 1923 as part of the celebrations for the tercentenary of the First Folio. In 1957, also at The Old Vic, Douglas Seale directed a production of the trilogy under the title The Wars of the Roses. Adapted by Barry Jackson, the trilogy was again altered to a two-part play; 1 Henry VI and 2 Henry VI were combined (with almost all of 1 Henry VI eliminated) and 3 Henry VI was performed in a shortened version.

John Barton's adaptation would divide the plays up in a new way. The first play (Henry VI) featured a shortened version of 1 Henry VI and roughly half of 2 Henry VI (up to the death of Cardinal Beaufort). The second play (Edward IV) featured the second half of 2 Henry VI and a shortened version of 3 Henry VI. This was followed by a shortened version of Richard III as the third play. In all, 1,450 lines written by Barton were added to roughly 6,000 lines of original Shakespearean material, with a total of 12,350 lines removed. Barton defended the controversial decision to cut from and add to the text on the grounds that the Henry VI plays "are not viable as they stand," arguing they needed to be adapted "in the interests of audience accessibility." As an example of the alterations, in the original text, the character of the Duke of Exeter appears only in 1 Henry VI, whereas in The Wars of the Roses, he appears throughout all three plays, as a constant ally of Henry VI and the House of Lancaster. Numerous characters were also removed, such as Warwick's father, the Earl of Salisbury, a major character in 2 Henry VI, and some of the battle scenes were amalgamated to cut down on stage combat (such as the First Battle of St Albans and the Battle of Wakefield, which take place in 2 Henry VI and 3 Henry VI, respectively).

In his introduction to the published script of the plays, Peter Hall defended Barton's edits, arguing "there is a difference between interfering with the text of the mature Shakespeare and with the text of the Henry VI's. These plays are not only apprentice work, uneven in quality; we cannot be sure that Shakespeare was their sole author." In tandem with Barton, Hall also argued the plays simply didn't work in unedited form;

I have seen the original versions played twice. Shakespeare's voice is heard sporadically, and his vision, sharp and intense in some scenes, is swamped by the mass of Tudor history in others. All the same, I was doubtful about publishing our version. Our production was perceived with a knowledge of the whole text. If we cut an important passage, we only did so in the conviction that its values were being expressed in other ways. What follows is what we found meaningful in the 1960s in Shakespeare's view of history. Its values are ephemeral, and its judgements are inevitably of the decade which produced it and us.

Although some scholars were highly critical of Barton's edits, others praised them, arguing they improved on the originals. G.K. Hunter, for example, who was critical of the production itself, praised the editing, commenting that Barton was able to "cut away the superfluous fat, tap out the unhealthy fluids, and rescue from the diffuse, stumbling, dropsical giant, a trim, lithe, and with-it figure, sharp and resilient." Frank Cox referred to the plays as "a triumph of scholarship and theatrical awareness," arguing that "by inspired weeding, contradiction, and even in places by brazen invention, he has created from a seldom revived mass of sword-rattling chronicles, a positive addition to the canon of popular works." Robert Speaight argued the additions were so well integrated into the existing material, he was at times unable to distinguish between the original Shakespearean blank verse and Barton's new verse, whilst J.C. Trewin noted that although the changes to the plays represented the most drastic alteration to Shakespeare since the days of the Restoration, the resulting production was of such a consistently high quality that any such changes could be forgiven.

=== Politics ===
In terms of the dramaturgy of the plays, Barton and Hall were both equally concerned they reflect, but not directly refer to, the contemporary political milieu. According to Trevor Nunn, when Hall founded the Royal Shakespeare Company in 1960, he "insisted upon one simple rule: that whenever the Company did a play by Shakespeare, they should do it because the play was relevant, because the play made some demand upon our current attention." This was very much in evidence during the production of The Wars of the Roses. Both Hall and Barton felt the civil chaos and breakdown of society depicted in the plays were mirrored by the contemporary political situation, in events such as the building of the Berlin Wall in 1961, the Cuban Missile Crisis in 1962 and the assassination of John F. Kennedy in 1963. Hall argued that "we live among war, race riots, revolutions, assassinations, and the imminent threat of extinction. The theatre is, therefore, examining fundamentals in staging the Henry VI plays." He also stated that during pre-production, "I realised that the mechanism of power had not changed in centuries. We were in the middle of a blood-soaked century. I was convinced that a presentation of one of the bloodiest and most hypocritical periods in history would teach many lessons about the present." Similarly, in her introduction to the Folio Society edition of the trilogy, Peggy Ashcroft challenged William Hazlitt's dismissal of the Henry VI plays as a depiction of England as a "perfect beargarden", writing "perhaps because we are more aware than ever before what a beargarden the whole world is, we see in these plays a microcosm of so many of the violent and tragic conflicts of our own time. The romantic view of Shakespeare, popular with the Victorians and lasting almost to the first half of this century has now changed, and we have become more aware of Shakespeare's political absorption and inspired interpretations of man's difficulty in governing himself and others."

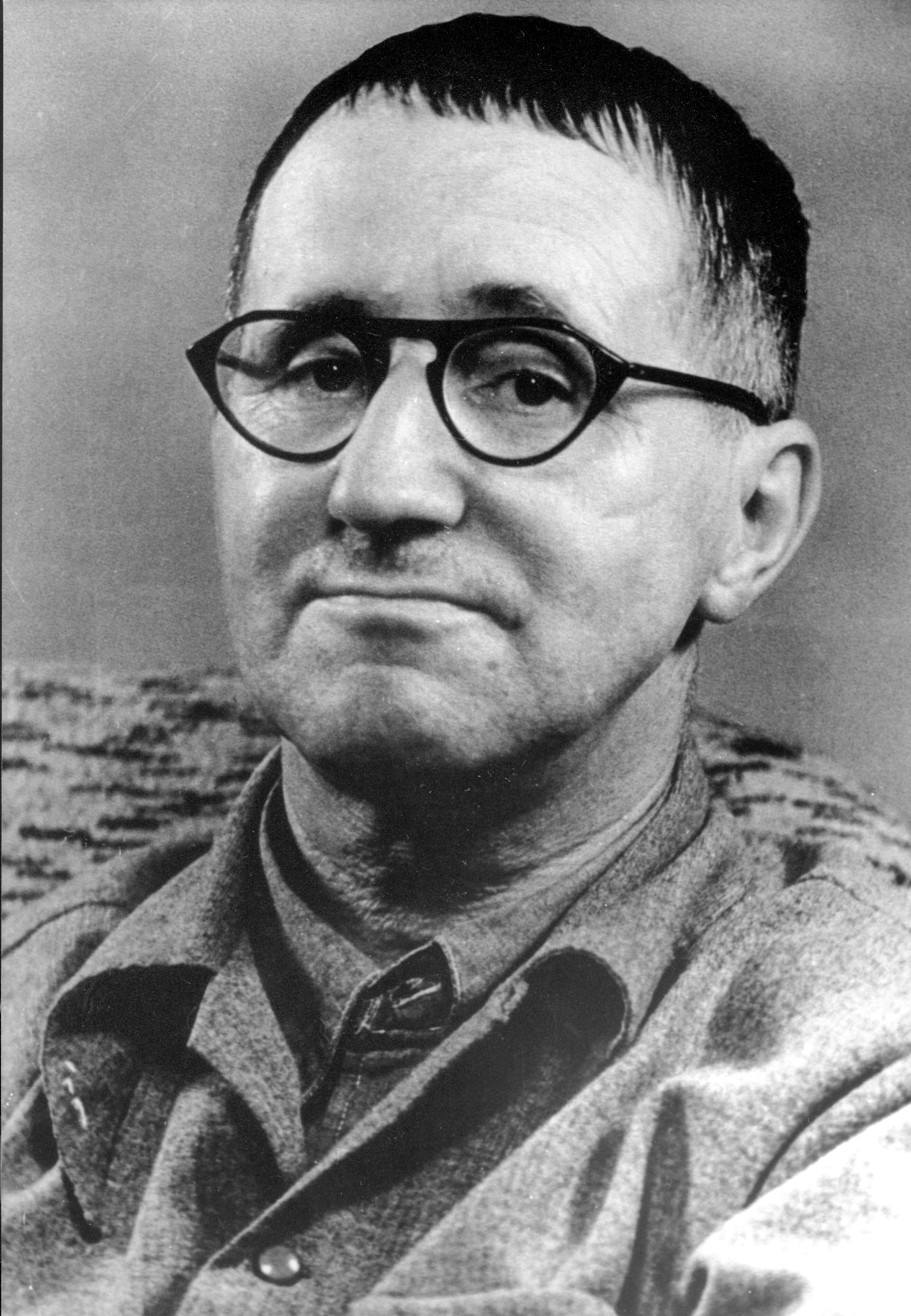
Bertolt Brecht's theories of dramaturgy were especially influential on The Wars of the Roses.

Barton and Hall were also influenced by certain politically focused literary theory of the time; both were subscribers to Antonin Artaud's theory of the "Theatre of Cruelty", and both had attended the 1956 London visit of Bertolt Brecht's Berliner Ensemble. Brecht's influence on The Wars of the Roses was especially pronounced, and many scholars have since cited Brecht's theories on drama in general, and historical drama in specific, as the impetus behind the 'rediscovery' of the Henry VI plays in the 1960s. For example, Ton Hoenselaars argues that Brecht

provided a theatrical language and advanced a method of social analysis which together proved capable of turning Shakespeare's representation of politics in action into compelling drama [...] the impact of Brecht's view of the early histories as representations of the now historically distant decline and fall of medieval feudalism and the rise of the bourgeoisie was obvious [...] one of the major reasons why Brecht could trigger a truly international revival of interest in the neglected Henry VI plays was that by the 1960s, specific national interests were subordinated to supranational class concerns.

Another major influence on the production was Jan Kott. Hall had read a proof copy of Kott's soon-to-be-influential Shakespeare Our Contemporary, prior to its publication in Britain, just before he began rehearsals for The Wars of the Roses. He was strongly taken by Kott's theory regarding Shakespeare's conception of the "Grand Mechanism" of history; as history continually revolves, each claimant to the throne rises, only to be subsequently deposed and crushed in an ongoing cycle. In the programme notes for Henry VI, Barton and Hall included a quotation from Kott, which they felt was especially relevant to their production;

There are two fundamental types of historical tragedy. The first is based on the conviction that history has a meaning, fulfils its objective tasks, and leads in a definite direction. Tragedy here consists in the cost of history, the price of progress that humanity must pay. The tragic figure then is the man out of step. He who hinders or hurries the relentless steamroller of history must also be crushed by it, simply because he comes too soon or too late [...] There is another kind of historical tragedy, originating in the conviction that history has no meaning but stands still, or constantly repeats its cruel cycle; that it is an elemental force, like hail, storm, hurricane, birth and death.

In Shakespeare's histories, the Grand Mechanism is manifested nowhere more clearly than in the rise and fall of Richard III. Kott argued that "Richard is impersonal like history itself. He is the consciousness and mastermind of the Grand Mechanism. He puts in motion the roller of history, and later is crushed by it. Psychology does not apply to him. He is just history, one of its ever-repeating characters. He has no face." This concept of Richard as a faceless personification of the process of a cyclical history became extremely important in Ian Holm's performance. Whilst some critics felt that Holm was physically too slight to play such a 'large' character, this was precisely the point. Holm's Richard is not the dominating larger-than-life presence of the third play as he appears on the page, but is instead a small figure, nurtured by, trapped within and ultimately destroyed by the times that have produced him. Holm himself has stated "I played Richard very much as a cog in the historical wheel, and not as an individual character. We tried very hard to get away from the Olivier/Irving image of the great Machiavellian villain."

Both directors were also supporters of E.M.W. Tillyard's 1944 book Shakespeare's History Plays, which was still a hugely influential text in Shakespearean scholarship, especially in terms of its argument that the tetralogy advanced the Tudor myth or "Elizabethan World Picture"; the theory that Henry VII was a divinely appointed redeemer, sent to rescue England from a century of bloodshed and chaos initiated upon the usurpation and murder of the divinely ordained Richard II, a century which reached its debased and cruel apotheosis in Richard III. According to Hall, "all Shakespeare's thinking, whether religious, political or moral, is based upon a complete acceptance of this concept of order. There is a just proportion in all things: man is above beast, king is above man, and God above king [...] Revolution, whether in the individual's temperament, in the family, or in the state or the heavens, destroys the order and leads to destructive anarchy." Indeed, the programme notes for Henry VI included an article entitled "The Cycle of a Curse," which states that "as Orestes was haunted in Greek drama, so Englishmen fight each other to expunge the curse pronounced upon Bolingbroke's usurpation of the tragically weak Richard II." Similarly, in the notes for Edward IV, Hall wrote, "underlying these plays is the curse on the House of Lancaster. Bolingbroke deposed Richard II to become Henry IV. Richard II was a weak and sometimes a bad king, ungoverned, unbalanced; he could not order the body politic. Yet for Shakespeare, his deposition is a wound on the body politic, which festers through reign after reign, a sin which can only be expiated by blood-letting. The bloody totalitarianism of Richard III is the expiation of England."

John Jowett argues the production very much reinforced the teleological assumptions upon which the Tudor myth is based; "it generated an epic sense of history as a horrific process. Richard's deeds, far from appearing as gratuitous crimes, were the final retributive throes of a sequence of events starting far back in the murder of Richard II." Randall Martin similarly writes "Barton created a compelling dynastic saga about the houses of Lancaster and York, as one falls and the other triumphs – or appears to do so. This emphasis on family history over any single personal story was reinforced by the plays' relationship to the wider cycle, which affiliated individual episodes to an epic structure and teleological interpretation of history." Likewise, Nicholas Grene explains that "as Tillyard saw the history plays, they were the grandly consistent embodiment of the orthodox political and social morality of the Elizabethan period, preaching order and hierarchy, condemning factious power-seeking and the anarchy of civil war to which it led, commending the divinely sanctioned centralised monarchy of the Tudors. Barton and Hall worked to homogenise, to accentuate and underline the orthodoxy postulated by Tillyard."

=== Production ===
However, although the political sphere was very much to the fore in the thematic foundations of the production, unlike many other politically minded productions of the tetralogy (such as, for example, Michael Bogdanov's production of both historical tetralogies for the English Shakespeare Company in 1987), modern parallels were not brought out in the actual performance. Barton and Hall were insistent there be no direct references to contemporary events in the production itself; "instead, contemporary issues were used to help the company explore the political and psychological meanings of the plays." The plays were approached as a collective analysis of power, with the behaviour of unscrupulous politicians contrasted with the political innocence and religious idealism of Henry. As Hall argued, "in theory, he should be a good king. He applies Christian ethics to government. But he is up against men who don't. They justify their behaviour by invoking the great sanctions – God, the King, Parliament, the People – that unscrupulous statesmen, motivated by the naked desire to be on top, have used throughout the ages. Here is the central irony of the play: Henry's Christian goodness produces evil."

In order to capture this sense of innocence, Barton and Hall took what was considered a huge risk by casting an inexperienced twenty-two-year-old actor as Henry, David Warner. The gamble paid off, and Warner's Henry was one of the most celebrated performances in the piece, helping to establish both Warner the actor and Henry the character. Harold Hobson wrote in The Sunday Times that Warner "discovers in Henry one of Shakespeare's greatest parts. The discovery is the more exciting for being improbable, since drama gives its principal opportunities to active men. Henry is never active [...] He suffers only, and endures, never resisting, never striking back [...] Yet [Warner's] sad, distressed face, meeting each new misfortune with an absolute absence of protest or indignation, spreads over the darkest waters of the play a quiet and persistent golden glory." Speaking of Henry's death, in which he gently kisses Richard after being mortally stabbed, The Observer's Kenneth Tynan wrote "I have seen nothing more Christ-like in modern theatre." Writing in the Signet Classics Shakespeare edition of 1 Henry VI in 1967, Lawrence V. Ryan remarked that "unlike the almost featureless, nearly imbecilic Henry of historical legend and earlier productions [...] Warner showed the king as growing from youthful naiveté and subservience to the intriguers around him into a man of perception and personal integrity entrapped in and lamenting a world of violence not of his own making." In his 2001 Oxford Shakespeare edition of 3 Henry VI, Randall Martin writes "Warner created a painfully shy, physically awkward, but ultimately saintly figure, who passed through agonies of doubt before reaching a Christ-like serenity. He characterised Henry above all through qualities of deep piety and lost innocence."

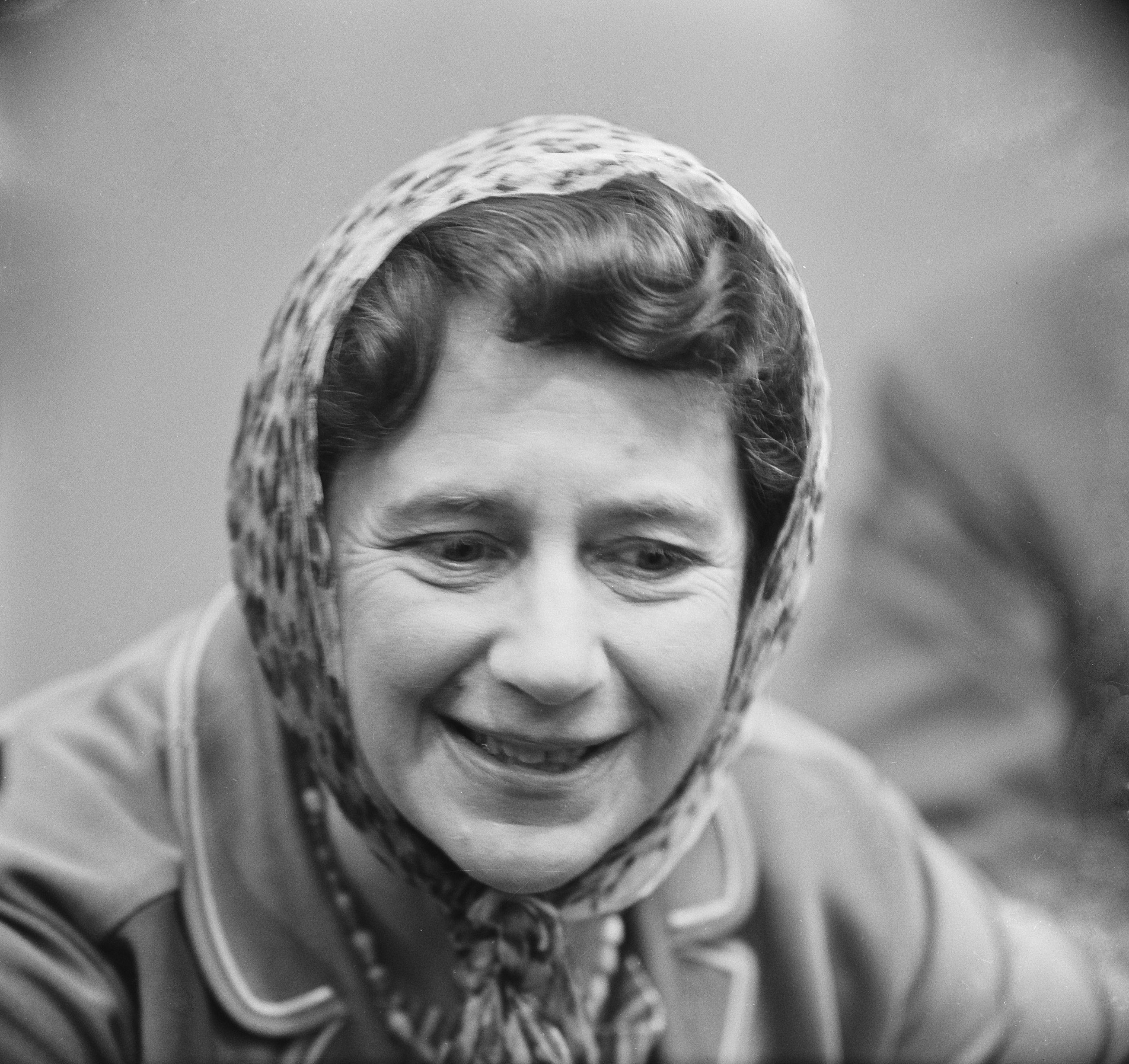
Peggy Ashcroft in 1962. Ashcroft relished the opportunity to develop the character of Margaret of Anjou over all four plays, and her resulting performance was one of the most lauded aspects of the entire production.

Another lauded performance was that of Peggy Ashcroft as Margaret, whose role is usually heavily cut, and often eliminated from both 1 Henry VI and, especially, Richard III. Margaret is the only character to appear in all four plays (unless one counts the Ghost of Henry VI in Richard III), and Ashcroft relished the chance to develop the character over the entire production, arguing that Margaret is "a Dark Lady if ever there was one – and prototype for Cressida, Cleopatra, Lady Macbeth – was Shakespeare's first "heroine" – if such she can be called [...] It takes four plays to make her one of the great female characters in Shakespeare – and the full-length portrait has been seen only in The Wars of the Roses cycle – but she has facets that are not touched on in any other." Ashcroft saw the scene from 2 Henry VI where she appears on-stage carrying the head of her lover, the Duke of Suffolk, as pivotal to both the character's development and her own understanding of Margaret; "I came to realise why this scene was of paramount importance – for later in what is one of the greatest and certainly most horrific scenes [...] when Margaret wipes the blood of York's son on the Duke's face [...] I found that seemingly impossible bestial act to be credible as the result of the violence that has been perpetrated on her lover."

John Russell Brown singled out Ashcroft's performance during this scene as especially noteworthy, arguing that her performance, with its mixture of hatred, violence and laughter, "was a portrayal of weakness in cruelty, helplessness in victory [...] the cruel humour of the lines was played close to hysteria: "I prithee grieve to make me merry" was an almost necessary request to excuse Margaret's impulse towards helpless laughter, a physical and emotional relief and a breakdown of control." Writing in the Financial Times, T.C. Worsley commented, "I shall long remember the speech she makes to her dispirited followers making their last stand. She summons some inner strength from out of the weariness of defeat and, though she speaks like a lioness, the beast in her, you can feel, is already dead." Randall Martin wrote

Ashcroft's full-spectrum performance [extended] the dramatic boundaries of Margaret's public agency and personal emotions. This came about [...] in part because of [Hall and Barton's] emphasis on psychological detail and motivational complexity. Ashcroft convinced audiences of Margaret's human growth from passionate youth to self-possessed maturity. By the time she reached Edward IV, and until the moment of Prince Edward's death, she dominated the production's two main sites of power and conflict; the council-board and the battlefield [...] At the same time, Ashcroft strongly conveyed Part Three's new dimension of maternal solicitude, problematizing the Amazon stereotype to which her male opponents always seek to reduce her.

Another especially celebrated aspect of the production was the set, designed by John Bury, who used the work of Karl von Appen and Caspar Neher as his primary visual inspiration. Bury constructed the set primarily from plated steel, even the walls and floors were covered in textured metal, giving the entire stage a cold, metallic appearance. At the back of the stage was a steel trellis and movable walls of triangular shape covered with riveted plates. T.C. Worlsey commented of the set that "we seem to be claustrophobically caught between two swinging metal wings that crush us from one side then from the other." According to Bury, "this was a period of armour and a period of the sword; they were plays about warfare, about power, about danger [...] This was the image of the plays. We wanted an image rather than a naturalistic setting. We were trying to make a world, a dangerous world, a terrible world, in which all these happenings fit." Bury employed the notion of "selective realism"; using one or two realistic props to emphasise the social dimensions of the narrative. In this case, such realism was manifested by a massive oval-shaped iron council table which took up a large portion of the stage – the constantly changing group of figures who sit at the table visually emphasising the turbulence and political instability of the period. Peter Hall himself wrote of the set, "on the flagged floor of sheet steel tables are daggers, staircases are axe-heads, and doors the traps on scaffolds. Nothing yields: stone walls have lost their seduction and now loom dangerously – steel-clad – to enclose and to imprison. The countryside offers no escape, the danger is still there in the iron foliage of the cruel trees, and, surrounding all, the great steel cage of war."

=== Reception ===
The production was hailed as a triumph, and is generally recognised as reviving the reputation of the Henry VI plays in the modern theatre. Writing for the Daily Mail, Bernard Levin called it a

monumental production. One of the mightiest stage projects of our time, a production to remember all our lives, whose final third was carried through to the end with the same bloodstained power, the same attention to the verse and the depth of characters who speak it that characterised the first two-thirds. The last scene – the Battle of Bosworth – sums up and sets the seal on all that has gone before. At the end Richard, broken, mad, and exhausted, a Hitler with only his visor for a bunker, summons up his last strength for the duel with Richmond. It is savage, primitive, and horrible: so were the Wars of the Roses.

Harold Hobson wrote, "I doubt if anything as valuable has ever been done for Shakespeare in the whole history of the stage." The adaptation was immediately seen as the yardstick against which all future productions would be measured, and as late as 2000, it was still regarded by some critics as the finest ever production of the tetralogy; reviewing Michael Boyd's 2000/2001 production for the RSC, Carole Woddis wrote The Wars of the Roses "remains still the benchmark in terms of political and psychological elucidation and drive."

== Television ==
In 1965, BBC 1 broadcast all three plays from the trilogy. Produced by Michael Barry and directed for television by Robin Midgley and Michael Hayes, the plays were presented as more than simply filmed theatre, with the core idea being "to recreate theatre production in televisual terms – not merely to observe it, but to get to the heart of it." Filming was done on the Royal Shakespeare Theatre stage, but not during actual performances, thus allowing cameras to get close to the actors, and cameramen with hand-held cameras to shoot battle scenes. Additionally, camera platforms were created around the theatre. In all, twelve cameras were used, allowing the final product to be edited more like a film than a piece of static filmed theatre. The TV adaptation was shot following the 1964 run of the plays at Stratford-upon-Avon, and took place over eight weeks, with fifty-two BBC staff working alongside eighty-four RSC staff to bring the project to fruition.

=== 1965 broadcast ===
==== Henry VI ====
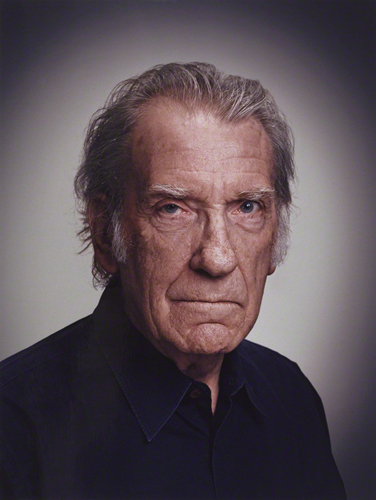
David Warner in 2013. Warner was a relatively unknown actor when he was cast as Henry VI, and his casting was considered a risk by some. However, his subsequent performance received critical acclaim.

- Originally aired: 8 April 1965
- Content: Abridged versions of 1 Henry VI and 2 Henry VI up to Act 3, Scene 2 (Winchester's death).

The English

- John Normington as Bedford
- Paul Hardwick as Gloucester
- Donald Burton as Exeter
- Nicholas Selby as Winchester
- David Waller as Captain to Talbot
- Donald Sinden as Plantagenet
- William Squire as Suffolk
- Philip Brack as Somerset
- Brewster Mason as Warwick
- Rhys McConnochie as Vernon
- Peter Forbes-Robertson as Lawyer
- Stephen Hancock as Bassett
- Charles Thomas as Mortimer
- Ted Valentine as Lieutenant of the Tower
- Clive Morton as Lord Talbot
- Peter Gale as John Talbot
- David Rowlands as English Soldier
- David Warner as King Henry VI
- James Laurenson as Messenger to the Council
- Anthony Boden as Messenger to York
- Colette O'Neil as Eleanor
- Rhys McConnochie as Messenger to Gloucester
- Charles Kay as Sir John Hume
- Gareth Morgan as Bolingbroke
- Madoline Thomas as Margery Jourdain
- David Rowlands as A Townsman
- John Normington as Simpcox
- Sheila Grant as Simpcox's Wife
- William Dysart as First Murderer
- Gavin Morrison as Second Murderer
- Stanley Lebor as First Citizen
- Roger Jones as Second Citizen
- David Hargreaves as Third Citizen

The French

- Charles Kay as The Dauphin
- Donald Layne-Smith as Reignier
- Peter Geddis as Alençon
- Gareth Morgan as Orleans
- Hugh Sullivan as Burgundy
- Janet Suzman as Joan la Pucelle
- Peggy Ashcroft as Margaret
- Murray Brown as French Messenger
- Peter Forbes-Robertson as French Soldier
- John Hales as Papal Legate

==== Edward IV ====
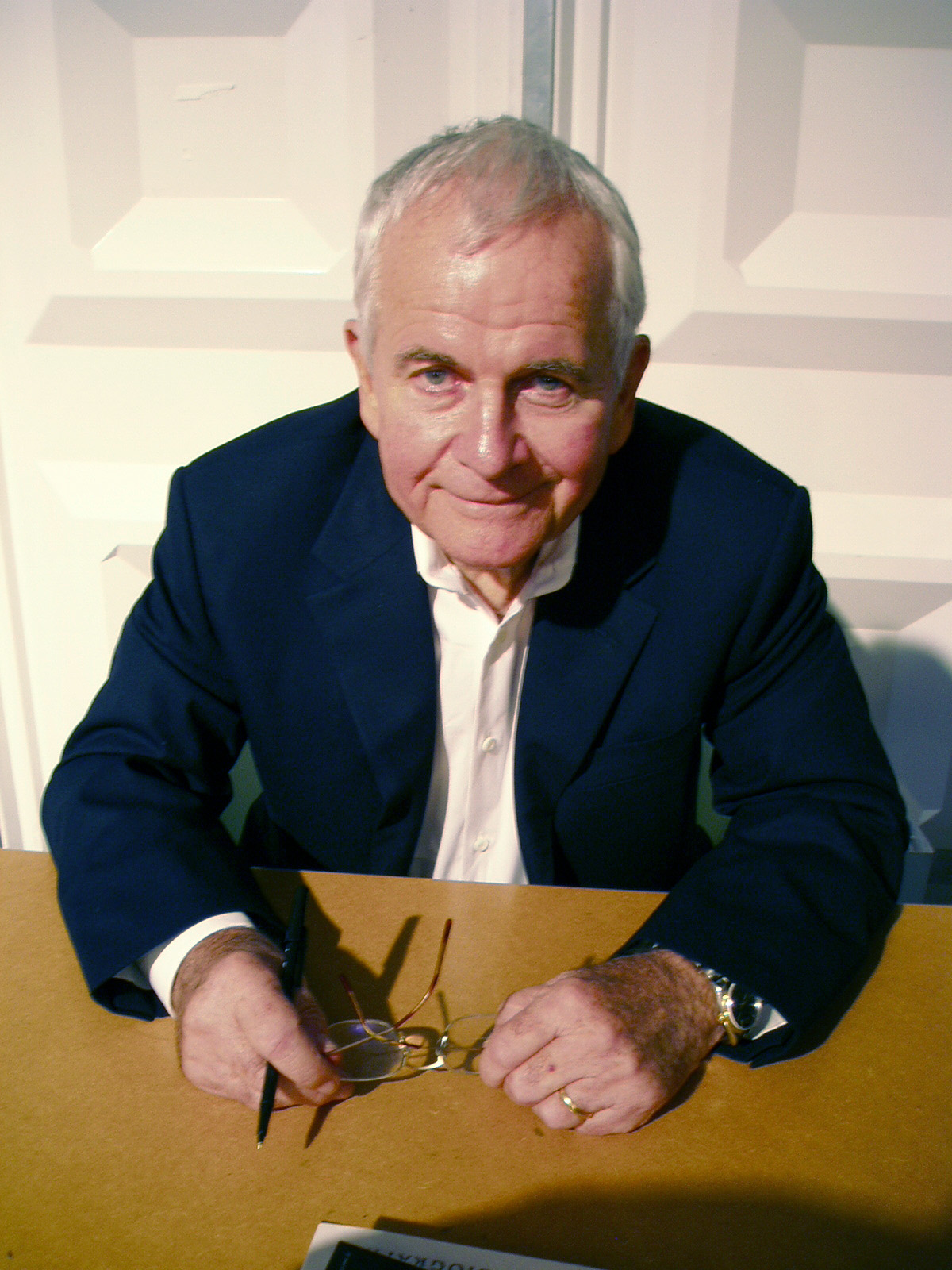
Ian Holm in 2004. Holm portrayed Richard III in an understated manner, wanting his performance to move away from the larger-than-life Machiavellian villain seen in other productions and films.

- Originally aired: 15 April 1965
- Content: A newly written scene followed by 2 Henry VI from Act 4, Scene 1 (the introduction of Jack Cade) onwards, and an abridged version of 3 Henry VI.

The House of Lancaster

- David Warner as King Henry VI
- Peggy Ashcroft as Margaret
- Alan Tucker as Prince Edward
- Donald Burton as Exeter
- Donald Layne-Smith as Lord Say
- John Corvin as Lord Clifford
- John Normington as Young Clifford
- Jeffery Dench as Sir Humphrey Stafford
- Philip Brack as Somerset
- Maurice Jones as Oxford
- Peter Geddis as A Son that has killed his Father
- Lee Menzies as Richmond
- Andrew Lodge as Messenger to the Council
- Gavin Morrison as First Lancastrian Soldier
- William Dysart as Second Lancastrian Soldier
- Guy Gordon as Lancastrian Messenger
- Brewster Mason as Warwick

The House of York

- Donald Sinden as York
- Roy Dotrice as King Edward IV
- Charles Kay as Clarence
- Ian Holm as Gloucester
- Fergus McClelland as Rutland
- Madoline Thomas as Duchess of York
- Anthony Boden as Messenger
- David Waller as A Father that has killed his Son
- David Hargreaves as Norfolk
- Susan Engel as Lady Elizabeth Grey
- Hugh Sullivan as Hastings
- Derek Waring as Rivers
- William Squire as Buckingham
- Marshall Jones as First Watch
- David Rowlands as Second Watch
- Roger Jones as Third Watch

The Commons

- Roy Dotrice as Jack Cade
- Marshall Jones as Smith
- Ted Valentine as Dick
- Tim Wylton as Michael
- Stephen Hancock as Clerk of Chatham
- Malcolm Webster as Alexander Iden
- Tim Wylton as First Keeper
- Jeffery Dench as Second Keeper
- Ted Valentine as Lieutenant of the Tower

The French

- John Hussey as King Lewis XI
- Colette O'Neil as The Lady Bona
- Hugh Sullivan as Burgundy
- Peter Geddis as Alençon

==== Richard III ====
- Originally aired: 22 April 1965
- Abridged version of Richard III.

The House of York

- Roy Dotrice as King Edward IV
- Susan Engel as Queen Elizabeth
- Fergus McClelland as Prince Edward
- Paul Martin as Richard
- Katherine Barker as Princess Elizabeth
- Charles Kay as Clarence
- Ian Holm as Gloucester
- Madoline Thomas as Duchess of York
- Hugh Sullivan as Hastings
- Derek Waring as Rivers
- William Squire as Buckingham
- Charles Thomas as Catesby
- John Corvin as Ratcliff
- David Hargreaves as Norfolk
- Henry Knowles as Tyrrel
- David Ellison as First Messenger
- Murray Brown as Second Messenger
- Anthony Boden as Third Messenger

The House of Lancaster

- David Warner as King Henry VI
- Peggy Ashcroft as Margaret
- Alan Tucker as Prince Edward
- Janet Suzman as Lady Anne
- Eric Porter as Richmond
- Maurice Jones as Oxford

Reconcilers of the Two Houses

- John Hussey as Derby
- Michael Rose as Bishop of Ely

The Commons

- Ted Valentine as Lieutenant of the Tower
- Donald Burton as First Murderer
- Philip Brack as Second Murderer
- Malcolm Webster as Lord Mayor
- Marshall Jones as First Citizen
- Terence Greenidge as Second Citizen
- Jeffery Dench as Third Citizen
- David Morton as Messenger from Derby

=== 1966 broadcast ===
In 1966, the production was repeated on BBC 1 where it was re-edited into eleven episodes of fifty minutes each.

"The Inheritance"

- Originally aired: 6 January 1966
- Content: 1 Henry VI Acts 1, 2, 3 and Act 4, Scene 1 (Henry choosing a red rose and inadvertently aligning himself with Somerset).

"Margaret of Anjou"

- Originally aired: 13 January 1966
- Content: 1 Henry VI Act 4, Scene 2 (Lord Talbot confronting the French general at Harfleur), and the first half of Act 1, Scene 1 of 2 Henry VI (up to Henry and Margaret leaving the court).

"The Lord Protector"

- Originally aired: 20 January 1966
- Content: the second half of Act 1, Scene 1 of 2 Henry VI (Gloucester unburdening his concerns to the court) and the rest of Act 1, Act 2 and Act 3, Scene 1 (York's soliloquy regarding the fact he now has troops at his disposal, and his revelation of his plans to use Jack Cade to instigate a popular rebellion).

"The Council Board"

- Originally aired: 27 January 1966
- Content: 2 Henry VI Act 3, Scene 2 to Act 4, Scene 8 (beginning with the aftermath of Humphrey's murder, and concluding with Jack Cade's forces abandoning him).

"The Fearful King"

- Originally aired: 3 February 1966
- Content: 2 Henry VI Act 4, Scene 9 (Henry pardoning those who abandoned Jack Cade) and 3 Henry VI Act 1 and Act 2, Scene 1 (Warwick rallying Edward, Richard and Clarence after the death of their father).

"The Kingmaker"

- Originally aired: 10 February 1966
- Content: 3 Henry VI Act 2, Scene 2 to Act 3, Scene 3 (beginning with the arrival of the House of Lancaster to York, and concluding with Warwick's avowal to remove Edward from the throne and restore Henry).

"Edward of York"

- Originally aired: 17 February 1966
- Content: 3 Henry VI Act 3, Scene 4 to Act 5, Scene 5 (beginning with George abandoning Edward in protest at his marriage to Lady Grey, and concluding with the death of Prince Edward and the Yorkist victory at the Battle of Tewkesbury).

"The Prophetess"

- Originally aired: 24 February 1966
- Content: 3 Henry VI Act 5, Scene 6 (Richard murdering Henry) and Richard III Act 1, Scenes 1, 2 and 3 (Richard sending two murderers to kill George).

"Richard of Gloucester"

- Originally aired: 3 March 1966
- Contents: Richard III Act 1, Scene 4 to Act 3, Scene 4 (beginning with George's murder, and concluding with the arrest of Hastings).

"Richard the King"

- Originally aired: 10 March 1966
- Contents: Richard III Act 3, Scene 5 to Act 5, Scene 1 (beginning with the Lord Mayor arriving to implore Richard to become King, and concluding with the death of Buckingham).

"Henry Tudor"

- Originally aired: 17 March 1966
- Contents: Richard III Act 5, Scene 2 onwards (Richmond's arrival in England).

=== DVD ===
In June 2016, Illuminations Media released the series on DVD for the first time. Presented in the original three-play format, the box set also included a new "Making of" featurette, featuring interviews with David Warner and Janet Suzman.

== See also ==
- An Age of Kings (1960)
- The Spread of the Eagle (1963)
- BBC Television Shakespeare (1978–1985)
- Shakespeare: The Animated Tales (1992–1994)
- ShakespeaRe-Told (2005)
- The Hollow Crown (2012; 2016)
