= Stephen Hancock =

British actor

- Born: Philip Stephen Hancock; 24 November 1925; Bishop Auckland, County Durham, England
- Died: 1 November 2015 (aged 89); Southwold, Suffolk, England
- Education: Durham University
- Occupations: Actor, musical director
- Spouse: Jocelyne Page
- Children: 2
- Relatives: Christopher Hancock (brother)

Philip Stephen Hancock (24 November 1925 – 1 November 2015) was a British television and stage actor, musical director and pianist.

He was born in Bishop Auckland, County Durham and attended the Chorister School, Durham and the Darlington Grammar School before reading music at Durham University as a mature student. He served as a radio engineer in the Royal Air Force during World War II.

He was best known for his role as Ernest Bishop in Coronation Street. Introduced as wedding photographer Gordon Bishop in a 1967 episode dedicated to one of Elsie Tanner's marriages, he later re-emerged as the regular character Ernie and played the character from 1969 until being written out in a fatal shooting during a burglary at Mike Baldwin's factory in 1978. In 1980, he portrayed Roche Lynch in an episode of the Granada Television series Lady Killers. Late minor TV roles included appearances in Victoria Wood as Seen on TV in 1985/1986. He appeared as Mr Lillie in the Tales of the Unexpected (TV series) episode (9/6) "The Facts of Life" (1988).

He also acted in stage productions, and was musical director for others, and composed music for radio.

His brother was the late Christopher Hancock who played Charlie Cotton in EastEnders. In 2011 he appeared in a Coronation Street tribute programme.

== Filmography ==
Year	Title	Role	Notes
1954	Dear Dotty	Ian Prenderghast	4 episodes
1954	The Three Musketeers	Jackson	
1959–1961	Emergency Ward 10	Dr. John Faulkner	Recurring role; 20 episodes
1960	Arthur's Treasured Volumes	Mr Bolton	
1960	The Strange World of Gurney Slade	Businessman	
1961	Coronation Street	Baby Shop assistant	
1961	ITV Television Playhouse	Mr Matthews	
1961	Family Solicitor	Mr Boggis	
1962	Z-Cars	Man	
1962	Armchair Theatre	Journalist	
1962	Coronation Street	Mr Spinks	4 episodes
1962	The Largest Theatre in the World: Heart to Heart	Technical Operations Manager	
1963	Badger's Bond	Mr Price	
1963	The Plane Makers	Mr Kershaw	
1963	The Avengers	Ralph	
1963	Story Box	The Professor	
1963	Comedy Playhouse	Scoutmaster	
1965	The Wars of the Roses	Clerk of Chatham	2 episodes
1966	United!	Bert	
1966	The Wars of the Roses	Bassett	
1966	Crossroads	Warren Haycroft	2 episodes
1966	North and South	Harry Carter	3 episodes
1967	The Newcomers	Travel Agent	
1967; 1969–1978	Coronation Street	Ernest Bishop	Regular role; 410 episodes
1967	Crossroads	Councillor Clewes	4 episodes
1967	City '68	Greenaway	
1968	Spindoe	Meths drinker	
1968	For Amusement Only	Insurance Inspector	
1968	The Newcomers	Mr Maddocks	2 episodes
1980	Sounding Brass	Leonard Dukes	6 episodes
1980	Ladykillers	Roche Lynch	
1983	The Gaffer	Police Sergeant	
1983	Andy Robson	Kirkley	
1985	Summer Season	Mr Hancock	
1985	Big Deal	Doctor	
1986	Victoria Wood: As Seen on TV	Various roles	3 episodes
1987	All in Good Faith	Crematorium director	
1987	Marjorie and the Preacherman	Bill	
1987	1914 All Out	Norman Grant	
1988	Tales of the Unexpected	Mr Lillie	
1989	The Return of Shelley	Frank	
1989	The Heat of the Day	Blythe	
1990	Agatha Christie's Poirot	Mullings	
1990	Chicago Joe and the Showgirl	Doctor	
1991	Screen One	Mr Jackson	
1993	Side by Side	Alan	
1993	Screen One	Peters	
1995	Harry	Albert Hawkins	
1997	New Voices	Mr Cosgrove	
1997	The Locksmith	Judge	
2008	Heartbeat	John Harper	
2008	Doctor Who: The Companion Chronicles	The First Mate	Voice role
