= Richard Whittington-Egan =

British writer and criminologist

Richard Whittington-Egan (22 October 1924 – 14 September 2016) was a British writer and criminologist, the author of Liverpool Colonnade and Liverpool Roundabout, two colourful chronicles of Liverpool's historical characters, crimes and mysteries. A leading author on true crime over a long period of time, he is acknowledged also as an expert on Jack the Ripper.

== Early Biography ==
Born in Liverpool in 1924 and grew up spending half the year there and half the year in his other family home in South Kensington, London. He is, on his mother's side, the great-grandson of Jakob Zeugheer-Herrmann, the first conductor of the Royal Liverpool Philharmonic Orchestra, who conducted for Paganini and Jenny Lind. Another maternal ancestor is Sir Jonah Barrington, the Irish High Court Judge, who was also a writer and author of several classic volumes of Irish history and local chatter and colour. On his father's side he is descended from Dr. Richard Whittington-Egan, his great-grandfather, who was Crown pathologist for Ireland.

Educated by a private tutor and at Stonyhurst College, the noted Jesuit public school near Clitheroe, Lancashire. Whittington-Egan originally read medicine in the family's traditional medico-legal tradition and was also to qualify for the Bar. During the Second World War, he served in the army, in France, Switzerland, Germany, Austria, and Italy, where he broadcast to the Allied Forces. Illness while in Italy forced him to curtail his medical studies and concentrate on writing. As a freelance journalist, he contributed to many newspapers and periodicals, including The Times, The Daily Telegraph, The Guardian, Contemporary Review, Books and Bookmen, Chambers's Journal, the Daily Mail, the Daily Express, the Liverpool Daily Post, and the Liverpool Echo as well as the New York Times. He spent 30 years on Fleet Street with Associated Newspapers. He also served as a director of Contemporary Review, and in 2004 and 2011, two selections of his critical writings were published in book form.

== Later Biography ==
Whittington-Egan's literary career began in 1955 when he published Liverpool Colonnade, a study of his native city. This book was soon followed by Liverpool Roundabout, another colourful book of essays on Liverpudlian history, with particular emphasis on ghosts, criminals and various historical oddities. In 1969, he published Liverpool Soundings and in 1972 the well illustrated Liverpool: This is my City. In the 1980s, his early Liverpool books were reissued in the popular Liverpool Dossier series. In 2002, he published Liverpool Echoes and Liverpool Shadows, two more books of essays on Liverpool history. Yet another volume, Liverpool Landfall, was published in 2016.

Whittington-Egan has also taken an interest in Victorian history, and written several critically praised biographies of literary figures of this time. In 1960, he wrote, with Geoffrey Smerdon, the standard biography of the Liverpool-born 'nineties poet and man of letters Richard Le Gallienne: The Quest of the Golden Boy. In later years, he has chronicled the lives of the poet and dramatist Stephen Phillips, the self-destructive poet Lionel Johnson, the curious poet and musician Theophile Marzials, and the prolific naturalist the Rev. J.G. Wood. Having a keen interest in the spectral world, he edited five volumes of the Weekend Books of Ghosts and Horror between 1975 and 1985, contributing many stories himself. In 2010, he published a biography of the mysterious Teresa Higginson, a religious fanatic who believed herself to be tormented by the Devil, and who is thought by some to have a claim to sainthood. In 2016 he published The Master Ghost Hunter, a full-length biography of the once-famous ghost hunter Elliott O'Donnell.

It is as a true crime writer that Whittington-Egan particularly excelled. His earliest book in this genre was The Ordeal of Philip Yale Drew, about the 1929 unsolved murder of the Reading tobacconist Alfred Oliver, and the question of the guilt of the main suspect, the American actor Philip Yale Drew. Three years later, he published The Riddle of Birdhurst Rise, a full-length study of the Croydon poison mystery of 1928. Both these books are recognized as classics in the field of true crime history, and after being reissued as Penguin paperbacks, they enjoyed considerable sales. In 1975, Whittington-Egan published a Casebook on Jack the Ripper, which has been much sought after by collectors of Ripperine literature. In 1991, he published the standard biography of the great Scottish criminologist William Roughead, with extensive and valuable comments on the celebrated cases covered by Roughead during his lifetime. His next crime book was a full-length study of the Oscar Slater case, and in 2002, he published the standard account of the fascinating Cheltenham torso mystery. In 2013, he published a much extended Definitive Casebook on Jack the Ripper, containing a full historiography of this celebrated case. In 2015, he published Mr. Atherstone leaves the Stage, an account of the unsolved Battersea murder of the actor Thomas Weldon Atherstone in 1910, and the following year Tales from the Dead-House, a collection of essays concerning macabre crimes.

For some years, Whittington-Egan lived in Great Malvern, Worcestershire, with his wife, Molly Whittington-Egan, also a writer. Whittington-Egan was a member of the Medico-Legal Society, the Crime Writers' Association, and the Society for Psychical Research.

== Selected publications ==
- Liverpool Colonnade, Philip, Son & Nephew 1955, reissue by E.J. Morten 1976.
- Liverpool Roundabout, Philip, Son & Nephew 1957, reissue by E.J. Morten 1976.
- The Quest of the Golden Boy, Unicorn Press 1960.
- Liverpool Soundings, Gallery Press 1969.
- Liverpool: This is my City, Gallery Press 1972.
- The Ordeal of Philip Yale Drew, Harrap 1972, paperback reissue by Penguin in 1989.
- The Riddle of Birdhurst Rise, Harrap 1975, paperback reissue by Penguin 1989.
- A Casebook on Jack the Ripper, Wildy & Sons 1975.
- Weekend Book of Ghosts, Associated Newspapers 1975.
- Weekend Second Book of Ghosts, Associated Newspapers 1978.
- Weekend Book of Ghosts and Horror, Associated Newspapers 1981.
- Weekend Book of Ghosts and Horror No. 2, Associated Newspapers 1982.
- Weekend Book of Ghosts No. 5, Associated Newspapers 1985.
- Tales of Liverpool [Liverpool Dossier], Gallery Press 1985.
- Liverpool Characters & Eccentrics [Liverpool Dossier], Gallery Press 1985.
- Liverpool Oddities [Liverpool Dossier], Gallery Press 1986.
- Liverpool Ghosts and Ghouls [Liverpool Dossier], Gallery Press 1986.
- Liverpool Log Book [Liverpool Dossier], Gallery Press 1987.
- The Great Liverpool Blitz [Liverpool Dossier], Gallery Press 1987.
- William Roughead's Chronicles of Murder, Lochar Publishing 1991.
- The Oscar Slater Murder Story, Neil Wilson Publishing 2001.
- Liverpool Echoes, Bluecoat Press 2002.
- Liverpool Shadows, Bluecoat Press 2002.
- The Great British Torso Mystery, Bluecoat Press 2002.
- Speaking Volumes, (2004)
- Stephen Phillips: a Biography, Rivendale Press 2006.
- Murder Files, Magpie Books 2006.
- Liverpool Murders, Bluecoat Press 2009.
- The Devil in Bootle: A Life of Teresa Helena Higginson, Bluecoat Press 2010.
- Talking of Books, (2011)
- Lionel Johnson: Victorian Dark Angel, (2012)
- Theophile Marzials: Poet in a Gallery of Pigeons, (2013)
- Jack the Ripper: The Definitive Casebook, Amberley Publishing 2013, paperback reissue 2015.
- The Natural History Man: The Life of the Reverend J.G. Wood, (2014)
- Mr Atherstone leaves the Stage, Amberley Publishing 2015.
- Tales from the Dead-House, Amberley Publishing 2016.
- Liverpool Landfall, Bluecoat Press 2016.
- The Master Ghost Hunter: A Life of Elliott O'Donnell, Mango Books 2016.

Edited, with his wife Molly Whittington-Egan, a lawyer:-

- The Story of Mr. George Edalji, Grey House Books 1985.

...and collaborated with her on:-

- The Bedside Book of Murder, David & Charles 1988.
- The Murder Almanac, Neil Wilson Publishing 1992.
- Murder on File, Neil Wilson Publishing 2005.
