= George William Cornish =

Cornish (left), pictured at the crime scene of the murder of Vera Page, 1931

George William Cornish (20 October 1873 - 6 February 1959) was an English detective who served in the Metropolitan Police.

== Life ==
Born in Westbury, Wiltshire and initially working as a farmer, he first joined the Met on its H (Whitechapel) Division on 4 March 1895. His first major case was the investigation into the 1913 Great Pearl Robbery, during which he was a 1st Class Detective Sergeant. He was also involved in that into the Charing Cross Trunk Murder as a Detective Chief Inspector in 1927.

Cornish retired on 1 October 1933 at the rank of Detective Superintendent and published his memoirs two years later.
