= William Willcox (toxicologist) =

British physician and toxicologist

Sir William Henry Willcox (18.01.1870–08.07.1941) K.C.I.E., C.B., C.M.G., M.D., F.R.C.P. was an English toxicologist, physician and consultant.

Born in Melton Mowbray, his first degree was in chemistry, a subject which he then taught in a private school for four years – he also became a fellow of the Institute of Chemistry. He began studying medicine at St Mary's Hospital Medical School in 1895 and qualified in 1900.

In 1904 he was made an expert forensic advisor to the Home Office, a role he held until his death and in which he trained his successors Bernard Spilsbury and Roche Lynch. In the first ten years alone he testified at the trials of Hawley Harvey Crippen, Steinie Morrison, Frederick Seddon and twenty-two other manslaughter or murder trials. He also advised on the death of Jessie Llewellyn of Llanelly in 1928

In 1907 he was made physician to St Mary's Hospital, retiring from that role in 1935 – he also lectured and worked as a consultant there. He pioneered the TAB vaccine and served in the Gallipoli campaign of the First World War – for the latter work he was made a Knight Commander of the Order of the Indian Empire and a Companion of the Orders of the Bath and St Michael and St George. In the 1920s he began writing on barbiturate addiction.
