= Murder of George Gutteridge =

1927 murder of a police officer in England

Frederick Guy Browne (1883–1928) and William Henry Kennedy (1891–1928) were two career criminals who were executed in Britain in 1928 for the murder of George Gutteridge (1891–1927), an unarmed policeman in the course of his duties, whom they shot in both eyes.

The fiasco of people trying to phone for police aid was a factor in leading to the free 999 service in the UK.

== Gutteridge ==
PC George William Gutteridge was born at Downham Market in Norfolk in 1891. In 1910 he joined the Essex Police Force as PC 489 and was posted to Southend-on-Sea. He later served in both Romford and Grays and in April 1918 temporarily resigned to join the Machine Gun Corps. Having survived this he rejoined the police at Grays in February 1919. From 1919 to 1922 he was based at Little Thurrock.

In March 1922, he transferred to Epping and was based at Stapleford Abbotts, a small village between Ongar and Romford.

He lived in the village at 2 Towneley Cottages with his wife, Rose Annette Emmerline, and their two young children, who were 12 and 4 at the time of the event.

== Browne ==
Frederick Guy Browne was born in 1883 in Catford to poor parents. In 1909 he was living with his mother in Eynsham in Oxfordshire and ran a bicycle repair shop called Brown Brothers. He began stealing bicycles, rebuilding them to disguise their identity, then resold them. After missing a serial number he served 12 months in prison. He was also convicted in 1910 in Abingdon for carrying a revolver. He also had several convictions for larceny and theft.

He was a striking individual being exceptionally tall: 6'7" (2.01m). He was reportedly a non-smoker and tee-totaller. He married a Miss Finch in 1915 and moved to Clapham. In 1916 he joined the Royal Engineers as a sapper but saw no active service and spent the entire period at Longmoor Camp. He continued a criminal life graduating to stealing and selling cars. From 1923 to 1926, he lived in Eastwood, Essex and grew to know the Essex area well. He was imprisoned at Parkhurst but refused to do hard labour and was moved to Dartmoor. He was released from Dartmoor in March 1927.

In 1927, he was a motor engineer later acquiring his own repair garage at 7a Northcote Road, at Lavender Hill near Clapham Junction called Browne's Globe Garage. This was rented from a Mr Mistlin who owned the Globe Cinema adjacent. Browne had a long criminal record and had served terms in both Parkhurst Prison and Dartmoor Prison. He had several guns including a Webley revolver, and a small automatic Smith & Wesson.

At the time of the murder he lived with his wife and young daughter at 33a Sisters Avenue in Clapham. The house was rented from Mrs M. E. Siddals from 24 September (two days before the murder). He had moved there in September having lived at 2 Huguenot Place to the west for a week and prior to that 45 Colvin Road East Ham with his sister-in-law since his release from prison.

Continuing until his arrest in January 1928 he committed a string of robberies and car thefts during which he was armed for most of the events.

== Kennedy ==
William Henry Kennedy was born in Ayrshire in 1891 of Irish descent. His father, James Kennedy, was a mining engineer. He was a petty criminal with several incidences of robbery, assault, drunkenness and indecent exposure. He probably met Browne in prison. Periods out of prison were spent as a compositor in a print-works, and he had worked in Liverpool for several years. In 1903, he enlisted in Loyal North Lancashire Regiment serving under the name of William Herbert until 1911. From 1911 onwards he had multiple aliases and served prison terms under several different names.

His longest prison sentence was 3 years for larceny in 1913. On release in April 1916 he was conscripted and briefly served in the Hussars, deserting in August 1916. However, he rejoined under a false name, Patrick Mane Fitzpatrick, in Dublin a week later, into the King's Liverpool Regiment. However he was unable to restrain his criminal activities and he was imprisoned in May 1917 being found of guilty of theft in Oswestry and served 4 months and soon after release back to his regiment he deserted a second time. Unbelievably he rejoined the regiment in October at Bandon in County Cork under the third name of Michael Sullivan. After the war, he went back to a life of petty crime and indecent exposure.

Browne gave him a job as a handyman and bookkeeper in his Clapham garage in 1927. Kennedy slept in a room at the back of the workshop. They would go out together seeking cars to steal.

Kennedy was married to a woman from West Kirby on 18 January 1928 (after the murder). They only had one week together prior to his arrest.

At some point he had been a member of Sinn Féin and claimed to have killed two Black and Tans during the Troubles in Ireland.

== The crime ==
On 26 September 1927, PC Gutteridge returned home at 6pm after his day shift. After a meal with his family he left at 11pm for a night shift. Apart from his usual police uniform he wore his police cape, to keep out the cold night air. He met his colleague PC Sydney James Taylor, who was based at Lambourne End, at Howe Green (Havering) on the B175 at 3am. They parted around 3.25am and Gutteridge began to walk home.

Around 3.30am (600 metres (2,000 ft) from his rendezvous point) Gutteridge flagged down a suspicious blue Morris Cowley (TW6120) car driving towards him. The car contained Browne and Kennedy. Whilst writing their particulars he was shot in the side of the head at close range (25 centimetres (9.8 in)). Forensic evidence indicated he was facing in the same direction as the car and stooped over to bring his head down to the driver's level when shot. He fell on his back and Browne, the shooter, got out and said "What are you looking at me like that for?" before shooting him in each eye. The pair then drove off.

As the two shots through the eyes left bullets in the tarmac of the road, the body must have been pulled from a position on the carriageway onto the grass verge on the west side by the criminals, who left him in a seated position.

Around 6am on 27 September the local postman, delivering mail by car, William Alec Ward, dropped mail at Stapleford Abbotts post office. Travelling along the Ongar Road he found the body of PC Gutteridge slouched at the roadside with his legs sticking out on the road. A trail of blood ran 2 metres (6 ft 7 in) from the centre of the road to Gutteridge's head. He recognised the body as George Gutteridge and went for help at the nearest house: Rose Cottage, the home of Alfred Perrit. Perritt swung the legs round so as to not lie on the carriageway. A bus driver, Mr Warren, also stopped and tried to help. The bus driver initially tried to call from a public call box but the operator refused to connect him unless he paid for the call. He then drove to Havering police station to alert the crime and returned with PC Webb. The postman returned to his post office to call the main local police station at Romford.

From Romford the first to arrive was PC Albert Blockson, followed at 7.45 by Detective Inspector John Crockford. Gutteridge had been shot twice through the left cheek and once in each eye. He was still holding his pencil and his notebook and helmet lay nearby. There was no sign of a struggle. A tyre mark was left in the soft ground at the edge of the road.

At 9am a physician, Dr Robert A Woodhouse from Romford arrived, and at the police's request (and for public decency) the body was removed a short distance to an outbuilding at the Royal Oak public house. It was not taken to the mortuary at Romford until the morning of 28 September. After the body was removed two detectives each found a bullet in the pool of blood in the middle of the road: one embedded in the surface; one lying on the surface. Dr Woodhouse conducted an autopsy in Romford on 28 September. On the head he found four entry wounds (two through the eyes) and three exit wounds. One bullet was recovered from the brain behind the left eye socket.

The police suspected the crime linked to a Morris Cowley TW6120 stolen from Dr Edward R. Lovell of London Road in Billericay the night before. This was only 15 miles (24 km) from the crime scene. The stolen car was found abandoned near 21 Foxley Road in Stockwell. A cartridge case in the car was marked RLIV, indicating it was a left over from the First World War made at the Royal Laboratory in Woolwich Arsenal. There was blood on the outer running board. Its tyre matched the tyre marks at the crime scene.

Because the car was abandoned in London Scotland Yard were asked to assist and sent Chief Inspector James Berrett to investigate.

The autopsy found a variety of different rare old bullets had been fired from the same revolver, one being a Woolwich RLIV. The variety of ammunition accounted for the different effects. The inquest on Gutteridge was held on 30 September and concluded he had been murdered by a person or persons unknown.

Only when the stolen car was examined at Brixton police station was the cartridge marked RLIV found under a front seat and only there did a sergeant think he saw spots of blood on the running board. He removed this on 11 October and put it in the evidence room. Only on 8 February 1928 was it sent for examination by the Home Office pathologist Roche Lynch who confirmed the presence of human blood. The car was then returned to Dr Lovell.

== Capture ==
In his 1955 memoirs, the chief constable of Sheffield City Police 1926-1931, Percy Sillitoe, credited his force with identifying Browne through a lucky break. Around six weeks after the murder, on 14 November 1927, an ex-convict known to Sheffield police was a passenger in a car involved in a minor traffic collision in Sheffield. The driver's details and the Vauxhall car's registration were both found to be false, but when local crook Charles Currie was eventually identified as the passenger, he came forward asking to see the chief constable, naming the driver as his criminal acquaintance Browne, and linking him to the murder of PC Gutteridge. Sillitoe wrote, 'I need hardly say that as soon as my office door had closed behind Currie, I sprang into action more quickly than ever I had in my life before. Within a few seconds I was on the phone to Scotland Yard.'

The tip-off to the police concerning Kennedy probably came to the police from Joseph Thomas, a friend of Kennedy who served in the army with him 1904 to 1911 in South Africa. He was the owner of the Crack Hotel on Rice Street in Liverpool. Kennedy had shown him the revolver and asked if Thomas could find extra ammo for him. As they often got drunk together he may have let slip some detail of his crime.

On 20 January 1928, around ten police raided Browne's garage in Northcote Road, Battersea. They found many loaded weapons and (critically) cartridges marked RLIV, and multiple stolen vehicles being "transformed" and much other stolen property (including Dr Lovell's medical instruments) and consequently arrested him. Browne was taken to Tooting Police Station. A search of his home found 44 further LRIV cartridges. Browne was charged with the murder of PC Gutteridge at 00.46am on 21 January by Chief Inspector James Berrett.

Kennedy later saw the police at Browne's closed garage and fled to Liverpool where a friend, David Staunton, let him stay with him at 119 Copperas Hill, conveniently close to Lime Street Station. Kennedy and Staunton went to a local pub, the Ye Cracke on Rice Street, where he knew the landlord Joseph Thomas. He asked him if he could obtain ammo for a Savage automatic pistol he possessed. The man declined. Word of Kennedy's presence and activities reached the police. On 25 January they raided his lodgings and following a tussle where Kennedy tried to shoot an officer (DS Mattinson), they arrested him. He was taken to Warren Street Police station in Liverpool then to Cheapside, before being sent by train to London where he was held at New Scotland Yard.

Kennedy's wife accompanied him to New Scotland Yard and Kennedy's statement was made at her suggestion. He told her he was an accomplice but was not the murderer. He wholly blamed the murder on Browne and said he had no idea that he had a gun with him. Browne meanwhile denied everything and said he was with his wife on the night in question.

Assistant Commissioner Wyndham Childs saw the peculiar bullet cartridge left in the abandoned car as the most critical piece of evidence. This had not been produced since 1913. Rarer still were the black powder cartridges which had not been used since 1898. Anyone found with this ammunition was undoubtedly the killer.

The ammunition found at Browne's garage included a mixture of types all of which would fit his Webley revolver. He appeared to be in the habit of loading it with a random mixture, including flat nosed bullets, which maximise damage at close range.

Examination of Browne's car at the time of his arrest initially only found a loaded Webley in the glove compartment. Further examination revealed a secret compartment in the back of the driver's seat containing a second Webley.

Only on 6 February 1928 were the pair jointly charged with murder, having been taken to Lavender Hill Police station.

== The trial ==
(note-the entire transcript of the trial is available free online through multiple sources)

The pretrial at the Police court was led by Travers Humphreys. This raised objection to Kennedy's statement being included on grounds that the police extorted the statement.

Although English law usually advocates separate trials where two indicted accused each incriminates the other, this was not exactly what arose in this instance. An application for separate trials was denied. Mr Justice Avory presided over the joint trial at the Old Bailey which was guaranteed to receive much press attention. It began on Monday 23 April 1928 and concluded on 28 April. Press coverage was considerable. The Solicitor General, Boyd Merriman was represented by H. D. Roome and G. B. McClure. Browne's defence was led by E. F. Lever and Walter N. Frampton. Kennedy's defence was led by Frank J. Powell and Charles Abbott.

The press (and defence counsel) had implied a meeting with a Mr Fairchild of Brentford recently released from a lunatic asylum, with PC Gutteridge on the evening before. Both Mrs Gutteridge and PC Taylor disputed this story. This appears to be a red herring in the sequence of events.

Although twice instructed by Mr Justice Avory not to discuss the "attempted murder" of Sgt Mattinson at the point of Kennedy's arrest this was endured at length.

Browne's defence strongly objected to Kennedy's statement being admitted. Browne excused the stolen property and weapons on his property to other people who "slept at the garage" including Kennedy whom he claimed to barely know, Kennedy did not give evidence. Browne excused the loaded Webley pistol found on his person as a defence as he had once been robbed when delivering a car.

Kennedy's statement to the police (taken in January) was read out and admitted going to Billericay with Browne to steal a car: originally a specific Raleigh but being disturbed took the Morris Cowley instead. He explained how they stole the car and were driving along the quieter rural roads to return to London when a policeman stopped them. Browne was driving. Following some questions Browne shot the policeman twice in the cheek. Browne then shot him in each eye ensuring he was dead. They drove at speed to London crashing en route due to fog and abandoned the car in a cul-de-sac in Brixton rather than risk taking it to the garage. They then took a tram to the garage around 6am. They took two doctors bags from the car and destroyed them.

Understandably Browne's defence (which was separate from Kennedy's) argued that Kennedy's statement be inadmissible in relation to Browne as it was very damning. This was not permitted. Bizarrely, Browne refused to take the standard oath: of telling the truth, the whole truth, and nothing but the truth. He claimed "I do not know the whole truth, so I cannot make this oath". Understandably the judges reaction was "are you going to take the oath or not!?" Browne eventually took the standard oath.

Browne excused the various medical items being found at his garage (forceps etc.) as being items he had purchased to use as tools. This defence was aided by Dr Lovell's inability to exactly claim the instruments were definitely his.

Kennedy (in his statement) admitted to being very nervous and started drinking more when he read about the crime in the newspapers and on 17 December he had gone back to Liverpool.

Both George Henry Ibbitson of the Royal Arsenal at Woolwich and London gunsmith Robert Churchill gave evidence linking the gun cartridge found to Browne's Webley revolver. William Fox of the Royal Small Arms Factory at Enfield Lock and George Henry Perry of the Royal Arsenal were even more convinced and were 100% sure that Browne's Webley had fired the bullets. This was supported by photographic evidence of the unique markings on the cartridges, visible under microscope. The jury were handed the cartridge and microscope to inspect for themselves! This led the press to label the case as "hanged by microscope". Post mortem evidence was presented by Dr Roche Lynch.

Curiously the firearms experts concluded that the two bullets to the cheek and bullet to the left eye were cordite bullets but the right eye wound was fired by a black powder bullet.

Kennedy probably expected to be found guilty only as an accomplice. His evidence effectively condemned both. Had he known he would hang he would likely have been less forthcoming. They were found guilty of Gutteridge's murder. Technically Kennedy's death sentence was connected to his attempted murder of the policeman arresting him in January.

An appeal (mainly focussing on why the trials should have been separate) was dismissed. Kennedy was hanged at 9.00am at Wandsworth Prison on 31 May 1928. Browne was hanged at 9.00am at Pentonville Prison on the same day. Browne was executed by Robert Baxter assisted by Henry Pollard; Kennedy was executed by Thomas Pierrepoint assisted by Robert Wilson. Browne tried to commit suicide before he was hanged. It is a rare example of a co-ordinated double hanging at separate venues.

== Aftermath ==
Browne and Kennedy lie in unmarked graves in the prisons where they were hanged. Kennedy told his wife that he would sign this statement in order to only be charged as an accomplice, and he was clearly the less guilty party. In 2020, the case was reexamined in the series Murder, Mystery and My Family. Judge David Radford considered the 1928 verdict safe.

George Gutteridge is buried in Warley Cemetery, not far from the site of his murder. A memorial plaque also marks the murder site and the section of road involved has been renamed Gutteridge Lane.

The weapons and bullets involved are held in the Essex Police Museum and Scotland Yard's Crime Museum, with the revolver specifically used in the murder on loan from the former to the latter.
