= Gunnersbury Cemetery =

Cemetery in London

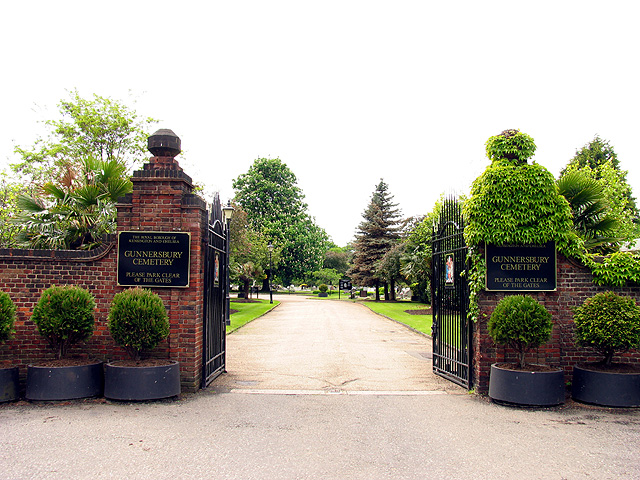
- Gate of the Gunnersbury Cemetery
- Interactive map of Gunnersbury Cemetery

Details
- Established: 1929
- Location: 143 Gunnersbury Avenue, Acton, London W3 8LE
- Country: United Kingdom
- Coordinates: 51.49497°N 0.28350°W
- Type: Public
- Owned by: Royal Borough of Kensington and Chelsea
- Size: 8.9 hectares (22 acres)

Gunnersbury Cemetery, also known as Kensington or New Kensington Cemetery, is a cemetery opened in 1929. Although it is owned and managed by the Royal Borough of Kensington and Chelsea, it is geographically located within the London Borough of Hounslow, at 143 Gunnersbury Avenue in Acton.

== History ==
A triangle of land between the Gunnersbury Avenue and the Great West Road, part of the Gunnersbury Park, was bought in 1925 from the Rothschild family by the Royal Borough. The cemetery was founded soon afterwards, in 1929, on the former parkland.

== Location and facilities ==
The cemetery is situated adjacent to Gunnersbury Park and covers about 8.9 hectares. It has numerous floral displays and shrubberies, and a chapel. The cemetery's buildings, including the chapel, are simple brick structures. A Garden of Remembrance serves as the place for the interment of cremated remains. There is also a Book of Remembrance for memorial inscriptions. Gunnersbury Cemetery is the location of the main office for both the Borough's cemeteries (the other being the Royal Borough of Kensington and Chelsea Cemetery, Hanwell).

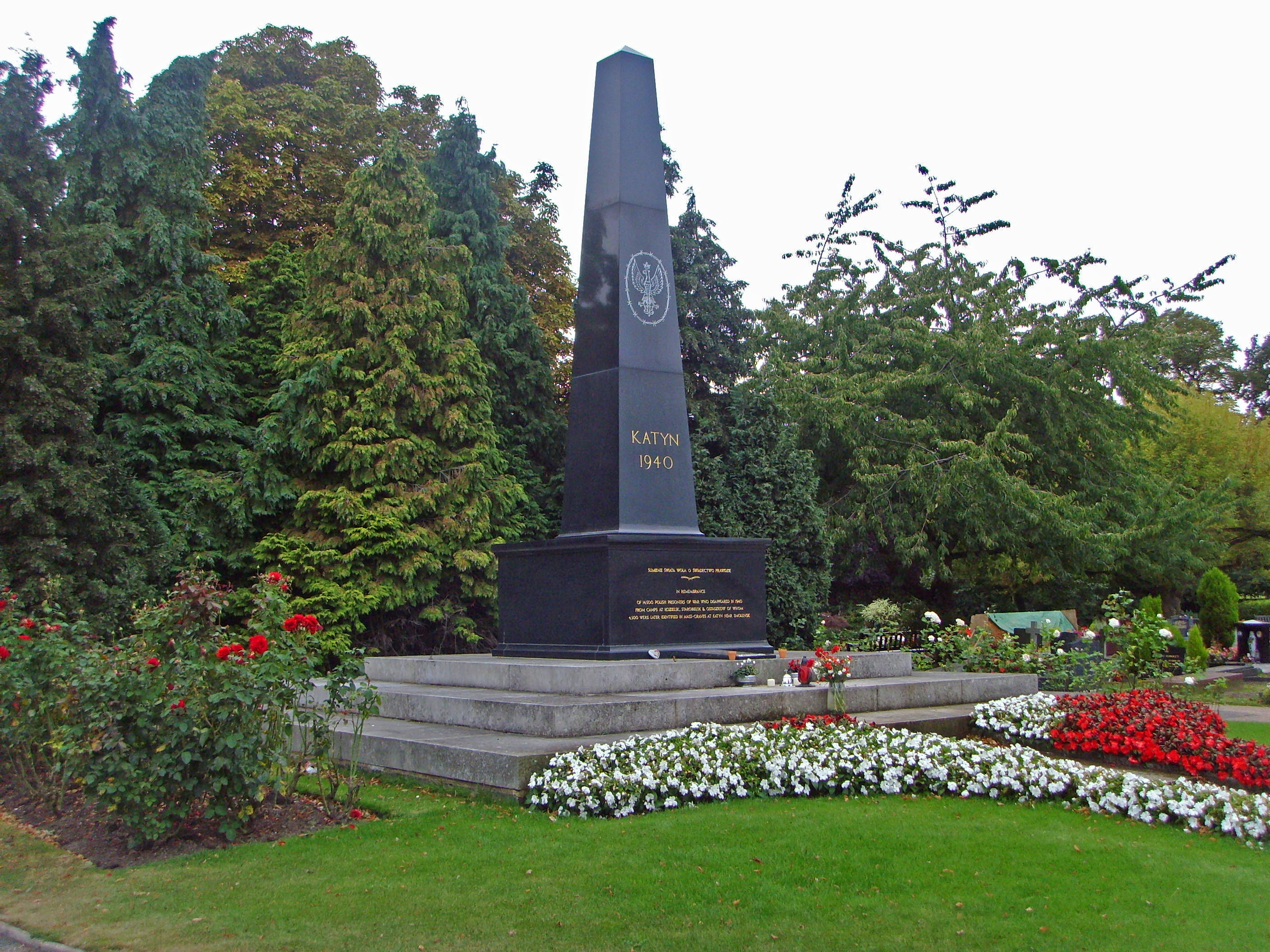
The Katyn monument

A notable landmark at the cemetery is a monument, in the form of a black obelisk, dedicated to the Polish victims of the Katyn massacre. It was designed by Louis Fitzgibbon and Count Stefan Zamoyski. This monument was unveiled on 18 September 1976 amid considerable controversy. During the period of the Cold War, successive British governments objected to plans by the UK's Polish community to build a major monument to commemorate the massacre. The Soviet Union did not want Katyn to be remembered, and put pressure on Britain to prevent the creation of the monument. As a result, the construction of the Katyn monument was delayed for many years. After the local community had finally secured the right to build the monument, no official government representative was present at the opening ceremony (although some Members of Parliament did attend the event unofficially).

Gunnersbury Cemetery also contains the graves of 49 Commonwealth service personnel of World War II.

There was a notable sculpture by Nereo Cescott in the cemetery, but it was destroyed by vandals prior to 1994.

== Opening hours ==
| Month | Mon-Sat | Sun |
|---|---|---|
| January | 9.00–16.30 | 9.00–16.30 |
| February | 9.00–17.30 | 9:00–17.30 |
| March | 9:00–17.30 | 9:00–17.30 |
| April | 9.00–19.00 | 9.00–18.00 |
| May | 9.00–19.00 | 9.00–18.00 |
| June | 9.00–20.00 | 9.00–19.00 |
| July | 9.00–20.00 | 9.00–19.00 |
| August | 9.00–20.00 | 9.00–19.00 |
| September | 9.00–19.00 | 9.00–18.00 |
| October | 9.00–17.30 | 9.00–17.30 |
| November | 9.00–16.30 | 9.00–16.30 |
| December | 9.00–16.30 | 9.00–16.30 |

== Burials ==
Notable interments include:

- A plot dedicated to the 24th Polish Lancers Regiment and their families
- Luranah Aldridge, English opera singer.
- Denzil Batchelor, British journalist, writer, playwright and broadcaster.
- Stanley Bate, English pianist and composer
- Tadeusz Bór-Komorowski, Polish general, during World War II, commander of the Warsaw Uprising and Polish Commander-in-Chief. Reburied in Powazki Military Cemetery, Warsaw, in 1994.
- Hugh Burden, British actor and playwright
- William Davison, 1st Baron Broughshane
- Charles Benjamin Dowse, 8th Bishop of Killaloe
- Matila Costiesco Ghyka, Romanian prince, novelist, mathematician, historian, philosopher and diplomat
- George Humphreys, British civil engineer
- Robin Hyde, New Zealand poet, novelist and journalist
- Harold Brownlow Martin, Australian pilot on the Dambuster raid
- Charles Langbridge Morgan, British playwright and novelist
- John Ogdon, English pianist and composer
- Vera Page, victim of an unresolved murder
- Carol Reed, English film director
- Hubert Ripka, member of the Czechoslovak Government 1940-1948
- Prince Vsevolod Ivanovich of Russia
- Kazimierz Sabbat, Prime Minister and President of Poland in Exile
- Kazimierz Sawicki
- Dr Hans Henrik Bruun, engineer, barrister
- Matthew Smith, English painter
- Marda Vanne, South African actress
- Aston Webb, English architect
- Saeed Jaffrey, British-Indian Actor, OBE (1995), Padma Shri (2016, posthumously)
- Dixie Henderson, wife of Dickie Henderson, formerly Dixie Jewell Ross in an American trio of singers and dancers the Ross Sisters
