= Matila Ghyka =

Romanian Naval officer and philosopher

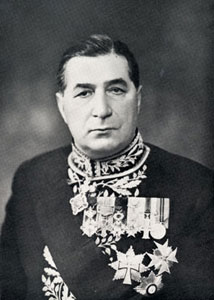
- Born: 13 September 1881; Iași, Romania
- Died: 14 July 1965 (aged 83); London, England
- Resting place: Gunnersbury Cemetery, London
- Education: École Navale; Université libre de Bruxelles
- Occupations: Naval officer, diplomat, writer, mathematician, aesthetician, historian
- Spouse: Eileen O'Conor
- Children: 2
- Awards: Royal Victorian Order; Military Cross

Prince Matila Costiescu Ghyka (Romanian pronunciation: [maˈtila ˈɟika]; born Matila Costiescu; 13 September 1881 – 14 July 1965), was a Romanian naval officer, novelist, mathematician, historian, philosopher, academic and diplomat. He did not return to Romania after World War II, and was one of the most significant members of the Romanian diaspora. His first name is sometimes written as Matyla.

== Life ==
Ghyka was born in Iași, the former capital of Moldavia, of the Ghica family of boyars. His mother was Maria Ghyljia and his father was Matila Costiecu, a Wallachian officer. Maria's half-brother was Grigoire Ghyka, who adopted Matila when he was a teenager so that he would acquire the title of Prince as Matila was the great-grandson of Grigore Alexandru Ghica, last reigning Prince of Moldavia before the union of the Danubian Principalities. However, much of Ghyka's inherited capital was via his grandmother's Balş family.

As a boy he lived in France studying first at the Salesian Order school in Paris, then a Jesuit college in Jersey where he became interested in mathematics. In his early teens he was a cadet at the French Naval Academy in Brest, and of the last generation in the old sailing ship Borda. He became a French Navy midshipman and made a cruise in a frigate to the Caribbean. In later years he attended the École supérieure d'électricité de Paris, and finally took a doctorate in law at the Université libre de Bruxelles.

Ghyka entered the Romanian Navy as a junior officer, serving mainly on the Danube. He was also involved in taking newly constructed river gunboats from the Thames Iron Works to Romania via European waterways. During the First World War he was Romanian Navy liaison officer on the Russian cruiser Rostislav, acting as a shore bombardment director along the Black Sea coast. He had joined the diplomatic service in 1909, being stationed at the Romanian Legations in Rome, Berlin, London, Madrid, Paris, Vienna, Stockholm (as Minister Plenipotentiary) and twice again in London between 1936-1938 and between 1939 and 1940.

In 1918, at the Brompton Oratory, he married Eileen O'Conor (1897–1963), daughter of the late Sir Nicholas Roderick O'Conor (d. 1908), the former British Ambassador to Istanbul and Saint Petersburg, and Minna Margaret Hope-Scott. Eileen belonged to a junior branch of the Ó Conchobhair Donn, who had anciently been Kings of Connacht. During his first diplomatic assignments in London and Paris, Prince Ghyka was introduced by Paul Morand and Prince Antoine Bibesco to the English and French literary circles. He became a friend of Marcel Proust and a "piéton de Paris" with the poet Léon-Paul Fargue. A frequent visitor of Natalie Clifford Barney's literary salon, he also met most of the American "exiled" writers of the 1920s, but his chief interest was always the synthesis of high mathematics and poetry.

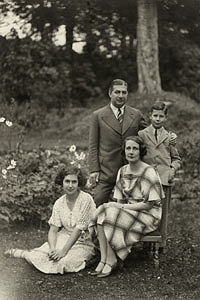
Matila Ghyka with family in 1935

After World War II, Ghyka fled Communist Romania, and was visiting professor of aesthetics in the United States, at the University of Southern California and at the Mary Washington College, Virginia.

Ghyka published his memoirs in two volumes in French, Escales de ma jeunesse (1955) and Heureux qui, comme Ulysse… (1956) under the collective title Couleur du monde; a shortened and revised version appeared in English in 1961 as The World Mine Oyster.

Ghyka died in London and was survived by his son, Prince Roderick Ghyka, and daughter, Princess Maureen Ghyka. He was predeceased by his wife Eileen, who died on 10 February 1963. Both Prince Matila and Princess Eileen are buried in Gunnersbury Cemetery, London. Their funeral monument was restored in 2010 by art historian Dr Radu Varia.

== Mathematical aesthetics ==
In around 1900, Ghyka spent a year studying engineering at the École supérieure d'électricité de Paris, Whilst there he developed his own mathematical ideas on the relationship between thermodynamics and living matter, partly under the influence of Gustave Le Bon. He returned to mathematics around 1920 when Albert Einstein's theories were published, and over the next few years developed ideas on the mathematics of form which he published in 1927 as Esthétique des proportions dans la nature et dans les arts, and revised and expanded in his two volume Le nombre d'or. Rites et rythmes pythagoriciens dans le development de la civilisation occidentale in 1931. Ghyka developed a personal philosophy in which all living things were endowed with an energy and functioned with a rhythm related to that of the golden ratio. Further work was published in French as Essai sur le rythme (1938), Tour d'horizon philosophique (1946) and Philosophie et Mystique du nombre (1952), and in English as The Geometry of Art and Life (1946). Around 1945 Ghyka was offered a visiting Professorship at the University of Southern California in Los Angeles because the President of the university had read Esthétique des proportions, and this was followed in 1947 by a job in the Art Department of Mary Washington College, where he taught his personal aesthetic theories for three years. In 1950 he returned to his wife at their family home in Dublin and his Practical Handbook of Geometry and Design was published in 1952.

Salvador Dalí possessed two copy of Ghyka's books which was read by theatre director Peter Brook, who was profoundly influenced by Ghyka's ideas on the mathematical relationships between classical art and the human body. The only monograph on his life and work appeared in Romanian.

== Works ==
- Contes marécageux; unpublished juvenilia c1900.
- Esthétique des proportions dans la nature et dans les arts (1927) (printed in Italian, Russian, Spanish)
- Le nombre d'or. Rites et rythmes pythagoriciens dans le development de la civilisation occidentale (1931) which ran into many editions and was prefaced by his friend and admirer Paul Valéry (translated into Italian, Czech, Spanish, Polish, English, Romanian)
- Pluie d'étoiles (1933) (English as Again One Day, 1936) - the only novel Ghyka wrote, printed also in Romanian
- Essai sur le rythme (1938)
- Sortilèges du verbe (1949), prefaced by Léon-Paul Fargue
- A Documented Chronology of Roumanian History from Pre-historic Times to the Present Day (1941), printed also in Romanian
- The Geometry of Art and Life (1946) (translated into Chinese - 2014 and Japanese - 2021)
- Tour d'horizon philosophique (1946)
- A Practical Handbook of Geometry and Design (1952)
- Philosophie et Mystique du nombre (1952) (translated into Serbian, Spanish, Romanian)
- Couleur du monde (1: Escales de ma jeunesse (1955), 2: Heureux qui comme Ulysse (1956)) (translated into Romanian)
- The World Mine Oyster. London, Heinemann, 1961 (English version of "Couleur du monde")
