= Roche Lynch =

British forensic scientist (1889–1957)

Roche Lynch OBE
- Born: Gerald Roche Lynch; 12 January 1889; Notting Hill, London
- Died: 3 July 1957 (aged 68); Slough, Berkshire
- Education: St Paul's School, London
- Alma mater: St Mary's Hospital Medical School
- Occupation: forensic scientist
- Years active: 1913–1954

Gerald Roche Lynch OBE FRIC DPH (12 January 1889 – 3 July 1957) was a British forensic scientist and public health analyst associated with several infamous murders as a medico-legal expert. An expert on poisons he appeared as an expert witness in multiple murder cases in the 20th century.

He was an important contributor to the "Bastardy (Blood Tests) Bill" of 1939, concluding that blood tests could accurately prove paternity (the accuracy was much less than modern DNA testing).

== Life ==
Roche Lynch was born in Notting Hill, London, on 12 January 1889, the son of Dr Jordan Roche Lynch. He was educated at St Paul's School, London then studied medicine with a scholarship to St Mary's Hospital Medical School in London from 1906. He graduated MB in 1913.

In the First World War he served as an assistant physician with the Royal Navy. Afterwards he worked with Sir William Willcox and in 1920 (aged only 31) replaced him representing the Home Office in officially assisting the CID in criminal investigations involving poison, bringing him frequently to work alongside Sir Bernard Spilsbury. He became director of chemical pathology at St Mary's Hospital on behalf of the Home Office in 1936. He served as president of the Royal Institute of Chemistry from 1946 to 1949.

He retired in 1954, and died at his home in Slough on 3 July 1957, aged 68.

== Notable Cases ==
- Browne and Kennedy's murder of PC Gutteridge (1928)
- Edmund Duff / Violet Sydney (1928)
- Sidney Fox (1930)
- Sarah Ann Everard (aka Annie Hearn) (1931)
- Murder of Edith Rosse by Maundy Gregory (1932)
- Vera Page (1932)
- Brighton trunk murders (1934)
- Ethel Major (1934)
- Charlotte Bryant (1936)
- Dorothea Waddingham (1936)
- Cheltenham torso mystery (1938)
- The unsolved William Murfitt murder (1938)
- August Sangret (1943)

== Publications ==
- Cases of Poisoning and Suspected Poisoning (1927)
- Evidence of Blood Groups (1933)
- Poisons and Their Detection (1935)
- Blood Group Tests in Disputed Paternity (1937)
- Toxicology: Homicidal, Suicidal and Accidental Poisoning

== Family ==
In 1919, he married Sybil Marguerite Pinnock who died very young. They had a daughter, Bridget Roche Lynch.

== In popular culture ==
Lynch was portrayed by Stephen Hancock in the Granada Television series Lady Killers, in an episode depicting the trial of Charlotte Bryant.
