= Great Pearl Robbery =

Jewelry robbery

- Advert promising a reward for information on the whereabouts of the stolen pearl necklace
- Date: 16 July 1913
- Time: 8.30 AM
- Location: Hatton Garden
- Outcome: Recovery of all but 1 of the stolen pearls
- Suspects: Joseph Grizzard; James Lockett; Simon Silverman; Leiser Gutwirth; James McCarthy
- Convicted: Joseph Grizzard; James Lockett; Simon Silverman; Leiser Gutwirth

In 1913, a necklace of 61 pearls was stolen in what later became known as the Great Pearl Robbery. (Note: There was no element of force or fear used or threatened and so legally the crime was a theft not a robbery, but this nickname stuck nevertheless.) It led to the largest claim from a jewellery policy at Lloyd's of London.

== The necklace ==
Known as the "Mona Lisa of pearls", the necklace was a string of 61 flawless blue-pink pearls with a diamond clasp, and had been created over a period of ten years, due to the time it took to source the pearls and match them. The centrepiece featured a large pearl that had once belonged to the royal family of Portugal. It was regarded at the time as the most valuable necklace in the world, and worth more than the Hope Diamond.

The necklace was later bought at a Paris auction for £123,000 (equivalent to £12,270,923 in 2025) by Hatton Garden jewellery dealer Max Mayer, who had it insured by Lloyds for £135,000 (equivalent to £13,468,086 in 2025).

== The robbers ==
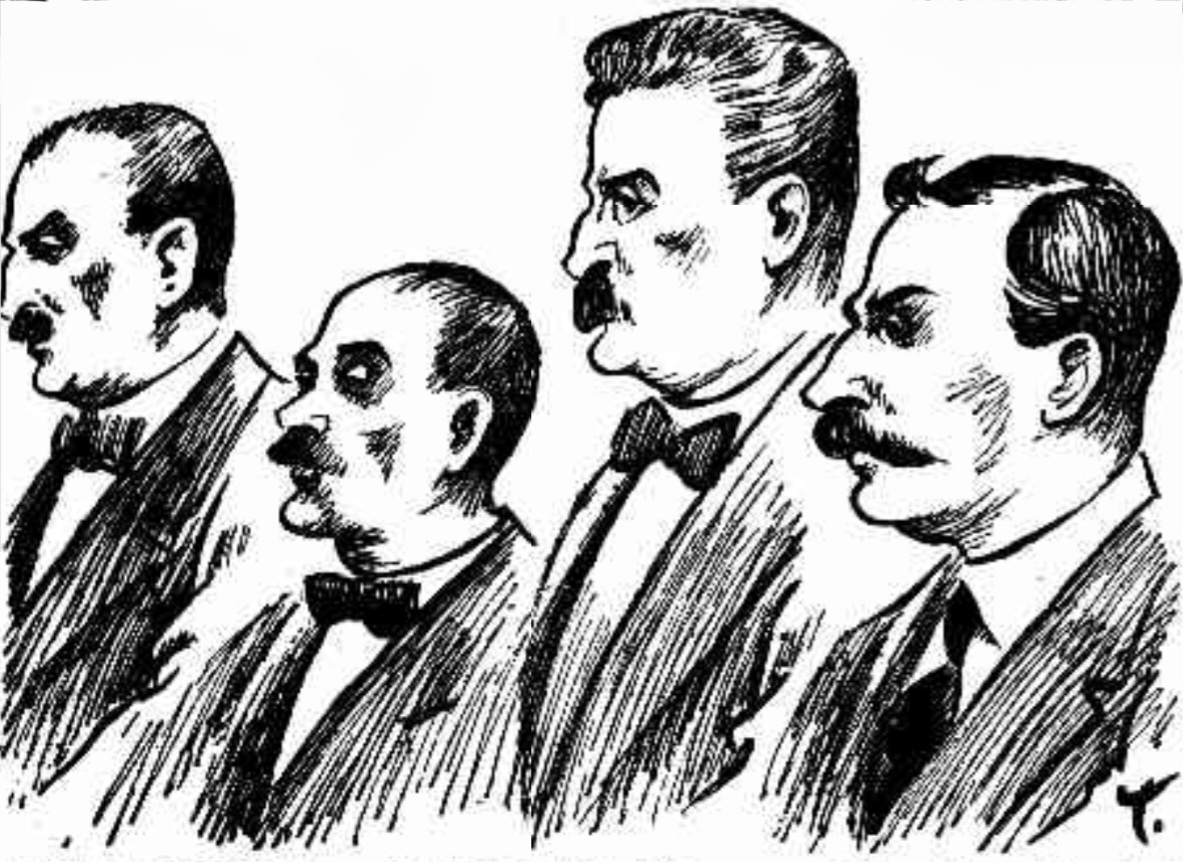
A court sketch of the gang: from left to right: Leiser Gutwirth, Simon Silverman, Joseph Grizzard, James Lockett

=== Joseph Grizzard ===
Joseph Grizzard, also known as "Cammi", or the "King of Fences", was born in 1867 to an Austrian-Jewish family living in London. Although he worked as a legitimate diamond dealer, his illicit activities as a fence made him well known to Scotland Yard, corroborated by statements by prisoners who said that they had disposed of their gains through him, however, they were not able to arrest him due to lack of evidence. He gained notoriety for his heists, mainly of jewellery, and was known for his charming, debonair manner, most famously smoking a cigar whilst police officers interrupted a dinner party to search his home for a stolen diamond necklace, only to retrieve it from the bottom of his soup bowl once the officers left empty-handed.

=== James Lockett ===
James Lockett was a jeweller, burglar, and Grizzard's main collaborator. Although he had been arrested many times, he was able to always receive a short sentence by giving a false name, and was thus viewed as a "first-time offender" each time in the eyes of the police.

=== Simon Silverman ===
Simon Silverman was a diamond dealer, born in Vienna.

=== Leiser Gutwirth ===
Leiser Gutwirth was born in Cracow, then part of the Austrian Empire, moving to London in 1893, and establishing himself as a dealer in precious stones, gaining a good reputation.

== The robbery ==
=== Preceding events ===
Max Mayer sent the necklace to a trusted agent, Henri Salomans, at his Paris branch, with a view to selling it for £150,000 (equivalent to £14,964,540 in 2025). However, the sale did not go through, and Salomans returned the necklace by registered post. According to his wife, he first wrapped the necklace in cotton wool, then tissue paper. He placed this into a 10" by 8" white wood Morocco plush-lined case. The case was then wrapped in cotton wool and tissue paper, and placed into a cardboard box. The box was then wrapped in brown paper, tied with string, and sealed in several places with seven wax seals with Max Mayer's "MM" monogram. Salomans then took it to the adjoining Post Office, where he was well known, registering it for London.

=== The theft ===
Joseph "Cammi" Grizzard, a prominent jewel fence, planned their theft. Simon Silverman, one of the gang, rented an office at 101 Hatton Garden, on the same postal route as Mayer's office (located at 88 Hatton Garden, now occupied by jewellers E. Katz & Co.). He studied the route and habits of the postman, W. E. Neville, whom he befriended, noting the time that he arrived and the length of time his deliveries took. He then had imitation seals produced in the style of Mayer's - three of these imitations are now in the Metropolitan Police's Crime Museum. Grizzard and an accomplice, James Lockett, stalked Max Mayer and listened in on his business lunches, eventually learning when the necklace would be returned by post.

Neville was then bribed with £400 (equivalent to £39,905 in 2025) in exchange for the gang receiving the parcel instead of Mayer. On 16 July, Neville received the parcel and delivered it to Silverman's office. Upon delivery, Silverman and a fellow gang member opened it, removed the pearls, added sugar lumps, wrapped it in blue linen paper similar to that used by Mayer, and resealed it using the duplicate monogrammed seals they had had made. It was then returned to Neville's postbag, and delivered to Mayer.

=== Aftermath ===
Max Mayer discovered the theft upon opening the parcel. He then telegraphed Henri Salomans "Box arrived, but no necklace." Salomans rang Mayer in London, but due to the bad quality of the line, was not able to fully understand, leading him to catch an afternoon train from Gare du Nord to London via a boat-train in order to clear up the matter.

Meanwhile, Mayer contacted Lloyds, who contacted Scotland Yard. Chief Inspector Alfred Ward, a respected detective who had helped in bringing Frederick Seddon to justice the previous year, and Detective Sergeant Cornish were assigned to the case. Price and Gibbs, the assessors for Lloyds, called on Alfred Leach to investigate the theft. Leach was an ex-Superintendent who had worked in the Hatton Garden area for years, and knew Grizzard and his gang well (although it was not known that they were the culprits at the time). He had retired from the police in 1908 due to ill health, becoming a private detective for the underwriters of Lloyd's, working mainly with Price and Gibbs.

When Salomans arrived at Charing Cross at 10.30 pm that night, he was met by Mayer, Ward, Cornish, Leach, and Frank Beaumont Price, senior partner of Price and Gibbs, along with several other Scotland Yard officers. The party journeyed to Scotland Yard together, and spent the night and part of the following morning discussing the case.

== Investigation and arrests ==
Price and Gibbs, the assessors for Lloyds, offered a reward of £10,000 (equivalent to £997,636 in 2025) for information leading to the return of the necklace. Samuel Brandstatter, a French-Belgian diamond dealer, met with Leiser Gutwirth (the two being distantly related) in Antwerp. Gutwirth, also a diamond dealer, made oblique references to a big deal that he had on hand. Meeting again with Brandstatter the next day, he enquired whether he was able to make a deal worth 1.5 million francs (equivalent to fr.473,754,047 in 2025). Having seen the advert from Lloyd's, Brandstatter quickly realised that Gutwirth was referring to the necklace. Gutwirth also revealed that the necklace was in the hands of the gang in London, and was intact, minus the diamond clasp. Brandstatter wrote to Gutwirth ten days later claiming that he had a prospective buyer for the necklace. He was then invited to London. Brandstatter revealed the plan to a cousin, Myer Cohen Quadratstein, whom, when they met with Gutwirth and Silverman in London on 15 August, was introduced as someone who knew of a likely buyer for the necklace. The group then travelled to Canonbury, where Gutwirth's house was, and were introduced to Joseph Grizzard, who Quadratstein was familiar with, knowing his reputation and having bought from once in the past in an honest transaction. An appointment was made for the next day, at Quadratstein's request, for Quadratstein and Brandstatter to examine the pearls.

The group - Gutwirth, Silverman, Grizzard, and the two amateur detectives - met at a tea room in Holborn (after first visiting several other places to ensure that they were not watched) and sat at a table furthest from the door. After ordering refreshments, they were joined by James Lockett. With Grizzard's usual love for theatrics, he produced a cigarette and requested a match from Lockett. Lockett tossed a matchbox on the table, which Grizzard opened to reveal three of the pearls, from the centerpiece of Mayer's necklace, worth £10,000. Quadratstein and Brandstatter examined the pearls, and (with Grizzard's permission) weighed them in a neighbouring dining room in order to compare the weights with those on the advert. Knowing that the pearls were indeed from the stolen necklace, they then agreed to meet again on 22 August at the First Avenue Hotel in Holborn.

The pair then booked rooms at the Great Eastern Hotel and contacted Frank Price, and together got a Paris pearl merchant, Max Spanier, who was a friend of Max Mayer to pose as a buyer for the pearls. He was given 100,000 francs in marked notes in order to buy some of the pearls. Several meetings took place at the First Avenue Hotel, and Spanier was able to buy two of the pearls for £4000 (equivalent to £399,054 in 2025).

With now enough evidence to arrest the gang, the police arranged to apprehend them at the First Avenue Hotel. However Grizzard became suspicious, leading to Spanier pulling out. Price, Quadratstein, and Brandstatter invented an Indian rajah to take his place. Following a couple of aborted meetings, the police arrested Grizzard, Silverman, and Lockett at Chancery Lane underground station on 2 September. Gutwirth was arrested the same day at his Hatton Garden office. However, it was discovered that none of the gang had the pearls on them.

The gang appeared in court on 10 September. The jury returned a verdict of "guilty" against all four within 11 minutes. Grizzard and Lockett were sentenced to seven years penal servitude, Silverman to five years, and Gutwirth to 18 months hard labour. A fifth suspect, an 82-year old named James McCarthy, also arrested in the sting operation at the underground, was acquitted at the trial, it being determined that he was uninvolved.

== Recovery of the pearls ==
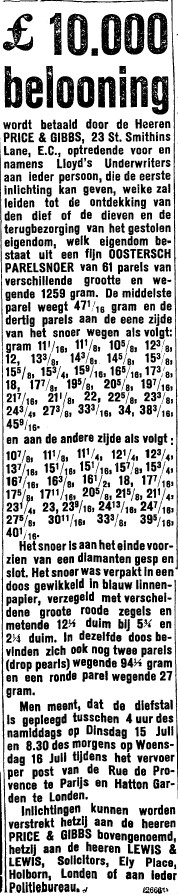
Dutch advertisement promising a reward for information on the whereabouts of the stolen pearl necklace

Two weeks after the arrests, a piano-back maker named Augustus Horne discovered a box in the gutter of a Highbury street. Opening it, he found a matchbox containing all of the pearls (except those bought by Spanier).

Assuming them to be imitation pearls, one account states that he gave one to a homeless child to use as a marble before handing the rest in to the police. This account did not appear in the press at the time, which instead stated that he had taken all of them to his nearest police station, where all but one of them were booked in as imitations, sent to Scotland Yard and there identified by Mayer as his. On his way to the station one had fallen out into Horne's pocket - he found it later (but before hearing that it was a real pearl), tried to exchange it for drinks at a pub, and on being refused threw it into the gutter. This is also the account given by the 1929 book The Great Pearl Robbery of 1913: A Record of Fact by noted judge Christmas Humphreys and in the memoir of George William Cornish, who served on the investigation as a Detective Sergeant.

The Lutine Bell was rung to celebrate the pearls' return.
