= Christopher Hancock =

British actor (1928–2004)

- Hancock as Charlie Cotton in EastEnders
- Born: Christopher Anthony Arthur Hancock; 5 June 1928; Bishop Auckland, County Durham, England
- Died: 29 September 2004 (aged 76); Lincolnshire, England
- Education: Old Vic Theatre School
- Occupation: Actor
- Years active: 1969–2000
- Television: EastEnders (1986–1990)
- Spouse: Ann Walford (divorced)
- Children: 2
- Relatives: Stephen Hancock (brother)

Christopher Anthony Arthur Hancock (5 June 1928 – 29 September 2004) was an English television and theatre actor. He was born in Bishop Auckland, County Durham, England. His brother was actor Stephen Hancock. He trained at the Old Vic Theatre School. He was married to Ann Walford; the couple had two daughters before divorcing.

Hancock began acting in the theatre in the 1950s and he had roles in plays such as Richard II and Measure for Measure (both 1965) and the musical Billy (Theatre Royal, Drury Lane, 1974).

He was then best known for playing conman Charlie Cotton in the popular BBC soap opera EastEnders from 1986 until 1990. His character was killed off in July 1991 but his death was not shown on-screen. He also appeared in other television series such as Z-Cars, Softly, Softly, The Gaffer, The Upper Hand and The Bill.

He reprised his EastEnders role as Charlie Cotton briefly in a special spin-off episode titled "Return of Nick Cotton" where he appeared as Charlie's ghost in October 2000. He died in 2004 of a heart attack at the age of 76 in Lincolnshire.

== Selected filmography ==
- The Six Wives of Henry VIII (1970) – Sir Henry Norreys
- Elizabeth R (1971) – Idiaquez
- Casanova (1971) – Cicospetto
- Z-Cars (1971) – Fraser / (1977) – Dr. Villiers
- Softly, Softly (1972) – Meadows
- Crown Court (1974)
- Love for Lydia (1977) – Mr Richardson
- Cribb (1980) – Mr Strathamore
- The Gaffer (1981–1982) – Wagstaff
- EastEnders (1986–1990) – Charlie Cotton
- Little Dorrit (1988) – Customer at Coffee House
- The Mirror Crack'd (1992) – Arthur Badcock
- Casualty (1993) – Ted Springett
- The Upper Hand (1993) – Mr. Tanner
- The Bill (2 episodes, 1993–1994) as Ivor Thomas (1993) / Mr. Clarke (1994)
- Return of Nick Cotton (2000) – Charlie Cotton
