= Cheltenham torso mystery =

Unidentified body found in England in 1938

The Cheltenham torso mystery began with the discovery of the torso of an unknown man in the River Severn in 1938. Forensic analysis by Sir Bernard Spilsbury suggested that the body was that of Captain Butt of Cheltenham, but the case was never officially resolved.

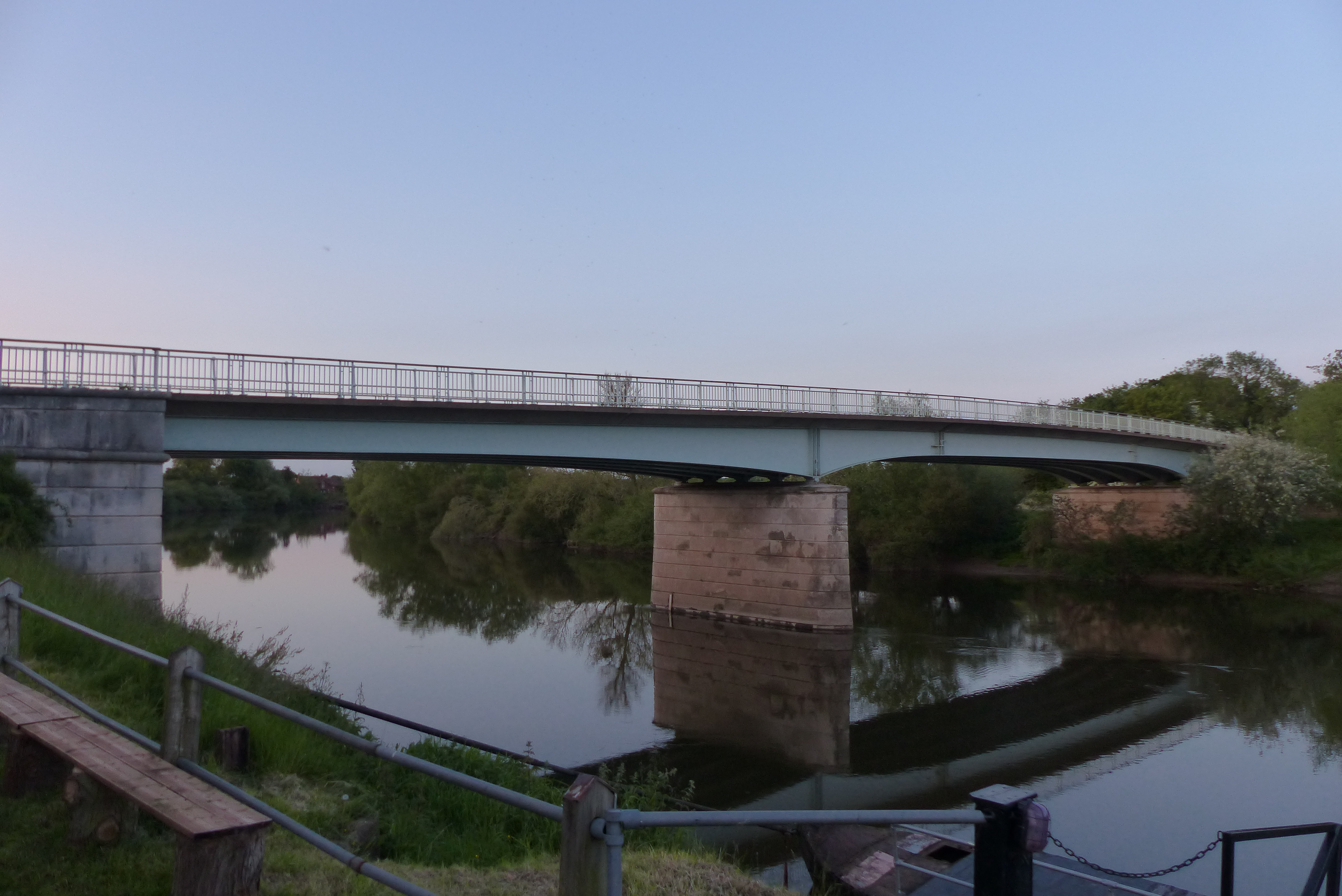
English: Haw Bridge. Situated on the part of the river where the torso was found.

A man's torso was found by fishermen in the Severn near Haw Bridge, Tewkesbury, Gloucestershire, on 3 February 1938. Dragging the river turned up two legs and two handless arms. The body was thought to be that of Captain William Bernard Butt, aged 52, of 248, Old Bath Road, Cheltenham, who had been missing since January. Sir Bernard Spilsbury carried out a post-mortem on the torso and other remains: he considered that they were parts of the same body and found several points of similarity with the missing Captain. Dr Roche Lynch also assisted in the investigation.

Brian Sullivan, a 27-year-old dancer, the son of a nurse who looked after Butt's invalid wife, had committed suicide at his mother's home at Tower Lodge, Leckhampton, a few days after the Captain's disappearance and his blood-stained overcoat was found under the floorboards there.

Extensive searches failed to find the head and hands of the body, and the inquest left the identity of the remains and cause of death officially undetermined.
