= Peter Geddis =

English actor (1937–2018)

Peter Geddis (1937–2018) was an English actor.

He played Larry Wolstenhulme in Coronation Street (1960), first gangleader in BBC Play of the Month (1965), Beg-gar in the television miniseries Wessex Tales (1973), Mr. Gresty in The Last Vampyre (1992), directed by Tim Sullivan, and racist detective in New Tricks.

He performed several William Shakespeare's plays, including the messenger to Cordelia in King Lear (1962), by Peter Brook, Lancelot Gobbo in The Merchant of Venice (1971), directed by Terry Hands, and Michael in Arden of Faversham (1970), directed by Buzz Goodbody, for the Royal Shakespeare Company.

On films he played Raymus Antilles in Star Wars: Episode IV A New Hope (1977), Butler in Who Dares Wins (1982), and station master in Killing Dad (1989).
