= Roger Llewellyn =

British actor

Roger Charles Llewellyn (14 May 1945 – 17 April 2018) was a British actor born in Swansea.

== Biography ==
He played Sherlock Holmes in 1997, 2007 and 2008 in stage versions of The Hound of the Baskervilles, Sherlock Holmes The Last Act and The Death and Life of Sherlock Holmes. In 2009 he played Sherlock Holmes again in the Big Finish Sherlock Holmes audio series in the stories The Last Act and The Death and Life. In 1981, he played Mr Dellow in the Granada Television series Lady Killers, in the episode "A Boy's Best Friend", which depicted the trial of Sidney Harry Fox.

Roger Charles Lewellyn's funeral service took place at St Michael and All Angels, Bedford Park, Chiswick on 10 May 2018, and his body was cremated the following day at Mortlake Crematorium.
