= Arthur Jacob (priest) =

Irish Anglican priest

Arthur Jacob D.D. was Archdeacon of Armagh from 1777 until his death in 1786.

Jacob was born in Kilkenny and educated at Trinity College, Dublin. He held livings at Killane, Clonkeen and Killeavy He was Treasurer of Leighlin from 1765 to 1771; Precentor of Armagh Cathedral from 1771 to 1775; and Prebendary of Tynan in there from 1775 to 1778.
