= Young Sherlock: The Mystery of the Manor House =

British television series

- Starring: Guy Henry
- Country of origin: United Kingdom
- Original language: English
- No. of series: 1
- No. of episodes: 8

Original release
- Release: 31 October – 12 December 1982

Young Sherlock: The Mystery of the Manor House is an 8-episode television series about the youthful years of Sherlock Holmes. The show was produced by Granada Television and premiered on 31 October 1982. Although there was no televised sequel to this story, Gerald Frow penned a follow-up for Granada's Dragon Books (who in 1982 published his novelisation of this tale). Young Sherlock: The Adventure at Ferryman's Creek went on sale in 1984.

== Premise ==
A young Sherlock Holmes returns home to find his family is bankrupt and have sold the manor house to strangers. His family have all moved to France, and Sherlock is forced to stay with an aunt and uncle in the area. While investigating the Turnbulls at the Manor House, he stumbles upon a conspiracy to kidnap Queen Victoria, substitute an imposter, and steal the Koh-i-noor diamond.

== Cast ==
- Guy Henry as Sherlock Holmes
- June Barry as Mrs. Turnbull
- Tim Brierley as John Whitney
- Donald Douglas as Colonel Turnbull
- Heather Chasen as Aunt Rachel
- John Fraser as Uncle Gideon
- Christopher Villiers as Jasper Moran
- Lewis Fiander as Ranjeet
- Eva Griffith as Charity
- Zuleika Robson as Charlotte Whitney
- David Futcher as Doctor Sowerbutts
- Raj Patel as Anil
- Jane Lowe as Mrs. Cunliffe
- Andrew Johns as Captain Cholmondeley
- Tom Chatto as Sergeant Grimshaw
- Ian McCurrach as Newbugs
- Brian Orrell as Albert Bates
- Michael Irwin as William Greasley

== Episodes ==
No.	Title	Directed by	Written by	Original release date
1	"The Young Master"	Nicholas Ferguson	Gerald Frow	31 October 1982
2	"The Gypsy Calls Again"	Nicholas Ferguson	Gerald Frow	7 November 1982
3	"The Riddle of the Dummies"	Nicholas Ferguson	Gerald Frow	14 November 1982
4	"A Singular Thorn"	Nicholas Ferguson	Gerald Frow	21 November 1982
5	"The Woman in Black"	Nicholas Ferguson	Gerald Frow	28 November 1982
6	"The Glasscutter's Hand"	Nicholas Ferguson	Gerald Frow	28 November 1982
7	"The Unexpected Visitors"	Nicholas Ferguson	Gerald Frow	5 December 1982
8	"The Eye of the Peacock"	Nicholas Ferguson	Gerald Frow	12 December 1982

== Home Media ==
Young Sherlock: The Mystery of the Manor House was released on DVD in the US by Goldhill Home Media in April 2003. The three-disk set contained all 8 episodes edited together into 3 longer episodes, one on each disk. The episodes were presented in a choice of Dolby Digital 2.0 or 5.1. There were no subtitles and the only extra was a photo gallery on each disk.
