= Charlotte Bryant =

British-Irish accused murderer (executed 1936)

- Born: Charlotte McHugh; 14 February 1903; Derry, Ireland
- Died: 15 July 1936 (aged 33); HM Prison Exeter, United Kingdom
- Resting place: HM Prison Exeter
- Spouse: Frederick Bryant
- Children: 5
- Conviction: Murder
- Criminal charges: Arsenic poisoning
- Penalty: Execution by hanging

Details
- Date: 23 December 1935
- Country: United Kingdom
- Location: Dorset
- Date apprehended: 10 February 1936

Charlotte Bryant (née McHugh; 14 February 1903 – 15 July 1936) was an Irish-born woman who was convicted of the poisoning murder of her husband in 1936. Bryant denied all involvement but was convicted under circumstantial evidence in what has been described as "one of the most unusual murder cases of the era." Her trial was held in Dorchester at the Shire Hall, where she was convicted within an hour by an all-male jury. She was the last woman sentenced to death in Dorset and became the last woman executed at HM Prison Exeter.

== Background ==
Charlotte Bryant was born on 14 February 1903 in Derry, Ireland, to John and Sarah McHugh. Known as "Lottie", she had three younger sisters, in a Roman Catholic family. She became an adult during the time of the Irish War of Independence when troops from the British Army had been sent to County Londonderry. It was here that she met her husband in 1922. Frederick John Bryant, known as Fred, was from the English county of Dorset and had served during World War I in the Dorsetshire Regiment. While serving he had been injured in Mesopotamia. They soon left Ireland and moved to England together.

The couple were married in Somerset, and moved to the nearby village of Nether Compton, where Frederick found employment becoming a cowhand. Charlotte however gained a reputation with the villagers as a promiscuous alcoholic, who knew her by the nicknames "Black Bess", "Compton Liz" and "Killarney Kate". Due to his low pay, Frederick was said to be unbothered by his wife engaging casually in prostitution to increase their income due to their financial problems. In 1923, Charlotte gave birth to a son named Ernest, followed two years later by a daughter named Lily. The paternity of their three youngest children was questioned.

In December 1933, the couple both attended a Christmas party together, and met gypsy horse-trader Leonard Edward Parsons. She invited him for Christmas dinner as he was alone. He became a regular visitor at the Bryants' family home and stayed occasionally as a lodger. Soon he started a relationship with Charlotte despite having four children with his common law wife, Priscilla Loveridge, at Weston-super-Mare. Due to the growing gossip about his wife's behaviour, Frederick's employer dismissed him from his job. This resulted in the Bryants losing their cottage and the family was forced to move elsewhere. He found a new job as a farmhand in Coombe, a hamlet near Sherborne, working for Aubrey Priddle. The large family was forced to downsize to a smaller cottage, and the tension and difficult living arrangements lead to Charlotte and Parsons moving out. As a travelling salesman Parsons would move around to sell different items. Parsons rented rooms in Dorchester but soon he and Charlotte returned to the family home. When Charlotte eventually found out about Parsons's other family, she insisted on accompanying him on travels. This was while her husband stayed at the farm to care for their children.

On 14 May 1935, the next-door neighbour Ethel Staunton heard Frederick wailing and clutching his stomach after eating a meal prepared by his wife. The doctor diagnosed him with gastroenteritis but four days later he had recovered and returned to work. On 7 August, the illness returned but he again made a recovery. After Charlotte had her fifth child, the relationship with Parsons deteriorated, and he permanently moved out in November 1935. As he was possibly the father of the baby, Charlotte spent hours searching for him and was highly distressed. With the economic pressures of the Great Depression, the Bryants were forced to take in a new paying lodger, 34-year-old Lucy Ostler, a widow with seven children. She and Charlotte formed a friendship and shared babysitting responsibilities. However, living conditions for the household were cramped in the small farm cottage with twelve children and three adults underneath one roof.

On 11 December 1935, Frederick experienced severe stomach pain, which prompted his wife to inquire about life insurance. On 15 December, Priddle complained about noise from the Bryant household, "can’t you keep those children quiet? How many families do you have?", to which Charlotte Bryant made a remark about shooting him.

== Murder investigation ==
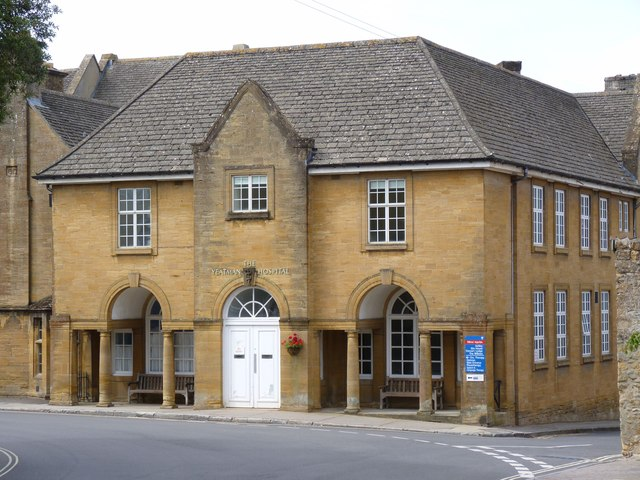
The Yeatman Hospital in Sherborne where Frederick Bryant died on 23 December 1935.

Shortly before Christmas 1935, Charlotte went with her newborn baby to the travellers' encampment at Weston-super-Mare where Loveridge lived in order to look for Parsons. She did not find him there and so confronted her lover's common law wife, claiming Parsons was the baby's father. When she returned to Coombe Farm her husband's illness had become more serious. That evening Charlotte slept with her baby in the same bed as Frederick, while their lodger, Lucy, rested in the same room. In the night, Lucy awoke to see Charlotte urging Frederick to drink some Oxo. This resulted in his condition worsening so Ernest was sent to fetch Priddle to call the hospital. The following day on 22 December 1935, Frederick Bryant died at Yeatman Hospital in Sherborne.

The doctor who attended was immediately suspicious, refusing to sign the death certificate, and scheduled an inquest for Christmas Eve. On 28 December, physician Roche Lynch, from the Home Office, reported Frederick's internal organs contained high levels of arsenic and determined that the fatal dose had been administered in a short period prior to death. A post mortem found the cause of death to be acute arsenical poisoning.

While the police carried out their investigations into the death of Frederick, the family was relocated temporarily to the Public Assistance Institution in the town of Sturminster Newton, a former workhouse. The Metropolitan Police sent Chief Inspector Bell and Detective Inspector Carter from London to assist the local police. The initial investigation involved a search of the cottage, which included the collection of 150 separate samples, of which 32 had traces of arsenic.

The police officers visited local chemists to examine shop registers to check who had made recent purchases of arsenic. A pharmacist in Yeovil recalled a woman who bought a tin of weedkiller who had signed his register using a cross instead of a name. As Charlotte was illiterate and had made a signature on her marriage certificate the same way, this was seen as a potential lead. However the Yeovil pharmacist failed to recognise either Charlotte or Lucy as the customer in an identity parade. On Boxing Day, Lucy claimed she had discovered ashes, pieces of burnt clothing and a tin under the boiler following a fire started by Charlotte. This tin was recovered as evidence by police in their search, and arsenic was detected in the ash. When Dorset Police tracked down Parsons with assistance from Scotland Yard, he admitted that he and Charlotte had an affair, but denied any involvement in her husband’s death.

The police felt they had enough evidence to arrest Charlotte and charged her with murder on 10 February 1936. As she was unable to pay for a barrister due to the family's poor financial situation, the court appointed J. D. Casswell as her defense counsel and she was provided with free legal aid. Casswell, an experienced criminal advocate, derided Charlotte as "an ugly Irish gypsy", but believed she was a good mother suffering in poverty, and was retrospectively sad that he was unable to save her from execution.

== Trial ==
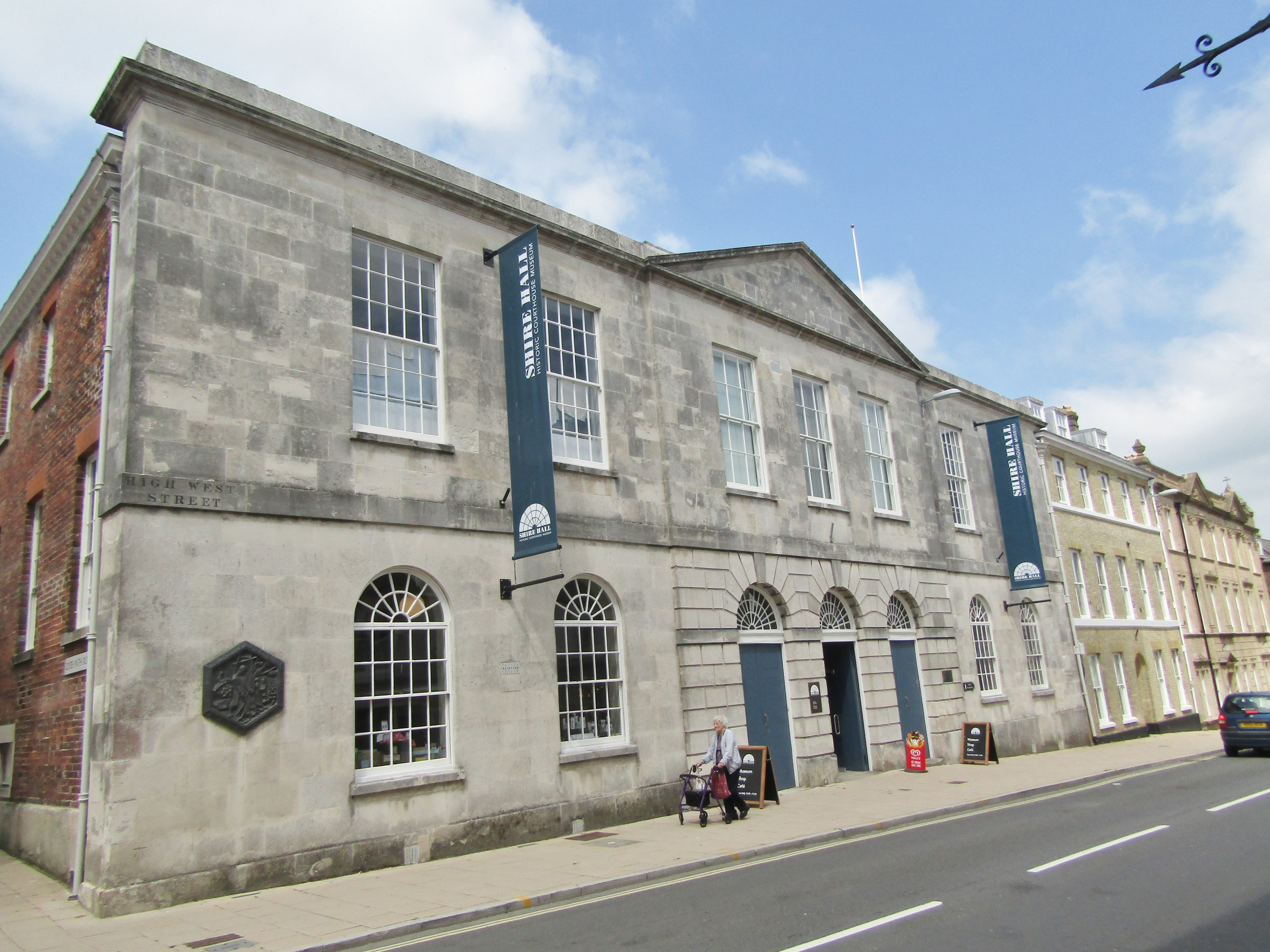
Shire Hall in Dorchester where the trial for the murder of Frederick Bryant was held.

Criminal proceedings began at Shire Hall on 27 May 1936 and lasted four days. For the prosecution, Terence O'Connor, KC was unable to definitively prove that Charlotte had been the one who purchased the poison. Lucy, who was living with the Bryants, testified against Charlotte. The case against Charlotte relied largely on her verbal testimony which retold the story of the drink of Oxo and the burned tin, and claims that she admitted to hating her husband.

Parsons was also asked to give evidence for the prosecution, and he admitted his intimate relationship with the defendant. On cross-examination, Casswell speculated that Lucy also had access to the same weedkiller in the household; however, this was disputed as she moved in with the Bryants after the earliest cases of sickness.

The strongest evidence for the prosecution was considered to be the testimony of Lynch, an expert in criminal investigations involving poison. His analysis of the ashes showed traces of arsenic, suggesting the tin had been burned in the fire. Lynch demonstrated how easily arsenic could be dissolved in Oxo. Casswell's questioning caused him to raise the possibility that Frederick may have consumed low traces of arsenic accidentally, though it would have been unlikely to be lethal.

When Charlotte was called to give evidence in her own defence, she vehemently denied possessing weedkiller and claimed she knew nothing about arsenic. She disputed that she had an affair with Parsons. She also alleged that Lucy had prepared the Oxo drink for her husband. When Charlotte's two eldest children took the stand they contradicted their mother's testimony.

It took just an hour for the all-male jury to reach a verdict and Charlotte was found guilty of the murder of her husband. It was reported that the voice of Justice Stuart McKinnon was shaky as he delivered her sentence of execution, to which Charlotte wept, "no, no, my Lord - I am not guilty". She fell down as she was taken away from the courtroom. Her defence counsel Casswell launched an immediate appeal against the sentence. Charlotte was the last female prisoner in Dorset to receive a death sentence, before the abolition of capital punishment in 1965.

== Imprisonment ==
A week after her sentencing, Casswell was approached by William Arthur Bone, an award-winning chemist, who questioned the forensic evidence which was used to convict Charlotte. As his client had been sentenced under circumstantial evidence, they met and Bone clarified that the typical composition of coal contains 140 parts of arsenic per million. This was slightly less than the 149 parts per million that were detected in the sample used as evidence. The appeal took place on 29 June 1936, but this new evidence was rejected, and her death sentence was upheld. Questions concerning the integrity of the murder trial and Charlotte's appeal were also raised by members of Parliament (MPs) in the House of Commons.

Charlotte began to learn to read and write with the help of the female warders at the prison. Her solicitors attempted to have her case taken to the House of Lords and an application was sent to the Attorney General which was rejected. Charlotte wrote a letter to the Home Secretary Sir John Simon appealing her death sentence.

She sent a telegram to King Edward VIII, begging for clemency: "Mighty King. Have pity on your lowly, afflicted subject. Don't let them kill me on Wednesday. From the brink of the cold, dark grave, I am a poor helpless woman. I ask you not to let them kill me. I am innocent." Charlotte was able to see her children in prison, but she refused any visits to prevent traumatising them. While awaiting execution, it was reported that her appearance changed drastically with her black hair turning completely white.

== Execution ==
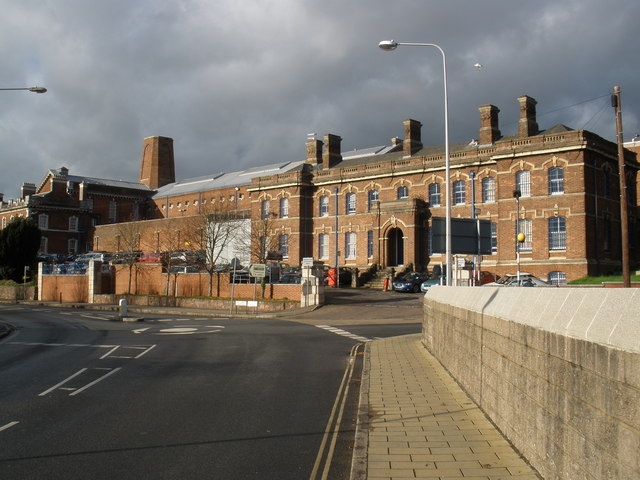
HM Prison Exeter, where Charlotte Bryant was executed in 1936

Charlotte was executed on Wednesday 15 July 1936. The executioner Thomas Pierrepoint was responsible for the hanging, which had an audience of 1,000 people who stood outside in torrential rain. Among them were protesters, including anti-capital punishment campaigner Violet Van der Elst. She was fined by the police and stated she would start a fund for the orphans of individuals who have been killed or executed. Charlotte's five children were taken into care by Dorset County Council. She left just five shillings and eight pence to them.

== Legacy ==
"Charlotte Bryant was nothing like the conventional picture of the wronged heroine. She had neither charm nor any other attraction. By the time I saw her in the cells beneath the Assize court at Dorchester, her face was prematurely scarred with lines, her dark hair fell in rats’ tails, and a solitary tooth showed behind her lips"

— J. D. Casswell, 1961

In 1961, Casswell wrote about the case in his book A Lance for Liberty. The criminal historian Dr Nell Darby challenged Charlotte's portrayal as a sexual deviant and believes she was a victim of classism due to her working class background; "although Charlotte’s affair was brought up in court, it was not done so to depict her as a slut, or as an evil woman, but mentioned as part of a prosecution case to suggest that because Charlotte was in a relationship with Parsons, in love with him, and wanted to marry him, she was motivated to kill her husband.”

The case has been researched by true crime author Prash Ganendran. The letters that Charlotte wrote while imprisoned are archived by the National Justice Museum. In 2022, the story of Charlotte's life was in an exhibition at Shire Hall where her trial had taken place.

In 1980, the case was depicted in the episode "Don't Let Them Kill Me on Wednesday" of the Granada Television series Lady Killers, with Charlotte being played by Rita Tushingham. In 2018, the case was featured in the first episode of the BBC series Murder, Mystery and My Family.
