= Murder of Julia Martha Thomas =

Notorious murder from March 1879

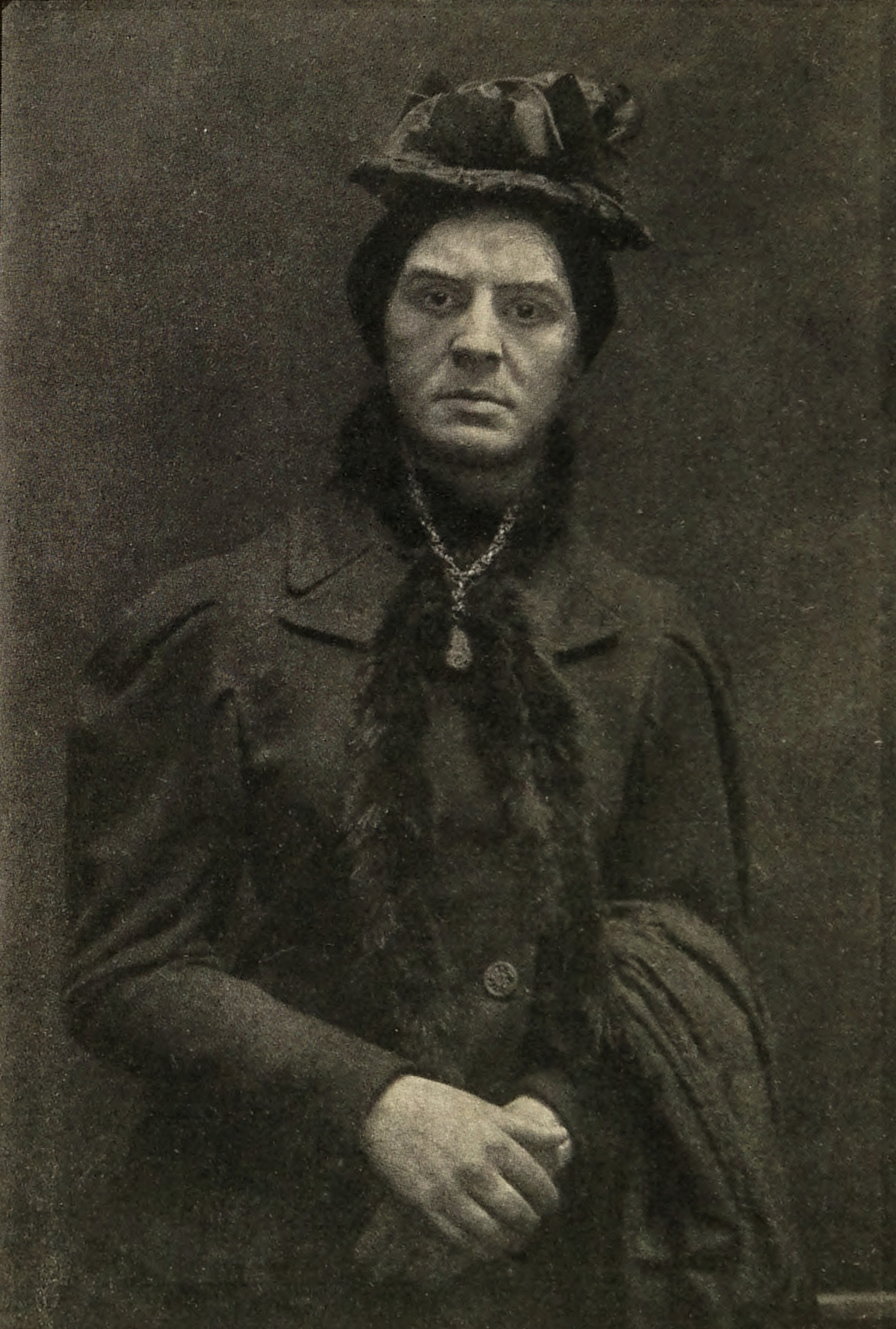
Madame Tussauds wax sculpture of Kate Webster

The murder of Julia Martha Thomas, dubbed the "Barnes Mystery" or the "Richmond Murder" by the contemporary press, was one of the most notorious crimes in the Victorian period of the United Kingdom. Thomas, a widow in her 50s who lived in Richmond, London, was murdered on 2 March 1879 by her maid Kate Webster, a 30-year-old Irishwoman with a history of theft. Webster disposed of the body by dismembering it, boiling the flesh off the bones, and throwing most of the remains into the River Thames.

It was alleged, although never proven, that Webster had offered the fat from Thomas's body to a publican, neighbours and street children as dripping and lard. Part of Thomas's remains were subsequently recovered from the river. Her severed head remained missing until October 2010, when the skull was found during building works being carried out for Sir David Attenborough.

After the murder, Webster posed as Thomas for two weeks but was exposed and fled back to Ireland at her uncle's home at Killanne near Enniscorthy, County Wexford. She was arrested there on 29 March and was returned to London, where she stood trial at the Old Bailey in July 1879. At the end of a six-day trial, Webster was convicted and sentenced to death after a jury of matrons rejected her last-minute attempt to avoid the death penalty by pleading pregnancy. She finally confessed to the murder the night before she was hanged, on 29 July at Wandsworth Prison. The case attracted huge public interest and was widely covered by the press in both Britain and Ireland. Webster's behaviour after the crime and during the trial further increased the notoriety of the murder.

== Background ==
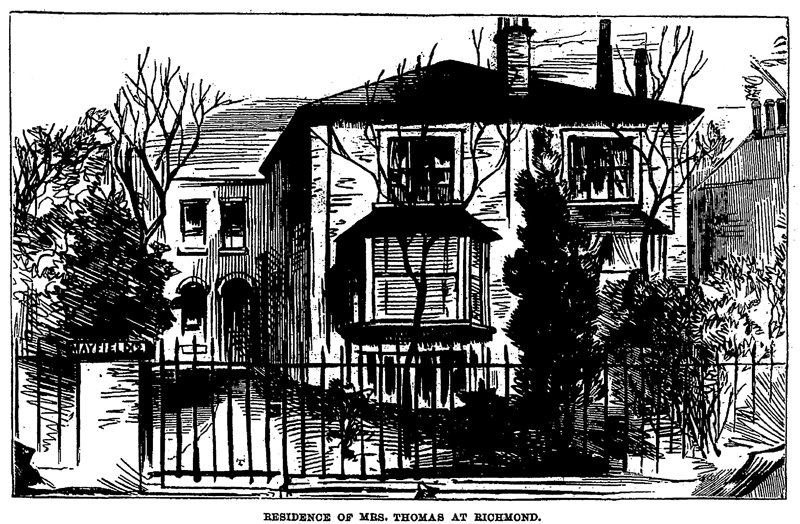
Mayfield Cottages, Julia Martha Thomas's house in Richmond. She lived in the left-hand portion (number 2) of the semi-detached villa

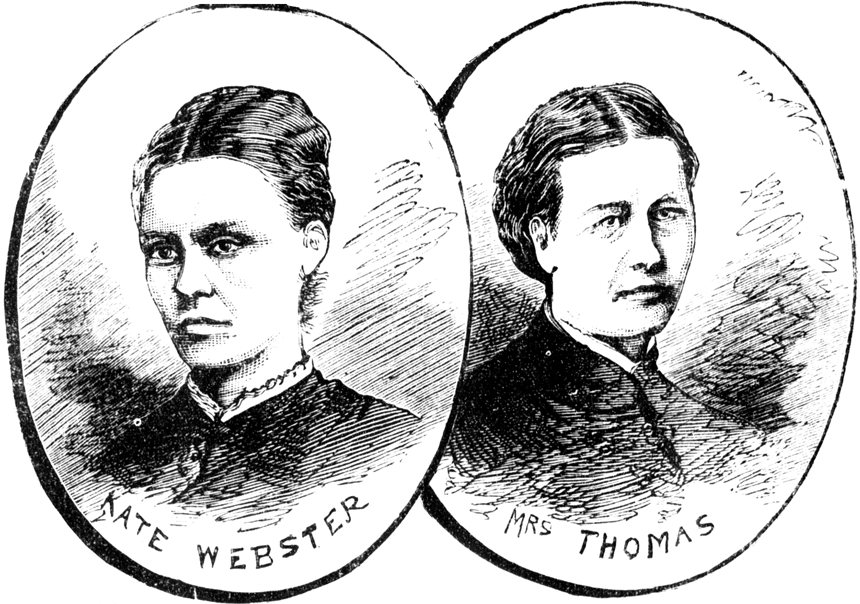
Kate Webster (left) and Julia Martha Thomas (right)

Julia Martha Thomas was a former schoolteacher who had been widowed twice. Since the death of her second husband in 1873, she had lived on her own at 2 Mayfield Cottages (also known as 2 Vine Cottages) in Park Road in Richmond, London. The house was a two-storey semi-detached villa built in grey stone with a garden at the front and back. The area was not heavily populated at the time, although her house was close to a public house called The Hole in the Wall.

Thomas was described by her doctor George Henry Rudd as "a small, well-dressed lady" who was about 54 years old. Elliot O'Donnell, summing up contemporary accounts in his introduction to a transcript of Webster's trial, said that Thomas had an "excitable temperament" and was regarded by her neighbours as eccentric. She frequently travelled, leaving her friends and relatives unaware of her whereabouts for weeks or months at a time. Thomas was a member of the lower middle class and as such was not wealthy, but she habitually dressed up and wore jewellery to give the impression of prosperity. Her desire to employ a live-in domestic servant probably had as much to do with status as with practicality. However, Thomas had a reputation for being a harsh employer and her irregular habits meant that she had difficulty finding and retaining servants. Before 1879, she had been able to keep only one maid for any length of time.

On 29 January 1879, Thomas took on Kate Webster as her servant. Webster had been born as Kate Lawler in Killanne, County Wexford, near Enniscorthy, in about 1849. She was later described by The Daily Telegraph as "a tall, strongly-made woman of about 5 feet 5 inches (165 cm) in height with sallow and much freckled complexion and large and prominent teeth".

The details of Webster's early life are unclear, as many of her later autobiographical statements proved unreliable, but she claimed to have been married to a sea captain called Webster with whom she had four children. According to Webster's account, all the children died, as did her husband, within a short time of each other. She was imprisoned for larceny in Wexford in December 1864, when she was only about 15 years old, and came to England in 1867. In February 1868, she was sentenced to four years of penal servitude for committing larceny in Liverpool. Webster was released from jail in January 1872 and, by 1873, she had moved to Rose Gardens in Hammersmith, West London, where she became friends with a neighbouring family named Porter. On 18 April 1874, she gave birth to a son whom she named John W. Webster in Kingston upon Thames. The identity of the father is unclear, as she named three different men at various times. One, a man named Strong, was her accomplice in further robberies and thefts. She later claimed to have been forced into crime, as she had been "forsaken by him, and committed crimes for the purpose of supporting myself and child".

Webster moved frequently around West London using various aliases, including Webb, Webster, Gibbs, Gibbons, and Lawler. While living in Teddington, she was arrested and convicted in May 1875 of 36 charges of larceny. She was sentenced to eighteen months in Wandsworth Prison. Not long after leaving prison, Webster was arrested again for larceny and was sentenced to another twelve months' imprisonment in February 1877. Her young son was cared for in her absence by Sarah Crease, a friend who worked as a charwoman for a Miss Loder in Richmond.

In January 1879, Crease fell ill and Webster stood in for her as a temporary replacement at Loder's house. Loder knew Thomas as a friend and was aware of her wish to find a domestic servant. She recommended Webster on the basis of the latter's temporary work for her. When Thomas met Webster, she engaged her on the spot, though she did not appear to have made any inquiries about Webster's character or past. After Webster was taken on by Thomas, the relationship between the two women appears to have deteriorated rapidly. Thomas disliked the quality of Webster's work and frequently criticised it. Webster later said:

At first I thought her a nice old lady ... but I found her very trying, and she used to do many things to annoy me during my work. When I had finished my work in my rooms, she used to go over it again after me, and point out places where she said I did not clean, showing evidence of a nasty spirit towards me.

Webster in turn became increasingly resentful of Thomas, to the point that Thomas attempted to persuade friends to stay with her as she did not like to be alone with Webster. It was arranged that Webster would leave Thomas's service on 28 February. Thomas recorded her decision in her last diary entry: "Gave Katherine warning to leave".

== Murder and the disposal of the body ==
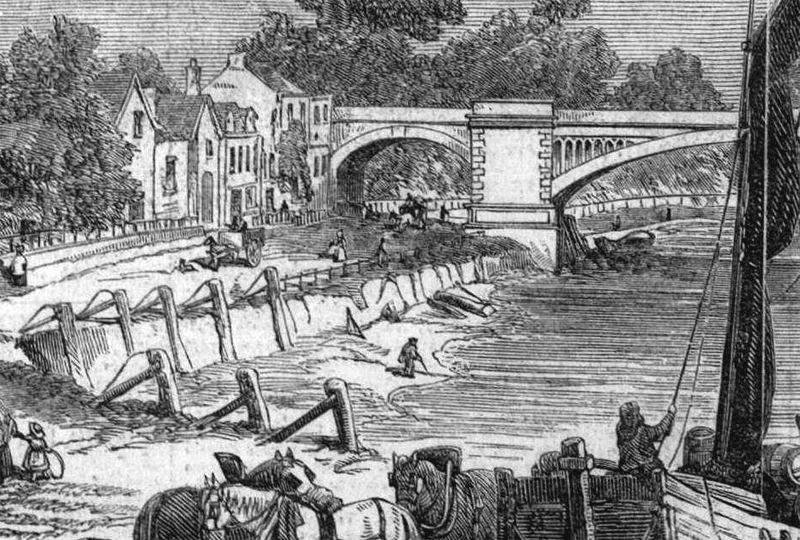
The Thames river bank below Barnes railway bridge, where a box containing Thomas's remains was found on 5 March 1879 after being thrown into the river the previous day by Webster

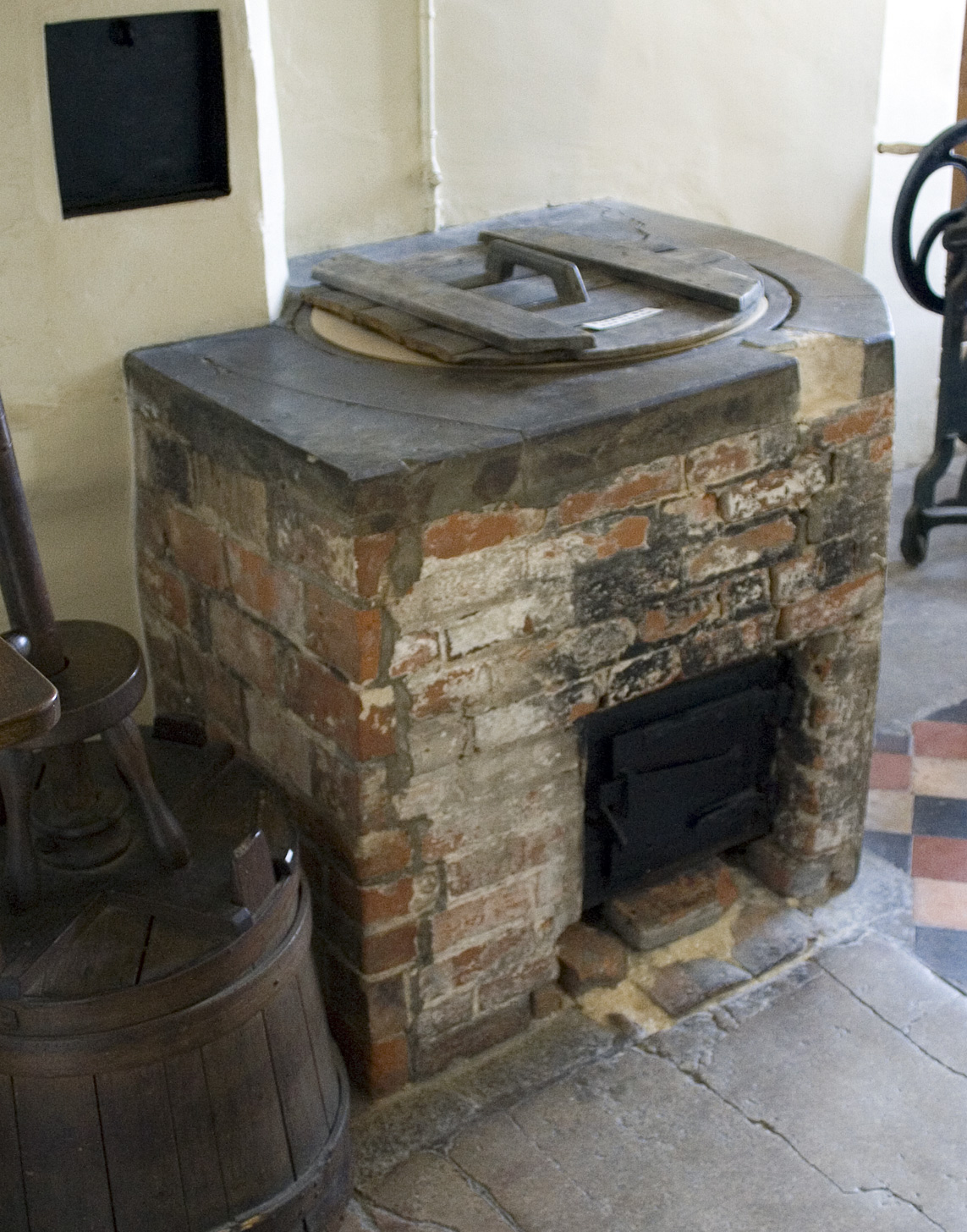
Webster boiled Thomas's dismembered body in a laundry copper such as this

Webster persuaded Thomas to keep her on for a further three days until Sunday 2 March. She had Sunday afternoons off as a half-day and was expected to return in time to help Thomas prepare for evening service at the local Presbyterian church. On this occasion, however, Webster visited the local alehouse and returned late, delaying Thomas's departure. The two women quarrelled and several members of the congregation later reported that Thomas had appeared "very agitated" on arriving at the church. She told a fellow congregant that she had been delayed by "the neglect of her servant to return home at the proper time", and said that Webster had "flown into a terrible passion" upon being rebuked. Thomas returned home from church early, about 9 pm, and confronted Webster. According to Webster's eventual confession:

Mrs. Thomas came in and went upstairs. I went up after her, and we had an argument, which ripened into a quarrel, and in the height of my anger and rage I threw her from the top of the stairs to the ground floor. She had a heavy fall, and I became agitated at what had occurred, lost all control of myself, and, to prevent her screaming and getting me into trouble, I caught her by the throat, and in the struggle she was choked, and I threw her on the floor.

The neighbours, a woman named Ives (Thomas's landlady) and her mother, heard a single thump like that of a chair falling over but paid no heed to it at the time. Next door, Webster began disposing of the body by dismembering it and boiling it in the laundry copper and burning the bones in the hearth. She later described her actions:

I determined to do away with the body as best I could. I chopped the head from the body with the assistance of a razor which I used to cut through the flesh afterwards. I also used the meat saw and the carving knife to cut the body up with. I prepared the copper with water to boil the body to prevent identity; and as soon as I had succeeded in cutting it up I placed it in the copper and boiled it. I opened the stomach with the carving knife, and burned up as much of the parts as I could.

The neighbours noticed an unusual, unpleasant smell. Webster spoke later of how she was "greatly overcome, both from the horrible sight before me and the smell". However, the activity at 2 Mayfield Cottages did not seem to be out of the ordinary, as it was customary in many households for the washing to begin early on Monday morning. Over the next couple of days, Webster continued cleaning the house and Thomas's clothes and to put on a show of normality for people who called for orders. Behind the scenes, she was packing the dismembered remains into a black Gladstone bag and a corded wooden bonnet-box. She was unable to fit the murdered woman's head and one of the feet into the containers and disposed of them separately, throwing the foot onto a rubbish heap in Twickenham. The head was buried under the Hole in the Wall's stables a short distance from Thomas's house, where it was found 131 years later.

On 4 March, Webster travelled to Hammersmith to see her old neighbours the Porters, whom she had not seen for six years, wearing Thomas's silk dress and carrying the Gladstone bag which she had filled with some of the remains. Webster introduced herself to the Porters as "Mrs. Thomas". She claimed that, since last meeting the Porters, she had married, had a child, been widowed, and had been left a house in Richmond by an aunt. She invited Porter and his son Robert to a pub, the Oxford and Cambridge Arms, in Barnes. Along the way, she disposed of the bag that she was carrying, probably by dropping it into the River Thames, while the Porters were inside the pub drinking. It was never recovered. Webster then asked young Robert Porter if he could help her carry a heavy box from 2 Mayfield Cottages to the station. As they crossed Richmond Bridge, Webster dropped the box into the Thames. She was able to explain it away and did not arouse Robert's suspicions.

The following day, however, the box was found washed up in shallow water next to the river bank about five miles downstream. It was spotted by Henry Wheatley, a coal porter who was driving his cart past Barnes Railway Bridge shortly before seven in the morning. He initially thought that the box might contain the proceeds of a burglary. He recovered the box and opened it, finding that it contained what looked like body parts wrapped in brown paper. The discovery was immediately reported to the police and the remains were examined by a doctor, who found that they consisted of the trunk (minus entrails) and legs (minus one foot) of a woman. The head was missing and was later assumed to have been thrown into the river separately by Webster.

Around the same time, a human foot and ankle were found in Twickenham. It was clear that all of the remains belonged to the same corpse, but there was nothing to connect them with Thomas and no means to identify the remains. The doctor who examined the body parts erroneously attributed them to "a young person with very dark hair". An inquest on 10–11 March resulted in an open verdict on the cause of death, and the unidentified remains were laid to rest in Barnes Cemetery on 19 March. The newspapers dubbed the unexplained murder the "Barnes Mystery", amid speculation that the body had been used for dissection and anatomical study.

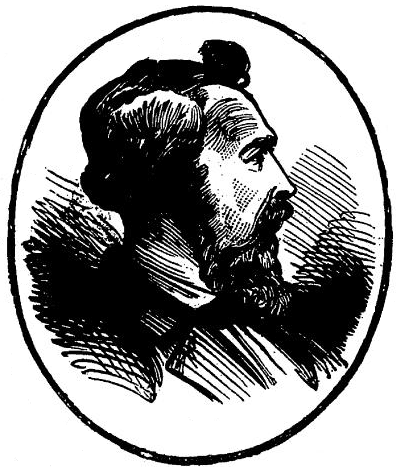
John Church, who bought Thomas's furniture from Webster and was falsely implicated by Webster for the murder

It was later alleged that Webster had offered two pots of lard to a neighbour, supposed to have been rendered from Thomas's boiled fat. However, no evidence about this was offered at the subsequent trial and it seems likely that the story is merely a legend, particularly as several versions of the story appear to exist. The proprietress of a nearby pub claimed that Webster had visited her establishment and tried to sell what she called "best dripping" there. Leonard Reginald Gribble, a writer on criminology, commented that "there is no acceptable evidence that such a repulsive sale was ever made, and it is more than possible that the episode belongs rightfully with the rest of the vast collection of apocryphal stories that has accumulated, not unnaturally, about the persons and deeds of famous criminals."

Webster continued to live at 2 Mayfield Cottages while posing as Thomas, wearing her late employer's clothes and dealing with tradesmen under her newly assumed identity. On 9 March, she reached an agreement with John Church, a victualler from Hammersmith, to sell Thomas's furniture and other goods to furnish his pub, the Rising Sun. He agreed to pay her £68 with an interim payment of £18 in advance.

By the time that the removal horse and cart arrived on 18 March, the neighbours were becoming increasingly suspicious, as they had not seen Thomas for nearly two weeks. Her next door neighbour and landlady Miss Ives asked the deliverymen who had ordered the goods removed. They replied "Mrs Thomas" and indicated Webster. Realising that she had been exposed, Webster fled immediately, catching a train to Liverpool and travelling from there to her family home at Enniscorthy.

Meanwhile, Church realised that he had been deceived. When he went through the clothes in the delivery van, he found a letter addressed to the real Thomas. The police were called in and searched 2 Mayfield Cottages. There they discovered blood stains, burned finger-bones in the hearth and fatty deposits behind the copper, as well as a letter left by Webster giving her home address in Ireland. They immediately put out a "wanted" notice giving a description of Webster and her son. Detectives from Scotland Yard soon discovered that Webster and her son had fled back to Ireland aboard a coal steamer.

The head constable of the Royal Irish Constabulary (RIC) in Wexford realised that the woman being sought by Scotland Yard was the same person whom his force had arrested fourteen years previously for larceny. The RIC were able to trace Webster to her uncle's farm at Killanne near Enniscorthy and arrested her there on 29 March. She was taken to Kingstown (modern Dún Laoghaire) and from there back to Richmond via Holyhead, in the custody of the Scotland Yard policemen.

On hearing of the crime with which she was charged, Webster's uncle refused to give shelter to her son, and the authorities sent the boy to the local workhouse until such time as a place could be found for him in an industrial school.

== Webster's trial and execution ==
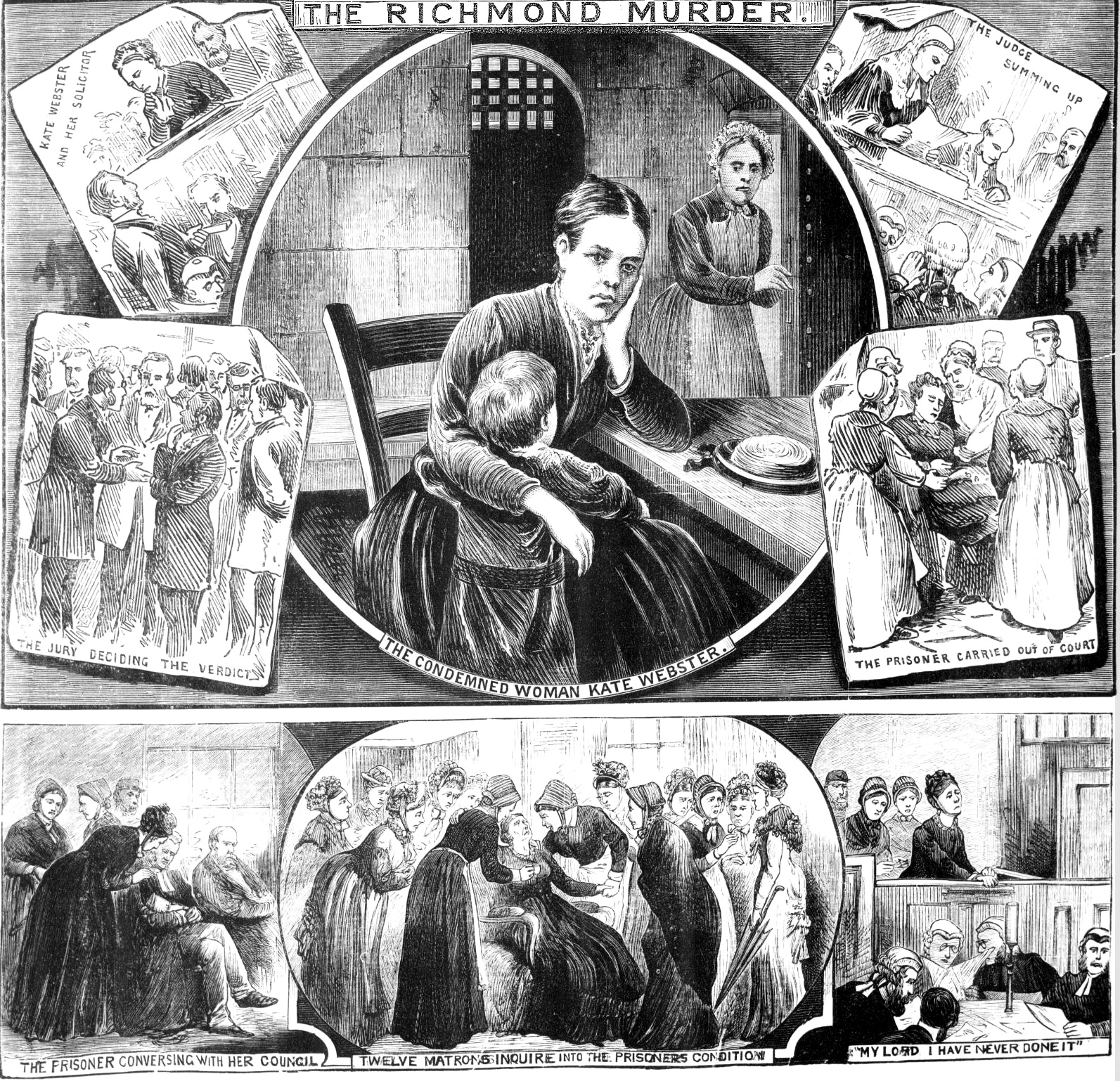
A depiction by The Illustrated Police News of the trial and conviction of Kate Webster

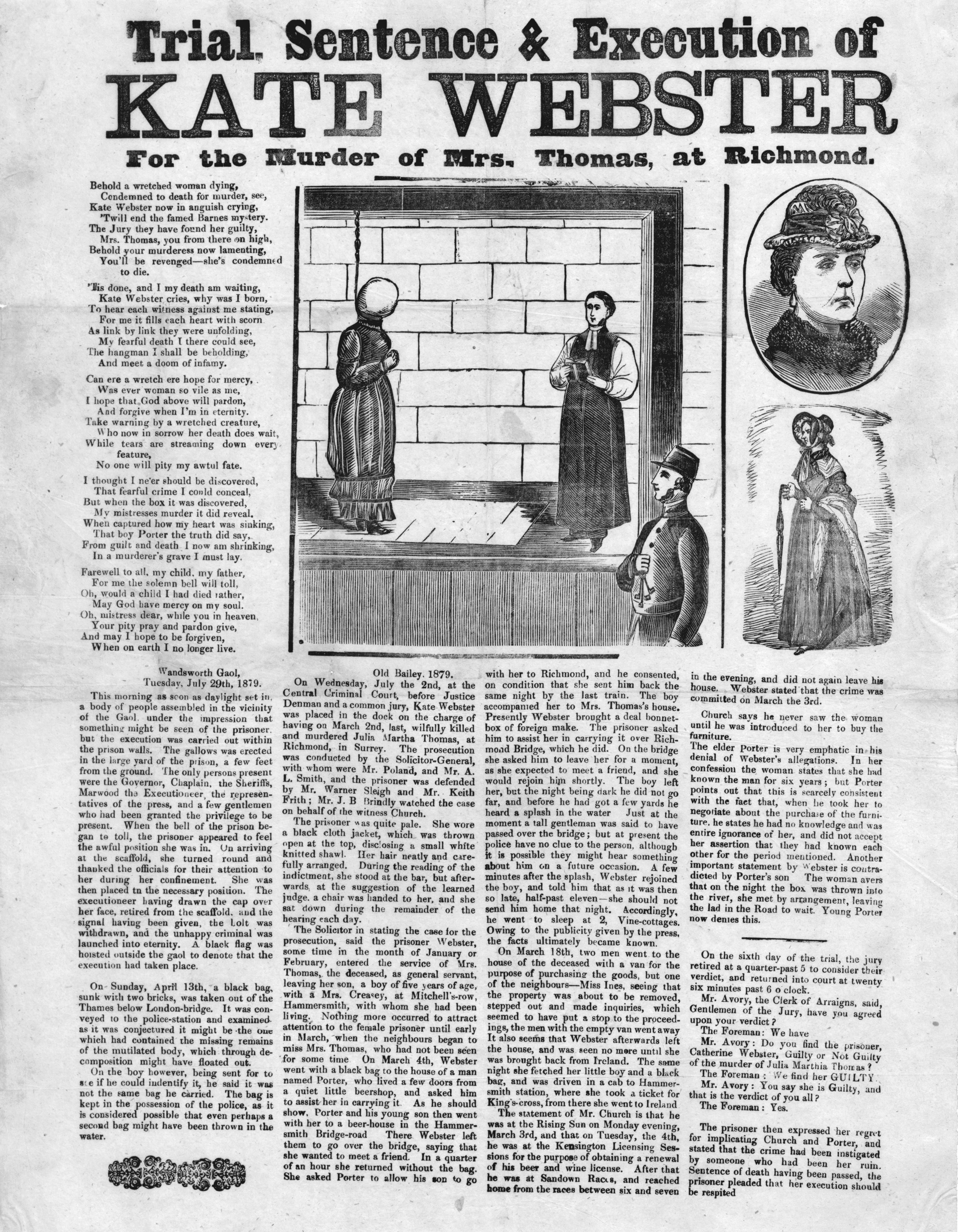
An anonymous broadside published c. July 1879 commemorating the trial, sentence and execution of Webster

Thomas's murder caused a sensation on both sides of the Irish Sea. When the news broke, many people travelled to Richmond to look at Mayfield Cottages. The crime was just as notorious in Ireland; as Webster travelled under arrest from Enniscorthy to Dublin, crowds gathered to gawk and jeer at her at nearly every station between the two locations. The pre-trial magistrates' hearings were attended by "many privileged and curious persons ... including not a few ladies", according to the Manchester Guardian. The Times reported that Webster's first appearance at Richmond Magistrates' Court was greeted by "an immense crowd yesterday around the building ... and very great excitement prevailed."

Webster went on trial at the Central Criminal Court – the Old Bailey – on 2 July 1879. In a sign of the great public interest aroused by the case, the prosecution was led by the Solicitor General, Sir Hardinge Giffard. Webster was defended by a prominent London barrister, Warner Sleigh, and the case was presided over by Mr. Justice Denman. The trial was just as well-attended as the earlier hearings in Richmond and attracted intense interest from all levels of society; on the fourth day of the trial, the Crown Prince of Sweden – the future King Gustaf V – turned up to watch the proceedings.

Over the course of six days, the court heard a succession of witnesses piecing together the complicated story of how Thomas had met her death. Webster had attempted before the trial to implicate the publican John Church and her former neighbour Porter, but both men had solid alibis and were cleared of any involvement in the murder. She pleaded not guilty and her defence sought to emphasise the circumstantial nature of the evidence, highlighting her devotion to her son as a reason why she could not have been capable of the murder. However, Webster's public unpopularity, impassive demeanour and scanty defence counted strongly against her.

A particularly damning piece of evidence came from a bonnetmaker named Maria Durden who told the court that Webster had visited her a week before the murder and had said that she was going to Birmingham to sell some property, jewellery and a house that her aunt had left her. The jury interpreted this as a sign that Webster had premeditated the murder and convicted her after deliberating for about an hour and a quarter.

Shortly after the jury returned its verdict and just before the judge was about to pass sentence, Webster was asked if there was any reason why sentence of death should not be passed upon her. She pleaded that she was pregnant in an apparent bid to avoid the death penalty. The Law Times reported that "[u]pon this a scene of uncertainty, if not of confusion, ensued, certainly not altogether in harmony with the solemnity of the occasion." The judge commented that "after thirty-two years in the profession, he was never at an inquiry of this sort."

Eventually the Clerk of Assize suggested using the archaic mechanism of a jury of matrons, constituted from a selection of the women attending the court, to rule upon the question of whether Webster was "with quick child". Twelve women were sworn in along with a surgeon named Bond, and they accompanied Webster to a private room for an examination that only took a couple of minutes. They returned a verdict that Webster was not "quick with child", though this did not necessarily mean that she was not pregnant – a distinction that led the president of the Obstetrical Society of London to protest at the use of "the obsolete medical assumption that the unborn child is not alive until the so-called 'quickening'".

A few days before Webster was due to be executed an appeal was submitted on her behalf to the Home Secretary, R. A. Cross. It was turned down with an official statement that after considering the arguments put forward, the Home Secretary had "failed to discover any sufficient ground to justify him in advising Her Majesty to interfere with the due course of the law".

Before she was executed, Webster made two statements confessing to the crime. In her first, she implicated Strong, the purported father of her child, who she said had participated in the murder and was responsible for leading her into a life of crime. She recanted on 28 July, the night before she was due to be executed, making a further statement in which she took sole responsibility and exonerated Church, Porter and Strong of any involvement. She was hanged the following day at Wandsworth Prison at 9 am, where the hangman, William Marwood, used his newly developed long drop technique to cause instantaneous death. After her death was certified, she was buried in an unmarked grave in one of the prison's exercise yards. The crowd waiting outside cheered as a black flag was raised over the prison walls, signifying that the death sentence had been carried out.

An auction of Thomas's property was held at 2 Mayfield Cottages on the day after Webster's execution. Church managed to obtain Thomas's furniture after all, along with numerous other personal effects including her pocket-watch and the knife with which she had been dismembered. The copper in which the body had been boiled was sold for five shillings. Other visitors contented themselves with taking small pebbles and twigs from the garden as souvenirs. The house itself remained unoccupied until 1897, as nobody would live there after the murder. Even then, according to the occupant, servants were reluctant to work at such a notorious place.

It was later rumoured that a "ghostly nun" could be seen hovering over the place where Thomas had been buried. To the surprise and disappointment of Elliott O'Donnell, there was no sign that her house was haunted, and Guy Logan noted that the "neat and pretty" appearance of the property gave no hint of the crime that had been committed within: "anything less like the popular conception of a 'murder house' it would be hard to imagine."

== Social impact of the murder ==
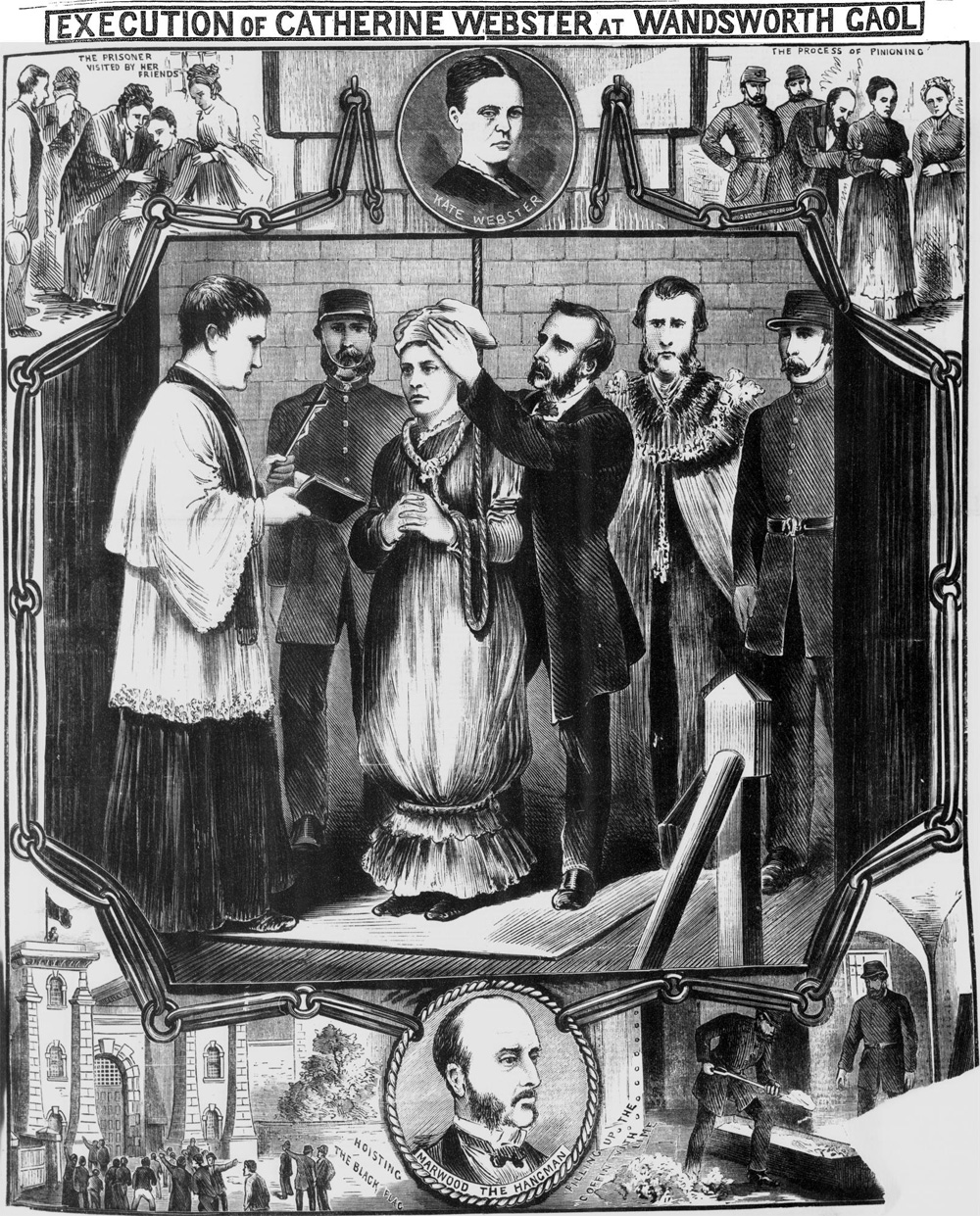
Webster's execution, as depicted by a souvenir illustration in the Illustrated Police News

The murder had a considerable social impact on Victorian Britain and Ireland. It caused an immediate sensation and was widely reported in the press. Freeman's Journal and Daily Commercial Advertiser of Dublin noted that what it called "one of the most sensational and awful chapters in the annals of human wickedness" had resulted in the press "teem[ing] with descriptions and details of the ghastly horrors of that crime".

Such was Webster's notoriety that within only a few weeks of her arrest, and well before she had gone to trial, Madame Tussaud's created a wax effigy of her and put it on display for those who wished to see the "Richmond Murderess". It remained on display well into the twentieth century alongside other notorious killers such as Burke and Hare and Hawley Harvey Crippen.

Within days of Webster's execution an enterprising publisher on the Strand rushed into print a souvenir booklet for the price of a penny, "The Life, Trial and Execution of Kate Webster", which was advertised as "compris[ing] Twenty Handsome Pages, containing her entire History, with Summing-up, Verdict, and interesting particulars, together with her last words, and a FULL-PAGE ENGRAVING of the EXECUTION – Portraits, Illustrations &c." The Illustrated Police News published a souvenir cover depicting an artist's impression of the day of the execution. It depicted "the prisoner visited by her friends", "the process of pinioning", the final rites being said, "hoisting the black flag", and finally "filling up the coffin with lime".

The case was also commemorated, while it was still ongoing, by street ballads – musical narratives set to the tune of popular songs. H. Such, a printer and publisher in Southwark, issued a ballad entitled "Murder and Mutilation of an Old Lady near Barnes" shortly after Webster had been arrested, set to the tune of "Just Before the Battle, Mother", a popular song of the American Civil War. At the end of the trial Such issued another ballad, set to the tune of "Driven from Home", announcing:

The terrible crime at Richmond at last,
On Catherine Webster now has been cast,
Tried and found guilty she is sentenced to die.
From the strong hand of justice she cannot fly.
She has tried all excuses but of no avail,
About this and murder she's told many tales,
She has tried to throw blame on others as well,
But with all her cunning at last she has fell.

Webster herself was characterised as malicious, reckless and wilfully evil. Commentators saw her crime as both gruesome and scandalous. Servants were expected to be deferential; her act of extreme violence towards her employer was deeply disquieting. At the time, about 40% of the female labour force was employed as domestic servants for a very wide range of society, from the wealthiest to respectable working-class families. Servants and employers lived and worked in close proximity, and the honesty and orderliness of servants was a constant cause of concern. Servants were very poorly paid and larceny was an ever-present temptation. Had Webster succeeded in completing the deal with Church to sell Thomas's furniture, she stood to gain the equivalent of two to three years' worth of wages.

Another cause of revulsion against Webster was her attempt to impersonate Thomas. She had managed to perpetrate the impersonation for two weeks, implying that middle-class identity amounted to little more than cultivating the right demeanour and having the appropriate clothes and possessions, whether or not they had been earned. Church, whom Webster had attempted to implicate, was himself a former servant who had risen to lower middle-class status and earned a measure of prosperity and effective management of his pub. His commitment to bettering himself through hard work was in keeping with the ethic of the time. Webster, in contrast, had simply stolen her briefly-held middle-class identity.

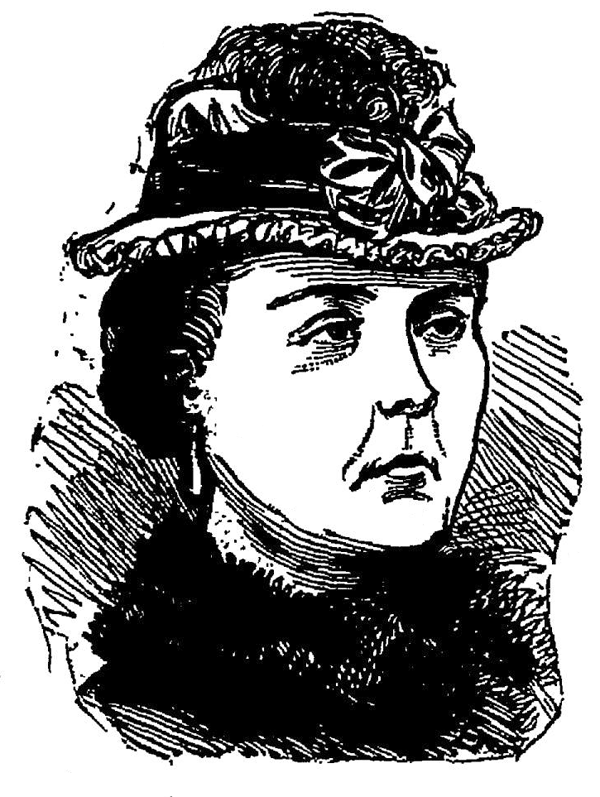
Webster's appearance (depicted here by The Penny Illustrated Paper and Illustrated Times) was a topic of comment in the press

Exacerbating the crime in the minds of many Victorians was how Webster violated the expected norms of femininity by the standards of the Victorian era. Victorian ideals saw women as moral, passive and physically weak or restrained. Webster was seen as quite the opposite and was described in lurid ways that emphasised her lack of femininity. Elliott O'Donnell, writing in his introduction to the trial transcript, described Webster as "not merely savage, savage and shocking ... but the grimmest of grim personalities, a character so uniquely sinister and barbaric as to be hardly human." The newspapers described her as "gaunt, repellent, and trampish-looking", though the reporter for The Penny Illustrated Paper and Illustrated Times commented that she was "not so ill-favoured as she has been described".

Webster's appearance and behaviour were seen as key signs of her inherently criminal nature. Crimes were thought to be committed by a social "residuum" at the bottom of society who occupied themselves as "habitual criminals", choosing to live a life of drink and theft rather than improving themselves through thrift and hard work. Her strong build, partly a result of the hard physical labour that was her livelihood, ran counter to the largely middle-class notion that women were meant to be physically frail. Some commentators saw her facial features as indicative of criminality; O'Donnell commented upon her "obliquely set eyes", which he declared "are not infrequently found in homicides ... this peculiarity, which I consider was sufficient in itself, as one of nature's danger signals, to have warned people to steer clear of her."

Webster's behaviour in court and her sexual history also counted against her. She was widely described by reporters as "calm" and "stolid" in facing the court and cried only once during the trial, when her son was mentioned. This contradicted the expectation that "properly feminine" women should be penitent and emotional in such a situation. Her succession of male friends, one of whom had fathered her child outside wedlock, suggested promiscuous female sexuality – again, strongly counter to expected norms of behaviour. During her trial Webster attempted unsuccessfully to evoke sympathy by blaming Strong, the possible father of her child, for leading her astray: "I formed an intimate acquaintance with one who should have protected me and was led away by evil associates and bad companions." This claim played on social expectations that women's moral sense was inextricably linked with chastity – "falling" sexually would lead to other forms of "ruin" – and that men who had sexual relations with women acquired social obligations that they were expected to fulfil. Webster's attempt to implicate three innocent men also caused outrage; O'Donnell commented that "public opinion, as a whole, undoubtedly condemned Kate Webster, as much, perhaps, for her attempts to bring three innocent men to the scaffold as for the actual murder itself."

According to Shani D'Cruze of the Feminist Crime Research Network, the fact that Webster was Irish was a significant factor in the widespread revulsion felt towards her in Britain. Many Irish people had emigrated to England since the Great Famine of 1849, but met widespread prejudice and persistent associations with criminality and drunkenness. The Irish were at worst depicted as bestial and subhuman, and there were repeated episodes of violence between Irish and English workers as well as attacks by Fenians (Irish nationalists) in England. The demonisation of Webster as "hardly human", as O'Donnell put it, was of a piece with the public and judicial perceptions of the Irish as innately criminal.

== Discovery of Thomas's skull ==
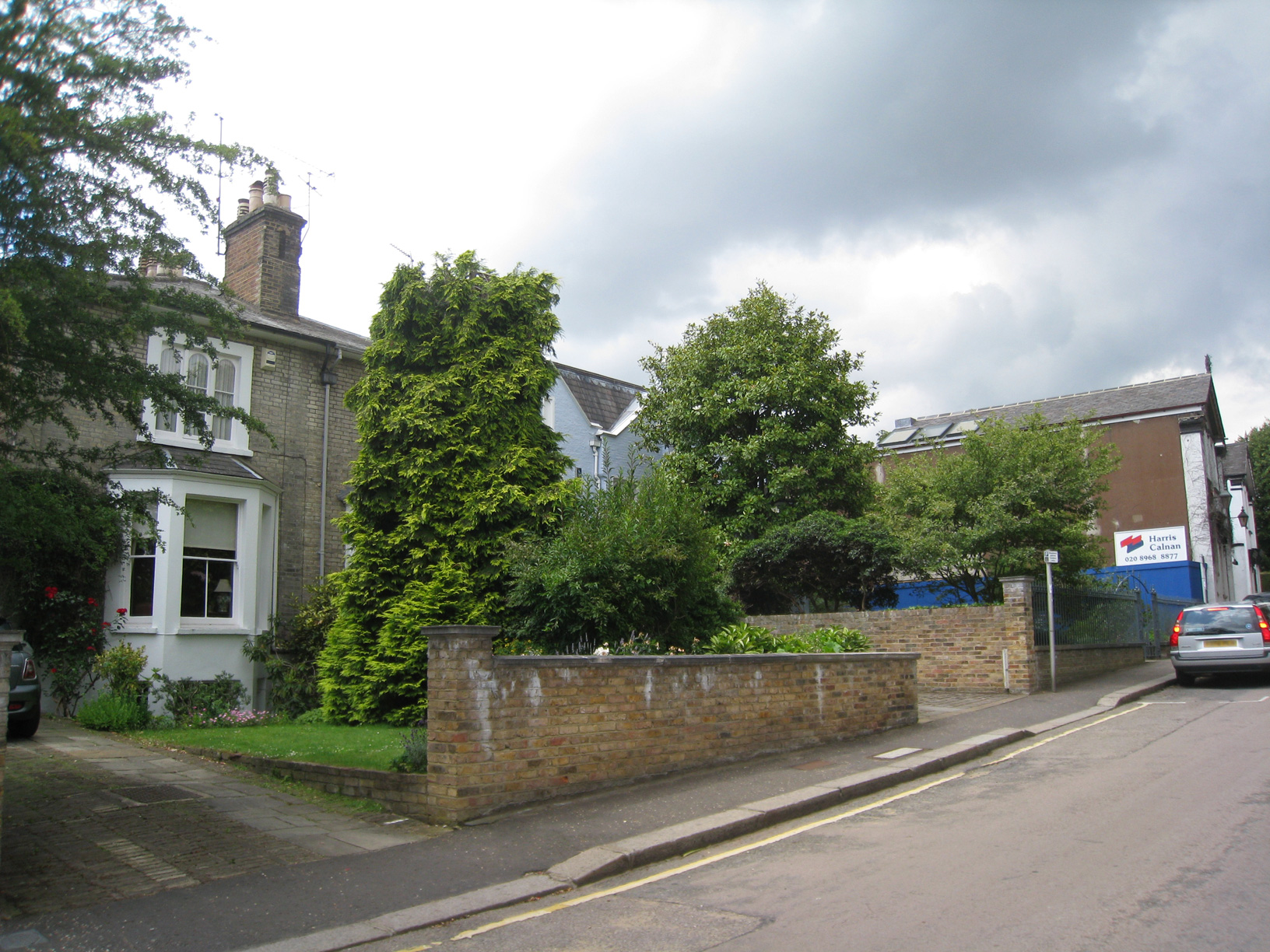
View of buildings in Park Road, Richmond, associated with the murder of Julia Martha Thomas. (Left: the former Mayfield Cottages, where the murder took place; centre behind trees, the house of the naturalist Sir David Attenborough; right, the former Hole in the Wall pub, where Thomas's skull was discovered on 22 October 2010)

In 1952, the naturalist Sir David Attenborough and his wife Jane bought a house situated between the former Mayfield Cottages (which still stand today) and the Hole in the Wall pub. The pub closed in 2007 and fell into dereliction but was bought by Attenborough in 2009 to be redeveloped.

On 22 October 2010, workmen carrying out excavation work at the rear of the old pub uncovered a "dark circular object", which turned out to be a woman's skull. It had been buried underneath foundations that had been in place for at least forty years, on the site of the pub's stables. It was immediately speculated that the skull was Thomas's, and the coroner asked Richmond police to carry out an investigation into the identity and circumstances of death of the skull's owner.

Carbon dating carried out at the University of Edinburgh dated the skull to between 1650 and 1880, while the fact that it had been deposited on top of a layer of Victorian tiles suggested that it belonged to the end of this era. The skull had fracture marks consistent with Webster's account of throwing Thomas down the stairs, and it was found to have low collagen levels, consistent with it being boiled. In July 2011, the coroner concluded that the skull was indeed that of Thomas. DNA testing was not possible as she had died childless and no relatives could be traced; in addition, there was no record of where exactly in Barnes Cemetery the rest of her body had been buried.

The coroner recorded a verdict of unlawful killing, superseding the open verdict recorded in 1879. The cause of Thomas's death was given as asphyxiation and a head injury. The police called the outcome "a good example of how good old-fashioned detective work, historical records and technological advances came together to solve the 'Barnes Mystery'".

== In popular culture ==
The case has been covered in television dramatizations including Lady Killers (1980), where Kate Webster was portrayed by Elaine Paige, and Deadly Women (2011).

== Bibliography ==
- Bailey, Brian J. (1993). Hangman: from Ketch to Pierrepoint, 300 years of execution. London: True Crime. ISBN 978-0-86369-623-7.
- Carver, Stephen James (2003). The life and works of the Lancashire novelist William Harrison Ainsworth, 1850–1882. Lewiston, NY: Edwin Mellen Press. ISBN 978-0-7734-6633-3.
- Castleden, Rodney (2005). Serial Killers: They Live to Kill. London: Time Warner. ISBN 978-0-316-73252-9.
- Conley, Carolyn (2006). Certain other countries: homicide, gender, and national identity in late nineteenth-century England, Ireland, Scotland, and Wales. Columbus, OH: Ohio State University Press. ISBN 978-0-8142-1051-2.
- D'Cruze, Shani; Walklate, Sandra; Pegg, Samantha (2006). Murder: Social and historical approaches to understanding murder and murderers. Cullompton, Devon: Willan Publishing. ISBN 978-1-84392-169-1.
- Gaute, J.H.H.; Odell, Robin (1983). Lady Killers. Bath, England: Chivers Press. p. 83. ISBN 978-0-85119-885-9.
- Gribble, Leonard Reginald (1957). Famous judges and their trials: a century of justice. London: J. Long.
- O'Donnell, Elliot (1925). The Trial of Kate Webster. Edinburgh: William Hodge & Company.
- Oldman, James (2006). Trial by jury: the Seventh Amendment and Anglo-American special juries. New York: NYU Press. ISBN 978-0-8147-6204-2.
- Rudd, George Henry (1916). "Kate Webster's Revenge". In Wood, Walter (ed.). Survivors' Tales of Famous Crimes. London: Cassell & Company.
- Wilson, Patrick (1971). Murderess: A study of the women executed in Britain since 1843. London: Michael Joseph. ISBN 978-0-7181-0859-5.
