= J. D. Casswell =

English barrister

- Born: 1886
- Died: 15 December 1963 (aged 76–77)
- Education: King's College School; Pembroke College, Oxford
- Occupation: barrister

Joshua David Casswell, QC (1886 – 15 December 1963) was an English barrister, noted for a case involving the Titanic, and for several infamous murder cases. He was famous for being charming and unruffled. He was relentless in his pursuit of a case, with a great knowledge of the law, and something of a gift for rhetoric.

== Biography ==
Casswell was born in Wimbledon, the son of Joshua Joyce Casswell and Sarah Tate. He was educated at King's College School, Wimbledon, and then Pembroke College, Oxford University, gaining an honours degree in Jurisprudence in 1909. He was called to the bar in 1910.

Casswell served in World War I as a major, and was mentioned in dispatches in 1916, before being invalided home in 1917. He married Irene Fitzroy Hutton in 1919 and had three sons and one daughter.

== The Titanic case ==
In 1913, Casswell acted in a case against the Oceanic Steam Navigation Company, which owned the White Star Line, in relation to the sinking of the Titanic. The outcome was that several relatives of passengers who had drowned were awarded £100 each in compensation, when the jury found that the captain had been negligent.

== Rattenbury ==
In 1935, Casswell acted for George Percy Stoner, a Bournemouth chauffeur, who was accused of murdering his employer, the architect Francis Rattenbury. The case gathered public attention because the other suspect, Rattenbury's pretty young wife Alma, committed suicide shortly after the murder, leading to a suspicion that Stoner had taken the blame for her. He was, in the end reprieved from a death sentence.

== The Cleft chin murder ==
Casswell acted for Elizabeth Marina Jones, in 1944, in possibly his most well-known case, called the Cleft chin murder. Jones and her boyfriend, Karl Hulten, who had deserted from the US Army, indulged in a campaign of violence ending in the death of a taxi driver. Hulten was executed, but Casswell secured Jones’ life and she was released in 1954. The case prompted George Orwell to write an essay ‘Decline of the English Murder’.

== Neville Heath ==
In 1946, Casswell's attentions returned to Bournemouth, which had been the scene of the gruesome murder of Doreen Marshall by Neville Heath. Heath had also killed Margery Gardener, and there was discussion as to which murder should be the basis of his trial. Doreen Marshall's murder had been so brutal that the prosecution felt it opened the door to a defence plea of insanity, so he was tried for Margery Gardner's killing. In court the debate focussed on the question of whether or not Heath was in his right mind.

By the end of his career, Casswell had defended 40 people accused of murder, and had saved all but five of them from execution.

== In popular culture ==
Casswell was portrayed by Paul Arlington in the Granada Television series Lady Killers, in an episode depicting the trial of Charlotte Bryant and one depicting the trial of Neville Heath.
