= Lady Killers (TV series) =

1980 British TV crime series

- Also known as: Ladykillers
- Genre: Historical drama Crime drama
- Created by: Pieter Rogers
- Written by: Various
- Screenplay by: Various
- Directed by: Various
- Presented by: Robert Morley
- Country of origin: United Kingdom
- Original language: English
- No. of series: 2
- No. of episodes: 14

Production
- Production location: United Kingdom
- Camera setup: Multi-camera
- Running time: 60 minutes
- Production company: Granada Television

Original release
- Network: ITV
- Release: 20 July 1980 – 21 August 1981

Lady Killers or Ladykillers is a historical television play series broadcast on ITV from 1980 to 1981. The programme ran for two series and was presented by the actor Robert Morley.

== Synopsis ==
Ladykillers is a series of hour-long plays based on real-life murder trials. The episodes are reconstructions of the criminal trials. The first series focuses on female defendants and the second series focuses on male defendants.

== Development ==
Lady Killers was created by Pieter Rogers and produced by Granada Television. The plays involved defendants, witnesses, judges and lawyers in dramatizations of high profile murder trials of the 19th century and 20th century. Series 2, Episode 7 was a remake of a TV play made in 1976 as part of the "Killers" television series titled "Murder at The Metropole".

== Episodes ==
=== Series 1 ===
No. overall	No. in series	Title	Directed by	Written by	Original release date
1	1	"Murder at the Savoy Hotel"	Philip Draycott	Helena Osborne	20 July 1980
In 1923, Marie Marguerite Fahmy (Barbara Kellerman) shot dead her Egyptian husband at the Savoy Hotel in London. Cast : Barbara Kellerman as Marie Marguerite Fahmy; Robert Stephens as Edward Marshall Hall; Charles Kay as Henry Curtis-Bennett; Edward Hammond as Roland Oliver; John Horsley as Rigby Swift; George Parsons as Freke Palmer; Brian Miller as Bowker; David Buck as Percival Clarke; Joseph Brady as Mr. Beattie; Carlos Douglas as Mariani; Lewis Fiander as Said Enani; Susan Wooldridge as Janet Cole; Richard Kay as Robert Churchill; Barry McGinn as Dr. Ernest Henry Gordon; Angus MacKay as Dr. James Henry Morton; Peter Newton as Clerk of Court; Wilf Durham as Jury Foreman
2	2	"Not for the Nervous"	Valerie Hanson	Arden Winch	27 July 1980
In 1879, Irish maid Kate Webster (Elaine Paige) killed her employer Julia Thomas in Richmond. Cast : Elaine Paige as Kate Webster; John Fraser as John Church; Leslie French as Justice Denman; Michael Kitchen as Reverend Father M'Enery; T.P. McKenna as Sir Hardinge Giffard; Peter Sallis as O'Brien; Riffi Lewis as Robert Porter; William Wilde as Warner Sleigh; Harry Littlewood as Henry Porter; Molly Veness as Mrs. Jane Ives; Margaret Lang as Mrs. Bates; Jenny Howe as Miss Thomas; Richard Colson as Clerk of the Court; John Trent as Foreman of the Jury; Tom Harrison as Usher
3	3	"Lucky, Lucky Thirteen!"	Nicholas Ferguson	Frances Galleymore	3 August 1980
In 1955, Ruth Ellis (Georgina Hale) shot dead her abusive lover and became the last woman to be executed in the United Kingdom. Cast : Georgina Hale as Ruth Ellis; Jane Lowe as Edna Baker; Andrew Johns as John Bickford; Jean Rimmer as Dr. Charity Taylor; Michael Johnson as Desmond Cussen; Edward Hardwicke as Christmas Humphreys; Robert Flemyng as Cecil Havers; Bernard Horsfall as Melford Stevenson; Eamon Boland as Anthony Findlater; Irene Sutcliffe as Gladys Yule; Susan Derrick as Miss Holbrook; Anthony Benson as Clerk of Court; Dorothy Townson as Woman in the Public Gallery; Roberta Taylor as Roberta Martin; Igor Gridneff as Jury Foreman; Isabel Metliss as Miss Timpson; Laurence Payne as Victor Mishcon
4	4	"Killing Mice"	Nicholas Ferguson	Edwin Pearce	10 August 1980
In 1890, Mary Pearcey (Joanna David) was convicted of murdering her lover's wife and baby in Hampstead. Cast : Joanna David as Mary Pearcey; Geoffrey Keen as Mr. Fulton; Ronald Lacey as Inspector Bannister; Paul Nicholas as Frank Hogg; Doreen Mantle as Mrs. Wheeler; Elizabeth Bennett as Mrs. Clay; Deborah Norton as Clara Hogg; Jonathan Elsom as Mr. Hutton; Jo Warne as Martha Styles; Donald Eccles as Judge; Geoffrey Leesley as John Charles Pearcey; Zuleika Robson as Sarah; Paul Croucher as Billy Holmes; Bernard Brown as Mr. Grain; George Parsons as Freke Palmer
5	5	"Don't Let Them Kill Me on Wednesday"	Valerie Hanson	Jeremy Sandford	17 August 1980
In 1936, Charlotte Bryant (Rita Tushingham) was convicted for the arsenic poisoning murder of her husband Frederick, and became last woman convicted of murder in Dorset to be hanged. Cast : Rita Tushingham as Charlotte Bryant; George Baker as Terence O'Connor; John Woodnutt as Stuart McKinnon; Paul Arlington as J. D. Casswell; Colin George as Christopher George Arrow; Patricia Heneghan as Ethel Staunton; Gilbert Wynne as Dr. Thomas MacCarthy; Veronica Doran as Lucy Ostler; Peter Kelly as Leonard Parsons; Joan Heath as Mrs. Penfold; Linda Polan as Priscilla Loveridge; Stephen Hancock as Dr. Roche Lynch; Karen Cuff as Lily Bryant; Stephen Cuff as Ernest Bryant; Kay Gallie as Miss Biffin; Maggie Riley as Mrs. Eaves; Frances Bennett as Violet Van der Elst
6	6	"Miss Madeleine Smith"	Joan Kemp-Welch	Susan Pleat	24 August 1980
In 1857, Scottish socialite Madeleine Smith (Elizabeth Richardson) was accused of murdering her lover with arsenic. Cast : Elizabeth Richardson as Madeleine Smith; Ian McCulloch as John Inglis; Walter Carr as James Moncreiff; David McKail as John Hope; Joan Scott as Miss Aitken; Eleanor McCready as Mrs. Jenkins; Elaine Wells as Miss Mary Arthur Perry; Philip Voss as Auguste de Mean; Juliet Cadzow as Christina Haggart Mackenzie; Gordon Reid as William Harper Minnoch; Andrew McCulloch as Mr Ogilvie; John Dunbar as Clerk of Court; Geoff Tomlinson as Jury Chancellor
7	7	"Suffer Little Children"	Nicholas Ferguson	Nemone Lethbridge	31 August 1980
In 1896, Amelia Dyer (Joan Sims) was convicted of murdering infants in her care Cast : Joan Sims as Amelia Dyer; Margaret Lang as Mrs. Bates; Zuleika Robson as Sarah; Leslie French as Judge; Jeremy Clyde as Mr. Kapadia; Colin Jeavons as Mr. A.T. Lawrence; Belinda Sinclair as Miss Evelina Edith Marmon; Andrew Johns as Mr. Hendry; Clare Kelly as Mrs. Sergeant; June Barry as Mary Ann Palmer; Terence Budd as Arthur Ernest Palmer; David Ryder-Futcher as William Dyer; Tim Seely as L. Forbes Winslow; Colin Edwynn as Dr. James Scott; Marina McConnell as Little Woman; Gordon Fleming as Mr. Horace Avory; Bill Croasdale as Court Usher

=== Series 2 ===
No. overall	No. in series	Title	Directed by	Written by	Original release date
8	1	"Miss Elmore"	Nicholas Ferguson	Edwin Pearce	10 July 1981
In 1910, American homeopath Hawley Harvey Crippen was hanged at Pentonville Prison, for the murder of his second wife for the love of his mistress Ethel Le Neve. Cast : John Fraser as Dr. Crippen; Hannah Gordon as Ethel Le Neve; Joan Sims as Belle Elmore (voice); Heather Chasen as Mrs. Martinetti; Lewis Fiander as Sir Richard Muir; Lewis Shaw as Lord Alverstone; Alex Johnston as Mr. A.A. Tobin; Alan Downer as Chief Inspector Dew; Donald Eccles Dr. A.J. Pepper; Andrew Johns as Dr. Bernard Spilsbury; Elizabeth Burger as Mrs Thomas; Bill Croasdale as Clerk of Court; Al Gillyon as Jury Foreman; Duncan McNaughton as Court Usher; Gilbert Wynne as Mr Blundell; Mark Wingett as Alfred; Stuart Latham as Prison Governor
9	2	"The Root of All Evil"	Unknown	Sue Lake	17 July 1981
In 1912, Frederick Seddon (Michael Jayston) was hanged for the murder of his lodger Eliza Barrow. Cast : Michael Jayston as Frederick Seddon; Carol Drinkwater as Margaret Seddon; Lewis Fiander as Richard Muir; Michael Byrne as Edward Marshall-Hall; Sarah Berger as Maggie Seddon; Christopher Banks as Thomas Bucknill; Robin Sachs as Gervais Rentoul; Hilda Kriseman as Amelia Vonderahe; Margaret Lang as Mrs. Bates; Sandy Walsh as Lily; Trevor Cooper as Oliver; Eric Dodson as Dr. Henry Sworn; Kevin Woodrow as Ernest Grant; Andrew Johns as Dr. Bernard Spilsbury; Pam St. Clement as Mary Chater; Ellis Jones as Harry Taylor; Michael Ripper as William Seddon
10	3	"My Perfect Husband"	Kenny McBain	Nemone Lethbridge	24 July 1981
In 1915, George Joseph Smith was convicted and subsequently hanged for the murders of three women. Cast : Kenneth Haigh as George Joseph Smith; Jill Dixon as Edith Mabel Pegler; Michael Byrne as Edward Marshall-Hall; John Justin as Thomas Edward Scrutton; Stephen Murray as Archibald Bodkin; Edmund Kente as Philip de Vere Annesley; Matyelok Gibbs as Dolly Hill; Geoffrey Bayldon as Dr. Alfred Austin French; Joan Hickson as Carrie Esther Rapley; Edwin Finn as Alfred Apps Hogbin; Gordon Gostelow as Charles Burnham; Betty Alberge as Margaret Crossley; Lloyd Lamble as Dr. George Billing; Irene Prador as Louisa Blatch; Andrew Johns as Bernard Spilsbury; Alfie Curtis as Mr. Waters; George Hagan as Clerk of Court
11	4	"A Smile Is Sometimes Worth a Million Dollars"	Joan Kemp-Welch	Trevor Cooper	31 July 1981
In 1922, Ronald True (Christopher Cazenove) was convicted of the murder of a prostitute. Cast : Christopher Cazenove as Ronald True; Helen Cherry as Mrs. Grace Angus; Lewis Fiander as Sir Richard Muir; Charles Kay as Sir Henry Curtis Bennett; Susan Skipper as Mrs. Frances True; Michael Bruce as Henry Jacoby; George Pensotti as Gallagher; George Parsons as Freke Palmer; Judy Wilson as Emily Steel; Geoffrey Russell as Mr. Justice M'Cardle; Seymour Green as George Ramsay; Dennis Chinnery as Albert Burton; Tenniel Evans as Speed; Brian Orrell as Corbett; Eric Carte as James Armstrong; Paul Jerricho as Montague Morgan; Naomi Buch as Mary Wilson
12	5	"The Darlingest Boy"	Brian Mills	Michael Baker	7 August 1981
In 1923, Edith Thompson (Gayle Hunnicutt) was executed for the murder of her husband Percy. Cast : Gayle Hunnicutt as Edith Thompson; Christopher Villiers as Frederick Bywaters; Margaret Tyzack as Mrs. Lillian Bywaters; Terrence Hardiman as Mr. Cecil Whiteley, K.C.; Noel Johnson as Sir Thomas Inskip, K.C.; Charles Kay as Sir Henry Curtis Bennett, K.C.; Hugh Morton as Mr. Justice Shearman; Dennis Edwards as William Graydon; Ann Thornton as Avis Graydon; Jean Holness as Dora Pittard; Andrew Johns as Dr. Bernard Spilsbury; Theresa Watson as Ethel Hutton; John Grillo as Mr. Manners; Ray Armstrong as Mr. Bishop; Terence Soall as Dr. John Morton; Rex Arundel as Clerk of Court; Christopher Quinn as Jury Foreman
13	6	"Make It a Double"	Nicholas Ferguson	K.W. Ross	14 August 1981
In 1929, Neville Heath (Ian Charleson) brutally murdered two women in a killing spree. Cast : Ian Charleson as Neville Heath; Alick Hayes as Mr. Justice Morris; Jonathan Elsom as Mr. Anthony Hawke; Paul Arlington as Mr. J. D. Casswell KC; Alan Cullen as Mr. Mordant; Frank Elliott as Clerk of Court; Norma West as Miss Symonds; Kenneth Oxtoby as Mr. Watson; Nigel Bowden as Mr. Collins; Tom Chatto as Dr. Grierson; Christopher Ellison as Detective Inspector Spooner; Mary Allen as Mrs. Heath; Alan Foss as Mr. Heath; Sally Kinghorn as Rose; Roger Kemp as Dr. Hubert; Tom Harrison as Jury Foreman; Sheila Gill as Aunt Jessie
14	7	"A Boy's Best Friend"	Peter Moffatt	Frances Galleymore	21 August 1981
In 1929, Sidney Harry Fox (Tim Brierley) was accused of murdering his mother. Cast : Tim Brierley as Sidney Harry Fox; Phyllis Calvert as Rosaline Fox; John Tordoff as Mr. Fairfax; David Millett as Mr Davies; Richard Mathews as Justice Rowlatt; Charles Kay as Sir Henry Curtis Bennett, K.C.; Robert East as J.D. Cassels, K.C.; Derek Hockridge as Clerk of Court; Anna Lindup as Louise Bickmore; Robert Grange as Samuel Hopkins; Geoffrey Toone as Brigadier Cecil Winbolt; David Meyer as Mr Armstrong; Steve Gardner as Mr Eaves; Marina McConnell as Gwendoline Bugg; Arthur Hewlett as Mr. Biffen; Andrew Johns as Sir Bernard Spilsbury; Roger Llewellyn as Mr Dellow
