= Zuleika Robson =

British actress

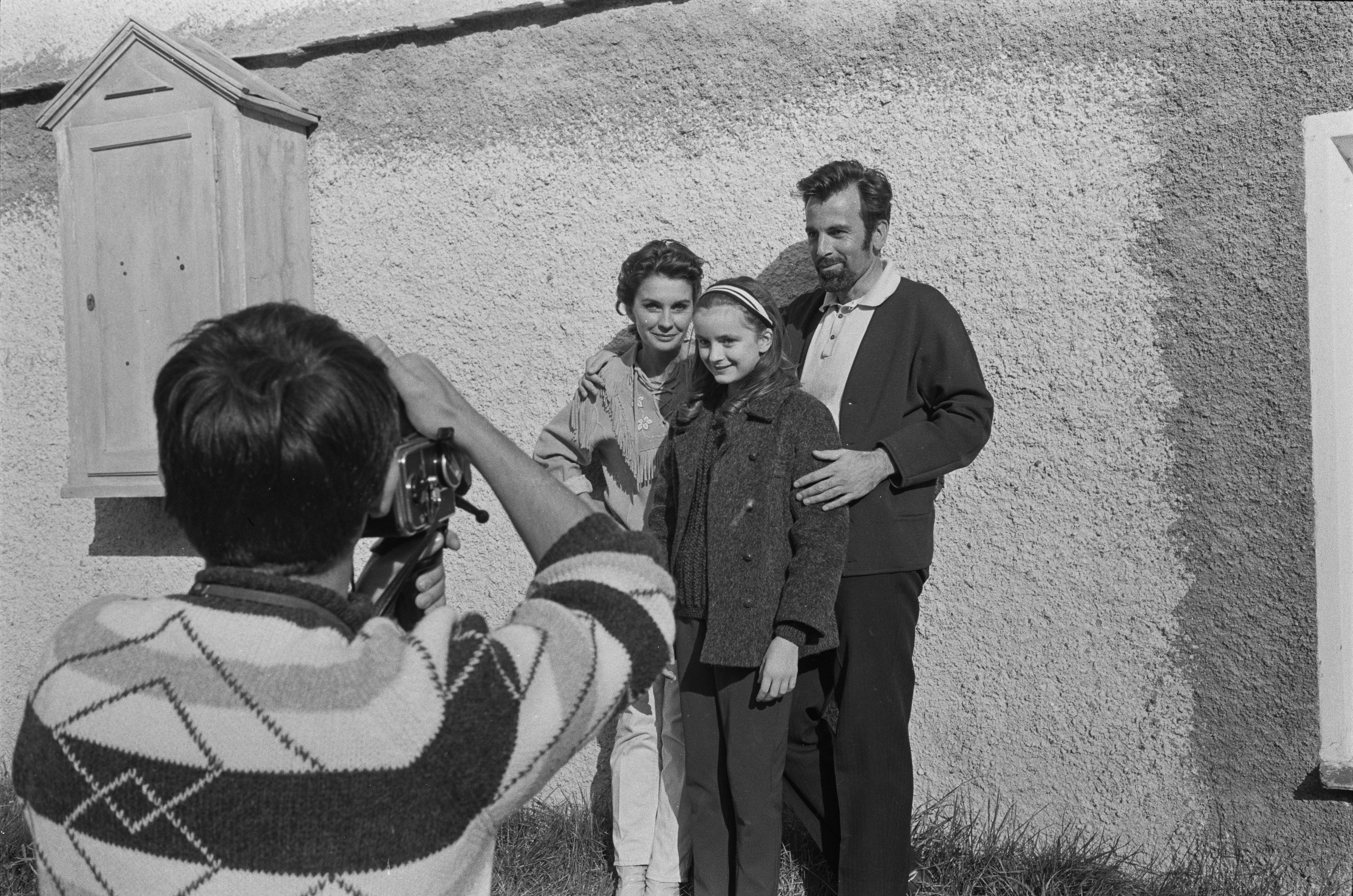
- Zuleika Robson (centre) with Jean Simmons and Maximilian Schell during the filming of Heidi (1968).
- Born: Zuleika Rosalind Miranda Robson; Acaster Malbis, West Riding of Yorkshire, United Kingdom
- Occupation: Actress

Zuleika Robson is a former British film and television actress and child performer. She began her career in the 1960s as a child actress, excelling in roles in children's classics.

== Early life ==
Robson was born in Acaster Malbis, West Riding of Yorkshire, United Kingdom. Named after Max Beerbohm's 1911 novel Zuleika Dobson, she discovered her talent for acting while a pupil at Sutherland House School in Cromer, partaking in the annual Cromer Festival. After her family moved from Sheringham to Nottingham, she became a pupil at Hethersett Old Hall School but due to her enthusiasm and dramatic ability, her parents agreed she should go for an audition and interview at the Corona Theatre School in London. Aged 13-and-a-half, Robson was accepted and took part in several radio broadcasts for schools. Before starting at the school, she was given a part in the television series Blackmail.

== Career ==
Her early and most notable roles include Susan in the 1967 BBC television adaptation of The Lion, the Witch and the Wardrobe, and Klara in the 1968 television film Heidi (also known as Heidi kehrt heim). She appeared in other children's productions such as the miniseries The Changes (1975), and the adaptations of Anne of Green Gables (1972) and Anne of Avonlea (1975).

As she entered young adulthood, Robson transitioned to roles in television dramas, thrillers, and art films. Her film credits include a minor role in the biographical drama Isadora (1968), the horror film The Blood on Satan's Claw (1971), and the thriller Revenge (1971), also known as Inn of the Frightened People.

Her television work also included appearances in series such as Bouquet of Barbed Wire (1976), Return of the Saint (1978), Crown Court, and the Granada TV children's drama Young Sherlock: The Mystery of the Manor House (1982), where she played the role of Charlotte.

Theatre roles included productions of "Equus", "Romeo and Juliet", "Alfie" and "Spring at Marino".

== Filmography ==
=== Film ===
Year	Title	Role	Notes	Ref.
1968	Isadora	Cast		
1971	The Blood on Satan's Claw	Coven Member		
1971	Revenge (also Inn of the Frightened People)	Jill Radford		
1978	Let's Get Laid	Thelma		

=== Television ===
Year	Title	Role	Notes	Ref.
1966	Blackmail		1 episode	
1967	The Lion, the Witch and the Wardrobe	Susan	TV series	
1967	Sexton Blake		1 episode	
1968	A Man of Our Times		2 episodes	
1968	The Growing Summer		6 episodes	
1968	Heidi	Klara	TV film	
1969	The Good Son, Armchair Theatre Series 14	Beverley	10 February 1969	
1969	Special Branch	Sheila Madgwick	1 episode	
1970	ITV Sunday Night Theatre, Married Alive	Henrietta Jardine	Episode aired Jun 6, 1970	
1972	Anne of Green Gables	Jane Andrews	Miniseries, appeared in 4 of 5 episodes	
1972	Crown Court	June Deacon	3 episodes	
1973	Hunter's Walk, Vanishing Trick	Sally Lawrence	Series 1, episode 5	
1974	Melissa	Mary Antrobus	1 episode	
1975	Anne of Avonlea	Jane Andrews	TV Miniseries	
1975	The Changes	Margaret	Miniseries	
1976	Bouquet of Barbed Wire	Nurse	1 episode	
1978	Return of the Saint	The Gent's Wife	1 episode	
1978	People Like Us		7 episodes	
1980	Lady Killers	Sarah	2 episodes	
1981	Break in the Sun	Van Driver	TV series	
1982	Young Sherlock: The Mystery of the Manor House	Charlotte	TV miniseries, 6 episodes	
