= Revenge (1971 film) =

British thriller by Sidney Hayers

- UK theatrical release poster
- Directed by: Sidney Hayers
- Written by: John Kruse
- Based on: story by John Kruse
- Produced by: George H. Brown
- Starring: Joan Collins; James Booth
- Cinematography: Ken Hodges
- Edited by: Anthony Palk
- Music by: Eric Rogers
- Production company: Peter Rogers Productions
- Distributed by: Rank Film Distributors (UK)
- Release date: 26 August 1971 (UK)
- Running time: 89 minutes
- Country: United Kingdom
- Language: English

Revenge is a 1971 British thriller film directed by Sidney Hayers and starring Joan Collins, James Booth and Sinéad Cusack. The screenplay was by John Kruse. It was released in the United States in May 1976 as Inn of the Frightened People.

A family seek brutal revenge on the man who they suspect attacked their daughter.

== Plot ==
Pub landlords Jim and Carol Radford are grieving for the death of their young daughter Jenny, who was raped and murdered by Seely; Jim has two other children by his first marriage, Lee and Jill. Seely is arrested for the crime by the Inspector, but ultimately released due to a lack of evidence. As well as Jenny, Seely is suspected of also killing the daughter of Jim's friend Harry. Seely himself lives a quiet, hermit-like existence, but he is observed stopping at a primary school near his house to watch the children.

Seeking revenge, Harry and Lee urge Jim to kidnap Seely and keep him in the cellar of his pub. After some persuasion, Jim agrees to the plan; they capture Seely, beat him and keep him locked beneath the pub. This puts pressure on the Radford family, who don't dare release him but are too afraid to kill him. Having Seely in the cellar puts a strain on the relationships within the family, especially between Carol and Lee, and also on the business, when Carol tries to prevent brewery deliveryman Fred from delivering the stock. Things reach a head when it seems that Seely may be innocent after all, and the relationships between Jim, Harry and Lee become more fractured.

== Cast ==
- James Booth as Jim Radford
- Joan Collins as Carol Radford
- Tom Marshall as Lee Radford
- Zuleika Robson as Jill Radford
- Ray Barrett as Harry
- Sinéad Cusack as Rose
- Kenneth Griffith as Seely
- Donald Morley as Inspector
- Barry Andrews as Sergeant
- Artro Morris as Jacko
- Patrick McAlinney as George
- Angus MacKay as priest
- Geoffrey Hughes as Fred, the brewery driver
- Nicola Critcher as Lucy

Tom Marshall, Zuleika Robson and Donald Morley had their voices dubbed by Nicky Henson, Michele Dotrice and Garfield Morgan respectively.

== Production ==
Peter Rogers had produced the Carry On series for the Rank Organisation and made an arrangement to produce other films for them, "thrillers and romantic subjects".

The film was shot in Pinewood Studios and on location in Buckinghamshire in January 1971.

Producer George Brown called it "a story about everyday people who take one fatal step in search of human justice." Ray Barrett called the film "a breakthrough for me" as he had been in The Troubleshooters TV series for six years.

== Home media ==
The United States video release was retitled Terror from Under the House. That version is available as a region-free DVD. The region 1 DVD is titled Revenge!

== Critical reception ==
The Monthly Film Bulletin wrote: "Peter Rogers owes his fame to the Carry On series, and his reputation for making people laugh will doubtless be consolidated by this abortive melodrama. Its crude lighting and the high-gloss ugliness of the sets seem a fitting match for the crude psychology of its unappealing characters. John Kruse's script plays fitfully with the idea of the captive as a catalyst for evil and, in more mundane terms, with the Dreadful Consequences of ordinary people taking the law into their own hands; but Seely's guilt (heavily signaled in Kenneth Griffith's sweet-sucking performance) rather undermines the second idea, while the instant nastiness of the other characters confines the first to the most perfunctory development. The grotesque improbability of the relationships (Atreus' house was no match for this) is further highlighted by the matter-of-fact suburban dialogue, with characters seriously suggesting nice cups of tea as antidotes to every excess of grief, lust and violence, and Joan Collins' put-upon housewife declaring 'I don't know what's come over us', as she eagerly submits to her stepson's rape."

Kine Weekly wrote: "A well-made, authentic-looking British thriller in the tough modern idiom. Meaty adult entertainment. This picture, full of ingenious twists and turns, has a good catch of red-herrings that, satisfyingly, manage to be fully justified and misleading at the same time. This playing fair with the audience helps sustain interest and makes the last-minute surprise climax all the more telling. ... The performances are all excellent, while the visual direction is interesting without ever being intrusive, and production values are more than adequate."

Variety said the film "never rises above programmer status".

The reviewer for the Birmingham Post said "I haven't seen such an ugly film in a very long time."

The Guardian wrote: "made me feel as though its makers ought to be put down inhumanely."

David McGillivray wrote in the Radio Times: "what begins as a serious examination of a growing social problem becomes increasingly melodramatic, ending in a blaze of hysterical shrieking and stabbing. Quite unconvincing, enjoyable for all the wrong reasons."

Leslie Halliwell said: "Crude melodrama set in Cold Comfort Farm country; efficient but unrewarding."

The Joan Collins Archive described it as "an entertaining slice of 70s sensationalism."
