= Heidi (1968 film) =

1968 American TV film by Delbert Mann

- Promotional poster
- Based on: Heidi by Johanna Spyri
- Teleplay by: Earl Hamner Jr.
- Directed by: Delbert Mann
- Starring: Maximilian Schell; Jean Simmons; Michael Redgrave; Jennifer Edwards; Walter Slezak; Zuleika Robson
- Theme music composer: John Williams
- Country of origin: United States
- Original language: English

Production
- Producers: Frederick H. Brogger; James Franciscus; Gyula Trebitsch
- Cinematography: Klaus von Rautenfeld
- Editors: Walter Boos; Donald J. Cohen
- Running time: 105 minutes

Original release
- Network: NBC
- Release: November 17, 1968

Heidi is an American made-for-TV film version of the 1880 novel of the same name by Johanna Spyri which debuted on November 17, 1968, on NBC. It starred actress Jennifer Edwards, stepdaughter of Julie Andrews and daughter of Blake Edwards, in the title role, alongside Maximilian Schell, Jean Simmons, and Michael Redgrave. The score was composed by John Williams. The film was sponsored by Timex.

Heidi became a part of sports and pop culture lore as NBC's decision to pull away from coverage of an American Football League (AFL) game between the New York Jets and the Oakland Raiders to air the film at its scheduled time of 7 p.m. Eastern, caused viewers to miss a frantic late comeback by the Raiders to win the game, prompting controversy and viewer complaints. The game became known as the "Heidi Game".

== Differences from the novel ==
The film altered the plot of the novel considerably, primarily by redefining the relationships of characters to one another. Heidi, instead of being the orphan of Grandfather's late son, becomes the orphan of the Grandfather's late daughter and her late husband; Dete becomes Heidi's aunt as the living but estranged daughter of the Grandfather. In addition, Heidi is further recast as Herr Sesemann's niece because of his late brother's marriage to Grandfather's late daughter. As Sesemann's niece, Heidi becomes a cousin rather than simply companion to Klara, who early in the film is negatively portrayed as a hateful and spoiled child. By casting Simmons as Fräulein Rottenmeier, governess for both Heidi and Klara, the film remakes Rottenmeier as an extremely sympathetic character; she becomes almost a surrogate mother to Heidi. This drastic character transformation removes the antagonism between the two, thus removing the tension which dominates and enlivens the novel. Rottenmeier's personality is changed and she falls in love with Sesemann, and he with her, a situation not included in the novel.

The film also added a subplot in which Heidi's grandfather, a church organist in this version, has long been unable to play because of a family tragedy, which is shown to be his daughter's marriage to Sesemann's brother and her subsequent death. At the end of the film, he regains his confidence, mounts the steps to the organ, and begins to play.

Another difference between the book and the film occurs during Klara's attempts at walking after Sesemann has accepted the Grandfather's invitation for Klara to visit Heidi in his home. In the novel, Sesemann's kindly and strong-willed mother teaches Heidi to read and to pray; she visits the girls on the Alp. Her character is cut completely from the film. In the novel, Peter becomes jealous of Heidi's attentions to Klara and deliberately destroys Klara's wheelchair so that the crippled girl will have to return home; the chain of events resulting from that destruction ends in Klara's taking her first successful steps on the Alp while leaning on Peter and Heidi. In the film, Fräulein Rottenmeier and Herr Sesemann visit the girls, and Grandfather deliberately leaves Klara alone on the mountains, knowing that she actually can walk but has been afraid to try. Klara struggles to get out of her wheelchair, knocking it over and falling down in the process. As she tries to get up, she sees her father, Herr Sesemann, looking at her encouragingly, and haltingly walks towards him. The film ends with a significant glance between Fraulein Rottenmeier and Herr Sesemann, a glance which promises a future for them together.

== Cast ==
- Jennifer Edwards as Heidi
- Michael Redgrave as Grandfather
- Maximilian Schell as Richard Sessemann
- Jean Simmons as Frl. Rottenmeier
- Walter Slezak as Father Richter
- Peter van Eyck as Dr. Bernd Reboux
- Zuleika Robson as Klara
- John Moulder-Brown as Peter (as John M. Brown)
- Karl Lieffen as Sebastian
- Elisabeth Neumann-Viertel as Grandmother (as Elisabeth Neumann)
- Miriam Spoerri as Aunt Dete

== Production ==
The film was shot on location in the Swiss and German Alps. The exterior shots depicting Dörfli were filmed in the villages of Guarda and Ardez in the Engadine valley, canton Graubunden (Grisons) in Switzerland. The church where Father Richter serves is the Katholische Kirche in Ardez. The exterior shots of historic Frankfurt were in fact filmed in Lübeck; Heidi and the boy with the monkey walk past the Salzspeicher buildings and eventually reach St Peter's Church, Lübeck, described as the fictional "St. Michael's" in the film. The scene in the church tower where Heidi looks for the mountains was also filmed there.

== Broadcast ==
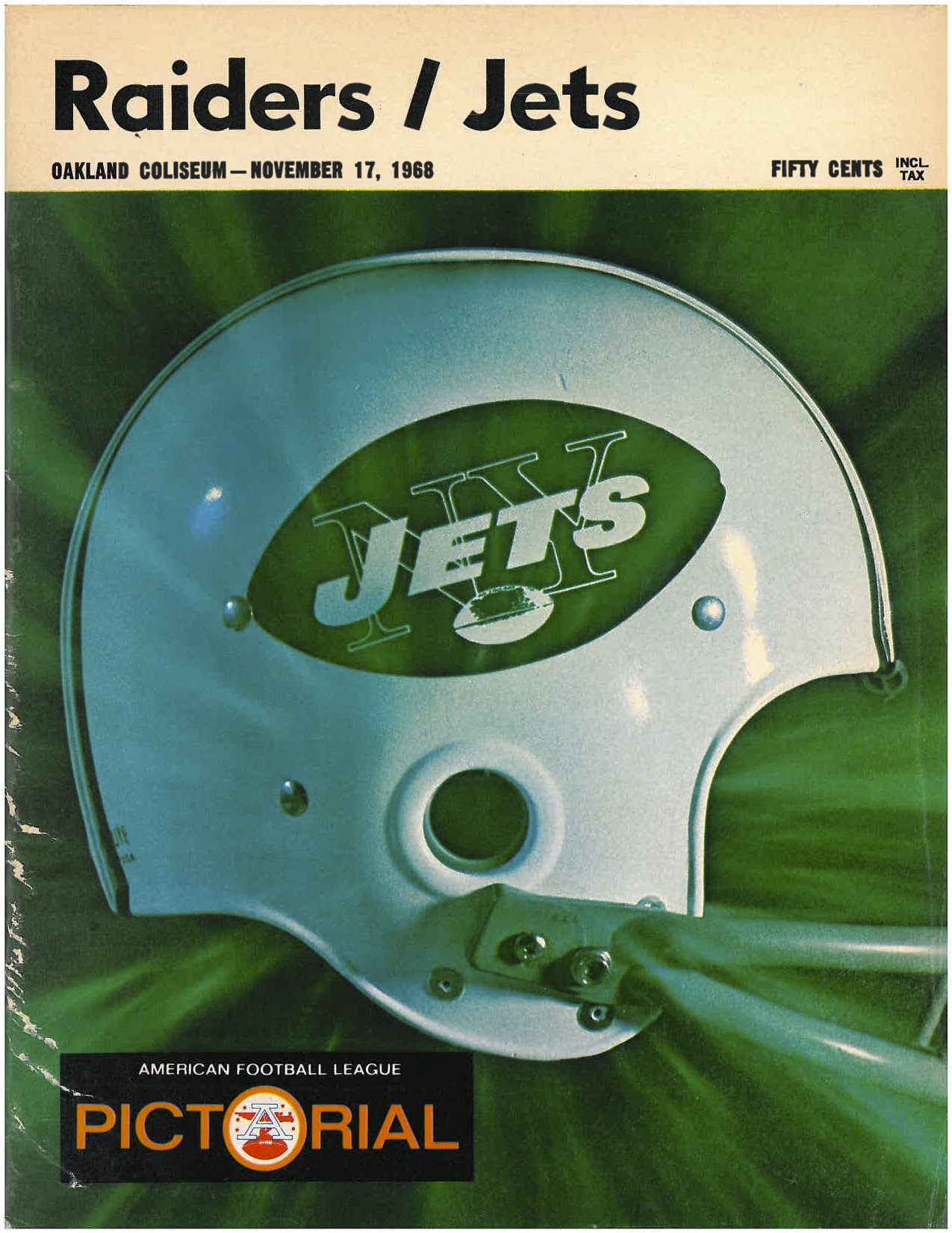
NBC's decision to cut away from the Jets-Raiders game to air Heidi at 7 p.m. sharp (on the east coast) is noted as one of the most controversial occurrences in televised sporting history.

On November 17, 1968, the film's premiere on NBC unexpectedly became one of the most notorious moments in American broadcasting because it interrupted the conclusion of a game between the American Football League's two top teams—the Oakland Raiders and New York Jets during the 1968 AFL season. NBC's network management had taken the decision to show the entire game until its completion even though it was contractually obligated to begin the broadcast of Heidi on the East Coast at 7:00 p.m. ET; the film's premiere would be delayed by the overrunning game. The number of East Coast viewers calling NBC asking for confirmation that the game would be shown to the end caused all 26 phone lines at NBC's switchboard to fuse.

The network management's decision was not conveyed to the NBC's control facility in New York. Consequently, Heidi began at 7:00 p.m. as scheduled, ending the East Coast broadcast of the Raiders–Jets game. Shortly afterward, Oakland scored two touchdowns within the final minute, winning the game 43–32 in a major upset.

Nevertheless, the film was the highest viewed television program of the week and most watched television film of all time with a Nielsen rating of 31.8 rating and an audience share of 47%. It was surpassed as the most watched television film of all time by 1971's Brian's Song.
