= Killanne =

Village in County Wexford, Ireland

Coordinates: 52°31′19″N 6°44′42″W

Killanne (or Killann, Killane) (Irish: Cill Anna) is a rural village roughly 12 kilometres (7 mi) west of Enniscorthy, County Wexford, Ireland.

== Notable people ==
Kate Webster, who was hanged for the murder of Julia Martha Thomas, was born around 1849 in Killanne as Kate Lawler at her family's home.

United Irish leader John Kelly, who died in 1798, was from Killanne, as referenced by "Kelly, the Boy From Killane", an Irish song about the 1798 rebellion.

== See also ==
- List of populated places in the Republic of Ireland
