= Nicholas Ferguson =

English artist and television director

- Born: 2 June 1938 (age 88); London, United Kingdom
- Occupation: Television Director / Producer
- Notable work: Coronation Street, Hollyoaks, Family Affairs

Nicholas Ferguson (born 2 June 1938) is an English artist and television director.

== Education ==
Born in London, Ferguson's artistic career started at the Chelsea College of Art before moving on to University College London's Slade School of Art. At the Slade he studied under William Coldstream, Lucian Freud and Nicholas Georgiadis.

== Television ==
During the 1960s, Ferguson worked as an art director for Ready Steady Go!, a popular music show broadcast on ITV made by Associated-Rediffusion. He then directed "Step into Christmas" for Elton John and other music videos including Paul McCartney's "Mull of Kintyre" and David Bowie's "Heroes" in 1977.

He later went on to direct a number of soap operas including Coronation Street, Families, Family Affairs and spin-offs from Hollyoaks, including Hollyoaks Let Loose. He also directed two cult music programmes for Granada Television, Marc! presented by the musician Marc Bolan and So It Goes, fronted by Tony Wilson. He directed multiple episodes of the 1980s series Lady Killers. As a freelance director, Ferguson has worked on many productions within the UK Independent television network.

== Fine art ==
As well as a televisionist, Ferguson has maintained his personal passion for creating fine art, particularly abstract painting.

== Sources ==
- Nicholas Ferguson at IMDb
