= Sidney Harry Fox =

British petty swindler and convicted murderer (1899–1930)

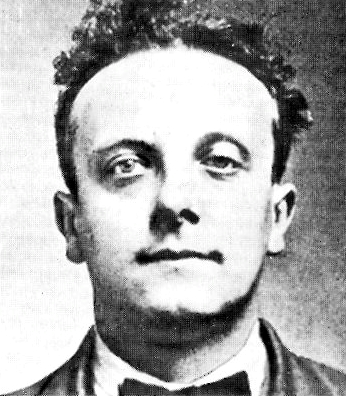
Sidney Harry Fox, police mugshot

Sidney Harry Fox (1899 – 8 April 1930) was a British petty swindler and convicted murderer. He was executed for the murder of his mother in an attempt to obtain money from an insurance policy on her life. His case is unusual in that it is a rare example of a known matricide in the United Kingdom.

His murder was detected by then recent advances in forensic pathology. However, in 2021, an episode of Murder, Mystery and My Family suggested that his conviction was 'unsafe', stating it likely that his mother died of heart failure and the fire was indeed accidental.

== Early life ==
Fox was described as "the son of decent working Norfolk parents". His mother, the former Rosaline Rallison (b.1866) had married railway porter William George Fox in 1887, and had three sons by him (William Edward James in 1888, Reginald Mitchell in 1891 and Cecil Rallison in 1894). However, eldest son William later told the press that his father had left home when he was six years old and that Sidney was therefore his illegitimate half-brother.

Fox was in trouble in his teens as a petty thief while in service at good houses, for which he was birched. Learning from his association with people of quality, he later developed a role as a plausible, genteel con-man until World War I, when he obtained a job in a London bank and proceeded to forge cheques on the accounts of his customers. In 1916, when his dishonesty was discovered, Britain was in the middle of the Great War and needed soldiers. Fox was offered immunity from prosecution on condition that he enlisted in the Army, however he enlisted in the Royal Air Force, getting an officer's commission by claiming to be an Old Etonian. He drew on his banking experience to forge cheques on his brother officers’ accounts. He was caught and sentenced to three months in prison, ending his military career.

== The murder ==
Fox and his mother Rosaline lived on 18 shillings per week (£32 equivalent in 2010) between them, supplementing this by cashing worthless cheques and moving from town to town. In 1927, Fox was imprisoned for fraud and his mother committed to the workhouse. On his release, he commenced a bogus affair with a Mrs Morse for mercenary reasons; she knew nothing of his homosexuality. He used the access given to steal her jewellery, and he also insured her life for £6000 (£213342 in 2010). Mrs Morse awoke one evening to find the gas-tap in her bedroom turned on. The resultant outcry led to a divorce action being filed by Mr. Morse, naming Fox as co-respondent. Fox was arrested on several charges, imprisoned for the jewellery theft and released in March 1929; he and his mother found it convenient to renew their travelling life.

In April 1929 Fox persuaded his mother to make a will in his favour, despite her poverty, and on 1 May insured her life against accidental death, the policy to expire on 23 October. Some months later, they arrived at a hotel in Margate without any luggage and booked rooms. A week later, on 23 October, Fox and his mother ate dinner, Fox buying a half-bottle of port as a "nightcap" for her. At 11.40 pm that same evening, Fox raised the alarm that there was a fire in his mother's room, and her partly clad body was pulled out of it by another guest.

Although a doctor certified suffocation and shock as the cause of death, and Rosaline Fox was buried in Norfolk a week later, the insurance investigators had examined the room and were suspicious. They believed that a patch of unburnt carpet between Mrs Fox's body and the gas stove, supposedly the source of the flames, made Fox's story inconsistent. As a result, Mrs Fox's body was exhumed for forensic examination.

Sir Bernard Spilsbury and Dr Roche Lynch performed the post-mortem and deduced that Mrs Fox had been strangled, due to a bruise on her larynx, and the absence of soot in her lungs showed that she had been dead before the fire had started. As a result, Fox was arrested and charged with the murder. In 2021, in an episode of Murder, Mystery and My Family, the strangulation theory that ultimately condemned Fox was challenged - instead attributing the "bruising" seen by Spilsbury to be a Prinsloo-Gordon Hemorrhage. This "forensic red herring" and modern medical opinion establishing that what Spilsbury had seen was not a bruise are discussed in LethalWitness, see below, first published in 2007.

== Trial ==
Fox was tried at Lewes Assizes before Mr Justice Rowlett and a jury, with Sir Henry Curtis-Bennett KC and Sir William Jowitt KC (then the Attorney-General) prosecuting, and J. D. Cassels KC defending. The defence were unable to challenge the evidence given by Spilsbury since the bruise on Mrs Fox's larynx had disappeared due to decomposition by the time their experts had examined it. Jowitt subjected Fox to a ferocious cross-examination, and Fox's excuse that he had closed his mother's door "so that smoke should not spread into the hotel" appeared to be cowardly. The jury therefore convicted Fox and he was hanged at Maidstone Jail on 8 April 1930, the Home Secretary having declined to intervene. Cassels later remarked that Fox might have saved himself by answering "I don't know" to Jowitt's question "why did you shut the door?"

== Dramatisations ==
Around 1948, the radio series "Secrets of Scotland Yard" dramatised the story under the title "Smoke Clings to the Hair".

The case was dramatised as "Murder at The Metropole" in 1976 as part of the "Killers" television series; Fox was played by Christopher Timothy.

A later (1981) version, produced by Granada Television under the title "Lady Killers: A Boy's Best Friend", starred Tim Brierley.
