= Elizabeth Lyon (criminal) =

English thief and prostitute (fl. c. 1722–1726)

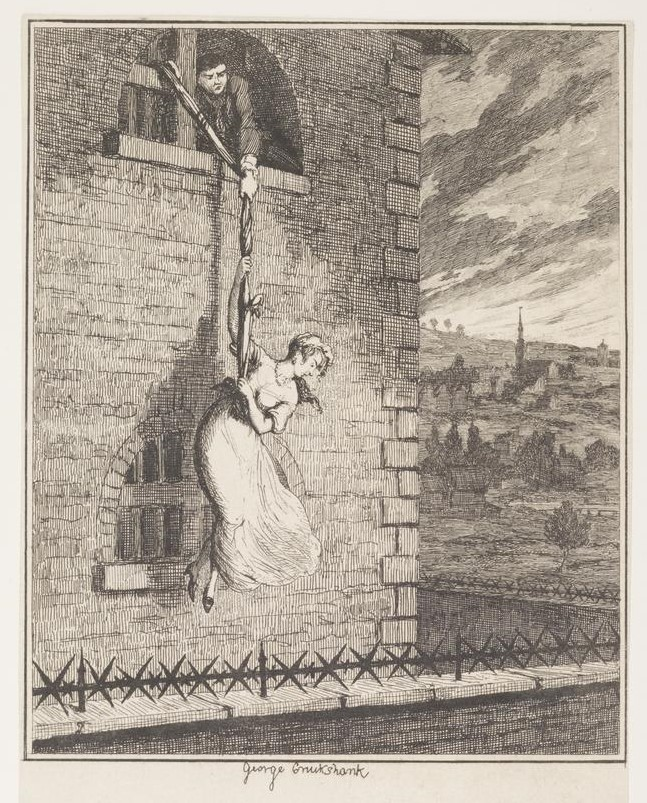
Lyon escaping from New Prison in Clerkenwell, aided by Jack Sheppard. The artist, George Cruikshank, decided to make Lyon a slender woman in the etching; in reality she was described as being large.

Elizabeth Lyon (fl. c. 1722–1726), nicknamed Edgworth Bess or Edgware Bess, was an English thief, prostitute and the partner of the criminal Jack Sheppard. Little is known about her background or her early life, but it is known that she was working as a prostitute at the Black Lyon alehouse in London by 1722 or 1723. Here she met Sheppard—at the time an apprentice carpenter—and the two began a relationship.

At Lyon's instigation, Sheppard soon began his career in crime, first stealing from places where he worked before moving into housebreaking; Lyon and his brother became his accomplices. Sheppard was arrested for his crimes on several occasions, invariably breaking out soon after incarceration, normally assisted by Lyon. In May 1724 she was arrested when visiting him in prison, so together the pair broke out of New Prison into the adjoining Clerkenwell Bridewell prison, then out of that to freedom.

After Sheppard's execution in November 1724, Lyon entered into relationships with other men who were, or became, involved in housebreaking, sometimes accompanying them to assist in perpetrating the crimes. She was arrested in March 1726 and transported to the Province of Maryland—then a British colony in North America—in October; her name does not appear in official sources after that date. Lyon's notoriety is based on her connection to Sheppard, and in the years following his execution, novels were published and plays performed that retold his and Lyon's story.

== Biography ==
=== Early life ===
Lyon was born in Edgware, Middlesex. Nothing is known about her background or early life, and it is uncertain whether Lyon was her maiden or married name. It is possible that Lyon had a partner who was an absentee soldier, although sources differ over whether she was his wife, mistress or whether she prostituted herself to him. Philip Sugden, her biographer for the Oxford Dictionary of National Biography, writes that she may be the same person as the Elizabeth Miller, alias Lyon, who stole silk and cambric from her landlord, John Davenport, in St Peter, Westcheap, London. Miller was convicted of the crime at the Old Bailey in October 1721 and her hand was branded.

=== Life with Jack Sheppard ===
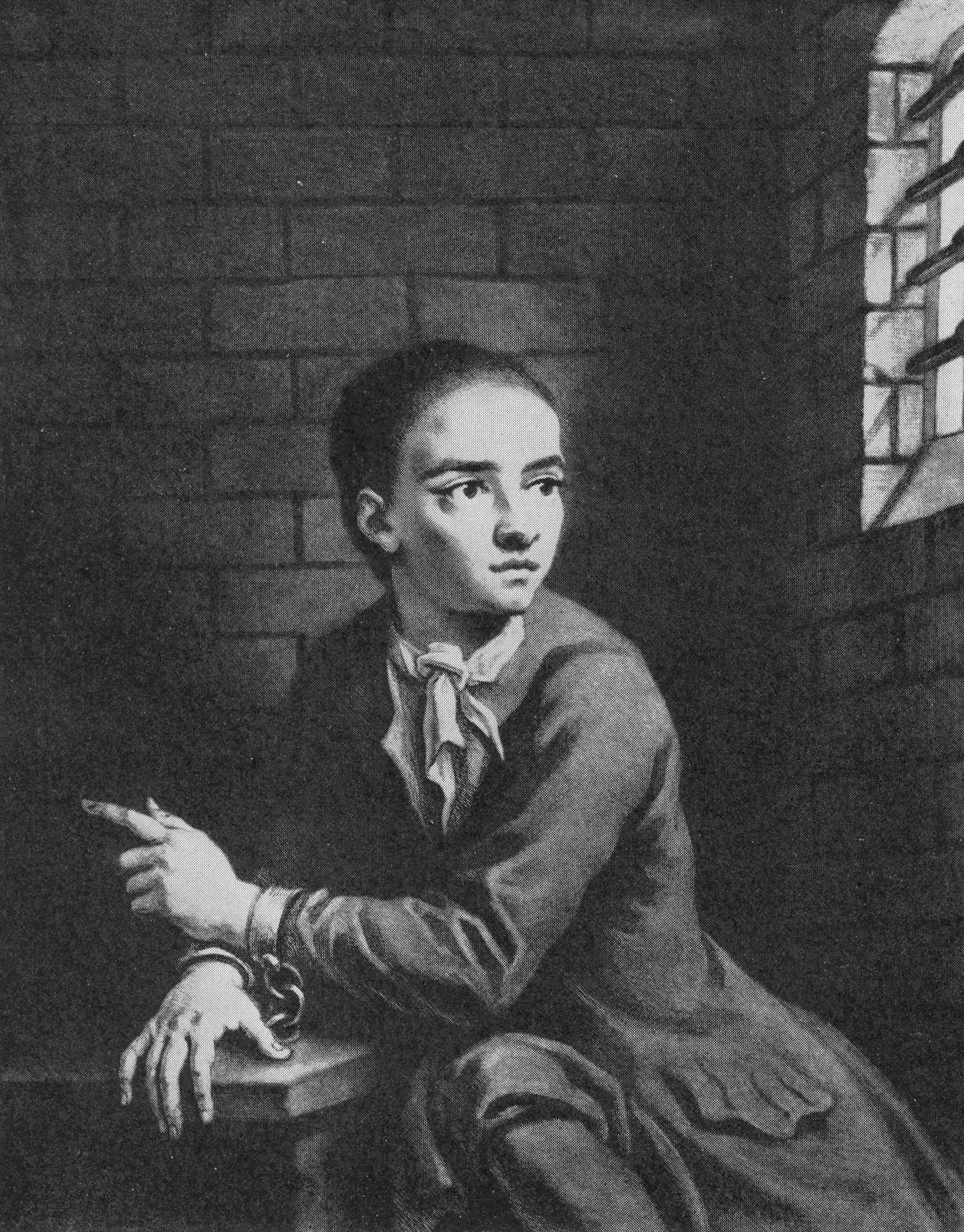
Jack Sheppard in Newgate Prison awaiting execution

In 1722 or 1723 Lyon was working as a prostitute at the Black Lyon alehouse, an outlet run by Joseph Hinds, a button-mould maker in Lewkenor's Lane, St Giles, London. She was known as "Edgworth Bess" by the drinkers there. (Note: Most sources refer to Lyon's nickname as "Edgworth Bess", but Steadman renders it as "Edgware Bess". The writer Mark Herber observes her nickname "Edgworth Bess" was because she was born in what was called Edgworth at the time; it has since been renamed Edgware.) Hinds had several prostitutes working out of the tavern; they would flirt with the drinkers to encourage them to spend more money. Lyon met one of the tavern's customers, Jack Sheppard; at the time he was apprenticed to a carpenter in Drury Lane, where he also learned lock-making—and lock-picking. Sheppard is said to have been enamoured with her and the two soon entered into a relationship. She is described as a large woman and he as a small—he was only 5 feet 4 inches (1.63 m) tall—and slight man.

Lyon encouraged Sheppard to begin a career in thievery; he began by stealing two silver spoons from the Rummer tavern in Charing Cross where he was doing some carpentry. In July 1723 Lyon was arrested—either for creating a disturbance or for stealing a gold ring—and taken to the St Giles's Roundhouse. Sheppard broke into the building, knocked over the beadle and freed Lyon. Shortly after this, in August 1723, Sheppard left his apprenticeship and moved to Fulham with Lyon. Sheppard soon graduated to housebreaking and Lyon became his accomplice, along with Sheppard's own brother, Thomas.

In May 1724 Sheppard was arrested and held in the St Ann's roundhouse. When Lyon visited him the next day, she was arrested as a possible accomplice and held. They were both then placed in the New Prison in Clerkenwell; they claimed they were husband and wife and were therefore given a cell together. The gaoler had heard that Sheppard had escaped from his previous imprisonment, so fitted him with chains and weighed him down with two weights, each weighing 14 pounds (6.4 kg). After some friends visited and smuggled tools to the couple, Sheppard sawed through his weights and an iron bar before drilling through a 9 inches (23 cm) oak beam. They fabricated ropes from sheets, gowns and Lyon's petticoats and climbed down 25 feet (7.6 m). What they did not realise is that they had climbed down from New Prison into the adjoining Clerkenwell Bridewell prison. The couple scaled the 22 feet (6.7 m) walls and escaped.

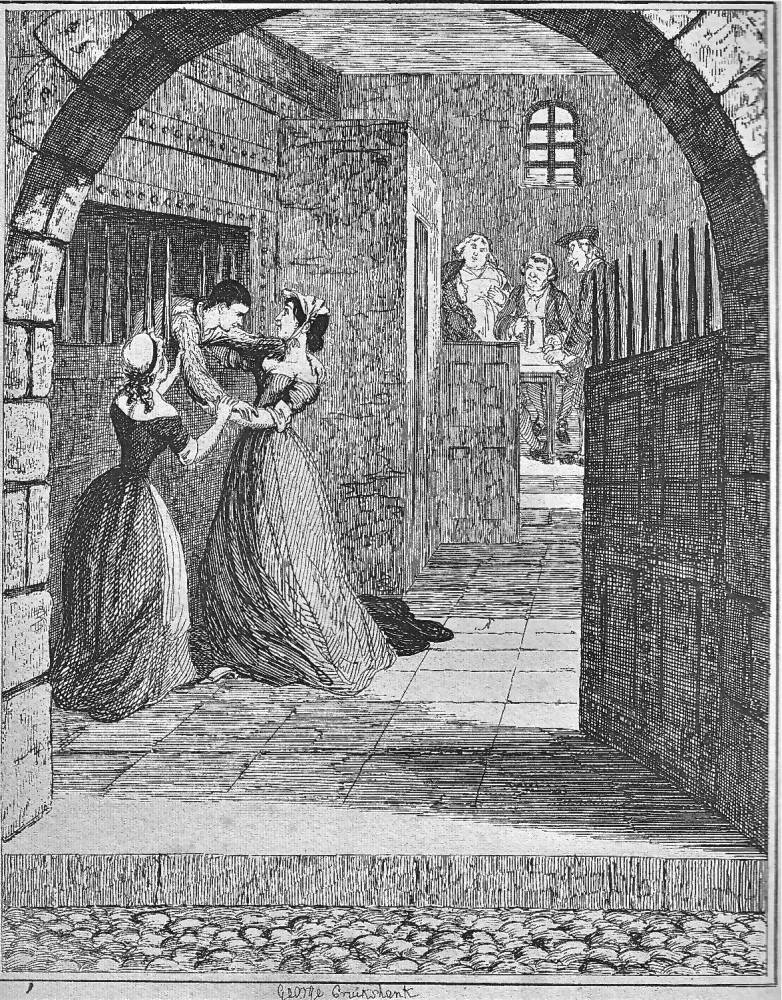
Lyon and Polly Maggot helping Sheppard escape from Newgate Prison

Jonathan Wild—a vigilante known as the "Thief-Taker General"—joined the chase for Sheppard. He joined Lyon in a brandy house in Temple Bar and either threatened her or got her drunk; she gave the details of where Sheppard could be found. He was subsequently arrested and taken to Newgate Prison. On 13 August 1724 he was tried and found guilty. He pleaded for transportation, but was sentenced to death by hanging. His execution was scheduled for 4 September and he was returned to Newgate where he was given the Condemned Hold, the cell given to prisoners awaiting their execution. The writer Aaron Skirboll described it as "one of the safest cells in all of England". Sheppard began sawing through one of the iron bars of the cell. By 31 August he had created enough space to squeeze through. Lyon and her friend, the prostitute Polly Maggot, helped Sheppard through the gap and provided him with a set of women's clothes; he walked out of the prison's front gates.

After the escape Lyon and Sheppard went to a tavern in Westminster and then to another in Holborn, where he removed the chains and fetters he was still wearing. She was arrested the day after his escape and given emetics to force her to say where Sheppard was hiding, but to no avail. She was held for three months; it was the last time the two would meet. He evaded capture for ten days but was rearrested on Finchley Common on 10 September and executed on 16 November 1724 at Tyburn. (Note: After his arrest Sheppard was returned to Newgate and kept in a fourth-floor cell nicknamed "the castle"; Sugden reports that he was "fettered and handcuffed, and his fetters were secured to an iron staple in the floor by a great horse padlock". Despite the precautions, on 15 October he managed to escape again. He was recaptured in 31 October in a brandy shop in Drury Lane, where he was very drunk and wearing some of the fine clothes he had stolen a few days before.)

On the day of his execution a pamphlet was printed. Although it showed Sheppard as the author, it was likely to have been written by Daniel Defoe; the writer Horace Bleackley suggests it was possible that some of the content could have come from conversations between Defoe and Sheppard. In the pamphlet, the author describes her as "a more wicked, deceitful and lascivious wretch there is not living in England. She has prov'd my bane". He also allocated the blame for his downfall on Hind and Lyon:

After all I may justly lay the blame of my temporal and ... my eternal ruin on Joseph Hind, a button-mould maker, who formerly kept the Black Lyon alehouse in Drury Lane; the frequenting of this wicked house brought me acquainted with Elizabeth Lyon, and with a train of vices, as before I was altogether a stranger to.

=== After Sheppard ===
Lyon continued her life of crime after Sheppard's death, and in doing so she "exercised a similarly profound influence over other youths", according to Sugden. In March 1725 Parker's London News reported that Lyon was convicted of "seducing a shopkeeper's son to go a-thieving with her"; she was sent to Tothill Fields Bridewell, a prison in Westminster. By the middle of the year, she was living with a painter, James Little. James Guthrie, the chaplain of Newgate, thought that Lyon "hurried him headlong to his destruction", although he had been involved in crime before the couple met. Little was hanged for his crimes in November 1725.

By March 1726 Lyon was in a relationship with John Smith, who was employed by Edward Bury, a butcher who worked in Allen Street, Clerkenwell. Lyon and Smith were arrested for stealing from Bury six silver spoons, silver tongs, a silver strainer, a gown and a handkerchief. At her trial Smith placed the blame on Lyon, telling the court "She persuaded me to rob my masters house, and said she'd go with me, and put me in the way. So I was drunk and we went together." One witness said they had seen Lyon with the spoons while drinking with Smith. The witness stated Lyon had told people the spoons were left to her by Sheppard and that she had retrieved them from a pawnbroker. Lyon was found guilty and sentenced to seven years' transportation. She sailed on the Loyal Margaret, landing in the Province of Maryland in October 1726. It is not known what happened to her after that.

== Legacy ==
Because of her connection to Sheppard, Lyon achieved a measure of fame in years following her death, including during the Victorian era. Such works included the anonymously written 1839 novel The History of Jack Sheppard: His Wonderful Exploits and Escapes; the biographer Stewart Marsh Ellis writes that Lyon "is amusingly translated from the Amazon strumpet of fact into an innocent and fragile milkmaid of fifteen, with flaxen hair, dazzling white skin, and eyes of clear blue". Also in 1839 the novelist William Harrison Ainsworth published Jack Sheppard; A Romance. The book was illustrated by George Cruikshank, who decided to portray Lyon, who had been a large woman, as physically slender. Other works in which Lyon appeared are the anonymously written Edgeworth Bess, or, Shephard in Danger (1867) and Joseph Hatton's 1899 work When Rogues Fall Out. Lyon was also used as a character in several stage plays written about Sheppard and in one film, Where's Jack? (1969) produced by James Clavell, portrayed by Fiona Lewis.

== Notes and references ==
=== Sources ===
==== Books ====
- Bleackley, Horace (1933). Jack Sheppard. Edinburgh: William Hodge & Company. OCLC 608481012.
  - Ellis, S. M. "In Literature and Drama". In Bleackley (1933), pp. 89–126.
- Coldham, Peter Wilson (1988). The Complete Book of Emigrants in Bondage, 1614–1775. Baltimore, Maryland: Genealogical Pub. Co. ISBN 978-0-8063-1221-7.
- Ellinghausen, Laurie (2018). Pirates, Traitors, and Apostates: Renegade Identities in Early Modern English Writing. Toronto: University of Toronto Press. ISBN 978-1-4875-0268-3.
- Golden, Catherine J. (2017). Serials to Graphic Novels: The Evolution of the Victorian Illustrated Book. Gainesville, Florida: University Press of Florida. ISBN 978-0-8130-6229-7.
- Grovier, Kelly (2008). The Gaol: The Story of Newgate, London's Most Notorious Prison. London: John Murray. ISBN 978-0-7195-6132-0.
- Halliday, Stephen (2006). Newgate: London's Prototype of Hell. Stroud, Gloucestershire: Sutton. ISBN 978-0-7509-3895-2.
- Hamerton, Christopher (2023). Devilry, Deviance and Public Sphere: The Social Discovery of Moral Panic in Eighteenth Century London. Cham: Palgrave Macmillan. doi:10.1007/978-3-031-14883-5. ISBN 978-3-0311-4882-8.
- Herber, Mark D. (2002). Criminal London: A Pictorial History from Medieval Times to 1939. Chichester, West Sussex: Phillimore & Co. ISBN 978-1-8607-7199-6.
- Hibbert, Christopher (1957). The Road to Tyburn: The Story of Jack Sheppard and the Eighteenth-century London Underworld. New York: The World Publishing Company. OCLC 319811.
- Howson, Gerald (1987). It Takes a Thief: The Life and Times of Jonathan Wild. London: Cresset Library. ISBN 978-0-0917-0861-0.
- Linebaugh, Peter (1993). The London Hanged: Crime and Civil Society in the Eighteenth Century. Cambridge University Press. ISBN 978-0-5214-5758-3.
- Linnane, Fergus (2004). London's Underworld: Three Centuries of Vice and Crime. London: Robson. ISBN 978-1-8610-5742-6.
- Rawlings, Philip (1992). Drunks, Whores and Idle Apprentices: Criminal Biographies of the Eighteenth Century. London: Routledge. ISBN 978-0-4150-5056-2.
- Sheppard, Jack (1724). A Narrative of all the Robberies, Escapes etc of John Sheppard. London: John Applebee. OCLC 1063047538.
- Skirboll, Aaron (2014). The Thief-taker Hangings: How Daniel Defoe, Jonathan Wild and Jack Sheppard Captivated London and Created the Celebrity Criminal. Guilford, Connecticut: Lyons Press. ISBN 978-0-7627-9148-4.

==== Websites ====
- "Elizabeth Lyon. Theft; Burglary. 2nd March 1726". Old Bailey Proceedings Online. Archived from the original on 20 October 2025.
- "Ordinary's Account. 3rd November 1725". Old Bailey Proceedings Online. Archived from the original on 12 November 2025.
- "Punishment summary. 2nd March 1726". Old Bailey Proceedings Online. Archived from the original on 22 October 2025.
- Sugden, Philip (2004). "Lyon, Elizabeth [nicknamed Edgware Bess]". Oxford Dictionary of National Biography (online ed.). Oxford University Press. doi:10.1093/ref:odnb/62078. (Subscription, Wikipedia Library access or UK public library membership required.)
- Sugden, Philip (2017). "Sheppard, John [Jack]". Oxford Dictionary of National Biography (online ed.). Oxford University Press. doi:10.1093/ref:odnb/25343. (Subscription, Wikipedia Library access or UK public library membership required.)
- "Where's Jack?". British Film Institute.
