= Elizabeth Lyon =

Elizabeth Lyon may refer to:

- Elizabeth Lyon, prostitute, lover of English thief, Jack Sheppard
- Elizabeth Lyon, Countess of Strathmore

== See also ==
- Elizabeth Bowes-Lyon, wife of George VI of the United Kingdom and mother of Elizabeth II
