= J. P. Wearing =

Anglo-American theatre historian and professor

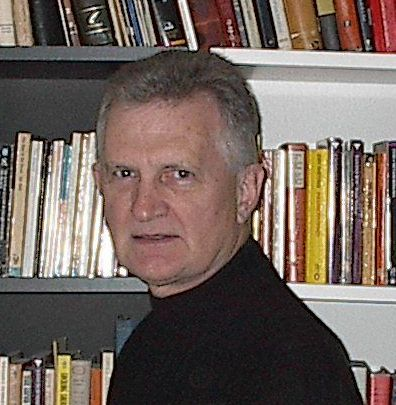
J. P. Wearing in 2007

John Peter Wearing (born 1 March 1945) is an Anglo-American theatre historian and professor, who has written about nineteenth and twentieth-century drama and theatre, including The Shakespeare Diaries: A Fictional Autobiography, published in 2007. He has also written and edited books on George Bernard Shaw, Arthur Wing Pinero, reference series on the London theatre from 1890 to 1980, and theatrical biographies, among other subjects. As a professor of English literature, Wearing has specialised in Shakespeare and modern drama.

== Early life and education ==
Wearing, who publishes under the name J. P. Wearing, was born in Birmingham and grew up in Pelsall. At Cannock Grammar School, he became Head Boy and sang in the church choir. He studied English literature at the University of Wales (then called the University College of Swansea), graduating in 1967 with a B.A. degree (magna cum laude). The next year he received an M.A. degree from the University of Saskatchewan. He earned a PhD degree from the University of Wales in 1971. He has a brother named Michael.

== Career ==
In 1971, Wearing began teaching at the University of Alberta, founding, together with L. W. Conolly, the journal Nineteenth Century Theatre Research, which he edited until 1986. He was also a theatre critic on CKUA Radio in 1973–74. Wearing moved to the US and joined the University of Arizona in 1974, teaching Shakespeare and modern drama until 1999. He has been honoured with a Guggenheim Fellowship (1978–79) and a four-year research grant for his extensive series on the London theatre from the National Endowment for the Humanities (1987–91). Since 1999, he has held the post of Professor Emeritus of English at the University of Arizona.

Since the 1970s, Wearing has written and edited books on Bernard Shaw and Arthur Wing Pinero, fictionalised "Shakespeare Diaries", a 16-volume series on London theatre from 1890 to 1959 that he updated and expanded in 2014 (an additional volume covers 1960–1980), and an index of American and British theatrical biographies that he updated and expanded in 2012. His articles include eleven entries for the Oxford Dictionary of National Biography on people including Pinero, William Archer, George Alexander, John Hare, Augustus Harris, Samuel Phelps and Mary Ebsworth.

== Critical reception of Wearing's works ==
Wearing's research and writing have been praised. His volume of the collected letters of Arthur Wing Pinero was called "probably the most important material published on Pinero since his death.... Wearing has written an excellent introduction and valuable explanatory headnotes for each letter, a task that looks deceptively easy." A review of Wearing's 16-volume series on the London Stage stated: "In his remarkable series, J. P. Wearing... has chosen to give us a chronological listing of works... presented in major London theatres since 1890, a series now covering seven decades. I know of no other venture on this scale making available the theatrical riches of a great modern city in this detailed way.... Here is a wonderful place to start research." Other reviews call the London Stage volumes "invaluable" and "thoroughly accurate" and state: "[T]here is a proverbial mine of useful information here, sensibly organized and, within [limits], well indexed. Scholarship on the theatre covered by these volumes will surely become a rich beneficiary of Wearing's industry and good judgment."

A review of Wearing's American and British Theatrical Biography: A Directory concludes, "nowhere, aside from Wearing, can one find such a comprehensive listing of basic biographical information for America and Britain spanning the long history of theatrical activity in those countries and nicely digested in the pages of one volume. Like Wearing's previous scholarship, the present work addresses a demonstrable need, filling a notable gap in a practical, efficient, and serviceable way."

In 2012, Wearing expanded his 1979 work as American and British Theatrical Biographies: An Index. Booklist's review stated that the work "provides an excellent starting point for anyone taking on the task of research in the history of the American and British theater. ... film and television actors are excluded unless they have actually appeared onstage. Artists performing in other theatrical arenas, such as opera, dance, circus, music, and music halls, are included, as are critics and others in stage-related occupations." In 2013 to 2014, Wearing updated and expanded his series on The London Stage and added an Accumulated Indexes volume. American Reference Books Annual wrote: "These works are a must-have for theater departments, and really any library interested in play productions."

== Books ==
- American and British Theatrical Biography: A Directory, The Scarecrow Press (1979) ISBN 0-8108-1201-0
- American and British Theatrical Biographies: An Index, The Scarecrow Press (2012) ISBN 0-8108-8238-8
- Arthur Wing Pinero: The Second Mrs. Tanqueray, a critical and contextual edition (ed. Wearing), Broadview Press (2007) ISBN 1-55111-687-1
- Bernard Shaw and Nancy Astor: Selected Correspondence of Bernard Shaw (ed. Wearing), University of Toronto Press (2005) ISBN 0-8020-3752-6
- Bernard Shaw: Arms and the Man (critical edition), Methuen Drama (2008) ISBN 0-7136-7998-0
- Bernard Shaw: On War (ed. Wearing), Hesperus Press (2009) ISBN 1-8439-1611-8
- The Collected Letters of Sir Arthur Pinero (ed. Wearing), University of Minnesota Press (1974) ISBN 0-8166-0717-6
- G. B. Shaw – An Annotated Bibliography of Writings about Him: 1871–1930 (ed. Wearing), Northern Illinois University Press (1986) ISBN 0-87580-125-0
- English Drama and Theatre, 1800–1900, with L.W. Conolly, Gale Research (1978)
- The London Stage, 1890–1899: A Calendar of Plays and Players, The Scarecrow Press (1976), ISBN 0-8108-0910-9
- The London Stage, 1900–1909: A Calendar of Plays and Players, The Scarecrow Press (1981) ISBN 0-8108-1403-X
- The London Stage, 1910–1919: A Calendar of Plays and Players, The Scarecrow Press (1982) ISBN 0-8108-1596-6
- The London Stage, 1920–1929: A Calendar of Plays and Players, The Scarecrow Press (1984) ISBN 0-8108-1715-2
- The London Stage, 1930–1939: A Calendar of Plays and Players, The Scarecrow Press (1990) ISBN 0-8108-2349-7
- The London Stage, 1940–1949: A Calendar of Plays and Players, The Scarecrow Press (1991) ISBN 0-8108-2500-7
- The London Stage, 1950–1959: A Calendar of Plays and Players, The Scarecrow Press (1993) ISBN 0-8108-2690-9
- The London Stage 1960–1980: A Calendar of Dramatic Productions, Performers, and Personnel (2023) (Online only)
- The London Stage 1890–1899: A Calendar of Productions, Performers, and Personnel, Rowman & Littlefield (2013) ISBN 0-8108-9281-2
- The London Stage 1900–1909: A Calendar of Productions, Performers, and Personnel, Rowman & Littlefield (2013) ISBN 0-8108-9293-6
- The London Stage 1910–1919: A Calendar of Productions, Performers, and Personnel, Rowman & Littlefield (2013) ISBN 0-8108-9299-5
- The London Stage 1920–1929: A Calendar of Productions, Performers, and Personnel, Rowman & Littlefield (2014) ISBN 0-8108-9301-0
- The London Stage 1930–1939: A Calendar of Productions, Performers, and Personnel, Rowman & Littlefield (2014) ISBN 0-8108-9303-7
- The London Stage 1940–1949: A Calendar of Productions, Performers, and Personnel, Rowman & Littlefield (2014) ISBN 0-8108-9305-3
- The London Stage 1950–1959: A Calendar of Productions, Performers, and Personnel, Rowman & Littlefield (2014) ISBN 0-8108-9307-X
- The London Stage 1890–1959: Accumulated Indexes, Rowman & Littlefield (2014) ISBN 0-8108-9301-0
- The Shakespeare Diaries: A Fictional Autobiography, Santa Monica Press (2007) ISBN 1-59580-022-0
