= Joseph Blake (criminal) =

English criminal (c. 1700–1724)

Joseph "Blueskin" Blake
- Born: baptised, 31 October 1700; Upper Thames Street, London, England
- Died: 11 November 1724 (age 24); Tyburn Tree Gallows, Middlesex, London, England
- Cause of death: Execution by hanging
- Resting place: St Andrew, Holborn, Middlesex, London, England
- Occupations: highwayman, murderer
- Known for: his vicious attack on London thief and "Thief-Taker General", Jonathan Wild

Joseph "Blueskin" Blake (baptised 31 October 1700 – 11 November 1724) was an 18th-century English highwayman and prison escapee.

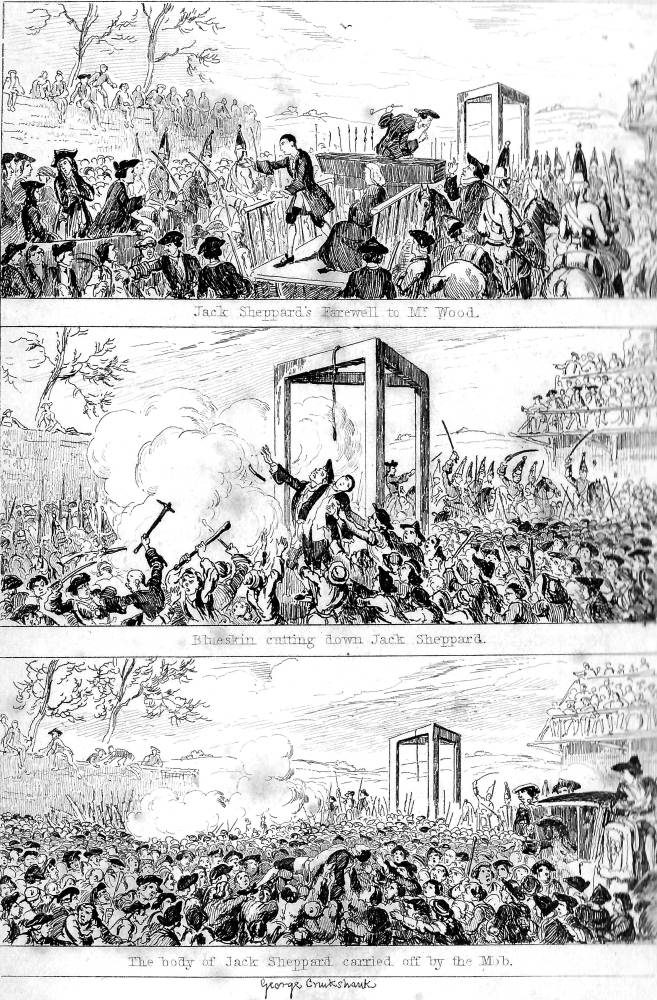
There are no contemporary pictures of Blake but he is featured in the second image of "The Last Scene" engraved by George Cruikshank in 1839 to illustrate William Harrison Ainsworth's serialised novel, Jack Sheppard. The caption reads: "Blueskin cutting down Jack Sheppard". In reality Blueskin had himself already been executed by the time of Sheppard's execution.

== Early life ==
Blake was the son of Nathaniel and Jane Blake. He was baptised at All-Hallows-the-Great in London. His parents had the means to send him to the parish school of St Giles-without-Cripplegate for about six years.

A school friend, William Blewitt, introduced him to the self-styled "Thief-Taker General" (and thief) Jonathan Wild around 1714. He left school and became a professional thief.

By the age of 17, he was earning his living as a pickpocket, working with Edward Pollitt (or Pawlett or Pollard), and had been nicknamed "Blueskin". The origin of his sobriquet is uncertain: it could be due to his swarthy complexion, but possibly also to excessive facial hair, a port-wine birthmark, or perhaps a punning reference to his friend Blewitt.

== Later life ==
By 1719, Blake was working with Irish highwayman James Carrick, and, by 1722, he was a member of a gang of street robbers led by Robert Wilkinson. Several of his colleagues were arrested that summer, and three were hanged in September. Blake escaped this time, perhaps due to influence deployed on his behalf by Wild, but he received a sabre cut to the head as he resisted his arrest by Wild in December 1722. He turned King's evidence against several former associates, including Blewitt. Three accomplices (John Levee, Richard Oakey and Matthew Flood) were hanged on the strength of Blake's testimony in February 1723. Blueskin expected to be released and to receive some of the reward money for securing the convictions, but he was confined in Wood Street Compter instead, under threat of deportation.

Eventually, Blake found sureties for his good behaviour, and was released in June 1724. He quickly joined forces with notorious thief and gaol-breaker Jack Sheppard. They burgled the house of William Kneebone (Sheppard's former apprentice master) on Sunday 12 July, stealing a quantity of cloth and some other trinkets, but this burglary was to prove their undoing. Having stored the goods near the horse ferry at Westminster, they approached one of Wild's fences, William Field, to sell the stolen goods. Word of the crime soon reached Wild, who was determined to punish Sheppard because he had refused to work for Wild. After a brief interlude as highwaymen on the Hampstead Road on Sunday 19 July and Monday 20 July, Sheppard was arrested at Blueskin's mother's brandy shop in Rosemary Lane (later renamed Royal Mint Street), east of the Tower of London, on 23 July by Wild's henchman, Quilt Arnold. He was detained in Newgate Prison pending trial, accused of the Kneebone robbery. Kneebone, Wild and Field gave evidence against Sheppard, and he was convicted of the burglary on 12 August.

== Arrest ==
Meanwhile, Wild took against Blake, his former underling, probably due to his recent association with Sheppard. Blake was arrested by Wild, Arnold and Abraham Mendez Ceixes at his lodgings in St Giles on Friday 2 October 1724. Blueskin was tried on Thursday 15 October, with Field and Wild again due to give evidence. Outside the courtroom, Blake tried to persuade Wild to put in a good word for him, but Wild refused. Blake attacked Wild, slashing his throat with a pocket-knife. Wild was quickly attended by passing surgeons, and taken away. Blake's attack caused an uproar which spread to the adjacent prison, and the disturbance continued into the evening. Sheppard, having escaped from Newgate on 4 September and been recaptured five days later, used the distraction inside the prison to cover his fourth, and most audacious, escape.

Despite the altercation outside the court, Blake's trial went ahead in Wild's absence. Field's evidence was enough to ensure that Blake was convicted, although his account was not consistent with the evidence that he gave at Sheppard's trial. Blake was sentenced to be hanged, but showed no remorse for his crimes. He tried to escape from Newgate without success.

Sheppard was recaptured for a final time on 1 November. On Wednesday 11 November 1724, the day after Sheppard's death sentence was confirmed, Blake was drawn to Tyburn along the traditional route, stopping at the Griffin tavern on Holborn for a stiff drink. In his drunkenness, he slurred his speech from the scaffold before he was hanged. His body was laid out for a few days, and he was buried in the churchyard at St Andrew, Holborn. Sheppard was hanged five days after Blake, on Monday 16 November.

== Legacy ==
Blake is best remembered for his vicious attack on Wild. Wild was lucky to survive, protected by the stock worn about his neck. He was incapacitated for weeks, and his grip over his criminal empire started to slip while he recuperated. He quickly lost the confidence of his "customers" and the grudging respect of the general populace, and he was himself convicted and hanged in 1725.

Blake was overshadowed by Sheppard's fame. His attack on Wild inspired John Gay's ballad "Newgate's Garland", also called "Blueskin's Ballad", which appears in John Thurmond's play, Harlequin Sheppard. Blake appears in many accounts of Sheppard's life, although the characterisation often bears little resemblance to the reality.
