= Chrissie Glazebrook =

British writer

- Born: 19 March 1945
- Died: 7 December 2007 (aged 62); Scarborough, England
- Occupations: Arts administrator, writer, secretary, journalist, broadcaster
- Writing career
- Notable awards: The Waterstones Prize for Prose; 1998; Time to Write Award; 2002
- Website: Shuffling Off

Chrissie Glazebrook, adopted as Christine Ann Wright (19 March 1945 – 7 December 2007) was a British writer, known for her novel The Madolescents (2001).

== Early life and marriage ==
Glazebrook was adopted at 8 weeks by Mary and Ernest Wright and brought up in the Black Country. She was educated at Cannock Grammar School and then did a secretarial course. She married in the late 1960s and moved to Scarborough. She was divorced a few years later.

== Career ==
Before her writing career, Glazebrook had a number of jobs, including in a zoo and managing a vegetarian restaurant. She also worked at the Stephen Joseph Theatre. From 1982 to 1990 she worked as a freelance writer and broadcaster. She wrote for the magazine Jackie. She produced Flavour of the Month, a cookery programme, for Tyne Tees Television, and also worked as a television presenter for Tyne Tees.

In 1991 Glazebrook became an Arts Administrator at Northern Arts. She was one of the founders of ProudWORDS, a gay and lesbian literature festival. In 1998 Glazebrook completed an MA in creative writing at Northumbria University.

Her first novel, The Madolescents, was published in 2001. Ray French said of the teenage narrator that "Rowena's cynical, fragile, vulgar voice is a delight".

Glazebrook was part of a network of Northern writers, particularly women, including Julia Darling.

== Illness and death ==
Glazebrook had depression.

In 2006 she was diagnosed with liver and bowel cancer. She died the following year in Scarborough, supported by her family.

== Selected works ==
Glazebrook's publications include:

- The Pocket Guide to Men (1986)
- "The Full Monty", in Biting Back : new fiction from the North, (ed) Kitty Fitzgerald (IRON, 2001)
- The Madolescents (Heinemann/Arrow, 2002)
- Blue Spark Sisters (Heinemann/Arrow, 2003)
