= Jack Sheppard (novel) =

Novel by William Harrison Ainsworth

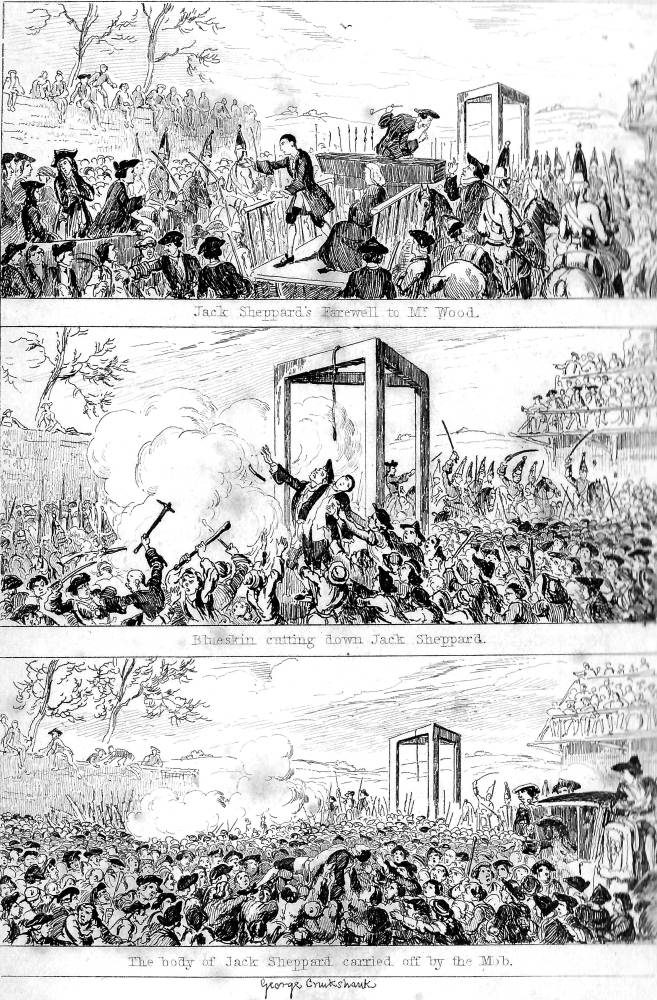
"The Last Scene", engraved by George Cruikshank in 1839 to illustrate William Harrison Ainsworth's serialised novel, Jack Sheppard. The caption reads: "Blueskin cutting down Jack Sheppard". In reality Blueskin was already dead by the time of Sheppard's execution.

Jack Sheppard is a novel by William Harrison Ainsworth serially published in Bentley's Miscellany from 1839 to 1840, with illustrations by George Cruikshank. It is a historical romance and a Newgate novel based on the real life of the 18th-century criminal Jack Sheppard.

== Background ==
Jack Sheppard was serially published in Bentley's Miscellany from January 1839 until February 1840. The novel was intertwined with the history of Charles Dickens's Oliver Twist, which ran in the same publication from February 1837 to April 1839. Dickens, previously a friend of Ainsworth's, became distant from Ainsworth as a controversy brewed over the scandalous nature around Jack Sheppard, Oliver Twist, and other novels describing criminal life. The relationship dissolved between the two, and Dickens retired from the magazine as its editor and made way for Ainsworth to replace him as editor at the end of 1839.

A three volume edition of the work was published by Bentley in October 1839. The novel was adapted to the stage, and eight different theatrical versions were produced in autumn 1839.

== Plot summary ==
The story is divided into three parts called "epochs". The "Jonathan Wild" epoch comes first. The events of the story begin with the notorious criminal and thief-catcher Jonathan Wild encouraging Jack Sheppard's father to a life of crime. Wild once pursues Sheppard's mother, and eventually turns Sheppard's father over to the authorities, and he is soon after executed. Sheppard's mother is left alone to raise Sheppard, a mere infant at the time.

Paralleling these events is the story of Thames Darrell. On 26 November 1703, the date of the first section, Darrell is removed from his immoral uncle Sir Rowland Trenchard, and is given to Mr. Wood to be raised. The second epoch traces the adolescence of both Darrell and Sheppard, who are both living with Mr. Wood.

The third epoch takes place in 1724 and spans six months. Sheppard is a thief who spends his time robbing various people. He and Blueskin rob the Wood's household, when Blueskin murders Mrs. Woods. This upsets Sheppard and results in his separation from Wild's group. Sheppard befriends Thames again and spends his time trying to correct Blueskin's wrong. Sheppard is captured by Jonathan Wild multiple times, but continues to ingeniously escape from his prisons. After his mother's death, Sheppard is captured by Wild at Mrs. Sheppard's gravesite, where he is taken to Newgate prison for the last time. He is executed by hanging, with thousands of Londoners turning out to watch his death.

=== Characters ===
- Jack Sheppard
- Jonathan Wild
- Thames Darrell
- Mr. Wood
- Mrs. Wood
- Winifred Wood
- Blueskin – Joseph Blake
- Thomas Sheppard
- Mrs. Sheppard

== Themes ==
Ainsworth's two novels Rookwood and Jack Sheppard were fundamental in popularising the "Newgate novel" tradition, a combination of criminal biography, the historical and Gothic novel traditions. The tradition itself stems from a Renaissance literary tradition of emphasising the actions of well-known criminals. Ainsworth's Jack Sheppard is connected to another work within the same tradition that ran alongside it for many months in the Bentley's Miscellany: Dickens' Oliver Twist. The plots are similar, in that both deal with an individual attempting to corrupt a boy. Ainsworth's boy is corrupted, whereas Dickens' is not. Both authors also cast Jews as their villains; they are similar in appearance, though Ainsworth's is less powerful.

According to Frank Chandler, the novel "was intended as a study in the Spanish style". Such influences appear in Jack's physical description and in the words of the characters. Dramatist John Gay stated that Jack's story is related to the stories of Guzman d'Alfarache, Lazarillo de Tormes, Estevanillo Gonzalez, Meriton Latroon, and other Spanish rogues. However, there are differences between him and the Spanish characters. His personality is different, especially as he is alternately described as malicious and heroic. He is less sympathetic than his Spanish counterparts until Wild is introduced into the work, whereupon he is seen more favourably. The feud between Wild and Sheppard results in Sheppard giving up his roguish ways. When Sheppard is executed, his character has gained the status of a martyr.

The novel depicts Wild as vicious and cruel, a character who wants to control the London underworld and to destroy Sheppard. Wild is not focused on the novel's main character, but finds an enemy in anyone who is no longer useful to him. This is particularly true of Sir Rowland Trenchard, whom Wild murders in a horrific manner. In addition to these actions, Wild is said to have kept a trophy case of items representing cruelty, including the skull of Sheppard's father. In his depictions of Wild's cruel nature and his grotesque murders, Ainsworth went further than his contemporaries would in their novels. As counter to Wild, no matter how depraved Sheppard acts, he is still good. He suffers anguish as a result of his actions, continuing until the very moment of his death at Tyburn. This is not to suggest that his character is free from problems, but that he is depicted only as a thief and not a worse type of criminal.

Morality and moral lessons do play a part within Jack Sheppard. For instance, the second epoch begins with a reflection on the passing of twelve years and how people changed over that length of time. In particular, the narrator asks, "Where are the dreams of ambition in which, twelve years ago, we indulged? Where are the aspirations that fired us—the passions that consumed us then? Has our success in life been commensurate with our own desires—with the anticipations formed of us by others? Or, are we not blighted in heart, as in ambition? Has not the loved one been estranged by doubt, or snatched from us by the cold hand of death? Is not the goal, towards which we pressed, farther off than ever,—the prospect before us cheerless as the blank behind?"

== Sources ==
Jack Sheppard was a well-known criminal in 18th-century London. Writers such as Daniel Defoe included references to Jack Sheppard in their works in the Newgate tradition. Other figures appear within the work because of their connection to the Newgate tradition, including William Hogarth. Hogarth is particularly involved because of his "Industry and Idleness" (1747), a series of illustrations that depict the London underworld. Sheppard's rival Jonathan Wild was also a real criminal, and the character is based on the same character that was used in fiction during the 18th century, including Henry Fielding's The Life and Death of Jonathan Wild, the Great. Like Hogarth's prints, the novel pairs the descent into crime of the "idle" apprentice with the rise of typical melodramatic character Thomas Darrell, a foundling of aristocratic birth who defeats his evil uncle to recover his fortune. Cruikshank's images perfectly complemented Ainsworth's tale—Thackeray wrote that "Mr Cruickshank really created the tale, and that Mr Ainsworth, as it were, only put words to it."

Ainsworth did not have any direct knowledge or experience of his subject matter or the criminal underworld. He admitted in 1878 that he "never had anything to do with scoundrels in my life. I got my slang in a much easier way. I picked up the Memoirs of one James Hardy Vaux a returned transport. The book was full of adventures, and had at the end a kind of slang dictionary. Out of this I got all of my 'patter'."

== Response ==
With its publication, Ainsworth told James Crossley in an 8 October 1839 letter, "The success of Jack is pretty certain, they are bringing him out at half the theatres in London." He was correct; Jack Sheppard was a popular success and sold more books than Ainsworth's previous novels Rookwood and Crichton. It was published in book form in 1839, before the serialised version was completed, and even outsold early editions of Oliver Twist. Ainsworth's novel was adapted into a successful play by John Buckstone in October 1839 at the Adelphi Theatre starring Mary Anne Keeley. It has been described as the "exemplary climax" of "the pictorial novel dramatized pictorially". (It seems likely that Cruikshank's illustrations were deliberately created in a form that would be easy to repeat as tableaux on stage.) The novel was also adapted as popular burlesque Little Jack Sheppard in 1885. For an overview of the literary response, see Ellis 1933.

The story generated a form of cultural mania, embellished by pamphlets, prints, cartoons, plays, and souvenirs, not repeated until George du Maurier's Trilby in 1895. It spawned many imitations and parodies of the novel, but it also "aroused a very different response," according to George Worth, "a vigorous outcry concerning its alleged glorification of crime and immorality and the baneful effect which it was bound to have on the young and impressionable." One such outcry came from Mary Russell Mitford who claimed after the novel's publication that "all the Chartists in the land are less dangerous than this nightmare of a book". Public alarm at the possibility that young people would emulate Sheppard's behaviour led the Lord Chamberlain to ban, at least in London, the licensing of any plays with "Jack Sheppard" in the title for forty years. A report claimed that Courvousier, the valet of Lord William Russell, said that the book had inspired him to murder his master.

In the 1841 Chronicles of Crime, Camden Pelham claimed in regards to influence of Jack Sheppard: "The rage for housebreakers has become immense, and the fortunes of the most notorious and the most successful of thieves have been made the subject of entertainments at no fewer than six of the London theatres." The negative response against Jack Sheppard heightened when the novel was blamed for inspiring the murder of William Russell.

During the outcry, Jack Sheppard was able to become more popular than Dickens's Oliver Twist. This may have prompted Dickens's friend John Forster to review the work harshly in the Examiner following its publication. Also, Dickens wanted to separate himself from Ainsworth and Ainsworth's writing, especially that found in the Newgate tradition. In a February 1840 letter to Richard Hengist Horne, he wrote:

I am by some jolter-headed enemies most unjustly and untruly charged with having written a book after Mr. Ainsworth's fashion. Unto these jolter-heads and their intensely concentrated humbug, I shall take an early opportunity of temperately replying. If this opportunity had presented itself and I had made this vindication, I could have no objection to set my hand to what I know to be true concerning the late lamented John Sheppard, but I feel a great repugnance to do so now, lest it should seem an ungenerous and unmanly way of disavowing any sympathy with that school, and a means of shielding myself.

In 1844, Horne wrote that Jack Sheppard "was full of unredeemed crimes, but being told without any offensive language, did its evil work of popularity, and has now gone to its cradle in the cross-roads of literature, and should be henceforth hushed up by all who have—as so many have—a personal regard for its author."

There were many negative responses from other literary figures, including Edgar Allan Poe who wrote in a March 1841 review, "Such libels on humanity, such provocations to crime, such worthless, inane, disgraceful romances as 'Jack Sheppard' and its successors, are a blot on our literature and a curse to our land." Also, William Makepeace Thackeray was a harsh critic of the Newgate novel tradition and expressed his views through parodying aspects of Jack Sheppard in his novel Catherine. Other influences of the novel appear in Bon Gaultier Ballads, especially when they state:

Turpin, thou should'st be living at this hour: England hath need of thee. Great men have been among us—names that lend A lustre to our calling—better none: Maclaine, Duval, Dick Turpin, Barrington, Blueskin and others who called Sheppard friend.

Charles Mackay re-evaluated the 1841 negative response of the novel in 1851, and determined that the novel did negatively affect people: "Since the publication of the first edition of this volume, Jack Sheppard's adventures have been revived. A novel upon the real or fabulous history of the burglar has afforded, by its extraordinary popularity, a further exemplification of the allegations in the text." In particular, Mackay declares, "The Inspector's Report on Juvenile Delinquency at Liverpool contains much matter of the same kind; but sufficient has been already quoted to shew the injurious effects of the deification of great thieves by thoughtless novelists." Stephen Carver mentioned in 2003 that "it was the theatrical adaptations consumed by the new urban working class that were considered the social problem [...] What is apparent again and again, as one reconstructs the critical annihilation of Ainsworth, is that the bourgeois establishment neither forgave nor forgot." Furthermore, Carver argues, "The Newgate controversy invades the textual surface like a virus. After this, the critic has carte blanche to say anything, however vicious, ill-informed or downright libellous."

At the turn of the 20th century, Chandler pointed out that the "forces of literature rose in revolt" against the novel. Later, Keith Hollingsworth declared Ainsworth's novel as "the high point of the Newgate novel as entertainment". Carver argues, "Had he not abandoned the form that he had effectively originated but rather moderated the moral message to suit the times as Dickens had done, Ainsworth would have likely remained at the cutting edge of Victorian literature for a little while longer."
