= Coppetts Wood and Scrublands =

Nature reserve in the London Borough of Barnet

Coordinates: 51.6087°N 0.1574°W

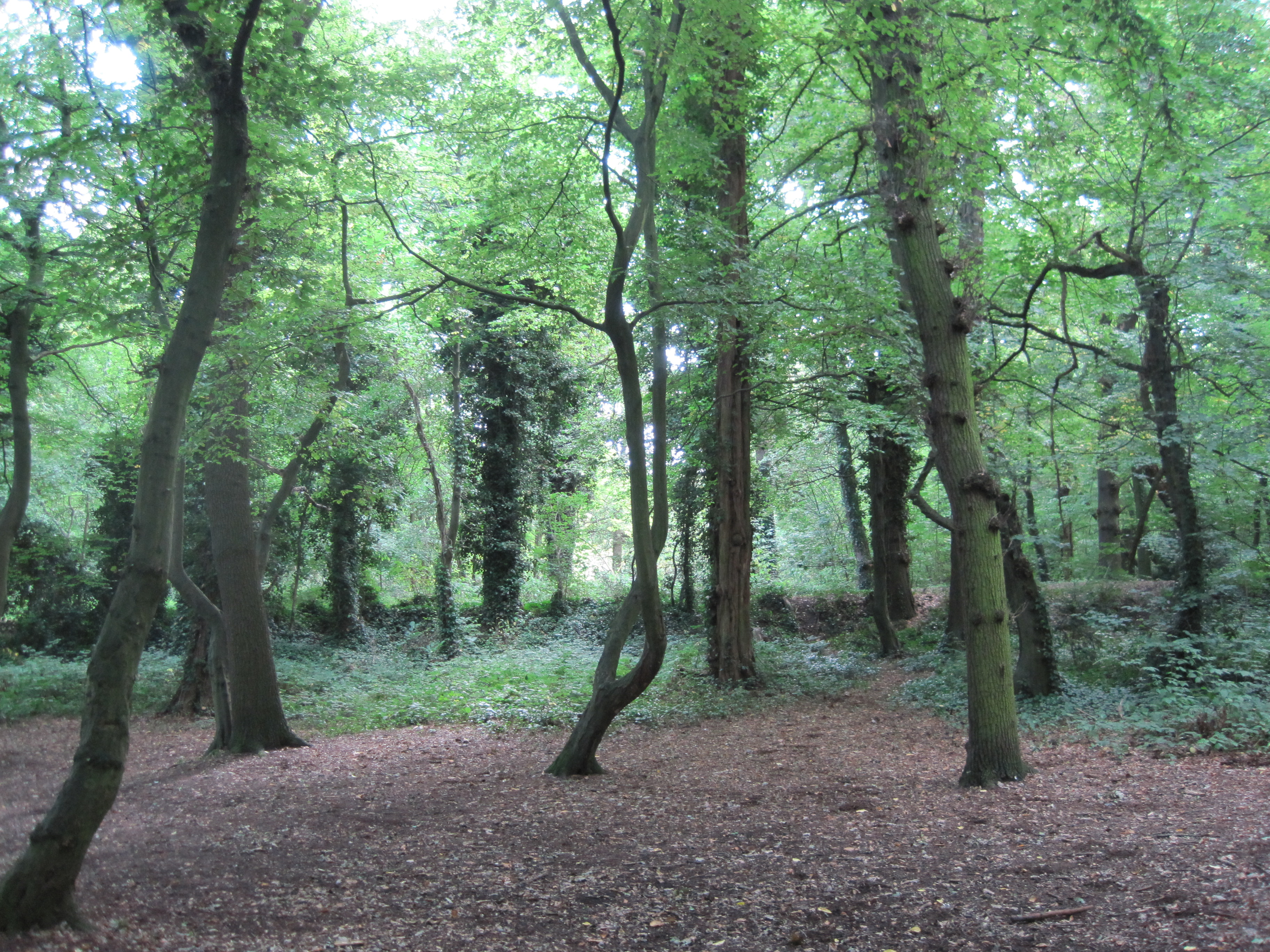
Coppetts Wood

Coppetts Wood and Scrublands is a 14.5-hectare (36-acre) Site of Borough Importance for Nature Conservation, Grade I, between Muswell Hill and Friern Barnet in the London Borough of Barnet. It is part of the Coppetts Wood and Glebelands Local Nature Reserve.

The main trees are oak and hornbeam, and ground flora include bluebell and garlic mustard. Breeding birds include woodpeckers, tawny owls and sparrowhawks. A small pond has a clump of yellow iris, and common frogs and smooth newts. Scrublands has a variety of habitats and some rare plants such as imperforate St John's-wort. There are several rare species of insects.

Coppetts Wood was once part of a forest known as Finchley Wood. By the sixteenth century it had shrunk in size and became known as a common, and in the seventeenth and eighteenth centuries it was used for pursuits such as bare-knuckle boxing, horse racing and pigeon shooting. It also had a reputation as a haunt of highwaymen. In the nineteenth century a sewage works was built on the site. It was closed in 1963, but still has its legacy in the rich variety of plants in the Scrublands. In the Second World War it was used for military training, and several tank traps still remain.

Access to the site is from Colney Hatch Lane and the North Circular Road.

The Coppetts Wood Conservationists meet on Sunday mornings throughout the year with the aim of maintaining the nature reserve, increasing its biodiversity and enjoying some sociable exercise.

Coppetts is also a ward of the London Borough of Barnet. At 2011 Census the ward population was 17,250.

== Gallery ==
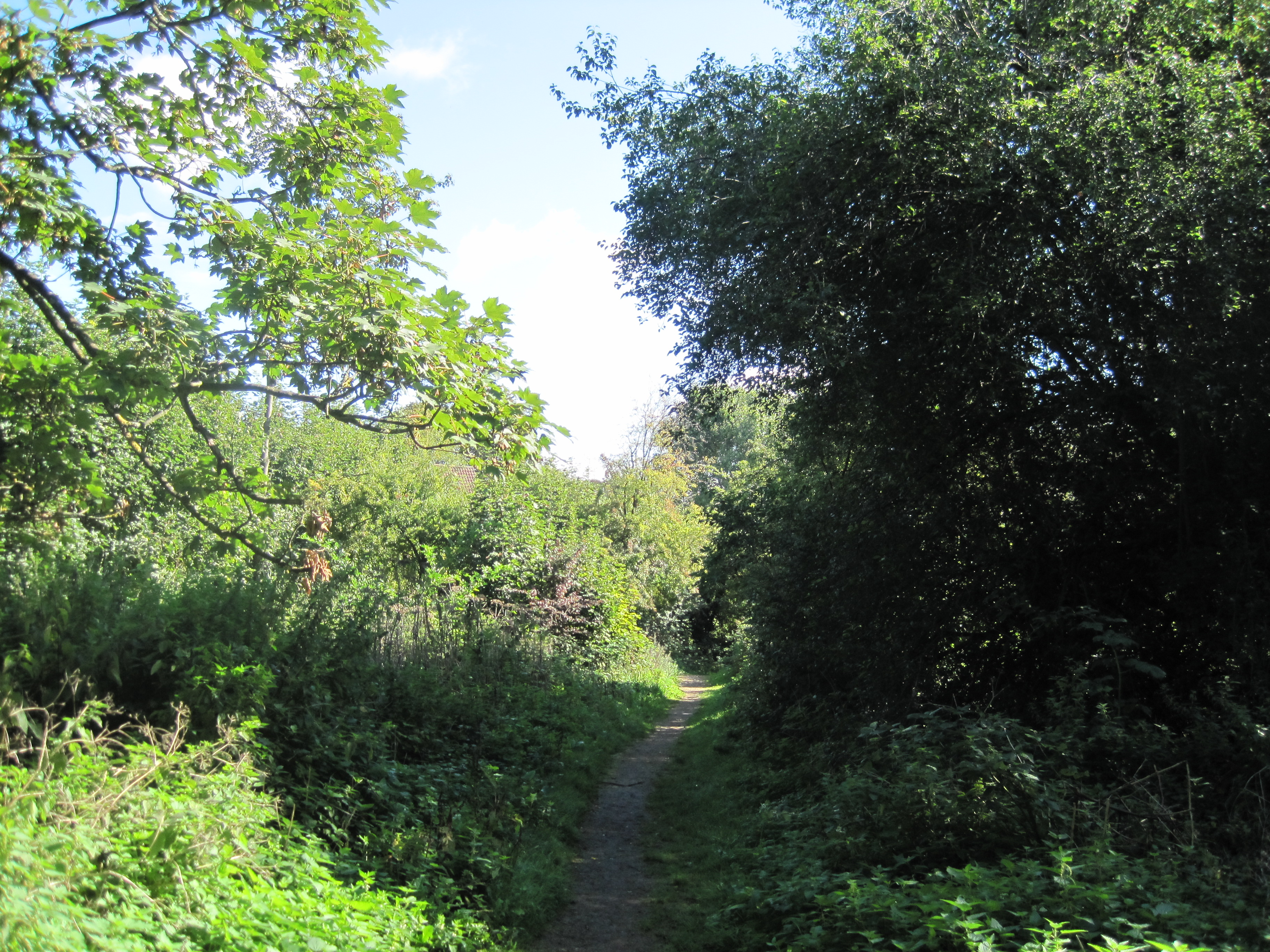
Coppetts Wood path

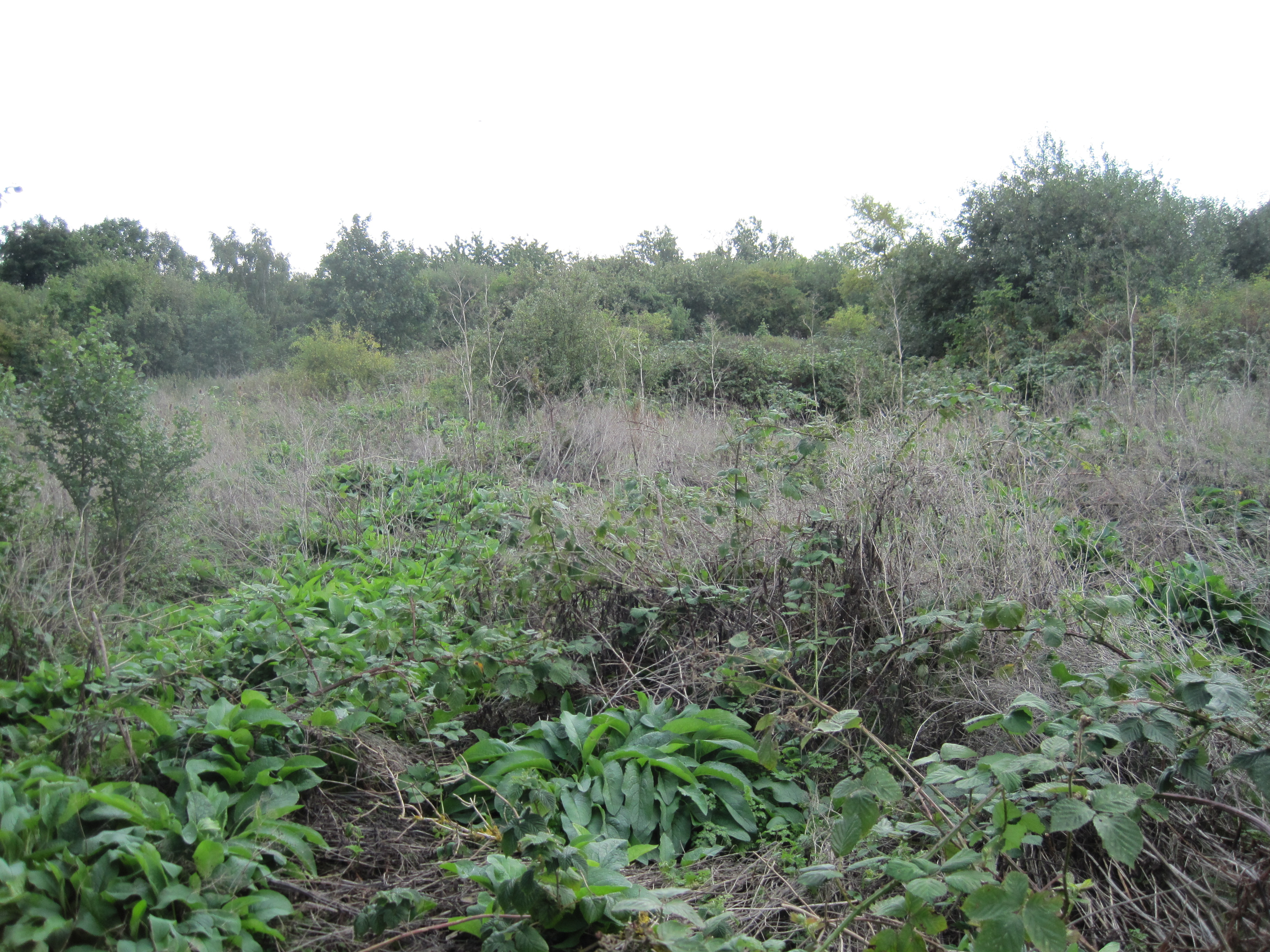
Scrublands

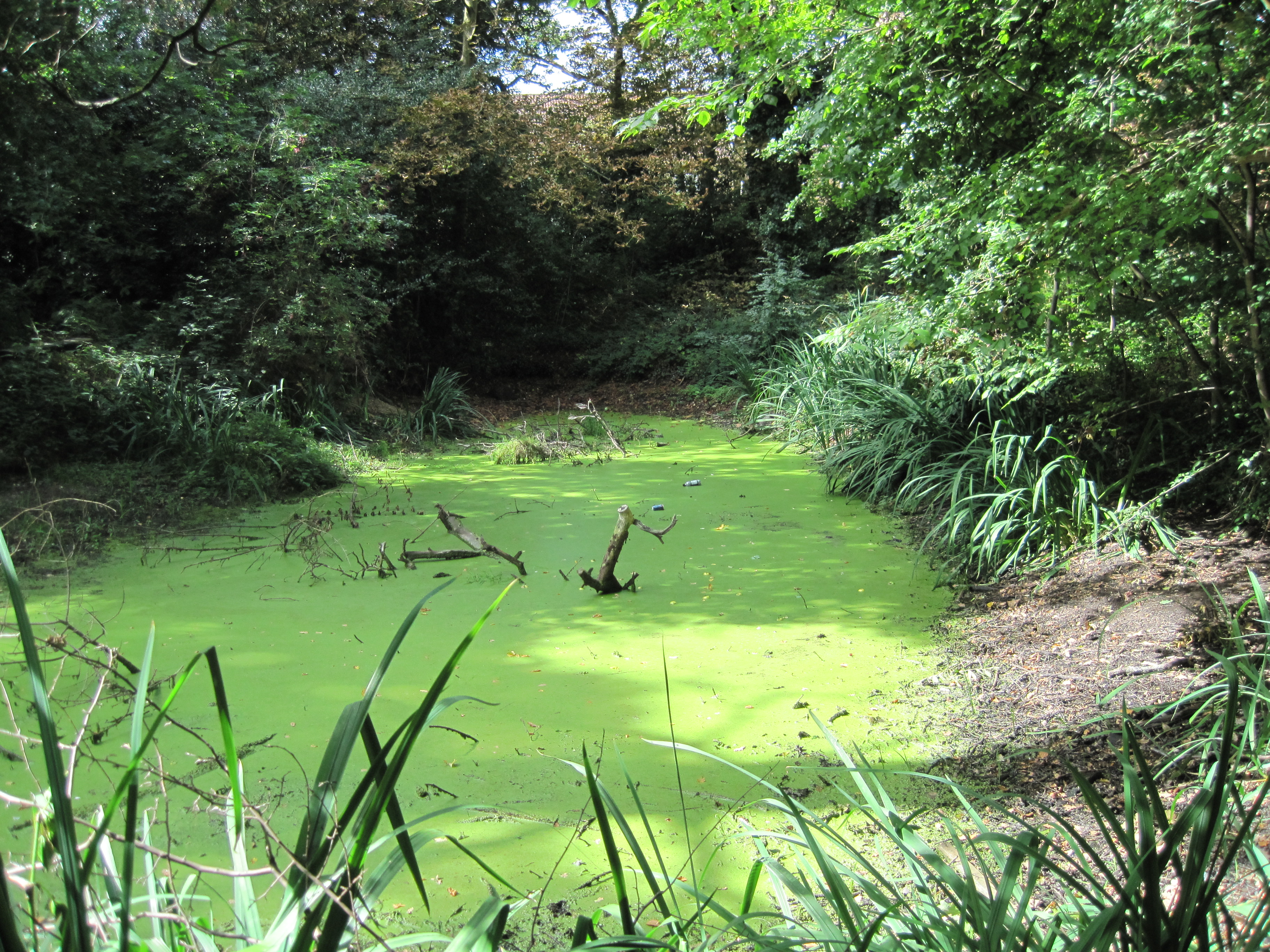
Pond at Coppetts Wood

== See also ==
- Coldfall Wood
- Barnet parks and open spaces
- Nature reserves in Barnet
