= Jackie (magazine) =

UK magazine for girls

- The cover of Jackie #1 (11 January 1964), offering a free "twin heart ring"
- Editor: Gordon Small; Nina Myskow
- Frequency: Weekly
- Publisher: D. C. Thomson & Co. Ltd
- Total circulation: 605,947 (1976)
- First issue: 11 January 1964
- Final issue: 3 July 1993
- Country: United Kingdom
- Based in: London, England
- Language: English
- ISSN: 0262-0286

Jackie was a weekly British magazine for girls. The magazine was published by D. C. Thomson & Co. Ltd of Dundee from 11 January 1964 until its closure on 3 July 1993 – a total of 1,538 issues. Jackie was the best-selling teen magazine in Britain for ten years, particularly in the decade of the 1970s.

== Publication history ==
The title was chosen from a list of girls' names, although it was nearly dropped due to the association with Jackie Kennedy following her husband's assassination in 1963. An urban legend exists that it was named after Jacqueline Wilson, who worked there before she became a notable children's author. Although the author has attempted to perpetuate this claim, this has been denied by those who were involved in the launch.

Jackie was the best-selling teen magazine in Britain for ten years, with sales rising from an initial 350,000 to 605,947 in 1976. The best-ever selling single issue was the 1972 special edition to coincide with the UK tour of American singer David Cassidy.

Jackie absorbed Diana (which had been characterized as DC Thomson's answer to IPC's Girl) in 1976.

Sales declined after the 1970s, and by 1993 circulation had dropped to 50,000 weekly. Deciding not to follow the more sexual and high-fashion orientation of newer teenage magazines, DC Thomson chose to shut the magazine down. It was one of several Thomson papers to close that year.

More recently, the company has started issuing a historic Jackie annual.

== Content ==
During the 1970s, Jackie published a mix of fashion and beauty tips, gossip, short stories, and comic strips (including The Andy Fairweather Low Story). The latter were usually illustrated with line drawings or posed photographs, especially if the story involved a "reader's true-life experience." Both the comics and the short stories invariably dealt with either romance or family issues. (By the 1980s, the magazine no longer featured comics of any kind.)

The centre pages of the magazine usually contained a pull-out poster of a popular band or film star. The magazine featured a section called Silly Star File, a humorous interview with figures from the world of pop music.

Jackie became very popular with young teenage girls, not least because of the Cathy and Claire problem page, which received 400 reader letters a week and dealt with controversial issues that were nonetheless relevant to the readership. However, the subjects covered in the column were not reflective of the majority of readers' letters, which focused on sex-related issues – DC Thomson, as a result, kept the editorial brief, but created a series of help leaflets which they sent to letter writers. In 1974 the NHS made the contraceptive pill free on prescription, and so under editor Nina Myskow the magazine introduced a Dear Doctor column, which covered what were termed as "below the waist issues".

== Contributors ==
Ex-RAF engine fitter Gordon Small was the first editor. TV critic Nina Myskow was its first female editor. In the 1970s, Rhonda Wilson was the magazine's music editor, stylist, photographer and agony aunt.

=== Notable writers ===
- Chrissie Glazebrook, novelist

=== Notable models ===
Models and feature story characters in Jackie included:

- Shirley Manson – singer of band Garbage, actress
- Fiona Bruce – BBC newsreader
- Leslie Ash – actress
- Hugh Grant – actor

== Legacy ==
BBC Radio invited Jackie Clune to do an epitaph for Jackie and, in 2007, the BBC produced an hour-long programme devoted to the magazine's 1970s heyday, called Jackie Magazine: A Girl's Best Friend, with contributions from former readers, writers, staff and publishers.

The magazine inspired a musical.

== See also ==
- British girls' comics
