= Cannock Chase High School =

Location
- Hednesford Road; Cannock, Staffordshire, WS11 1JT; England; 52°41′40″N 2°01′26″W

Information
- Type: Academy
- Local authority: Staffordshire
- Specialist: Science
- Department for Education URN: 137384 Tables
- Ofsted: Reports
- Headteacher: Iain Turnbull
- Gender: Mixed
- Age: 11 to 18
- Enrolment: 871
- Capacity: 2,187
- Former name: Cannock Grammar School
- Website: http://www.cannockchasehigh.com

Cannock Chase High School is a secondary school with academy status in Cannock, Staffordshire. The school is situated just north of the town centre, towards Blackfords, east of Cannock Chase Hospital.

== History ==
=== Grammar school ===
Cannock Grammar School opened in September 1955 as a coeducational grammar school. The sixth form opened in September 1959. By 1962 it had 650 boys and girls. Next door was Calving Hill Secondary Modern School.

=== Comprehensive ===
The school changed its name to Chenet Comprehensive in 1976, when it switched from a Grammar to a Comprehensive system. In 1986 Chenet Comprehensive school merged with neighbouring Sherbrook School, on Hednesford Road. The school became Cannock Chase High School.

The school has recently been re-awarded specialist science school status, specialising in both science and mathematics.

In 2011 it converted to Academy Status. As of now, it can no longer be deemed as a 'Science specialist' school.

== Academic performance ==
In 2016 the school was inspected by Ofsted and judged to Require Improvement. In 2018 it was inspected again and judged Good; as of 2020 this is the most recent inspection.

In 2019 the school's Progress 8 measure at GCSE was average. The proportion of children entered for the English Baccalaureate was 5%, compared to 34% for the local authority and 40% in England. The proportion of children achieving Grade 5 or above in English and maths GCSEs was 33%, compared to 37% for the local authority and 43% for England. Performance at A level in 2019 was average.

== Notable faculty ==
- Philip Sugden (historian)
- Jane Swinnerton, professional field hockey player

== Notable former pupils ==
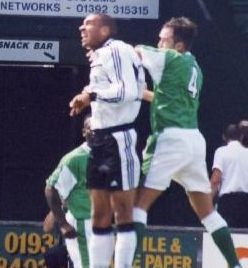
Stan Collymore in 2008

- Ritch Battersby, drummer in The Wildhearts
- Stanley Victor Collymore, former footballer and pundit for Talksport
- Steve Edge, comedian and actor
- Gerald Gary "Jed" Mercurio OBE, television writer, producer, director and novelist.

=== Cannock Grammar School ===
- Chrissie Glazebrook, author
- J. P. Wearing, author, former Head Boy
