= Julia Darling =

English novelist, poet and dramatist

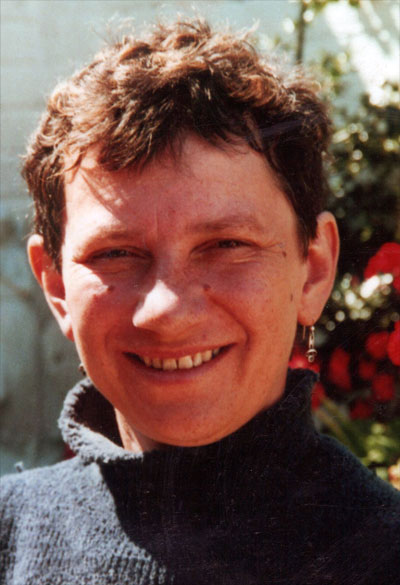
- Born: 21 August 1956; Winchester, Hampshire, England
- Died: 13 April 2005 (aged 48); Newcastle upon Tyne, England
- Occupations: Playwright, Novelist, Poet, Short story writer
- Writing career
- Period: 1976–2005
- Genre: Fiction
- Website: juliadarling.co.uk

Julia Rose Darling (21 August 1956 – 13 April 2005) was an English novelist, poet and dramatist.

== Early life and education ==
Darling was born in 1956 at 8 College Street, Winchester—the house Jane Austen died in. Her parents were John Ramsay Darling, a science teacher at Winchester College and Patricia Rosemary, who was a nurse and a Quaker. Darling later wrote about how the house's Austen connection meant they were constantly visited. She later wrote that as a teenager, she had put up anti-apartheid and pro-choice posters in her bedroom windows earning her a complaint from the Jane Austen Society.

Darling attended Winchester High School for Girls and St Christopher School. One of her friends at that time musician Robyn Hitchcock, described in her obituary as "groovy and alternative". She was expelled at 15 and attended Falmouth School of Art.

== Writing career ==
Darling moved to Newcastle in 1980 and began her writing career as a poet, publishing a collection entitled Small Beauties in 1988 and working with a performance group called "The Poetry Virgins".

In 1995 she published a book of short stories, Bloodlines with Panurge Press, and many of these stories were broadcast on BBC Radio 4. In 1998 her first novel, Crocodile Soup, was published by Anchor at Transworld. The novel went on to be published in Canada, Australia, Europe and the United States and was long-listed for the Orange Prize. Her second novel, The Taxi Driver's Daughter, was published by Penguin and long-listed for the Man Booker Prize and short-listed for the Encore Award. She wrote many plays for stage and radio.

In 2003, Darling's first full-length collection of poems, Sudden Collapses in Public Places, was published by Arc and was awarded a Poetry Book Society Recommendation. She worked on a number of arts and health projects, including work with elderly people in residential homes for Equal Arts, and she ran drama workshops for doctors and patients with the project "Operating Theatre". She was a fellow of Literature and Health in the English School at Newcastle University and was a recipient of the prestigious Northern Rock Foundation Writer's Award, the largest annual literary award in England.

She was part of a writing group with Chrissie Glazebrook.

== Personal life and death ==
On 13 October 1984 Darling married Ivan Paul Sears, a trade union organiser who later changed his name to Ieuan Einion. They had two daughters. In 1990, they divorced and Darling began living with Beverley Anne Robinson. She was heavily involved in starting Proud Words, the first English lesbian and gay literary festival.

Darling died of breast cancer in 2005 aged 48.

== Works ==
=== Plays ===
- Eating the Elephant and Other Plays (New Writing North, 2005), ISBN 978-0954145644.

=== Novels ===
- Crocodile Soup (Anchor Books, 1998), ISBN 978-1862300514
- The Taxi Driver's Daughter (Viking, 2003), ISBN 978-0670914197; Penguin, ISBN 978-0141012612.

=== Poetry ===
- Sudden Collapses in Public Places (Arc Publications, 2003), ISBN 978-1900072915.
- The Poetry Cure (Bloodaxe Books Ltd, 2005), ISBN 978-1852246907.
- Apology for Absence (Arc Publications, 2005), ISBN 978-1904614128.

=== Short stories ===
- Bloodlines (Panurge Publishing, 1995), ISBN 978-1898984252.
- Pearl and other stories (MayFly Press, 2018), ISBN 978-1911356127.
