= Glebelands Local Nature Reserve =

Nature reserve in the London Borough of Barnet

Coordinates: 51.604°N 0.169°W

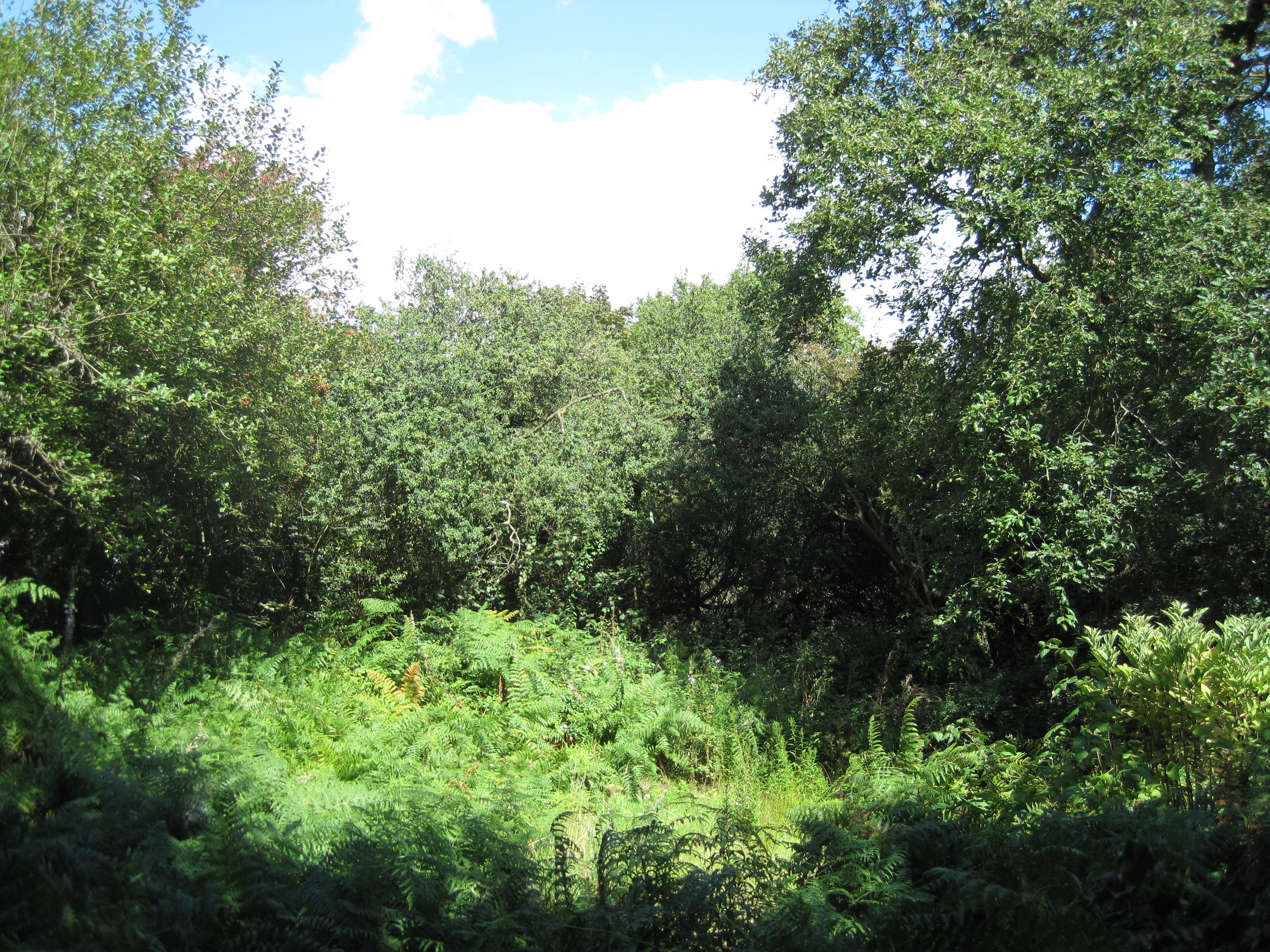
Glebelands

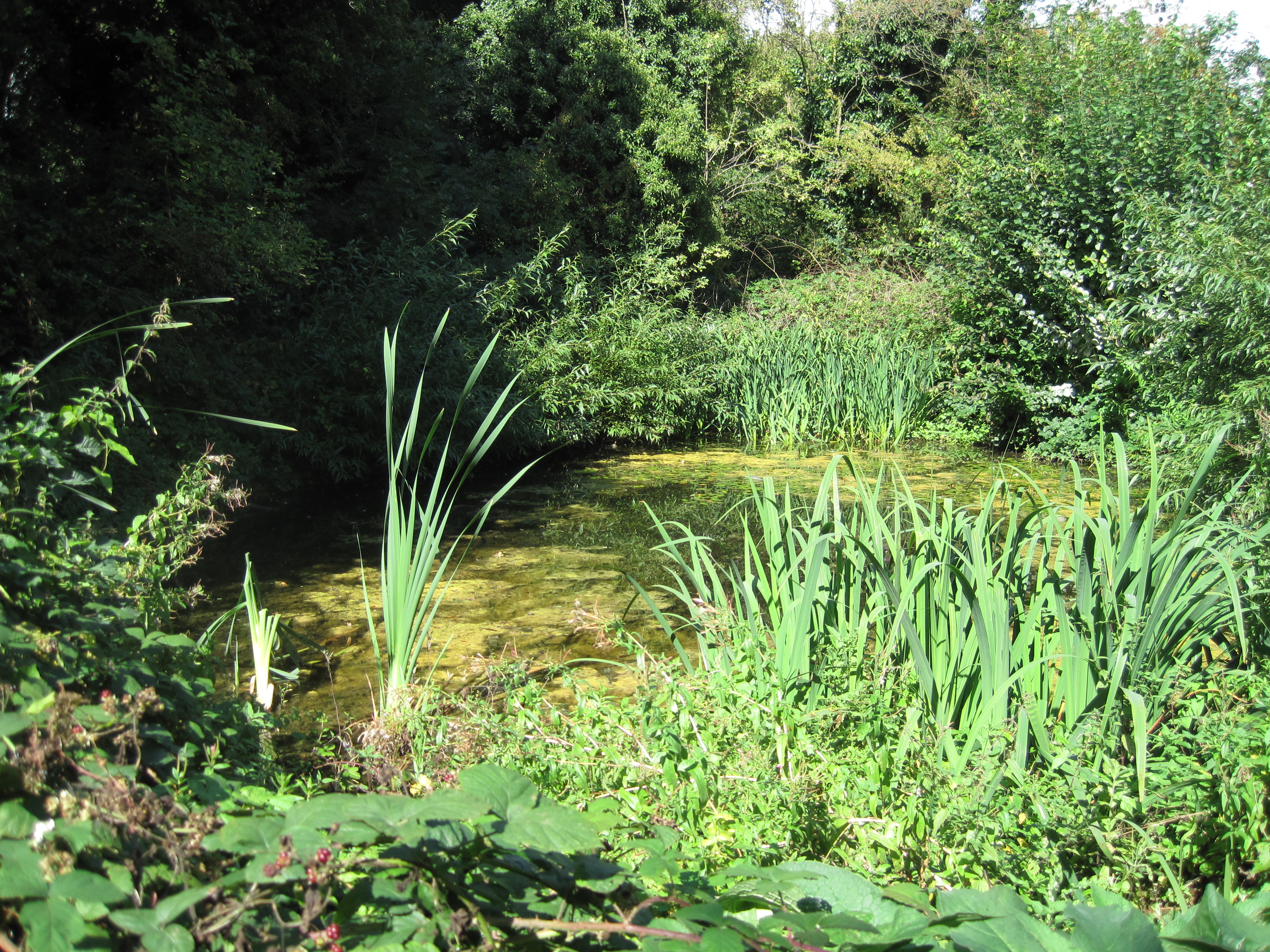
Pond at Glebelands

Glebelands is a Grade I Site of Borough Importance for Nature Conservation in Colney Hatch in the London Borough of Barnet. It is also part of the Coppett's Wood and Glebelands Local Nature Reserve.

It is the largest surviving fragment of the habitat of the old Finchley Common. The site is mostly wooded with areas of tall scrub and grassland, and there are numerous streams and seasonal small ponds. The main trees are hawthorn, oak, ash and silver birch. The wetlands have a number of very rare flora, and it is the only known London site for lesser water plantain. There is a good diversity of breeding birds.

Glebelands is located at the corner of the North Circular Road and High Road, with access from a path between the High Road and Legion Way, off Summers Lane.

== See also ==
- Nature reserves in Barnet
