= Nina Myskow =

British journalist and television personality

Nina Myskow (born Janina Marcela Myskow) is a British journalist and television personality who was a columnist for The Sun and the News of the World, under the byline "The Bitch on the Box", in the 1980s. She appeared on New Faces, and has been a regular contributor on Grumpy Old Women and on many countdown list shows.

== Early life ==
Myskow was born in St Andrews in Fife, Scotland, to a Polish officer father and a Scottish school teacher mother. Her parents moved to South Africa after World War II and she attended Wykeham Collegiate School in Pietermaritzburg, where she learned to speak Afrikaans. She moved back to Scotland with her family at the age of 15 attending Bell Baxter High School in Cupar. She studied English literature at the University of St Andrews, but did not graduate.

== Career ==
Myskow was a writer for Jackie for some years and then became the first female editor of the magazine. She appeared as a panellist on Through the Keyhole and three series of New Faces. She has reviewed the newspapers on This Morning and contributed to discussions on The Alan Titchmarsh Show, Daybreak and The Michael Ball Show, the last of which was cancelled in 2010. Her autobiography was entitled Love, Sex and the Pursuit of Chocolate.

She appeared on the Big Brother spin-off show Big Brother's Bit on the Side a number of times as well as entering the Big Brother House for a media training task in August 2012. In 2015 she appeared on a celebrity edition of game show Pointless with Gyles Brandreth and won a trophy.

The Sunday People and Myskow, by then writing for the News of the World, lost a libel action brought by the actress Charlotte Cornwell in December 1985. A jury at the High Court awarded Cornwell £10,000 in damages. In an article for the People, Myskow had referred to Cornwell as ugly and middle-aged, and written that her "bum is too big". The damages were raised to £11,500 at a retrial after Myskow appealed, but costs were awarded against Cornwell.

Myskow has been criticised for stating that women doing their makeup on the train were "lazy and selfish", and that millennials are "snowflakes".

Myskow is a regular contributor on GB News.
