= Philip Sugden =

English historian

- Born: 27 January 1947; Hull, England
- Died: April 2014 (aged 67)
- Known for: Jack the Ripper and other studies in the history of crime

Academic background
- Education: Hull College of Commerce; University of Hull

Philip Sugden (27 January 1947 – 26 April 2014) was an English historian, best known for his comprehensive study of Jack the Ripper case, including the books The Complete History of Jack the Ripper, first published in 1994, and The Life and Times of Jack the Ripper (1996). He was the first academic historian to work on the case.

== Early life ==
Philip Sugden was born on 27 January 1947, in Kingston-upon-Hull, the younger of twin boys. His brother was John Sugden, historian and author. Their father, John Henry Sugden (1914–1996), was a painter and decorator, whose seasonal trade made him vulnerable to spells of unemployment and short hours; their mother, Lily (née Cuthbertson, 1914–1981), eventually took part-time factory work to keep the boys at school.

Philip Sugden left school at the age of 16 and was employed by Humber Joiners and in the offices of the Hull Corporation Parks Department before completing his A-levels at the Hull College of Commerce. He graduated from the University of Hull in 1972.

In 1976, he took a teaching position at Chenet School in Cannock. But his first love remained research and writing, and he had become absorbed in the history of crime in the Georgian era. A detailed study of the London underworld of Jack Sheppard, a celebrated criminal of the early 18th century, became a lifelong preoccupation.

== Studies of the Whitechapel murders ==
In 1988, Sugden returned to Hull to concentrate upon full-time research and writing. His book The Complete History of Jack the Ripper was completed after nine years of research.

As John Sugden remarked in his preface to Amy's Last Flight (p. 4), his brother's "trademarks" were "the patient collection of relevant evidence, the even-handed and fearless evaluation of primary sources, and an inherent sympathy for those who had lived in other times and circumstances."

Although Philip Sugden respected some of those who had written about Jack the Ripper, he was scathing about the amount of fraudulent and slipshod writing. In an essay for Camille Wolff's Who Was Jack the Ripper? (p. 81) he wrote:

I'm afraid that I have no patience with the bogus Ripperology that has disgraced true crime writing in recent years. The formula has unfortunately become all too familiar. First choose who you want Jack the Ripper to be. Then plunder the books, the newspapers, and, if the budget will stretch to it, the Ripper files at the Public Record Office, for facts which can be bullied into investing your fantasy with a veneer of plausibility. If you can't find anything, no matter – invent it. I'm not saying that there aren't plenty of people out there, specialists and laymen, with a genuine interest in the Ripper case. Of course there are. And it was specifically for them that I wrote my Complete History.

Sugden's book did not set out to name Jack the Ripper, but to painstakingly reconstruct the crimes within the context of the London of 1888, and to establish as accurate a record as possible. Only with such a foundation was it possible to measure the various suspects, and in his book he found insufficient evidence to accuse any of those named by the police or subsequent enquirers. The strongest case, he believed, could be made against the Polish-born George Chapman, but he emphasised that even that was weak and highly circumstantial. The book received both critical and popular success.

== Other work ==
Throughout his life, Sugden's interests were wide-ranging and he spoke authoritatively about numerous subjects, including natural history (especially fishes and the conservation movement), American frontier history, piracy and privateering, the Age of Discovery, crime in 18th-century London, the campaigns of Alexander the Great and Hannibal, popular music (particularly American punk rock) and French cinema. In all of these areas, he found topics of consuming interest, to which he devoted close and painstaking research.

Two books were almost completed at the time of his death. A Cabinet of Curiosities contained several studies of controversial or unexplained events relating to history and natural history. One of the chapters, dealing with the death of the Hull aviator Amy Johnson, was published posthumously. Sugden's greatest work was, however, his study of the career of the English criminal Jack Sheppard and the London underworld of the early 18th century. The research spanned forty years of Sugden's life, and was begun before historical crime became a fashionable subject among historians. He contributed an article on Sheppard to The Oxford Dictionary of National Biography and had almost completed The Georgian Underworld of Jack Sheppard at the time of his death. Its completion has been undertaken by his brother, John.

A work of a different and lighter kind, produced jointly with his brother, was a sprawling epistolary novel based on imaginary communities in contemporary Hull and Yorkshire. It contains a lively portrait of life in East Yorkshire at that time.

== Bibliography ==
- "Puckridge: A Cautionary Tale," Ripperana no. 3 (1993), pp. 55–62.
- The Complete History of Jack the Ripper (Robinson, 1994) [revised editions published in 1995 and 2002]
- "Who Was Jack the Ripper?" in Camille Wolff, ed., Who Was Jack the Ripper? (1995), pp. 91–82.
- The Life and Times of Jack the Ripper (1996)
- "More on Hats," Ripperana no. 16 (1996), pp. 6–7.
- Reviews in Ripperana no. 19 (1997), pp. 16–21, and no. 20 (1997), pp. 16–17.
- "Jack the Ripper (The Whitechapel Murders, 1888)," in Roger Wilkes, ed., The Mammoth Book of Unsolved Crimes (1999), pp. 422–34.
- Articles on Thomas Lightowler, Elizabeth Lyon, William Page, John Rann, Gamaliel Ratsey, John Sheppard, George Joseph Smith and Sir Thomas de Veil in Colin Mathew, ed., The Oxford Dictionary of National Biography (2004), vol. 33, p. 766; vol. 34, p. 910; vol. 42, pp. 334–35; vol. 46, pp. 43–44, 107–108; vol. 50, pp. 260–63; vol. 51, pp. 135–36; and vol. 56, p. 233.
- "Lives of the Convicts: Solving a Problem in Printing History," Hackney History vol. 15 (2009), pp. 3–8.
- Amy's Last Flight: The Fate of Amy Johnson in 1941 (Highgate Press, Beverley, 2015)
- A Cabinet of Curiosities (unfinished)
- Forbidden Hero — The Georgian Underworld of Jack Sheppard (unfinished)
- The Thief of Hearts: Claude Duval and the Gentleman Highwayman in Fact and Fiction, with John Sugden (Forty Steps, 2016)
