= Jack Sheppard =

English criminal (1702-1724)

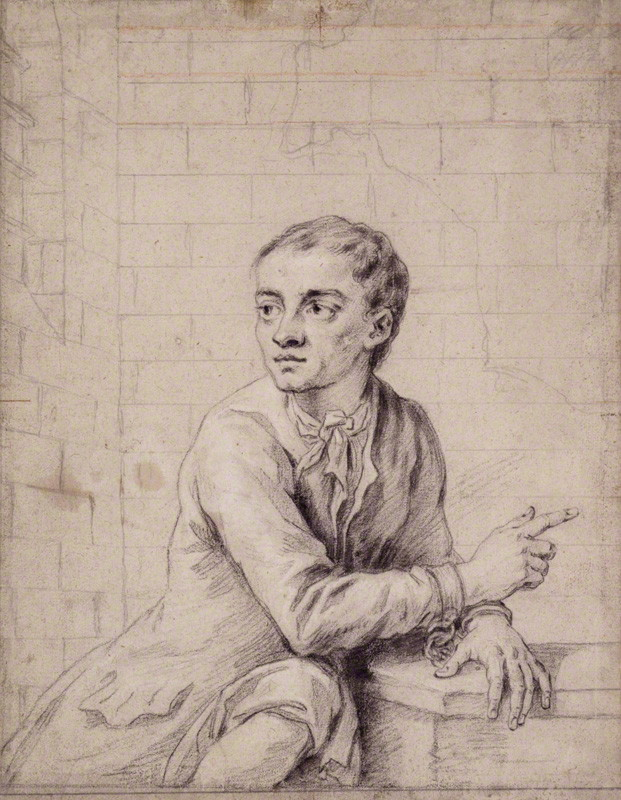
- Chalk and pencil sketch of Sheppard in Newgate Prison, attributed to Sir James Thornhill, c. 1723
- Born: 4 March 1702; Spitalfields, Middlesex, England
- Died: 16 November 1724 (aged 22); Tyburn, Middlesex, England
- Cause of death: Execution by hanging
- Other names: "Gentleman Jack", "Jack the Lad", "Honest Jack"
- Occupations: cane-chair maker, carpenter, thief, shoplifter, burglar, highwayman, pickpocket, gaol-breaker
- Known for: his numerous escapes from prison and his crimes of theft and burglary, a biography of which is thought to have been ghostwritten by Daniel Defoe.

John Sheppard (4 March 1702 – 16 November 1724), nicknamed "Honest Jack", "Gentleman Jack" or "Jack the Lad" (the origin of the British phrase), was an English criminal who became notorious in early 18th-century London.

Born into a poor family, he was apprenticed as a carpenter, but began committing theft and burglary in 1723 with little more than a year of his training to complete. He was arrested and imprisoned five times in 1724, but escaped four times from prison, making him notorious, though popular with the poorer classes. Ultimately, he was caught, convicted, and hanged at Tyburn, ending his brief criminal career after less than two years. The inability of the notorious "Thief-Taker General" Jonathan Wild to control Sheppard, and injuries suffered by Wild at the hands of Sheppard's colleague Joseph "Blueskin" Blake, resulted in Wild's demise as a criminal boss.

Sheppard was as renowned for his attempts to escape from prison as he was for his crimes. An autobiographical "Narrative", thought to have been ghostwritten by Daniel Defoe, was sold at his execution, quickly followed by popular plays. The character of Macheath in John Gay's The Beggar's Opera (1728) was based on Sheppard, keeping him well known for more than 100 years. He returned to the public consciousness around 1840, when William Harrison Ainsworth wrote a novel entitled Jack Sheppard, with illustrations by George Cruikshank. The popularity of his tale, and the fear that others would be drawn to emulate his behaviour, caused the authorities to refuse to license any plays in London with "Jack Sheppard" in the title for forty years.

== Early life ==
Sheppard was born in White's Row, in London's Spitalfields. He was baptised on 5 March, the day after he was born, at St Dunstan's, Stepney, suggesting a fear of infant mortality by his parents, perhaps because the newborn was weak or sickly. His parents named him after an older brother, John, who had died before Sheppard's birth. In life, he was better known as "Gentleman Jack" or "Jack the Lad". He had a second brother, Thomas, and a younger sister, Mary. Their father, a carpenter, died while Sheppard was young, and his sister died two years later.

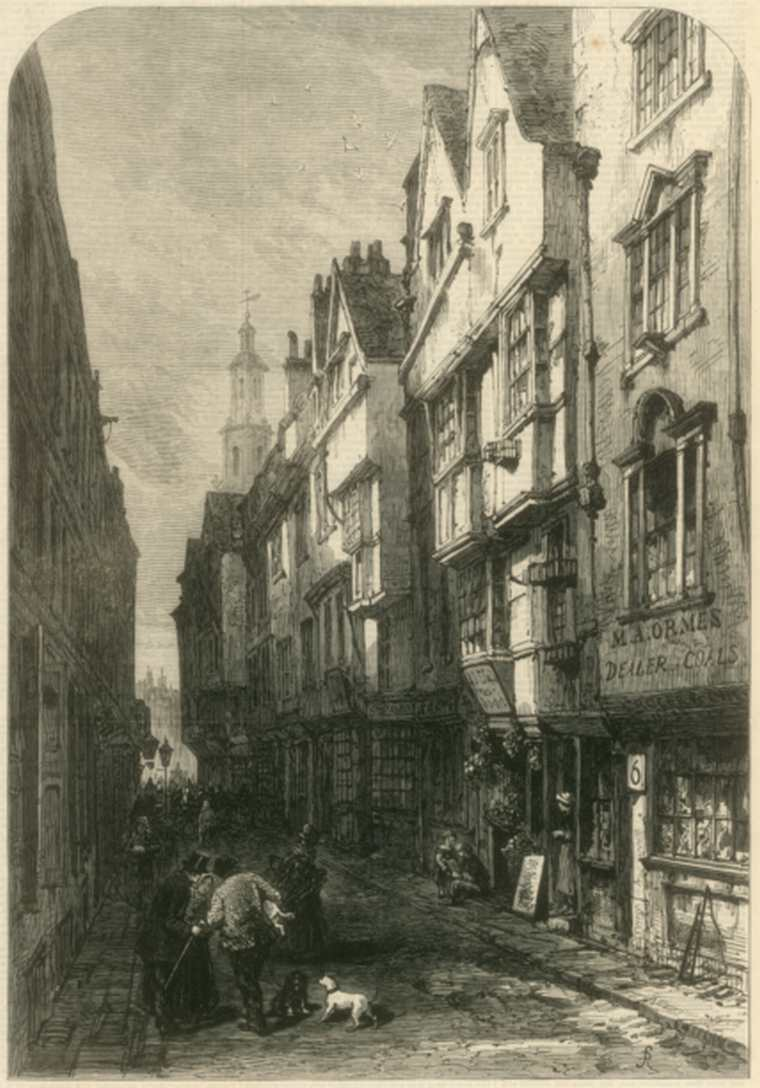
An engraving of Wych Street, from about 1870

Unable to support her family without her husband's income, Sheppard's mother sent him to Mr Garrett's School, a workhouse near St Helen's Bishopsgate, when he was six years old. Sheppard was sent out as a parish apprentice to a cane-chair maker, taking a settlement of 20 shillings, but his new master soon died. He was sent out to a second cane-chair maker, but Sheppard was treated badly. Finally, when Sheppard was 10 years old, he went to work as a shop-boy for William Kneebone, a wool draper with a shop on the Strand. Sheppard's mother had been working for Kneebone since her husband's death. Kneebone taught Sheppard to read and write and apprenticed him to a carpenter, Owen Wood, in Wych Street, off Drury Lane in Covent Garden. Sheppard signed his seven-year indenture on 2 April 1717.

By 1722, Sheppard was showing great promise as a carpenter. Aged 20, he was a small man, only 5 ft 4 in (1.63 m) and lightly built, but deceptively strong. He had a pale face with large, dark eyes, a wide mouth and a quick smile. Despite a slight stutter, his wit made him popular in the taverns of Drury Lane. He served five unblemished years of his apprenticeship but then began to become involved with crime.

Joseph Hayne, a button-moulder who owned a shop nearby, also managed a tavern named the Black Lion off Drury Lane, which he encouraged the local apprentices to frequent. The Black Lion was visited by criminals such as Joseph "Blueskin" Blake, Sheppard's future partner in crime, and self-proclaimed "Thief-Taker General" Jonathan Wild, secretly the boss of a criminal gang which operated across London and later Sheppard's implacable enemy.

According to Sheppard's autobiography, he had been an innocent until going to Hayne's tavern, but there began a preference for strong drink and the affections of Elizabeth Lyon, a prostitute also known as Edgeworth Bess (or Edgware Bess) from her place of birth at Edgeworth in Middlesex. In his History, Defoe records that Bess was "a main lodestone in attracting of him up to this Eminence of Guilt". Such, Sheppard claimed, was the source of his later ruin. Peter Linebaugh offers a more politicised version: that Sheppard's sudden transformation was a liberation from the dull drudgery of indentured labour and that he progressed from pious servitude to self-confident rebellion and Levelling.

== Criminal career ==
Sheppard began habitually drinking and whoring. Inevitably, his carpentry suffered, and he became disobedient to his master. With Lyon's encouragement, Sheppard began criminal activity in order to augment his legitimate wages. His first recorded theft was in Spring 1723, when he engaged in petty shoplifting, stealing two silver spoons while on an errand for his master to the Rummer Tavern in Charing Cross. Sheppard's misdeeds were undetected, and he progressed to larger crimes, often stealing goods from the houses where he was working. Finally, he quit the employ of his master on 2 August 1723, with less than two years of his apprenticeship left, although he continued to work as a journeyman carpenter. He was not suspected of the crimes, and progressed to burglary, in company with criminals in Jonathan Wild's gang.

He relocated to Fulham, living as husband and wife with Lyon at Parsons Green, before relocating to Piccadilly. When Lyon was arrested and imprisoned at St Giles's Roundhouse, the beadle, a Mr Brown, refused to let Sheppard visit, so he broke in and took her away.

=== Arrested and escaped twice ===
Sheppard was first arrested after a burglary he committed with his brother, Tom, and his mistress, Lyon, in Clare Market on 5 February 1724. Tom, also a carpenter, had already been convicted once for stealing tools from his master the previous autumn and burned in the hand. Tom was arrested again on 24 April 1724. Afraid that he would be hanged this time, Tom informed on Jack, and a warrant was issued for Jack's arrest.

Jonathan Wild was aware of Sheppard's thefts, as Sheppard had fenced some stolen goods through one of Wild's men, William Field. Wild asked another of his men, James Sykes (known as "Hell and Fury") to challenge Sheppard to a game of skittles at Redgate's public house near Seven Dials. Sykes betrayed Sheppard to a Mr Price, a constable from the parish of St Giles, to gather the usual £40 reward for giving information resulting in the conviction of a felon. The magistrate, Justice Parry, had Sheppard imprisoned overnight on the top floor of St Giles's Roundhouse pending further questioning, but Sheppard escaped within three hours by breaking through the timber ceiling and lowering himself to the ground with a rope fashioned from bedclothes. Still wearing irons, Sheppard coolly joined the crowd that had been attracted by the sounds of his breaking out. He distracted their attention by pointing to the shadows on the roof and shouting that he could see the escapee, and then swiftly departed.

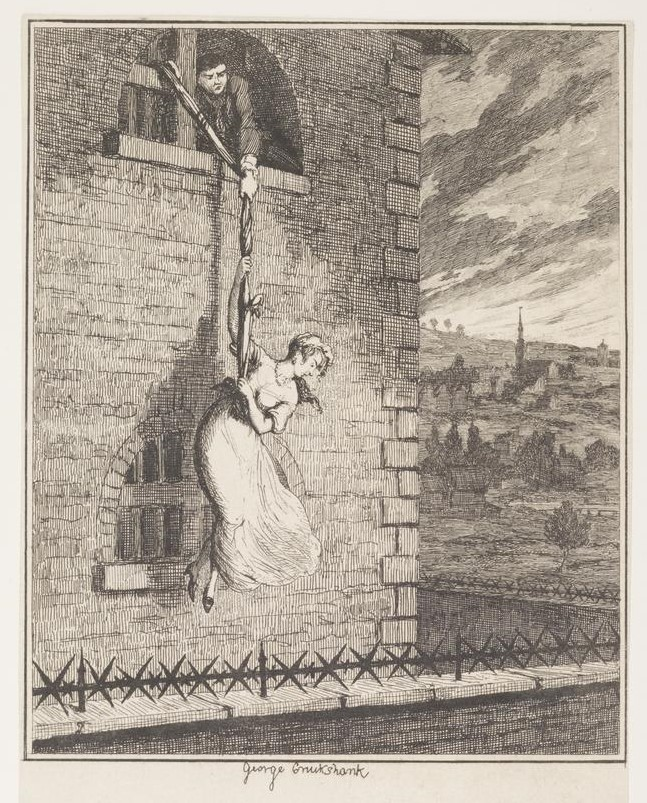
Jack used a rope of knotted bedclothes to lower Bess during their escape from the New Prison in Clerkenwell.

On 19 May 1724, Sheppard was arrested for a second time, caught in the act of picking a pocket in Leicester Fields (near present-day Leicester Square). He was detained overnight in St Ann's Roundhouse in Soho and visited there the next day by Lyon; she was recognised as his wife and locked in a cell with him. They appeared before Justice Walters, who sent them to the New Prison in Clerkenwell, but they escaped from their cell, known as the Newgate Ward, within a matter of days. By 25 May, Whitsun Monday, Sheppard and Lyon had filed through their manacles; they removed a bar from the window and used their knotted bed-clothes to descend to ground level. Finding themselves in the yard of the neighbouring Bridewell, they clambered over the 22-foot-high (6.7 m) prison gate to freedom. This feat was widely publicised, not least because Sheppard was only a small man, and Lyon was a large, buxom woman.

=== Third arrest, trial, and third escape ===
Sheppard's thieving abilities were admired by Jonathan Wild. Wild demanded that Sheppard surrender his stolen goods for Wild to fence, and so take the greater profits, but Sheppard refused. He began to work with Joseph "Blueskin" Blake, and they burgled Sheppard's former master, William Kneebone, on Sunday 12 July 1724. Wild could not permit Sheppard to continue outside his control and began to seek Sheppard's arrest. Unfortunately for Sheppard, his fence, William Field, was one of Wild's men. After Sheppard had a brief foray with Blueskin as highwaymen on the Hampstead Road on Sunday 19 July and Monday 20 July, Field informed on Sheppard to Wild. Wild believed Lyon would know Sheppard's whereabouts, so he plied her with drinks at a brandy shop near Temple Bar until she betrayed him. Sheppard was arrested a third time at Blueskin's mother's brandy shop in Rosemary Lane, east of the Tower of London (later renamed Royal Mint Street), on 23 July by Wild's henchman, Quilt Arnold.

Sheppard was imprisoned in Newgate Prison pending his trial at the next Assize of oyer and terminer. He was prosecuted on three charges of theft at the Old Bailey, but was acquitted on the first two due to lack of evidence. Kneebone, Wild and Field gave evidence against him on the third charge, the burglary of Kneebone's house. He was convicted on 12 August, the case "being plainly prov'd", and sentenced to death. On Monday 31 August, the very day when the death warrant arrived from the court in Windsor setting Friday 4 September as the date for his execution, Sheppard escaped. Having loosened an iron bar in a window used when talking to visitors, he was visited by Lyon and Poll Maggott, who distracted the guards while he removed the bar (security was lax compared to that of later years; the guard-to-prisoner ratio at Newgate in 1724 was 1:90, and wives could stay overnight). His slight build enabled him to climb through the resulting gap in the grille, and he was smuggled out of Newgate in women's clothing that his visitors had brought him. He took a coach to Blackfriars Stairs, a boat up the River Thames to the horse ferry in Westminster, near the warehouse where he hid his stolen goods, and completed his escape.

=== Fourth arrest and final escape ===
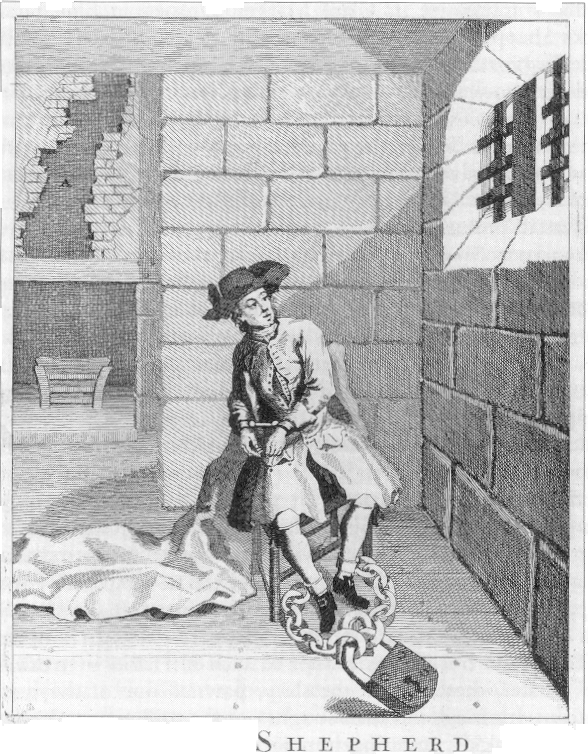
Jack Sheppard in Newgate Prison before his fourth escape, from the frontispiece of the "Narrative" of his life, published by John Applebee in 1724. The label "A" marks the hole he made in the chimney during his escape.

By this time, Sheppard was a hero to a segment of the population, being a cockney, non-violent, handsome and seemingly able to escape punishment for his crimes at will. He spent a few days out of London, visiting a friend's family in Chipping Warden in Northamptonshire, but was soon back in town. He evaded capture by Wild and his men but was arrested again on 9 September by a posse from Newgate as he hid on Finchley Common, and returned to the condemned cell at Newgate. His fame had increased with each escape, and he was visited in prison by various people. His plans to escape during September were thwarted twice when the guards found files and other tools in his cell, and he was transferred to a strong-room in Newgate known as the "Castle", put in leg irons, and chained to two metal staples in the floor to prevent further escape attempts. After demonstrating to his gaolers that these measures were insufficient, by showing them how he could use a small nail to unlock the horse padlock at will, he was bound more tightly and handcuffed. In his History, Defoe reports that Sheppard made light of his predicament, joking that "I am the Sheppard, and all the Gaolers in the Town are my Flock, and I cannot stir into the Country, but they are all at my Heels Baughing after me".

Meanwhile, "Blueskin" Blake was arrested by Wild and his men on Friday 9 October, and Tom, Jack's brother, was transported for robbery on Saturday 10 October 1724. New court sessions began on Wednesday 14 October, and Blueskin was tried on Thursday 15 October, with Field and Wild again giving evidence. Their accounts were not consistent with the evidence that they gave at Sheppard's trial, but Blueskin was convicted anyway. Enraged, Blueskin attacked Wild in the courtroom, slashing his throat with a pocket-knife and causing an uproar. Wild was lucky to survive, and his control of his criminal gang was weakened while he recuperated.

Taking advantage of the disturbance, which spread to Newgate Prison next door and continued into the night, Sheppard escaped for the fourth time. He unlocked his handcuffs and removed the chains. Still encumbered by his leg irons, he attempted to climb up the chimney, but his path was blocked by an iron bar set into the brickwork. He removed the bar and used it to break through the ceiling into the "Red Room" above the "Castle", a room which had last been used some seven years before to confine aristocratic Jacobite prisoners after the Battle of Preston. Still wearing his leg irons as night began, he then broke through six barred doors into the prison chapel, then to the roof of Newgate, 60 feet (18 m) above the ground. He went back down to his cell to get a blanket, then back to the roof of the prison, and used the blanket to reach the roof of an adjacent house, owned by William Bird, a turner. He broke into Bird's house, and went down the stairs and out into the street at around midnight without disturbing the occupants. Escaping through the streets to the north and west, Sheppard hid in a cowshed in "Tottenham" (near modern Tottenham Court Road). Spotted by the barn's owner, Sheppard told him that he had escaped from Bridewell Prison, having been imprisoned there for failing to provide for a (nonexistent) bastard son. His leg irons remained in place for several days until he persuaded a passing shoemaker to accept the considerable sum of 20 shillings to bring a blacksmith's tools and help him remove them, telling him the same tale. His manacles and leg irons were later recovered in the rooms of Kate Cook, one of Sheppard's mistresses. This escape astonished everyone. Daniel Defoe, working as a journalist, wrote an account for John Applebee, The History of the Remarkable Life of John Sheppard. In his History, Defoe reports the belief in Newgate that the Devil came in person to assist Sheppard's escape.

=== Final capture ===
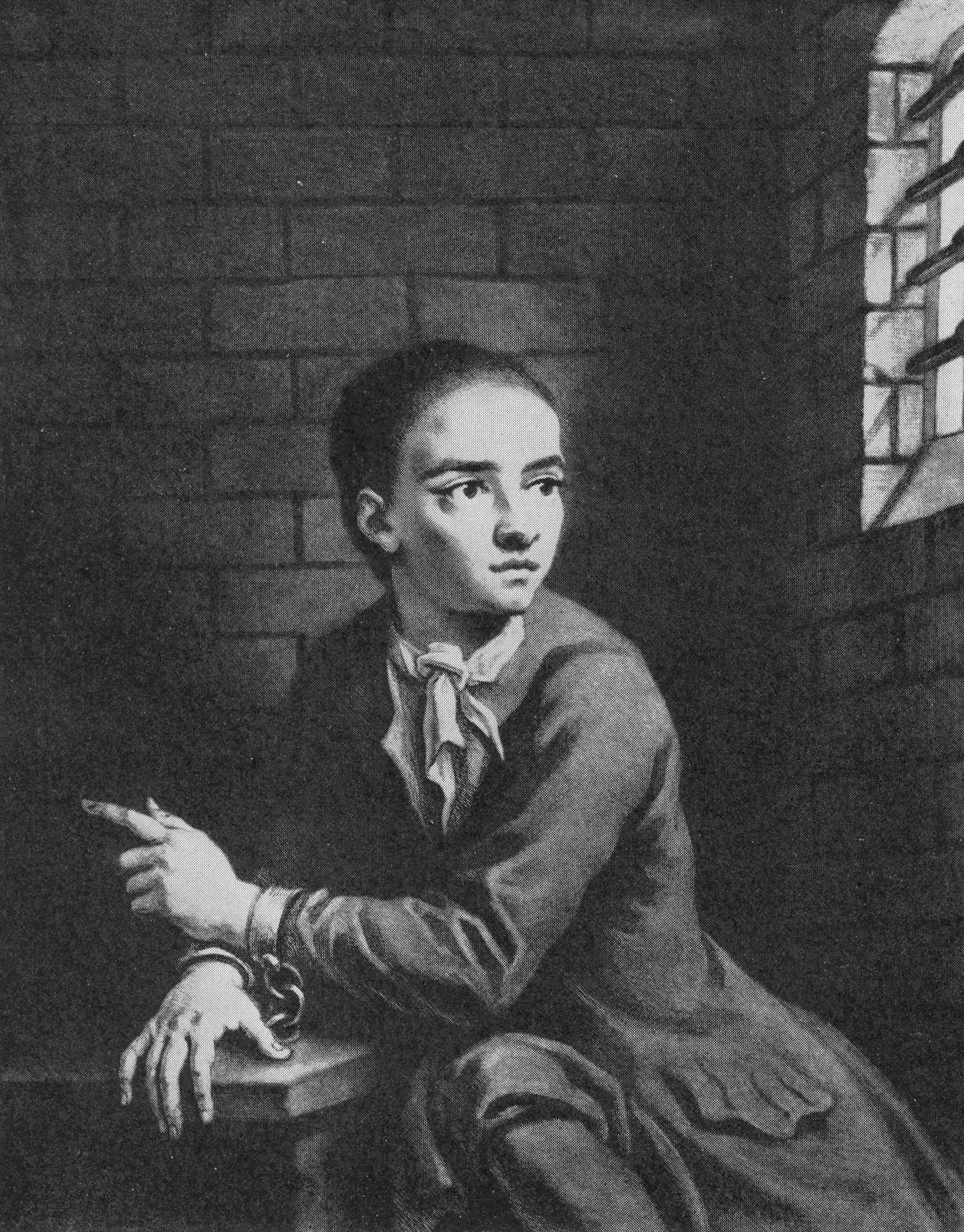
Jack Sheppard, in Newgate Prison awaiting execution, in an engraving by George White from 1728, based on a painting by James Thornhill which has not survived. Note that Sheppard's hair is cropped and that he points toward the door.

Sheppard's final period of liberty lasted just two weeks. He disguised himself as a beggar and returned to the city. He broke into the Rawlins brothers' pawnbroker's shop in Drury Lane on the night of 29 October 1724, taking a black silk suit, a silver sword, rings, watches, a wig, and other items. He dressed himself as a dandy gentleman and used the proceeds to spend a day and the ensuing evening on the tiles with two mistresses. He was arrested a final time in the early morning on 1 November, drunk, "in a handsome Suit of Black, with a Diamond Ring and a carnelian ring on his Finger, and a fine Light Tye Peruke".

This time, Sheppard was placed in the Middle Stone Room, in the centre of Newgate next to the "Castle", where he could be observed at all times. He was also loaded with 300 pounds of iron weights. He was so celebrated that the gaolers charged high society visitors four shillings to see him, and the King's painter James Thornhill painted his portrait. Several prominent people sent a petition to King George I, begging for his sentence of death to be commuted to transportation. "The Concourse of People of tolerable Fashion to see him was exceeding Great, he was always Chearful and Pleasant to a Degree, as turning almost everything as was said onto a Jest and Banter." To a Reverend Wagstaffe who visited him, he said, according to Defoe, "One file's worth all the Bibles in the World".

Sheppard came before Mr Justice Powis in the Court of King's Bench at Westminster Hall on 10 November. He was offered the chance to have his sentence reduced by informing on his associates, but he scorned the offer, and the death sentence was confirmed. The next day, Blueskin was hanged, and Sheppard was moved to the condemned cell.

== Execution ==
The next Monday, 16 November, Sheppard was taken to the gallows at Tyburn to be hanged. He planned one more escape, but his pen-knife, intended to cut the ropes binding him on the way to the gallows, was found by a prison warder shortly before he left Newgate for the last time.

A joyous procession passed through the streets of London, with Sheppard's cart drawn along Holborn and Oxford Street accompanied by a mounted City Marshal and liveried Javelin Men. The occasion was as much as anything a celebration of Sheppard's life, attended by crowds of as many as 200,000 people (one third of London's population). The procession halted at the City of Oxford tavern on Oxford Street, where Sheppard drank a pint of sack. A carnival atmosphere pervaded Tyburn, where his "official" autobiography, published by Applebee and probably ghostwritten by Defoe, was on sale. Sheppard handed "a paper to someone as he mounted the scaffold", perhaps as a symbolic endorsement of the account in the "Narrative". His slight build had aided his previous prison escapes, but it caused him a slow death by strangulation from the hangman's noose. After hanging for the prescribed 15 minutes, his body was cut down. The crowd pressed forward to stop his body from being removed, fearing dissection; their actions inadvertently prevented Sheppard's friends from implementing a plan to take his body to a doctor in an attempt to revive him. His badly mauled remains were recovered later and buried in the churchyard of St Martin-in-the-Fields that evening.

== Legacy ==
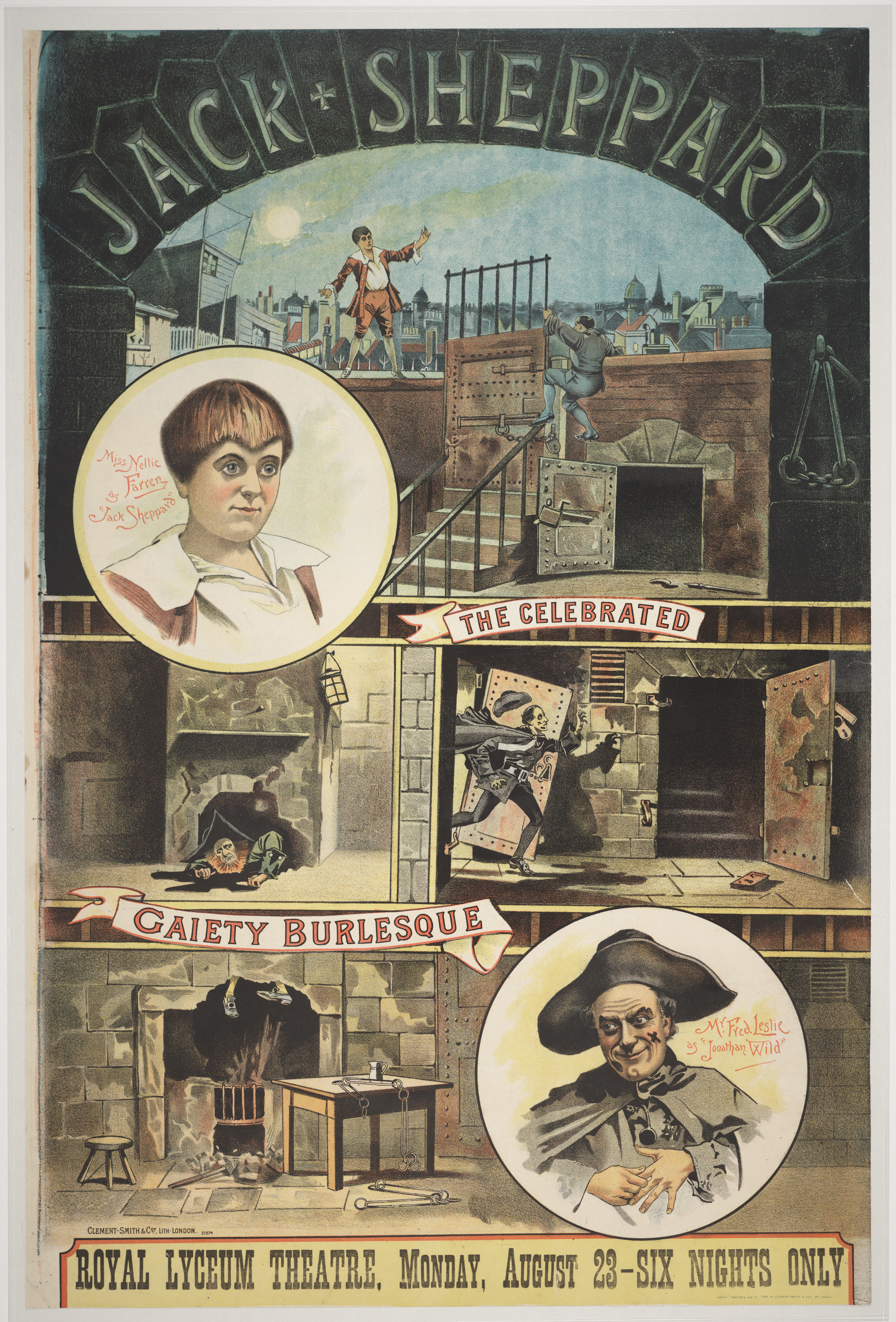
Poster for the play Jack Sheppard performed at the Royal Lyceum Theatre.

There was a spectacular public reaction to Sheppard's deeds, which were cited favourably as an example in newspapers. Pamphlets, broadsheets, and ballads were all devoted to his amazing experiences, real and fictional, and his story was adapted for the stage almost immediately. Harlequin Sheppard, a pantomime by one John Thurmond (subtitled "A night scene in grotesque characters"), opened at the Theatre Royal, Drury Lane, on Saturday 28 November, only two weeks after Sheppard's hanging. In a famous contemporary sermon, a London preacher drew on Sheppard's popular escapes as a way of holding his congregation's attention:

Let me exhort ye, then, to open the locks of your hearts with the nail of repentance! Burst asunder the fetters of your beloved lusts! – mount the chimney of hope! – take from thence the bar of good resolution! – break through the stone wall of despair!

The account of his life remained well-known through the Newgate Calendar, and a three-act farce was published but never produced, but, mixed with songs, it became The Quaker's Opera, later performed at Bartholomew Fair. An imagined dialogue between Jack Sheppard and Julius Caesar was published in the British Journal on 4 December 1724, in which Sheppard favourably compares his virtues and exploits to those of Caesar.

Perhaps the most prominent play based on Sheppard's life is John Gay's The Beggar's Opera (1728). Sheppard was the inspiration for the character Captain Macheath; his nemesis, Peachum, is based on Jonathan Wild. The play was spectacularly popular, restoring the fortune that Gay had lost in the South Sea Bubble, and was produced regularly for more than 100 years. An unperformed but published play The Prison-Breaker was turned into The Quaker's Opera (in imitation of The Beggar's Opera) and performed at Bartholomew Fair in 1725 and 1728. Two centuries later The Beggar's Opera was the basis for The Threepenny Opera of Bertolt Brecht and Kurt Weill (1928).

Sheppard's tale may have been an inspiration for William Hogarth's 1747 series of 12 engravings, Industry and Idleness, which shows the parallel habituation of an apprentice, Tom Idle, to crime, resulting in his being hanged, beside the fortunes of his fellow apprentice, Francis Goodchild, who marries his master's daughter and takes over his business, becoming wealthy as a result, eventually emulating Dick Whittington to become Lord Mayor of London.

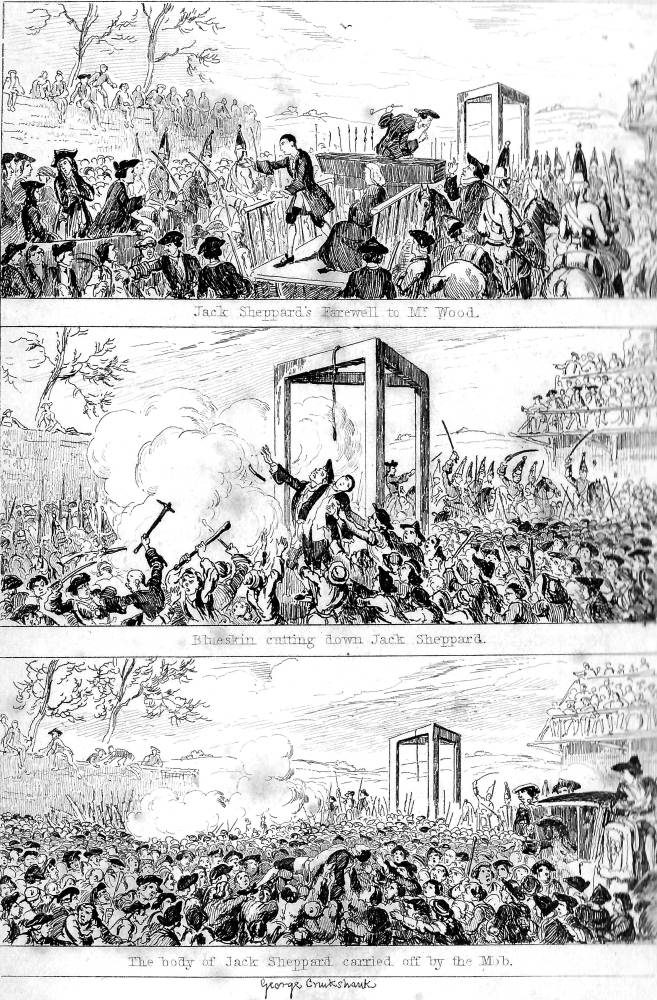
"The Last Scene" engraved by George Cruikshank in 1839 to illustrate William Harrison Ainsworth's serialised novel, Jack Sheppard. The captions read: "Jack Sheppard's Farewell to Mr Wood", "Blueskin cutting down Jack Sheppard", and "The body of Jack Sheppard carried off by the mob".

Sheppard's tale was revived during the first half of the 19th century. A melodrama, Jack Sheppard, The Housebreaker, or London in 1724, by W. T. Moncrieff was published in 1825. More successful was William Harrison Ainsworth's third novel, entitled Jack Sheppard, which was published originally in Bentley's Miscellany from January 1839 with illustrations by George Cruikshank, overlapping with the final episodes of Charles Dickens' Oliver Twist. An archetypal Newgate novel, it generally remains close to the facts of Sheppard's life, but portrays him as a daring hero. Like Hogarth's prints, the novel pairs the increasing involvement of the "idle" apprentice with crime with the fortunes of a typical melodramatic character, Thames Darrell, a foundling of aristocratic birth who defeats his evil uncle to recover his fortune. Cruikshank's images perfectly complemented Ainsworth's tale—William Thackeray wrote that "... Mr Cruickshank really created the tale, and that Mr Ainsworth, as it were, only put words to it." The novel quickly became very popular: it was published in book form later that year, before the serialised version was completed, and even outsold early editions of Oliver Twist. Ainsworth's novel was adapted into a successful play by John Buckstone in October 1839 at the Adelphi Theatre featuring (strangely enough) Mary Anne Keeley; indeed, it seems likely that Cruikshank's illustrations were deliberately created in a form that were informed by, and would be easy to repeat as, tableaux on stage. It has been described as the "exemplary climax" of "the pictorial novel dramatized pictorially".

The story generated a type of cultural mania, embellished by pamphlets, prints, cartoons, plays and souvenirs, not repeated until George du Maurier's novel Trilby in 1895. By early 1840, a cant song from Buckstone's play "Nix My Dolly, Pals, Fake Away" was reported to be "deafening us in the streets". Public alarm at the possibility that young people would emulate Sheppard's behaviour caused the Lord Chamberlain to ban, at least in London, the licensing of any plays with "Jack Sheppard" in the title for forty years. The fear may not have been entirely unfounded: Courvousier, the valet of Lord William Russell, said in one of his several confessions that the book had inspired him to murder his master. Frank and Jesse James wrote letters to the Kansas City Star signed "Jack Sheppard". Nevertheless, burlesques of the story were written after the ban was ended, including a popular Gaiety Theatre, London, piece called Little Jack Sheppard (1886) by Henry Pottinger Stephens and William Yardley, which featured Nellie Farren as Jack.

The Sheppard story has been revived three times as movies the 20th century: The Hairbreadth Escape of Jack Sheppard (1900), Jack Sheppard (1923), and Where's Jack? (1969), a British historical drama directed by James Clavell with Tommy Steele in the title role. Jake Arnott features him in his 2017 novel The Fatal Tree.

In 1971 British popular music group Chicory Tip paid tribute to Sheppard in "Don't Hang Jack", the B-side to "I Love Onions". The song, apparently sung from the viewpoint of a witness in the courtroom, describes Jack's daring exploits as a thief, and futilely begs the judge to spare Sheppard because he was loved by the women of the town, and idolised by the lads who "made him their king".

In Jordy Rosenberg's 2018 novel Confessions of the Fox, the Sheppard story was recontextualised as a queer narrative: a 21st-century academic discovers a manuscript containing Sheppard's "confessions", which tell the story of his childhood and his love affair with Edgeworth Bess, and reveals that he was a transgender man.

The reasons for the lasting legacy of Sheppard's exploits in the popular imagination have been addressed by Peter Linebaugh, who suggests that Sheppard's legend was based on the prospect of excarceration, of escape from what Michel Foucault in Folie et déraison termed the grand renfermement (Great Confinement), in which "unreasonable" members of the population were locked away and institutionalised. Linebaugh further says that the laws applied to Sheppard and similar working class criminals were a means of disciplining a potentially rebellious multitude into accepting increasingly harsh property laws. Another nineteenth-century opinion of the Jack Sheppard phenomenon was offered by Charles Mackay in Memoirs of Extraordinary Popular Delusions and the Madness of Crowds:

Whether it be that the multitude, feeling the pangs of poverty, sympathise with the daring and ingenious depredators who take away the rich man's superfluity, or whether it be the interest that mankind in general feel for the records of perilous adventure, it is certain that the populace of all countries look with admiration upon great and successful thieves.
