= Mark Herber =

British author

Mark D. Herber is a British author of genealogy, London legal history and family history books. His first book Ancestral Trails won the 1997 CILIP McColvin prize for an outstanding work of reference.

Herber is a solicitor by profession.

== Bibliography ==
- (1997) Ancestral Trails: The Complete Guide to British Genealogy and Family History. ISBN 0-7509-3510-3
- (1998) Clandestine Marriages in the Chapel and Rules of the Fleet Prison 1680–1754 Part 1. ISBN 0-9532388-1-4
- (1999) Clandestine Marriages in the Chapel and Rules of the Fleet Prison 1680–1754 Part 2. ISBN 0-9532388-4-9
- (2001) Clandestine Marriages in the Chapel and Rules of the Fleet Prison 1680–1754 Part 3. ISBN 1-903427-03-7
- (1999) Legal London (A Pictorial History), Chichester: Phillimore. ISBN 1-86077-111-4
- (2002) Criminal London (A Pictorial History from Medieval Times to 1939), Chichester: Phillimore. ISBN 1-86077-199-8
- (2006) My Ancestor Was a Lawyer with Brian Brooks. ISBN 1-903462-94-0
