= St Giles's Roundhouse =

Prison in London, England

Coordinates: 51°30′58″N 0°7′21″W

The St Giles's Roundhouse was a small roundhouse or prison, mainly used to temporarily hold suspected criminals.

It was located in the St Giles area of present-day central London, between Charing Cross Road and Holborn, which – during the 17th and 18th centuries – was a 'rookery' notorious for its thieves and other criminals.

The Roundhouse was notable for being one of the prisons from which notorious thief Jack Sheppard escaped, in 1724. The building was converted into almshouses in around 1780.
