= Finchley Common =

Common land in Middlesex, north of London

Coordinates: 51.604°N 0.163°W

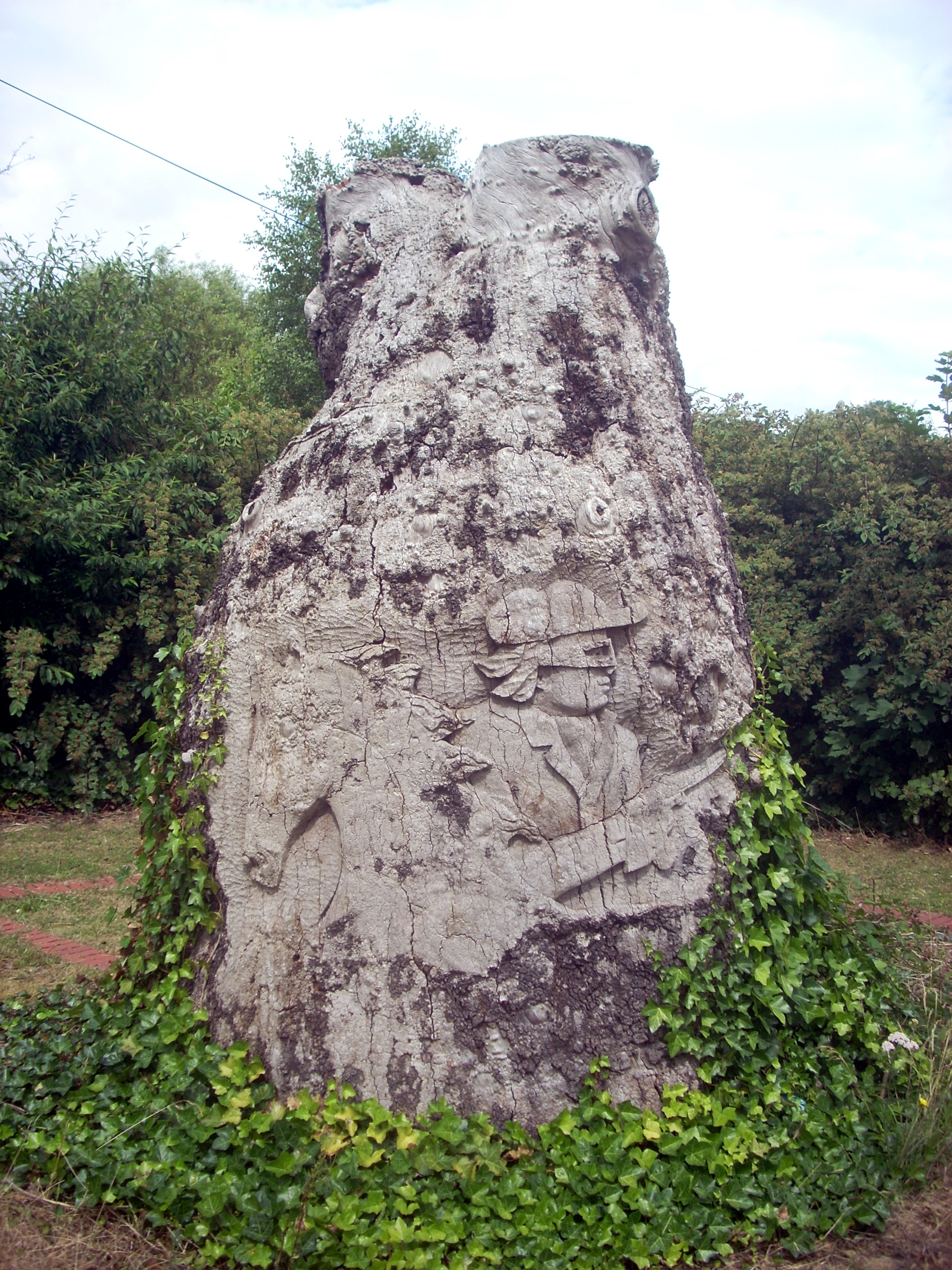
A carved tree depicting a highwayman by Great North Road, Finchley

Finchley Common was an area of land in Middlesex, north of London, and until 1816, the boundary between the parishes of Finchley, Friern Barnet and Hornsey.

== History ==
Its use as a common is quite late. Rights to the common were claimed by the inhabitants of Finchley at the beginning of the 15th century, and by the inhabitants of Friern Barnet, and Hornsey by the 16th century. Sale of timber in the 16th century by the Bishop of London, who had manorial rights to the land, led to the clearance of the woods, and after this time legal disputes between the commoners and the bishop were made reference to a "common called Finchley Wood". The earliest known use of the name Finchley Common appeared in reference to refugees escaping from plague London encamped on the common in 1603. Finchley Common occurs in Nicholas Culpeper's Herbal (1652) whereas John Gerard in his Herbal (1596) refers to Finchley Wood. (Note: Culpeper refers to Finchley Common as the location for juniper bushes in The English Physician; or an Astrological Physical, a discourse of the vulgar herbs of this nation (better known as Culpeper’s Herbal) 1652. John Gerard in his Herbal (1596) refers to Finchley Wood when describing wort berries.)

As a place name Finchley Common continued long after the enclosure of 1816. Places which were said to be Finchley Common represented much of Finchley's eastern flank. These included the Torrington public house (in what we would now call North Finchley), and also the White Lion in East Finchley.

The last known active use of Finchley Common as a place name is an isolated property advert in The Times in 1897. There are sections of open ground in the London Borough of Haringey and the London Borough of Barnet which are still closely associated with Finchley Common (though no one uses the name), mostly woodland: Coppetts Wood, Coldfall Wood, and the Glebelands.

=== Size ===
Because of various claims made by the Bishop of London, and gradual encroachment Finchley Common's size varied. It was certainly greater than 1,240 acres (5.0 km^{2}) at its peak. By the time of the enclosure awards in 1816 encroachment had reduced it to around 900 acres (3.6 km^{2}).

=== Encroachment ===
Small settlements began to encroach after the majority of the wood had been cleared in the 16th century. This was a very gradual process, but those who were fined by the bishop's steward for "contempt in enclosing a piece of the waste", occasionally went on to be allowed to stay on payment of rent, or even an annual fine. An example is Edward Hartill who was fined £1 in 1725 for encroachment, but who later went on to pay rent. Early encroachments included: Fallows Corner, Brownswell, Woodhouse, Woodside, Cuckhold's Haven, and Cold Harbour.

With expanding importance of the Great North Road (which ran across the Common) a number of inns were established from the end of the 17th century including: The White Lion, The Bald Faced Stag, the Horse Shoe, The Green Man and The Swan. The last of these, The Swan started as a windmill. The Bald Faced Stag and the White Lion are still in existence in modern-day East Finchley.

=== The hog market ===
At the southern end of the common an unofficial hog market developed by the end of the 17th century which became the largest in Middlesex. There were market days on Wednesday and Thursday (1717) with a lot of the business being conducted in inns like The Sow and Pigs. "Hogs are kept in considerable numbers, but chiefly by the malt-distillers, for whom they are purchased lean, at a large market, held on Finchley Common, and to which they are brought from Shropshire, and other distant counties: great numbers of fatted hogs are also bought for the hog-butcheries about London; and the bacon cured here is but little inferior to that brought from Wilts and Yorkshire." After enclosure the market continued.

By the 1840s the market had decreased in importance and was only held on Mondays, and according to Kelly's Directory of 1845 was frequented by butchers from the West End of London. By the 1890s auctions were only held every few months, and by the 1920s all trading ceased.

=== Military encampments ===
The common proved useful as a military encampment after the English Civil War until the Napoleonic War. The first known use was encampment was that of General Monck's army in 1660 and the Restoration. In May 1743 about a hundred soldiers of the 42nd Highland Regiment (The Black Watch) mutinied after attending a review on the common as they understood that they were soon to be dispatched to perilous duties in the British Caribbean colonies. Two years later, the common was the expected field of battle if the Bonnie Prince Charlie had reached London. It was here that the Duke of Cumberland mustered his army before their march north in 1745.

The last major encampment was in 1780, when the Queen's Regiment and the South Hampshire Militia were quartered on the Common during the Gordon Riots. Until the 1820s, after which the enclosure had been completed, the area was used occasionally used for military training, but ceased to be of any significant military use. One of the latest known reports is a sham fight by the St Andrew's and St George's Volunteers in 1804.

=== Highwaymen ===
Finchley Common is most associated with highwaymen. Its reputation was such that Sir Gilbert Elliott, Earl of Minto, stated in a letter to his wife that he would not "trust my throat on Finchley Common in the dark", and victims included great men such as Edmund Burke in 1774. It is said that Ralph Chaplin, the lover of Lady Katherine Ferrers "the Wicked Lady", was caught on Finchley Common (c.1660). There were certainly robberies committed before this date but the first crime in which Finchley Common is referred to in the Proceedings of the Old Bailey is that committed by Philip Maqueer on John Hansey in April 1690.

A few of the highwaymen, such as Edmond Tooll (hanged and gibbeted in 1700), and Joseph Jackson (hanged 1720) were "of the parish", but the vast majority were from elsewhere, mostly London. Gibbets were certainly located at the six mile (10 km) stone, possibly at Tally Ho Corner, and no doubt elsewhere. They were in use from at least the 1670s until the gibbeting of Cornelius Courte (a highwayman) in 1789. (Note: The 18th-century six mile stone was on the eastern side of the road where Bedford Road, N2, enters Finchley High Road today.)

Famous villains associated with the common include Jack Sheppard and Dick Turpin. Neither was ever known to have actually committed any crimes on the common. Jack Sheppard was taken prisoner on the common in September 1724 reputedly wearing the blue and white apron of a butcher, and kept overnight at the George Inn in the Hog Market by a "posse of Newgate Prison turnkeys". Dick Turpin was not associated with the place until the period after enclosure.

From the 1830s until 1952 a large oak, which stood in Oak Lane opposite the St. Pancras and Islington Cemetery was romantically known as Turpin's Oak. (Note: Although the same tree appears in an early 19th-century topographical collection simply titled as "A Great Oak" when felled in 1952 was found to be riddled with lead shot (see http://www.collectbritain.co.uk).) However the endeavours of the less famous are often more interesting. Two known as Everett and Williams went as far as drawing up a legally witnessed contract to the effect that they would split their ill-gotten gains after a year's work in 1725. (Note: The contract was actually broken and proved in court, resulting in a fine of £20 against Williams. The money may have been gained criminally, but as no specific case was referred to in court the two men were beyond the law. The case proved to be too much of a scandal, and both Everett and the solicitors on both sides, were fined £50 by the court.)

It has been said that enclosure was the end of the highwayman on Finchley Common; but actually the period of this kind of crime was ending with the encouragement of paper money (then easily traced) through Bank Restriction Act 1797 (37 Geo. 3. c. 45). This enabled the use of £1 notes, and consequently travellers to London no longer carried huge amounts of gold on them. The other was the introduction of a simple police force: the Bow Street Horse Patrol patrolled the high road from Highgate to Barnet between 1805 and 1851.

It was this patrol rather than enclosure that terminated the age of the highwayman on Finchley Common, but enclosure was generally held as responsible at the time. The last recognisable highwaymen are George Hurt and Enoch Roberts, who robbed Charles Locke in 1807 which is also the first case in which a member of the patrol (Wiliam Pickering) is mentioned. (Note: Echos of the activities of the highwaymen would periodically surface. Secret hiding places in local inns like the Bald Faced Stag were, of course, attributed to the activities of the most famous (such as Dick Turpin), and his ghost periodically makes an appearance. In January 1820 woodsmen in Coldfall Woods discovered two wooden boxes, which in turn contained tin boxes, which contained guns, flints, clothes, brass buttons, and coins from the time of George II.)

=== Enclosure ===
Sir John Sinclair, President of the Board of Agriculture during the Napoleonic Wars, made a call for the enclosure of Finchley Common in 1803. "Let us not be satisfied with the liberation of Egypt, or the subjugation of Malta, but let us subdue Finchley Common; let us conquer Hounslow Heath, let us compel Epping Forest to submit to the yoke of improvement." But an active campaign for enclosure (the process of transferring common land into individual ownership) began in 1805. It was "instigated" by John Bacon (a local land owner at Friern Barnet).

The Finchley Inclosures Act 1811 (51 Geo. 3. c. xxiii) provided for the enclosure, but the allotment awards (who got what) were not published until 1816. The common was placed in the Finchley parish, although Friern Barnet (but not Hornsey) freeholders and copyholders were granted allotments. In all there were 231 general allotments made.

The process of "awards" of 1816 benefited only the landowners, in particular the Bishop of London, Thomas Allen, lord of the manor of Finchley at Bibbesworth, 96 acres (390,000 m^{2}), and the rector of Finchley, a massive 117 acres (0.47 km^{2}). (Note: 10 'Finchley: Public services', A History of the County of Middlesex: Volume 6: Friern Barnet, Finchley, Hornsey with Highgate (1980), pp. 79–82 The enclosure was probably delayed by debates over awards, but there is a possibility that the common's military use took precedence during what was a time of national emergency. These awards and the plan of 1814 are available to view at London Borough of Barnet local studies unit in Mill Hill.) The costs of enclosure were raised through the sale of parcels of land.

The Regents Canal Company, had acquired 105 acres (0.42 km^{2}) of land to use as a reservoir at a cost of £80 per acre, and much was sold to Thomas Collins, of Woodhouse. (Note: The canal company decided on the Welsh Harp site instead and sold the land in July 1818. Oddly enough the reservoir appears on the 1814 award plan.) An area of 15 acres (61,000 m^{2}) was set aside in the act of 1811 as fuel land, to be rented out to local farmers with the money used as a winter dole of fuel to the "deserving poor". (Note: The land was converted into garden allotments in the late 1840s, but passed into the hands of one of the trustees who turned them back into hayfields. The land was reopened as allotments in March 1890, after the Finchley Allotment League (modelling itself on the Birmingham Allotment League) forced the trustees to adhere to the Allotments Extension Act 1882 (45 & 46 Vict. c. 80) requiring such land to be so used where there was local demand. The Fuel Lands are still used for allotments, but are now administered by the Finchley Charities. As such these allotments are the last lands governed by the Finchley Inclosures Act 1811.)

=== After enclosure ===
The enclosed common with its excellent road connection to London was attractive to agencies that required large expanses of land. Later landowners were advertising in The Times land which was "well adapted for a cemetery of public building, situated near the high north road". The first of these, the St. Pancras Cemetery, was established in 1852. Enclosure also had an immediate effect upon agriculture, most of the former common lands being in a "high state of cultivation" by 1817, but without careful husbandry, however, the soil became exhausted by the 1830s. Much of the land became hay meadow, and later it was subsumed in the general trend to suburban development.

== See also ==
- Coppetts Wood and Scrublands
- Glebelands Local Nature Reserve
