= Horace Bleackley =

English writer

Horace William Bleackley (1868 – 30 July 1931) was an English writer of fiction and works of history and literary research.

He sometimes used the pseudonym "Tivoli".

Bleackley was born in Prestwich, Lancashire, and educated at Cheltenham College, Repton School, and University College, Oxford.

His early work was mostly fiction, but as the years went by he turned his hand increasingly to history.

Bleackley married Ruth Mary Gabriel, a daughter of Edmund Gabriel, and they had four children, Edward Overall Bleackley (1898–1976); Sheelah Bleackley (born 1904), Aline Ruth Gabrielle Bleackley (1906–1954) and Horace Vivian Bleackley (1907–1983).

At the time of his death, Bleackley was living in the south of France at Villa Isabelle, Cannes. He died at the Hotel Beau Rivage in Lausanne, Switzerland, on 30 July 1931. His estate was valued at £25,432, and probate was granted to his widow and his sons Edward, a stockbroker, and Horace, a merchant.

== Selected works ==
- A Defender of the Faith: The Romance of a Business Man (London: Griffith and Farran, 1892)
- Une Culotte: or, A New Woman. An Impossible Story of Modern Oxford (London: Digby, Long, 1894)
- A Short Innings: A Public School Episode (London: Digby, Long, 1897)
- Tales of the Stumps (London: Ward, Lock, 1901)
- Some Distinguished Victims of the Scaffold (London: K. Paul, Trench, Trübner, 1905)
- The Story of a Beautiful Duchess: being an account of the life & times of Elizabeth Gunning, Duchess of Hamilton & Argyll (New York, E. P. Dutton and Co., 1907)
- Ladies fair and frail; sketches of the demi-monde during the eighteenth century (London and New York: J. Lane, 1909)
- Les grandes courtisanes anglaises du xviiie siècle (Paris: 1910)
- Life of John Wilkes (London and New York: J. Lane, 1917)
- The Lost Diary (London, E. Nash Co., 1919)
- Anymoon (London: The Bodley Head, 1919)
- The Monster (London: William Heinemann, 1920)
- Casanova in England, being the account of the visit to London in 1763-4 of Giacomo Casanova, chevalier de Seingalt; his schemes, enterprises & amorous adventures, with a description of the nobility, gentry & fashionable courtesans whom he encountered, as told by himself (New York: Knopf, 1925)
- A Tour in Southern Asia (London: John Lane the Bodley Head, 1928)
- The hangmen of England: how they hanged and whom they hanged: the life story of "Jack Ketch" through two centuries (London: Taylor & Francis, 1929)
- The Trial of Jack Sheppard (London: Wm Gaunt & Sons, 1933)
