= Thief-taker =

Private individual hired to capture criminals

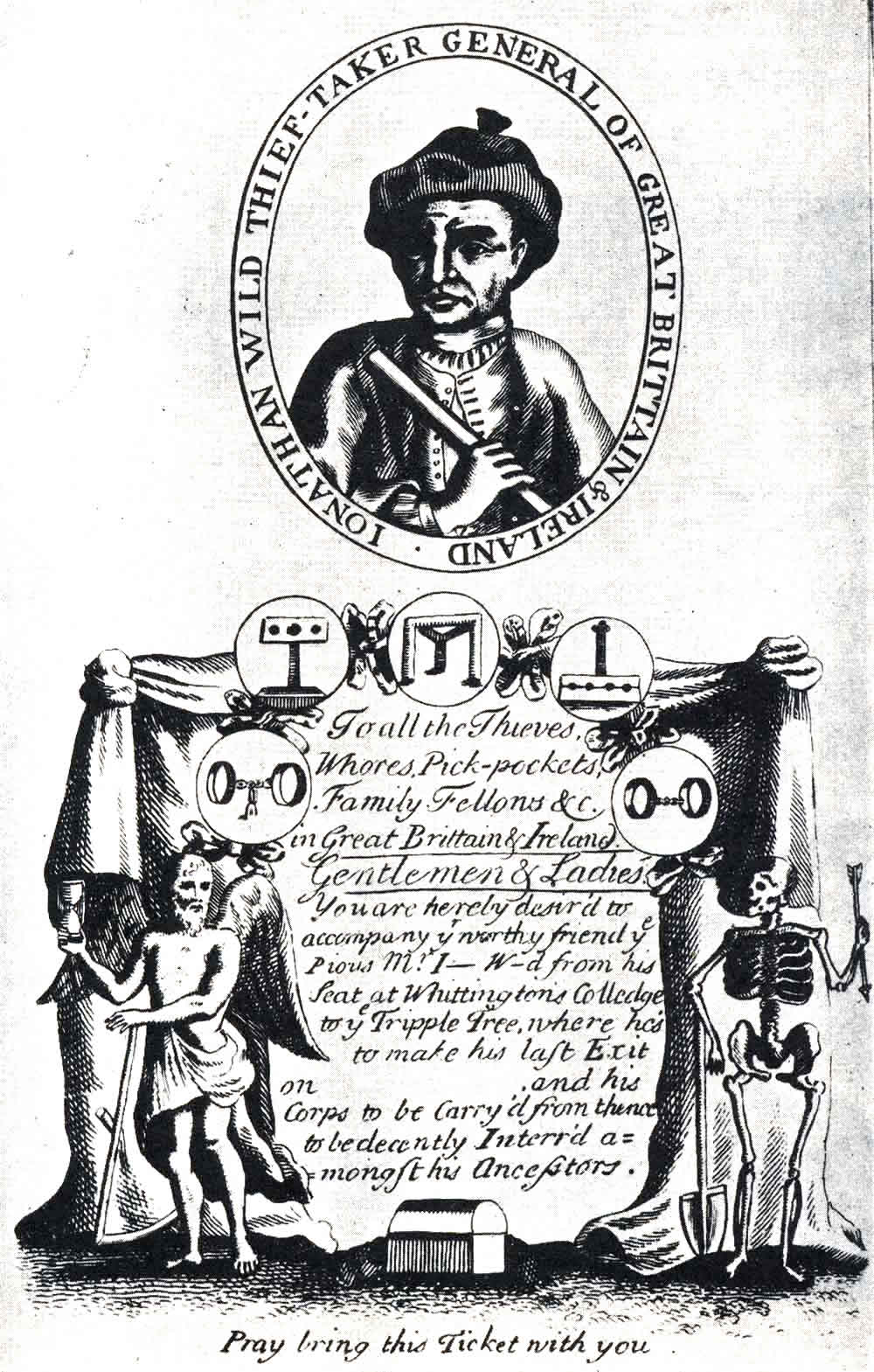
- An original gallows ticket for viewing the hanging of one of the most notorious thief-takers, Jonathan Wild, who was executed for operating on both sides of the law, with his "Thief-Taker General" emblem design on the top. Thief taking was a common law enforcement occupation beginning in the 17th century and existed until the mid-19th century when it was replaced by professional modern police forces.

Occupation
- Activity sectors: London, England

Description
- Competencies: crime prevention, crime detection, criminal apprehension, recovery of stolen goods
- Fields of employment: Law enforcement
- Related jobs: watchman, bounty hunter, bail bondsman, slave catcher, private policeman, police officer

In English legal history, a thief-taker was a private individual hired to capture criminals. The widespread establishment of professional police in England did not occur until the 19th century. With the rising crime rate and newspapers to bring this to the attention of the public, thief-takers arose to partially fill the void in bringing criminals to justice. These were private individuals much like bounty hunters. However, thief-takers were usually hired by crime victims, while bounty hunters were paid by bail bondsmen to catch fugitives who skipped their court appearances and hence forfeited their bail. Both types also collected bounties offered by the authorities.

Sometimes, thief-takers would act as go-betweens, negotiating the return of stolen goods for a fee. However, they were often corrupt themselves, for example extorting protection money from the criminals they were supposed to catch. Government-funded rewards for the capture of criminals were a corrupting influence, leading directly to the Macdaniel scandal.

== Historical and political context ==
England in the seventeenth and eighteenth century suffered a great deal of political and economic disorders that brought violence into its streets. This was particularly evident in the capital and its neighbourhoods, where the population almost corresponded to that of England and Wales together. In fact London was expanding at a fast pace, so that there were no precise division between wealthy and poor areas, the rich living next to the poor. A major cause was immigration: an impressive number of different cultural groups migrated to the big city in search of fortune and social mobility, contributing to saturate jobs availability and making cohabitation a difficult matter.

Streets in the metropolis were dark at night, and poorly lit, which allowed the proliferation of criminal activities, since lawbreakers were difficult to spot in the dark. Night watchmen patrolling the streets at night were not a guarantee of security. Often they were inefficient, did not join efforts with others for maintaining the peace, or were corrupt themselves.

The English judicial system was not very developed in the seventeenth and eighteenth centuries, as it was based on the Statute of Winchester of 1285, which created a basic organisation for keeping the peace prescribing the contribution of all citizens for: patrolling the streets at night in turns, hurrying to the "hue and cry", serving as a parish constable for a period of time, and being armed with suitable objects for intervention in case of necessity.

=== The seventeenth century ===
The seventeenth century saw a peculiar phase of political and religious instability: the Glorious Revolution brought William III to reign over England, and the rise of violence in the streets of the capital because of the removal of armed soldiers from service; the government feared conspiracy and felt the urgent need to protect its currency from coiners and clippers; on the other side, a period of poor harvests contributed to deepen people's bad conditions and the issues of public security that poverty originates.

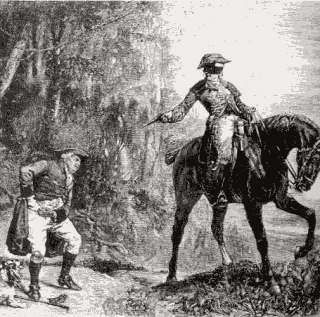
A highwayman, from an old print.

In this period property was the most valuable thing to people: for this reason, what affected citizens the most were property crimes. Theft was the most perpetrated crime, and the most tried at the Old Bailey: it was mainly caused by hunger and poverty, but also by the aspiration to social mobility. Common petty crimes such as shoplifting or theft by servants became more and more frequent, later culminating with the pressure for turning them into capital offences as deterrent. Stealing from shops that exposed their luxury goods in their windows was a great temptation to women in particular, who desired to have the latest fashion or imitate the higher social class style. Furthermore, the freedom of travelling safely was connected to the importance of commercial trades, hence, attacking people on the main roads was a threat to the economic system and already a capital offence. Those who committed thefts or robberies on the King's Highways, namely the streets of London and its major surrounding roads, were called highwaymen. These individuals were often brutal and worked together in gangs carrying weapons with them to commit robberies with violence. Gangs were particularly feared because of their alleged connection with political dissidence and plotting. The counterfeit of money and clipping were as well a danger to the economy of the state, as they diminished the actual value of hard cash and increased the inflationary pressure. This practice was to be reduced with the Great Recoinage of 1696. In addition to the financial issue, coiners were thought to be politically involved with the Jacobites in plotting against the king.

Along with the rise of criminal issues, concern with morality started to be taken into account since they were thought to be highly connected: sinning and breaking the law were the two sides of the same coin. This belief led to the Reformation of Manners campaign against brothels, which were thought to be frequented mostly by criminals. Homosexuality was another moral target for The Societies for the Reformation of Manners, who made use of informers to bring to an end the business of molly houses and sentence homosexuals to death.

In the 1690s the criminal activity became so critical that it urged the government to take alternative measures: a series of rewards were introduced by statute to stimulate the prosecution and conviction of felons.

=== The eighteenth century ===
Another dark period of disorders and a climate of violence marked the 1720s. England became involved in the War of the Spanish Succession in 1702, which lasted until 1713, and brought a number of armed ex-soldiers to wander along London streets, who played a part in the rise of violent crime. Moreover, in the years following the war the city was ground for violent riots and protests against the state, subversive political dissidents, conspirators and Jacobite affiliates.

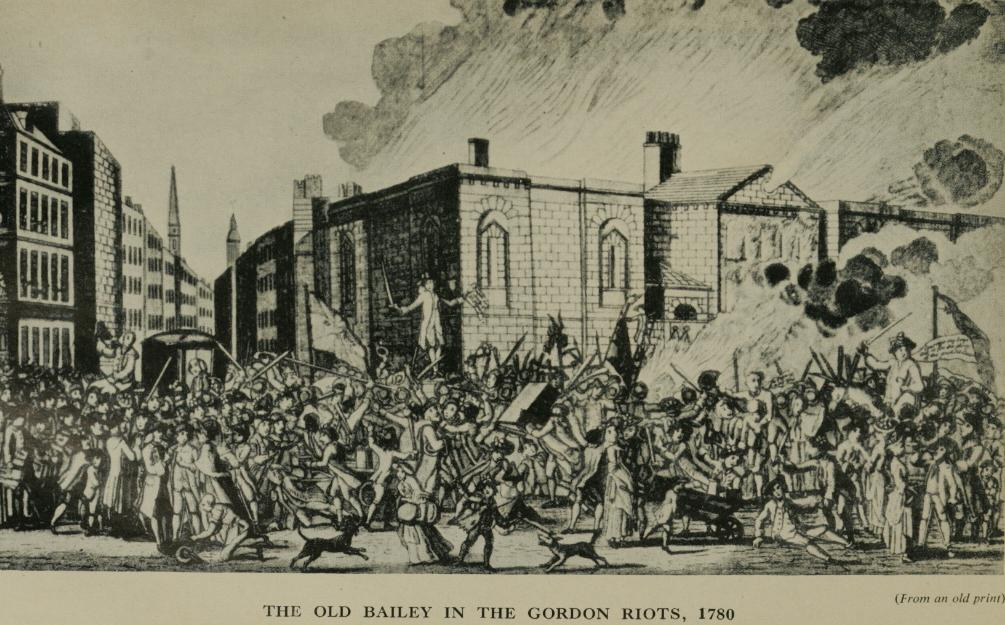
The Old Bailey in the Gordon Riots, 1780

After the wild speculation of the South Sea Bubble, which brought a serious financial crisis to the economy of England and ruined a great deal of people, criminal attacks increased to such a great degree of frequency and brutality that the government was compelled to take increasingly harsh measures for felonies: in 1718 the parliament approved the Transportation Act, also known as the "Jonathan Wild's Act", which became law on 10 May 1719; in 1723 the Black Act intensified the severity of punishments for a greater number of offences, reaching the level of 350 capital crimes.

The Gordon Riots of 1780, occasioned by the Catholic relief bill of 1778, were of the last manifestations of extreme violence in the streets of London: they caused a great deal of property damages, and their suppression resulted in the killing of many demonstrators by military forces. The Old Bailey courthouse was badly attacked, and its furniture damaged and burned. Such excess of violence became abhorrent to the public and marked the desire for less sanguinary punishments.

=== Law enforcement in the 17th and 18th centuries ===
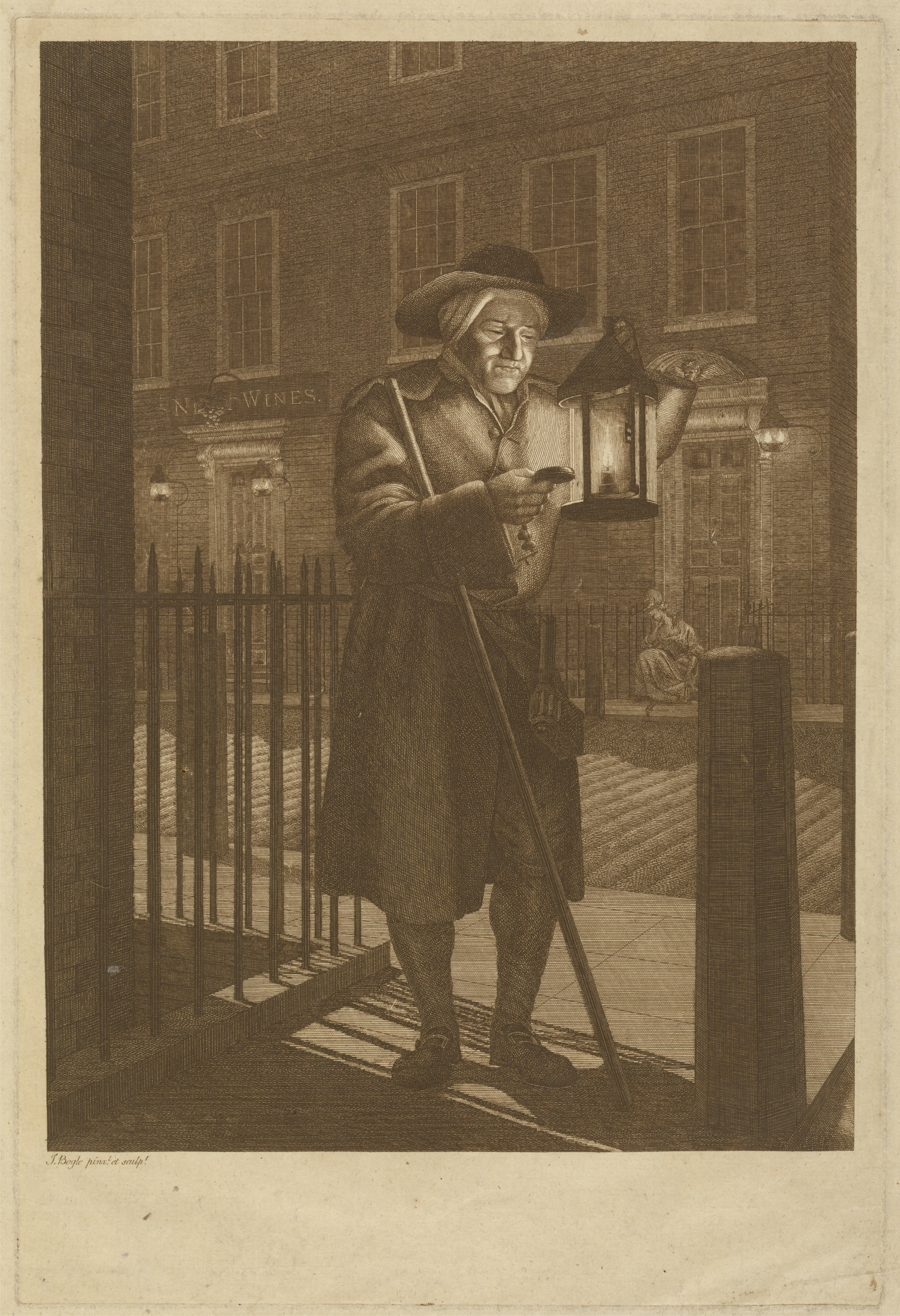
A city of London Watchman drawn and engraved by John Bogle, 1776

In the seventeenth and eighteenth century an official organism for law enforcement did not exist: chasing and arresting serious offenders was not the duty of the public authority. In fact night watchmen, constables and justices of the peace were not obligated to prosecute felons, but played a marginal role: night watchmen only provided surveillance for petty crimes, made rounds at night as a deterrent, and hosted those felons on hold to be brought before a justice of the peace the next day; while constables passively arrested people charged with a crime when already apprehended, and took them before a justice of the peace.

As a consequence, law enforcement was mainly a private matter. Capture, prosecution and provision of evidence for the conviction of serious offenders in trials were at the expense of the victim. Moreover, all individuals were legally expected to report crimes that came to their notice, and answer any call for help – which usually were widely agreed expressions such as: Stop thief!, Murder!, or Fire! – by becoming involved in running after, detecting and catching felons.

During the eighteenth century, the pursuit of criminals involved common people to a lesser extent due to a series of factors. At the end of the seventeenth century population in London was rapidly growing in both area and population thanks to a favorable economic situation, which attracted a great number of immigrants escaping from poor living conditions. In such circumstances it was arduous to spot and find guilty suspects in the capital; and victims were afraid of organized criminals and their violent reprisal. In addition, defendants hardly suffered the consequences of their actions in trials, and felonies were for the most part not even identified. Property was of the biggest concern to inhabitants and public administration, hence theft of any kind was considered a serious crime, along with coining. In the Proceedings of the Old Bailey, theft, except robbery (violent theft), emerges as the type of crime tried the most at the Old Bailey. Prosecuting was expensive and took considerable time, yet it did not ensure the return of the stolen goods to the victim. Consequently, victims started to pay private individuals to conduct investigation and provide evidence for conviction. Likewise public authorities begun to offer rewards to people actively involved in the conviction of felons or the betrayal accomplices. Those men implicated in the catching of thieves for financial purposes were called thief-takers.

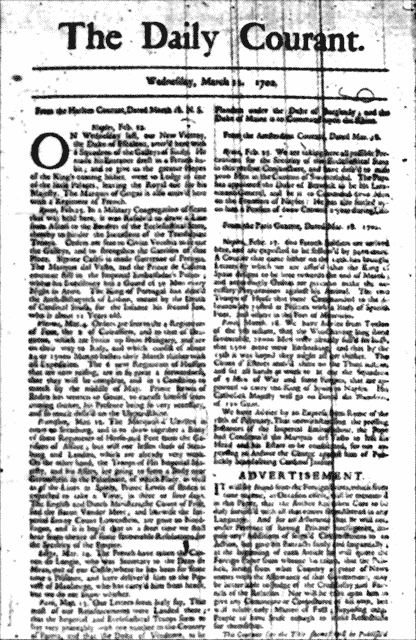
The Daily Courant was the first daily newspaper to be published in the United Kingdom. It was established in 1702, but is no longer in existence. One of the first advertisements that Jonathan Wild put to run his brokering business was on the Daily Courant of 26 May 1714.

=== Newspapers and crime literature ===
A notable fact that contributed to mark the perception of crime in the seventeenth and eighteenth centuries was a booming interest in crime literature. The acts of the capital crimes tried at the Old Bailey were first published in 1674. "The Proceedings of the Old Bailey" were only few pages reporting short summaries of the trials. At the beginning of the eighteenth century part of the original speeches pronounced in trials by prisoners, prosecutors, witnesses and judges started to be printed for the cases thought to be more entertaining for the public; the length was increased, the content reorganised and a space for advertisements created to compete with newspapers in captivating new readers.

Daily newspapers started to be printed more frequently, thus playing an important role for the business of thief-takers. They were used by people to advertise their "lost" goods, offering a reward to induce private individuals to look for and bring back to the owner the belongings that were actually stolen: in fact, prosecuting criminals was difficult and expensive, but it did not ensure the property back. Jonathan Wild took great advantage of the possibility newspapers offered, and managed to increase his profits in the trade of returning the stolen goods by advertising his brokering services in the press; his business grew so profitable that Wild could establish a "lost property office", where people could go and ask for help in finding their missing goods.

== The profession of thief-taking ==
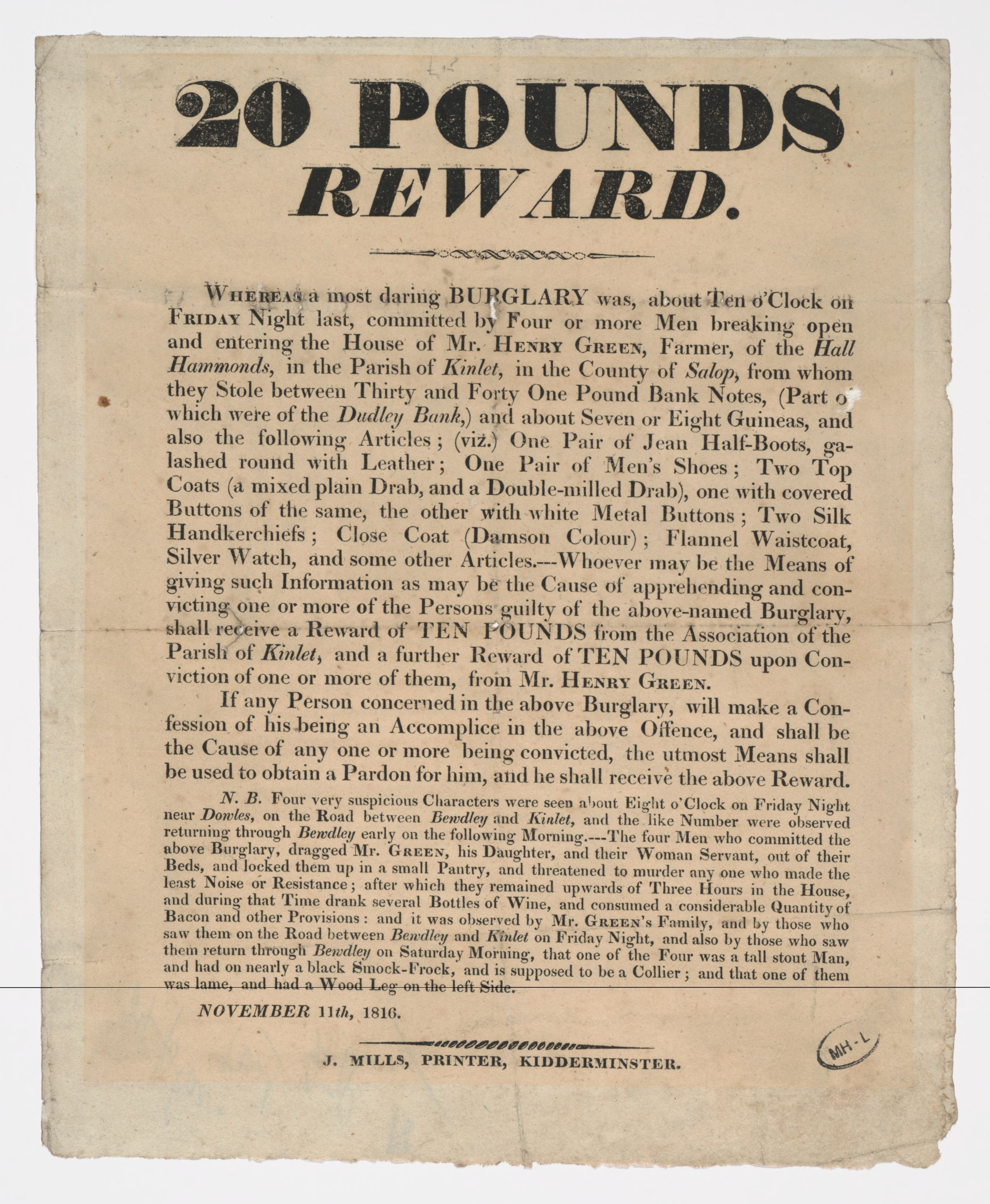
£20 reward offered for information in Kidderminster house burglary, 1816.

There is evidence that thief-takers were active since the late sixteenth century, paid by both private citizens and public authority. The practice of hiring thief-takers continued to grow during the next century keeping pace with the exponential growth of the population and the better economic conditions. The national government started to be more concerned with crime in the 1690s, leading them to draw upon thief-takers to a greater degree, and to introduce permanent rewards, which were meant to encourage citizens to participate more actively in bringing serious criminals to the justice. This behaviour induced several people to start making their living by dedicating to thief catching as a specialized profession.

Several thief-takers were previous criminals who faced the danger of being sentenced to death, but could rescue themselves thanks to the possibility of being pardoned for being instrumental in convicting other defendants, that is to say, for betraying their fellow criminals in trial. Prosecuted felons who managed to save their lives found collaborating with constables and magistrates to be a suitable business, and a safer option than continuing to risk death penalty for committing serious offences. In fact, convicting perpetrators required a substantial degree of expertise in the criminal underworld, which administrations had not and would have paid for. Skilled thief-takers gained considerable power and reputation among their legal and illegal acquaintances: they were able to move at the limits of legality by taking personal advantage of their insight into the criminal world as well as of the crucial role they fulfilled in active policing for the public institutions.

Statutory rewards were not the only factor responsible for the growth and settlement of such a new profession. In addition to this, thief-takers exploited the demand for arranging the return of stolen goods for a fee advertised in newspapers by the victims of theft, who preferred to have their belongings back than to engage in the costly and uncertain prosecution of their attackers. Furthermore, thief-takers were involved in a series of hidden activities that provided them with further sources of income: indeed acting as intermediates among different worlds offered plenty of temptation for corruption. Magistrates were aware of the dark side of thief-takers, but concerns with crime and the rise of criminal gangs, and no official active police force available, were some of the causes that obliged them to suffer thief-takers as effective instruments to reach the conviction of felons and to seal the gap in the judiciary system.

=== Overt and hidden activities ===
Thief-takers met the demand for policing that public authority boosted; they also made their skills known at any chance and took advantage of their public role to gain respectability among citizens. This overt conduct also provided thief-takers with a safe front for illegal activities. In fact, their expertise in the criminal world attracted and satisfied miscellaneous needs, ranging from magistrates to victims, and even to criminals, generating a new series of hidden illegal activities that increased profits and corruption. They were able to handle opposite necessities by acting as intermediary figures, while profiting from a well built set of intricate relationships.

Thief-takers provided services of active policing and law enforcement for a gratuity, and were hired by both private citizens and institutions, which lacked in an organised police force. Thief-takers were usually paid for: revealing crucial information about felons that could lead to their apprehension and prosecution; investigating on felonies; detecting and apprehending criminals; providing instrumental evidence against the accused, which could lead to the conviction and to the desired reward. Thief-takers also worked along with the city officers in searching suspects for the goods stolen, and arresting them. With the Reformation of Manners campaign, new impulse was given to prosecutions, and therefore, to become a thief-taker. Charles Hitchen and Jonathan Wild contributed substantially in increasing the amount of prosecutions of this kind in the 1720s and 1730s.

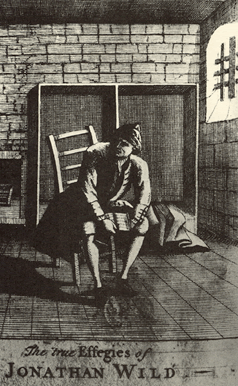
Jonathan Wild sits in Newgate Prison, with his account book on his knees. Wild continued, while in prison, to keep his "list" of goods that came into his office and the money paid for them.

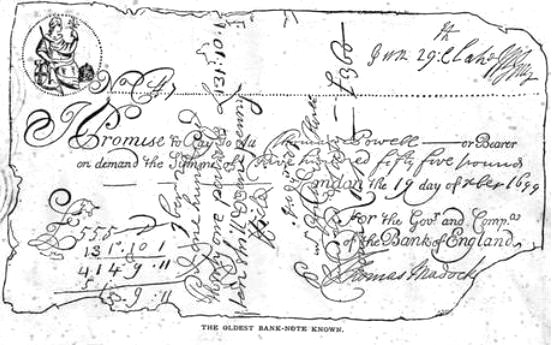
The oldest banknote known issued by the Bank of England of 19 October 1699, value £ 555. If stolen, it would have been a serious loss for the owner.

Thief-takers also offered mediation services between victims and criminals, arranging the return of stolen goods for a fee. The law system had been strengthened, but it did not guarantee the return of stolen goods to the victims in case offenders were convicted: hence, especially for traders, it provoked a loss to their business. Furthermore, in some cases victims were not very willing to prosecute and be responsible for the death of their attackers: first, because death penalty was the only kind of punishment available for felonies, so it was felt to be too harsh sometimes; second, because the victim could undergo public humiliation for the immoral circumstances in which the theft took place. Therefore, they preferred to advertise the "loss" in the newspapers and compound with thieves, than to engage in unworthy prosecutions. This is why many resolved to use the services of an intermediary. On the other side, thieves needed to sell the property they stole. Receivers were thought to be a major cause for the increasing number of thefts: in fact, without receivers, there was no other possibility for thieves to sell the goods they robbed with no questions asked. When dealing with receivers became more dangerous due to more severe punishments for those suspected of compounding a felony, thieves realised that it was less risky and of bigger profit to return what they took unlawfully. This kind of trade was highly implemented by the development of the press: newspapers gave the possibility to victims and mediation figures to advertise their rewards and services, so that they became acquainted with each other.

For these reasons, thief-takers were an important resource to them. Yet thief-takers became notorious to the public because many were corrupt and involved in more serious concealed activities, which put them in a bad light; sometimes they were offensively called "informers". Since negotiating with clients was dangerous as well, because in the case of being perceived as a receiver or to be compounding they could have been accused of felony, Jonathan Wild proved to be prudent in not actually receiving the stolen goods: he only took note on a book of the details of the stolen goods from the victim and left messages to discover where they were, managing to deceive victims into raising the reward to secure the return; or advertised the "loss" on newspapers on behalf of the thieves, and then arranged the exchange. The advantage of this practice was that, in case things went wrong, he could inform about the thieves and get the statutory reward on their conviction.

To gain more profits, thief-takers begun to control and direct criminals, thus converting into thief-makers. They induced people to commit felonies with the objective of later arrest and prosecute them to obtain the reward. Stephen MacDaniel and John Berry prosecuted even innocents to take possession of the reward for the conviction. Other activities included blackmailing felons to extort money for not prosecuting; using them in trials to give testimony against fellow criminals; or protecting criminals for a fee by informing them on unexpected visits of constables or other officers coming to arrest them. Charles Hitchen attempted to extort money even from tavern owners, to prevent them being robbed by criminals, but he was badly beaten, and renounced.

=== Earnings and other benefits ===
Thief-takers could count on several types of income and advantages from their legal and illegal activities, which allowed them to establish a lucrative business:

- Private rewards: victims promised financial rewards to those who were able to catch criminals and lead to their conviction. They also advertised their stolen goods as "lost" in newspapers offering to pay a sum of money to those who could find and bring their belongings back.
- Public rewards: Before the introduction of statutory rewards, thief-takers claimed from public officers the reimburse for the operational costs incurred. Furthermore, a £10.00 reward started to be paid for information leading to a conviction.
  - Statutory rewards: in the 1690s the state introduced exemptions and permanent financial rewards to encourage the prosecution of felons, which were given in case of conviction. During the following years their amount was to be raised due to an increasing concern with crime and moral issues:
    - 1692: £40.00 for the conviction of highwaymen.
    - 1695: £40.00 for the conviction of coiners and clippers.
    - 1699: Tyburn Ticket for the conviction of burglars (later converted in a financial reward), horse-thieves and shoplifters. It consisted in the exemption from parish duties, such as serving as a constable or a watchman.
    - 1706: £40.00 for the conviction of burglars and house breakers.
    - 1720: £100.00 extra were offered in addition to the £40.00 already paid for the conviction of serious offenders.
- Authority's Protection: public authority safeguarded thief-takers as important instruments for the law enforcement of the capital. Thief-takers had in fact an ill reputation because of their actively prosecuting felons for profit, and were sometimes called with the condemnatory expression of "informers".
- Royal Pardon: granted to felons in case they served authority with notice about fellow criminals that led to their conviction. Some defendants took advantage of this possibility and converted to thief-taking.
- Protection fee: a monetary recompense thief-takers received from those criminals they agreed not to prosecute.
- Extortion money: in some cases thief-takers blackmailed criminals and forced them to pay a sum of money to avoid prosecution.

== Public attitude toward thief-takers ==
The public opinion reflected changing attitudes toward thief-takers' activities and methods. For the authorities, thief-takers played a dual role: they were extremely important for apprehending felons, but at the same time a negative influence on the whole process of enforcing the law. For criminals, thief-takers were useful for protection as well as arrangement of the return of stolen goods to the victim to obtain the advertised reward, which was a better bargain than dealing with receivers. This is one reason why thief-takers had a great knowledge of criminal networks. The dark side was that the supposed protectors had the information and power to blackmail felons to extort money, or to prosecute them for the reward, which they actually did to sustain their own credibility to the authority. For private citizens, thief-takers played a valuable role in managing to return the stolen goods for a fee, by negotiating or prosecuting the thief. This is why they were not perceived so negatively as informers were. But the news of misconduct provoked the rage of the public.

Their dubious behaviour reached public attention also because of the rivalry between the two leading thief-takers: Charles Hitchen and Jonathan Wild. Hitchen became irritated by the great success of Wild, his former assistant, who took advantage from Hitchen's suspension from the place of Under City-Marshall to engage in more lucrative illegal activities. In 1718 Charles Hitchen resolved to write a pamphlet against the practice of thief-taking called: A True Discovery of the Conduct of Receivers and Thief-Takers, In and About the City of London: To the Multiplication and Encouragement of Thieves, Housebreakers, and other loose and disorderly Persons. In his pamphlet Hitchen denounces the ill practices of thief-takers, but the actual unspoken target was the very Jonathan Wild, whom he nicknames "The Regulator". Wild in turn replied anonymously rejecting the accusations and revealing particulars of Hitchen's own dubious past as a receiver and as a thief-taker, thus beginning a pamphlet war.

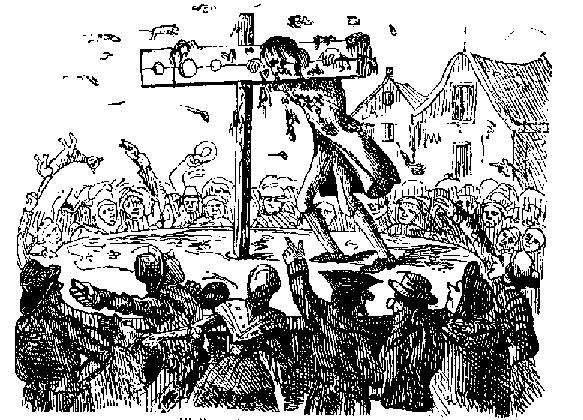
18th century illustration of perjurer John Waller pilloried and pelted to death in 1732

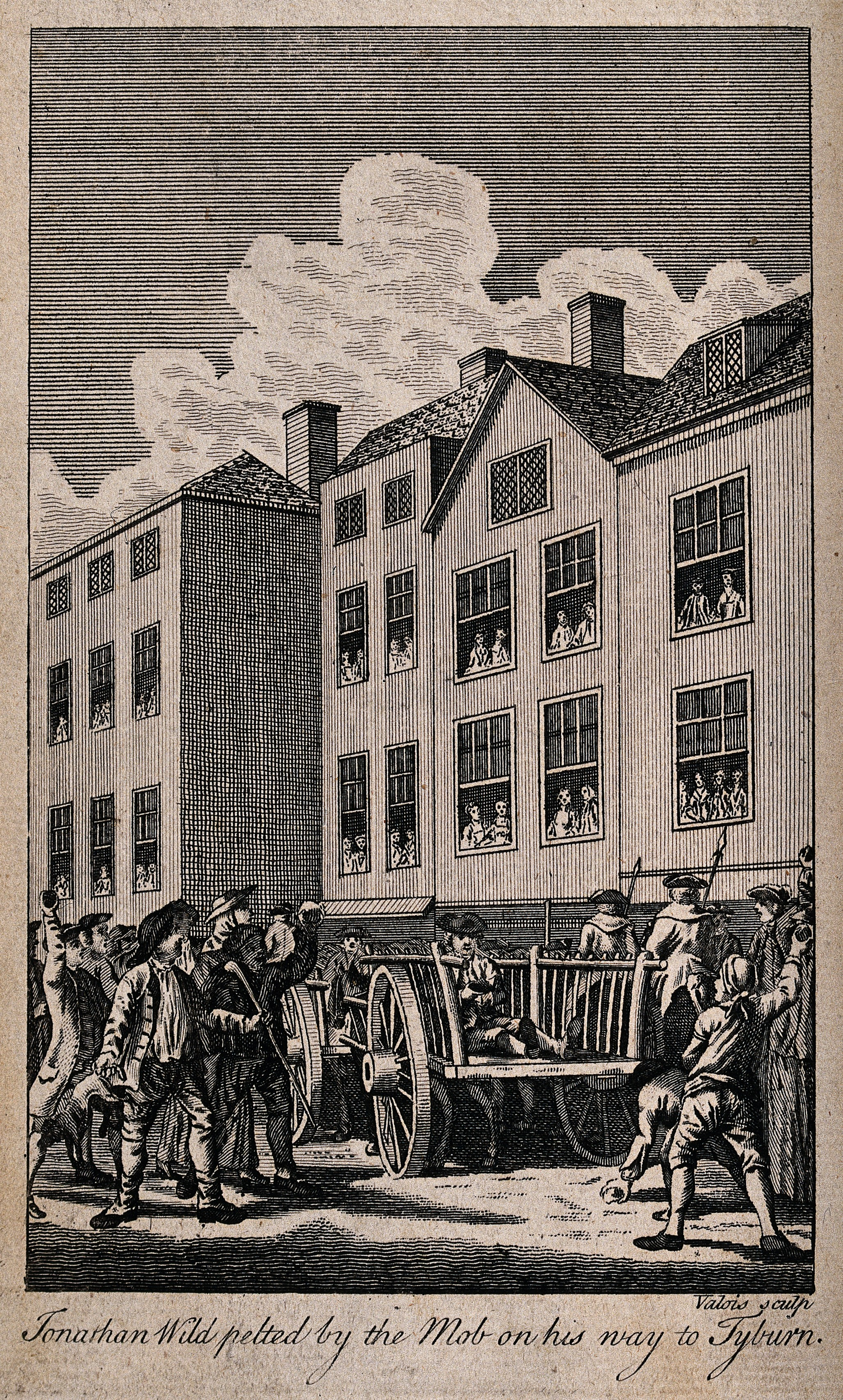
Jonathan Wild, the thief-taker, sitting on a cart, is pelted by the mob on his way to Tyburn.

After the infamous cases of Charles Hitchen and Jonathan Wild, more bad light was cast upon the reputation of thief-takers when the MacDaniel affair was discovered. Corruption, extortion of money and the practice of convicting innocents for profit, or popular gentlemen highwaymen such as the famous Jack Sheppard, turned public opinion against thief-takers. This is evident when several thief catchers happened to be tried at the Old Bailey and given the punishment of being exposed in the pillory. During the exposure, the mob beat them, sometimes even to death.

Hitchen was sentenced to an hour of exposure in the pillory for attempted sodomy, but after half an hour he had to be rescued from the savage reaction of the public because his life was in danger. MacDaniel and his accomplices were so brutally attacked that the constables tried to rescue them before they were killed, but one of the gang was already dead because a stone crushed his head. The others were severely wounded, and two of them, including MacDaniel, died in prison for the absence of prompt medical treatment. Wild as well suffered the rage of the Londoners on his way to the place of execution: he was fiercely pelted with stones and repeatedly insulted by the mob, who rushed furiously to Newgate Prison and followed him while transported with an open cart to the gallows.

== Mention in the Proceedings of the Old Bailey ==
"The Old Bailey, Known Also as the Central Criminal Court"

In the records of the Proceedings of the Old Bailey there is no manifest presence of thief-takers. Thief-takers were habitué at the Central Court of London and participated to a consistent number of trials under multiple roles, but they are difficult to track down because they avoided to appear under the label of "thief-taker". Prisoners in fact attempted to save their lives by sometimes accusing prosecutors of being thief-takers. After the execution of Jonathan Wild, some defendants also begun to claim that they had been induced into committing a felony, thus exploiting the increasing unpopularity of thief-takers' activities in order to discredit the charge. In trials, thief-takers filled several roles:

- prosecutor: thief-takers are difficult to find in cases of highway robbery, burglary or horse theft.
- witness: thief-takers seldom appear as witnesses in trials of theft, but more frequently in those of coining, for which they were essential for providing effective evidence against the accused felons.
- victim: they could fake to be the victim of a theft. The MacDaniel gang specialised in this business. In order to gain the reward of the prosecution, they persuaded young inexperienced thieves to commit a theft on a member of the gang, while the other members hurried at the hue and cry to apprehend the thief. They also accused innocent people: perfect strangers that witnessed a theft came to help the supposed victim, who in reality was a member of the gang; in a second moment, thanks to the involvement of a corrupt constable, the charge of theft was shifted to the passer-by.
- defendant: authorities knew thief-takers were acting at the limits of legality, and attempted to prosecute them when possible. Jonathan Wild was tried for theft and perverting justice, but acquitted of the first charge and sentenced to death for the second. The MacDaniel gang was tried for perverting justice and sentenced to pay a fine, be exposed twice in the pillory, undergo seven years of imprisonment, and find someone who could guarantee that they maintained a good behaviour during the three years after their imprisonment. Charles Hitchen was tried for sodomy and assault with sodomitical intent: he was acquitted of the first and found guilty of the second. He was punished with a fine, and imprisonment after being exposed in the pillory.

== A polished image: the Bow Street Runners ==
Thief takers played an important role in the development of the modern police force. After the execution of Wild, the Thief-Taker General and corrupt criminal, a void in law enforcement emerged, and public officers nearly repented his death: the number of apprehensions, prosecutions and hangings had decreased significantly, as well as the readiness for the retrieval of the stolen goods. Despite the increasing unpopularity of thief-takers, whether it was for the dubious methods of Wild, or the scandal generated by the criminal gang of MacDaniel, rewards continued to be paid to stimulate thief-taking, thus validating those figures involved in active policing. Thief-takers were essential to the authorities for an effective and efficient law enforcement. By force of the adverse circumstances, it was an arduous task for the public authority to detect, apprehend and prosecute felons all alone.

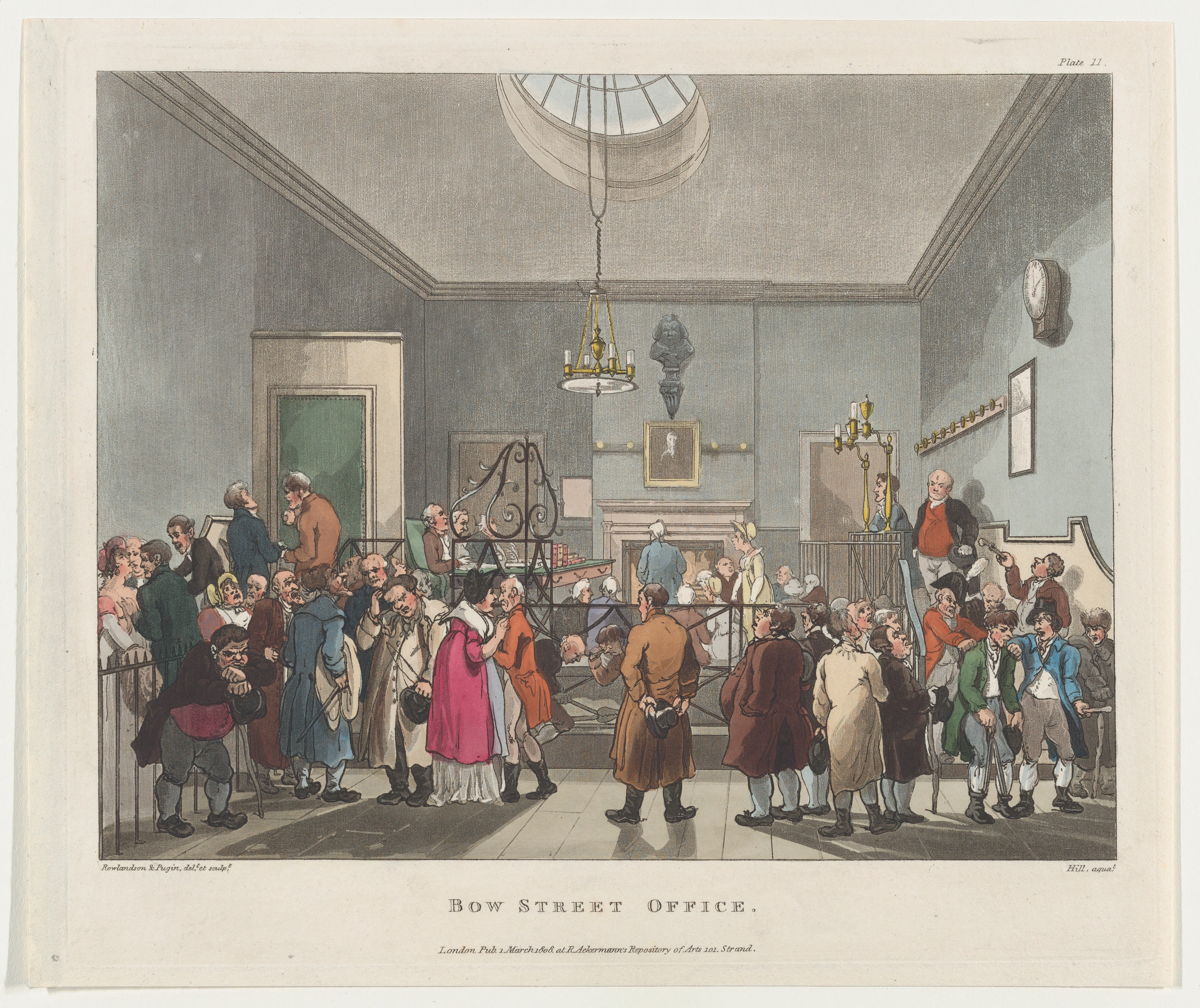
Bow Street Magistrate's Courtroom at 4 Bow Street, in London. The Bow Street Runners were London's first professional police force.

In 1751 the novelist Henry Fielding wrote a pamphlet entitled Enquiry into the Causes of the late Increase of Robbers, in which he tries to restore the good image of thief-takers, showing how valuable they were for law enforcement and how dangerous for their life it was to secure criminals to the justice: the ill behaviour of a few did not have to erase the laudable services they performed for the community. Henry and his half-brother John also established a primitive form of organised police force: they hired thief-takers and former constables to go from their magistrate's office in Bow Street and investigate, catch criminals or recover stolen goods. At the beginning the payment was in rewards, but later these men also received a weekly wage of a guinea. To keep distance from the negative opinion of thief-takers, he also decided to give a new name to those under his service, that is Runners. At the beginning the public was not very willing to this new organisation of law enforcement because the ill practices of thief-takers were not forgotten yet, and it meant also moving a step closer to the establishment of a professional form of policing as in France. The English feared a change in the direction of the French law enforcement system, because the French law was perceived as too intrusive: a loss of the traditional liberties the English were proud of was unacceptable for many.

The Bow Street Runners reached quickly the public awareness and approval thanks to the success in defeating a notorious gang of robbers in 1753, and to the massive advertisements published by John Fielding in the newspapers. Sir John Fielding managed to create a standing group of Runners, and to introduce improvements in the policing system. For example, he proposed more rules to control receivers and pawnbrokers, the creation of a policing group that could move with horses to be quicker in the pursuit of criminals, and the sharing of information among the several parts of the country, so that criminals would not have escaped prosecution so easily.

== Notable thief-takers ==
Jonathan Wild is perhaps the most notorious thief-taker. He operated in London and by the 1720s, was a famous and popular figure. However, he actually led a gang of thieves; he would arrange the return of property stolen by his own underlings. To keep up the belief that he was working legitimately, he would even hand over members of his gang, who would inevitably end up being hanged at the Tyburn Tree. When this was discovered, he himself was hanged for theft in 1725. Wild was a buckle-maker from Wolverhampton who decided to move to London. There he indebted and was imprisoned. While in prison, he developed acquaintances with officers and criminals. He then became Charles Hitchen's assistant and learned the business of arranging the return of stolen goods. Taking advantage of his master's suspension from the office of under-marshal, he advertised his own Lost Property Office and extended the business to a wider range of illegalities by starting to deal with serious offenders. To make the trade more lucrative he became a thief-maker, so that he could control almost all the criminal network and the business of stolen goods. His criminal activity included compounding, blackmailing thieves to extort money for not prosecuting, and sometimes prosecuting some of them to obtain the statutory reward and maintain credibility among the authorities.

Charles Hitchen was a former craftsman of wooden furniture who exploited his wife's estate to buy the position of under-marshal of the city of London in 1712. This office was a vehicle to engage in more lucrative criminal activities under the protection of a respectable role. In addition to thief-taking, he could improve the trade of stolen goods by making use of his authority: he intimidated young thieves in order to force them to deliver the stolen property to him; in a second moment he tracked down the owner and tried to oblige the owner to pay a reward to have the stolen property back. Despite complaints about his belligerent methods, he managed to maintain his position because he alleged that he was able to reduce the increased wave of crime generated by the end of the War of the Spanish Succession. Hitchen was only suspended for a short period of time, during which his assistant Jonathan Wild took advantage of his master's absence to go beyond the mediation practiced by Hitchen and expand to a wider range of more serious illegal activities. The competition between Hitchen and Wild generated a "pamphlet war": Hitchen wrote a pamphlet called: A True Discovery of the Conduct of Receivers and Thief-Takers in and about the City of London in which he denounced the practices of thief-takers, but Wild was the main unspoken target. Wild replied in the same way, accusing Hitchen of abusing of his office to make a trade of stolen goods and revealing Hitchen's participation in sexual activity with other men. Hitchen in turn wrote another pamphlet, entitled The Regulator, or, A Discovery of the Thieves, Thief-Takers and Locks, in an attempt to discredit Wild and, in this way, his accusations. However, under the influence of the moralistic campaign of the Societies for the Reformation of Manners, he was tried in 1727 for sodomy, which was a felony, but found guilty only of assault with sodomitical intent and sentenced to pay a fine, be exposed in the pillory, and be imprisoned for six months. He was also discharged from his place of under-marshal for not complying with his job's functions.

Stephen MacDaniel was a craftsman who made knives for a living, an officer at Marshalsea Prison, and a public house keeper. He was a brutal armed man who became thief-taker after escaping the gallows for betraying his fellow criminals. He used to work in a gang, and together they organised traps to falsely incriminate innocents in order to gain the statutory reward from their convictions. MacDaniel and his gang were finally discovered thanks to the evidence given by one of the gang and tried at the Old Bailey; they were sentenced to pay a fine, be exposed in the pillory, be imprisoned for seven years and prove themselves to be well behaving during the three years after their imprisonments. MacDaniel survived the pillory because he was rescued before being killed, but two members of the gang who were also pilloried died from serious injury-related wounds.

John Whitwood was hired by public officers to investigate, seek and arrest criminals, sometimes with the help of other fellows. He was also a receiver of stolen goods into the trade of returning them to the victim to gain the reward, organised thefts, and blackmailed the thieves whom he dealt with in order to make more profit.

Anthony St Leger was a young housebreaker, robber and burglar who became a thief-taker after being pardoned in trial for giving evidence against the rest of the gang. He took advantage of his knowledge and experience in the criminal underworld to start making money with rewards or extortions for not prosecuting.

Anthony Dunn was a highwayman and burglar who operated in a gang. He escaped the gallows by obtaining the royal pardon as well as a reward for being instrumental to the conviction of his fellow criminals. After this, he decided to become thief-taker: he started to work together with St Leger in the lucrative prosecution of coiners, clippers, and highway robbers.

James Jenkins was a jeweller and an active thief-taker who was dedicated mainly to restoring morality under the influence of the Reformation of Manners Campaign. For this reason he happened to be attacked and insulted with the negative label of "informer". He appeared in cases of larceny, rape, clipping, and coining, together with his associate Rewse.

Bodenham Rewse was an embroiderer and very active thief-taker in prosecuting promiscuous women for the Societies for the Reformation of Manners. He became also involved in the prosecution of highwaymen and plotters. He collaborated with the warden of the Mint in the pursuit of coiners, clippers, and counterfeiters, especially together with Saker. With the profits made with the rewards he managed to buy the position of head turnkey of Newgate Prison.

Robert Saker was a thief-taker of coiners and clippers in particular. He worked in collaboration with other thief-takers such as Dunn and Rewse, with the constable John Hooke, and even with his wife, Mary Miller, in setting traps for the apprehension of criminals.

John Connell was a thief-taker who operated together with his wife Mary in the business of prosecuting for profit. They engaged in pursuing highwaymen, coiners and clippers, but were also corrupt and blackmailed felons to extort money.

John Gibbons owned an official position for the government and took advantage of his role to become a corrupt thief-taker: he pretended to pursue coiners and clippers, but he actually protected them from being prosecuted in exchange for money.

== See also ==
- Charles Hitchen, one of Wild's rivals
- Bow Street Runners, London's first professional police organization, founded in 1749
- Bounty hunter
- Privateer
- List of obsolete occupations
