= Society for the Reformation of Manners =

Conservative group in London, England during the 17th century

Society for Reformation of Manners
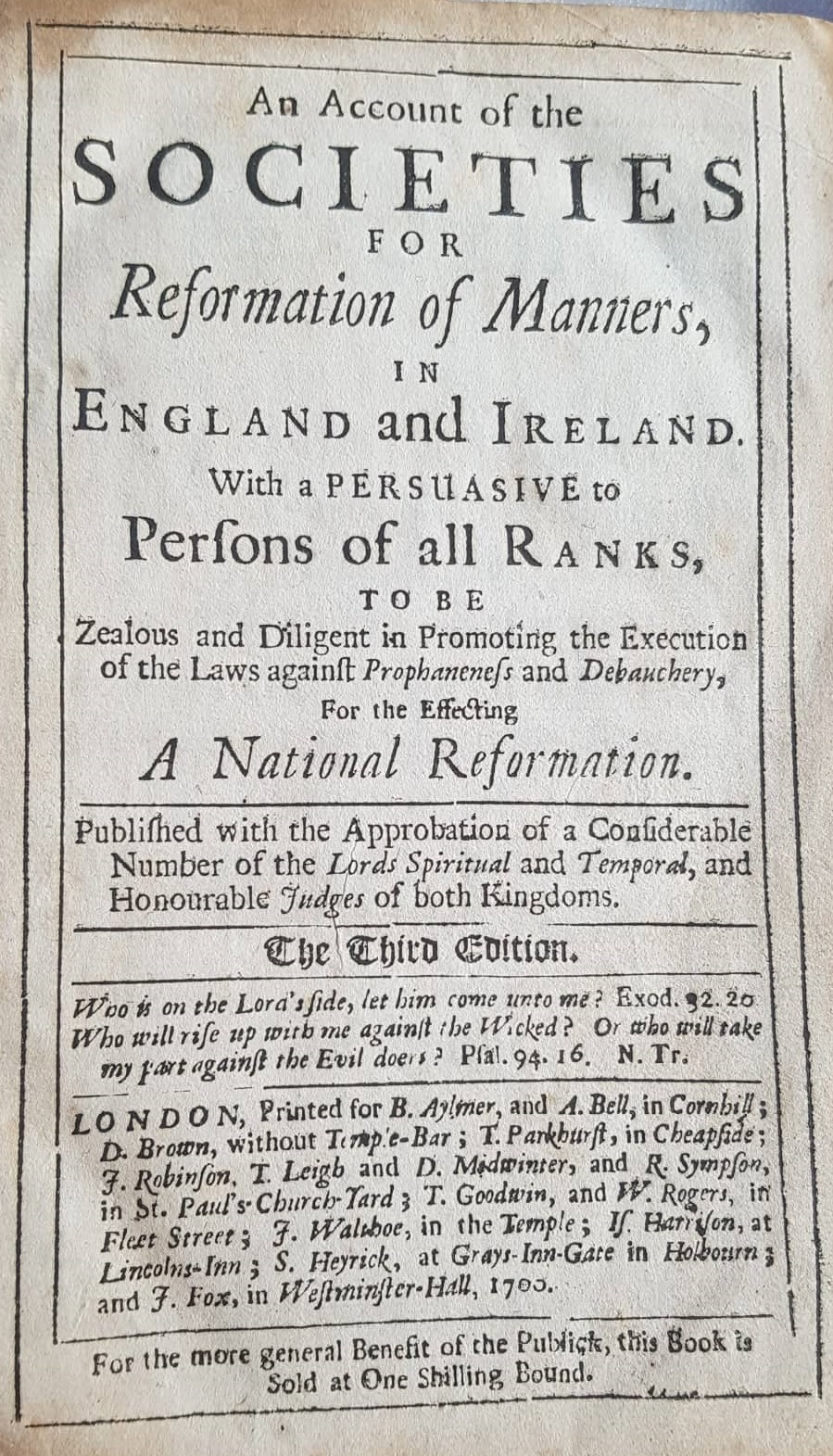
- An account of the Societies for Reformation of Manners, 1700.
- Formation: 1691
- Founded at: London
- Type: Moral reform
- Purpose: Suppression of prostitution
- Region served: Great Britain

The Society for the Reformation of Manners was founded in the Tower Hamlets area of London in 1691. Its aims were the suppression of profanity, immorality, and other lewd activities in general, and of brothels and prostitution in particular. The society flourished until the 1730s and was briefly revived during 1757.

== History ==
It was one of many similar societies founded in that period, it reflected a sea-change in the social attitudes in England following the Glorious Revolution of 1688, and a shifting from the socially liberal attitudes of the Restoration period under Charles II and James II to a more moral and censorious attitude of respectability and seriousness under William III and Mary II. Although inspired and fed by the moral excesses of London, branches were set up in towns and cities as far afield as Edinburgh, where Daniel Defoe was a member, though the societies never flourished in rural areas.

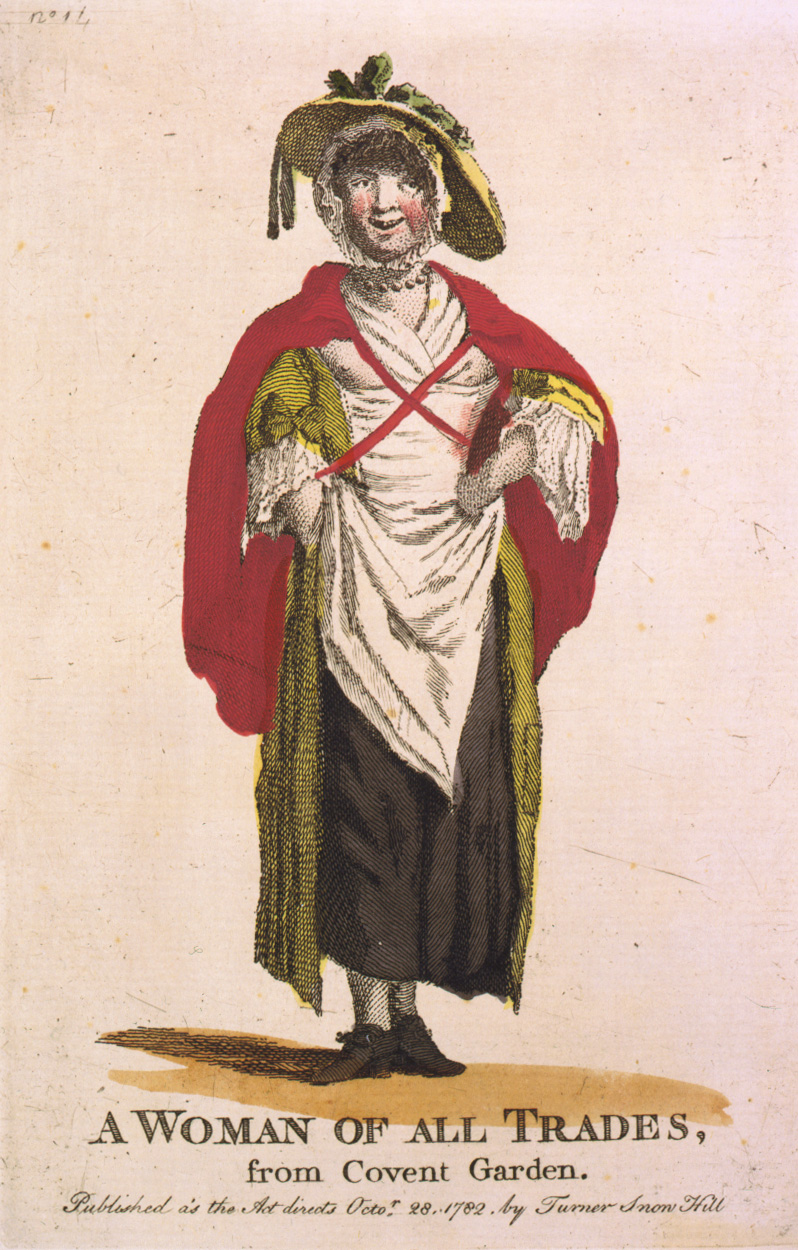
"A woman of all trades from Covent Garden". The caption on this engraving is a euphemism for a prostitute

The society was arranged in four tiers, with the "Society of Original Gentlemen" at the top. These eminent professionals (lawyers, judges and MPs) along with the original founders, provided the expertise and financing to enable prosecutions to proceed. The next tier was the "Second Society" which consisted mainly of tradesmen, and whose role it was to suppress vice. Among other methods, the "Second Society" employed a blacklist which they published annually to shame the alleged offenders. Below the tradesmen was the "Association of Constables" who took a more active role in arresting the miscreants who offended the public morality. Finally the fourth layer consisted of informers: a network of "moral guardians" throughout the City of London, with two stewards in each parish, to gather information about moral infractions. The central committee of "Original Gentlemen" collected the information with a view to passing the information to the local magistrates, so the malefactors could be prosecuted and punished. The society would pay others to bring prosecutions, or bring prosecutions on its own account.

A prominent supporter of the society was John Gonson, Justice of the Peace and Chairman of the Quarter Sessions for the City of Westminster for 50 years in the early 18th century. He was noted for his enthusiasm for raiding brothels and for passing harsh sentences, and was depicted twice in William Hogarth's A Harlot's Progress series of paintings and engravings. In around 1770, the society denounced Covent Garden as:

...the great square of VENUS, and its purlieus are crowded with the practitioners of this Goddess. One would imagine that all the prostitutes in the Kingdom had decided on this neighbourhood...

The society sought and gained the patronage of both Church and Crown: John Tillotson, the Archbishop of Canterbury between 1691 and 1694 actively encouraged the society and his successor Thomas Tenison commended them to his bishops, while Queens Mary and Anne both issued Proclamations against Vice at the society's urging. The society also had influence within the House of Lords, demonstrated by a declaration of support signed by 36 of the members. While there were undoubtedly MPs that shared the society's viewpoint and some which were members, there was little relevant legislation passed during the period of the society's activities and the society paid little attention to the House of Commons. Jonathan Swift was an early critic of the societies, arguing in his tract A Project for the Advancement of Religion, and the Reformation of Manners (1709), that while the project began with excellent intentions, it had grown into a means of enriching corrupt informers.

The society also brought lawsuits against playwrights whose plays were perceived to contain insufficient moral instruction. The new attitude to the theatre may be judged from the anti-theatre pamphlet Short View of the Immorality and Profaneness of the English Stage by Jeremy Collier, from 1698, who attacked the lack of moral instruction contained in contemporary plays, such as Love For Love (1695) by William Congreve and The Relapse (1696) by John Vanbrugh, signalling the end of the popularity of Restoration comedy.

The society flourished until the 1730s, with 1,363 prosecutions in 1726–7. There was a series of raids on "molly houses" in 1725. One prominent victim of the society was Charles Hitchen, a "thief-taker" and Under City Marshal. He acted as a "finder" of stolen merchandise, negotiating a fee for the return of the stolen items, while extorting bribes from pickpockets to prevent arrest, and leaning on the thieves to make them fence their stolen goods through him. His business may have been undermined by the success of his competitor Jonathan Wild. In 1727, Hitchen was accused of sodomitical practices, and tried for sodomy (a capital offence) and attempted sodomy. He was sentenced to a fine of 20 pounds, to be put in the pillory for one hour, and then to serve six months in prison. He was badly beaten while in the pillory, and died soon after being released from prison.

== Revival ==
The society was revived for a period in 1757, and was recognised by George II. A later successor was William Wilberforce's Society for the Suppression of Vice, founded following a royal proclamation by George III in 1787, "For the Encouragement of Piety and Virtue, and for the Preventing and Punishing of Vice, Profaneness and Immorality".

== Bibliography ==
- Anonymous, A Proposal for a National Reformation of Manners, John Dunton, London 1694.
- T. C. Curtis & W. A. Speck, The Societies for the Reformation of Manners: A Case Study in the Theory and Practice of Moral Reform, "Literature and History", III 1976, pp. 45–64.
- Burford, E. J. (1986). Wits, Wenchers and Wantons - London's Low Life: Covent Garden in the Eighteenth Century. Hale. p. 260. ISBN 0709026293.
- Hunt, Alan (1999). Governing Morals: A Social History of Moral Regulation. Cambridge University Press. pp. 272. ISBN 0521646898.
- Clegg, Jeanne, Perseguitati/persecutori: dissenzienti, delatori e movimento per la riforma del costume, in: Marina Formica & Alberto Postigliola (eds.), Diversità e minoranze nel Settecento, Rome: Edizioni di storia e letteratura, 2006, pp. 79–86. ISBN 9788884983404.
