= Macdaniel affair =

1754 political scandal

Illustration of Stephen Macdaniel

The Macdaniel affair or Macdaniel scandal was a political scandal in the United Kingdom. In 1754, a group of bounty hunters, led by Stephen MacDaniel, were revealed to have been prosecuting innocent men to their deaths in England in order to collect reward money from bounties.

The scandal was an unintended consequence of the British government offering rewards for the capture of criminals, as before those rewards were instituted, thief-takers depended primarily on privately funded rewards from victims seeking return of stolen property or other restitution. The Macdaniel affair formed part of the impetus for the formation of salaried public police forces, who did not depend on rewards, to combat crime in the country.
