= The Life and Death of Jonathan Wild, the Great =

1743 satiric novel by Henry Fielding

The Life and The Death of the Late Mr. Jonathan Wild, the Great.
- Author: Henry Fielding
- Language: English
- Genre: Satire
- Publication date: 1743
- Publication place: England
- Media type: Printed
- Preceded by: Joseph Andrews (1742)
- Followed by: Tom Jones (1749)

The Life and Death of the Late Jonathan Wild, the Great is a satiric novel by Henry Fielding. It was published in 1743 in Fielding's Miscellanies, third volume. It is a satiric account of the life of London underworld boss Jonathan Wild (1682–1725). It is an experiment in the various narrative genres that were popular at the time: serious history, criminal biography, political satire, and picaresque novel. Some have argued that it is mainly a satire on Britain's first Prime Minister Robert Walpole, who was continuously charged by his political enemies with allegations of corruption.

== Plot summary ==
The book tells the satiric biographical story of an early 18th-century underworld boss, Jonathan Wild, from his birth in 1682 until his execution in 1725. As a thief-taker, Wild's job was to capture criminals and take them to the authorities in order to collect a reward, but he made notorious profit from managing an underground network of malefactors who paid him to avoid being denounced. Fielding's biography of Jonathan Wild allows him to satirize various aspects of English society at the time. It features an interpolated romantic story that is nowhere to be found in other accounts of the historical Wild. It has been argued that this was Fielding's way of rendering the criminal biography of Wild into a novel of the kind that was becoming increasingly popular in his time.
