= Moll King (criminal) =

17th-century London criminal

- Born: 1670s
- Other names: Mary Gilstone, Moll Bird, Mary Godson
- Criminal charge: Pickpocketing
- Penalty: Death (commuted); Transportation to America

Moll King was a 17th-century London criminal.

== Biography ==
Little is known of King's early life. She was probably a native Londoner and born in the 1670s. In October 1693 she had one of her hands branded after robbing a house in St Giles, Cripplegate. It is thought she married a city officer in 1718.

King went into business with infamous London criminal Jonathan Wild, from whom she learned pick-pocketing. In October 1718, King, now using the name Mary Gilstone, was arrested for stealing a gold watch from a woman near St Anne's Church, Soho. She was sentenced to death in December 1718. This was commuted to fourteen years' transportation to America when it was confirmed by a 'Panel of Matrons' that she was pregnant.

After her baby was weaned, King was transported on the convict ship Susannah and Sarah, to Annapolis, Maryland, arriving on 23 April 1720, but within a short time had returned to England. It is assumed that King's connection with Jonathan Wild facilitated her release. In Annapolis, King had teamed up with fellow felon Richard Bird, originally from Whitechapel, and the pair travelled back to England together, King using the name Bird.

In June 1721, King was arrested robbing a house in Little Russell Street, Covent Garden and incarcerated in Newgate Prison. The legal documents from this case refer to King, alias Moll Bird, alias Mary Godson. Jonathan Wild was able to use his influence with "tame" magistrates for the charges to be dropped. A second indictment for returning from transportation was added. In January 1722, King was again transported to America, this time on the ship Gilbert.

By June 1722, she was back in London. In September 1722, she was arrested and returned to Newgate. In June 1723, she was again transported to America.

In 1723, a man named John Stanley was hanged for murdering his mistress. According to a pamphlet which was published after Stanley's death, he had allegedly been intimate with Moll King as well.

In 1734, King was allegedly sentenced to transportation to America a final time.

== Moll Flanders ==
Historical analyst Gerald Howson argues in his 1985 book, Thief-Taker General: Jonathan Wild and the Emergence of Crime and Corruption As a Way of Life in Eighteenth-Century England, that Moll Kings' story had inspired Daniel Defoe to write his novel, Moll Flanders.

While King was imprisoned at Newgate in 1721, novelist Daniel Defoe began writing about her. Defoe was visiting his friend, the journalist Nathaniel Mist, when he began mentioning Moll King in his notes.

== Bibliography ==
- Cruickshank, Dan (2010). London's Sinful Secret: The Bawdy History and Very Public Passions of London's Georgian Age. St. Martin's Publishing Group. ISBN 978-1-4299-1956-2.
- Howson, Gerald (1985). Thief-Taker General: Jonathan Wild and the Emergence of Crime and Corruption As a Way of Life in Eighteenth-Century England. Transaction Publishers. ISBN 978-1-4128-3988-4.
- Rees, Sian (2012). Moll: The Life and Times of Moll Flanders. Pimlico. ISBN 978-1-84595-193-1.
- Defoe, Daniel (2005). Scanlon, Paul A. (ed.). Moll Flanders. Broadview Press. ISBN 978-1-55111-451-4.
- Defoe, Daniel (1998). Starr, George A. (ed.). The Fortunes and Misfortunes of the Famous Moll Flanders. Oxford University Press. ISBN 978-0-19-283403-4.
