= Charles Hitchen =

English criminal & thief-taker of the City of London (c. 1675 – 1727)

- Born: 1675; Wolverhampton, Staffordshire, England
- Died: 1727 (aged 51–52); St Paul's Cathedral, City of London, London, England
- Occupations: cabinet maker, joiner, city marshal, extortionist, fence, thief-taker
- Known for: He was one of the first thief-takers in London and chief rival of Jonathan Wild.

Charles Hitchen (c. 1675 – 1727), also mentioned as Charles Hitchin in other sources, was an English thief-taker and under-marshal of the City of London in the early 18th century, also, famously tried for homosexual acts and sodomy offences. Alongside his former assistant and then a major rival Jonathan Wild, against whom he later published a pamphlet (The Regulator) and contributed to his sentencing to death, Hitchen blackmailed and bribed people and establishments irrespective of their reputation, suspicious or respectable. Despite the disgrace of the people he earned through his abusive exercising of his power, he remained in power and continued fighting against violent crime, especially after the ending of the war of the Spanish Succession and until 1727.

Widely known for his homosexual activities and considerably nicknamed as Madam or Your Ladyship, Hitchen publicly condemned this crime and even raided so called Molly houses being a member of Societies for the Reformation of Manners. However, largely due to his inaccuracy and growing contempt of people he himself appeared the subject of the Justice and was fined, pilloried and imprisoned, dying very soon after leaving Newgate.

== Early life ==
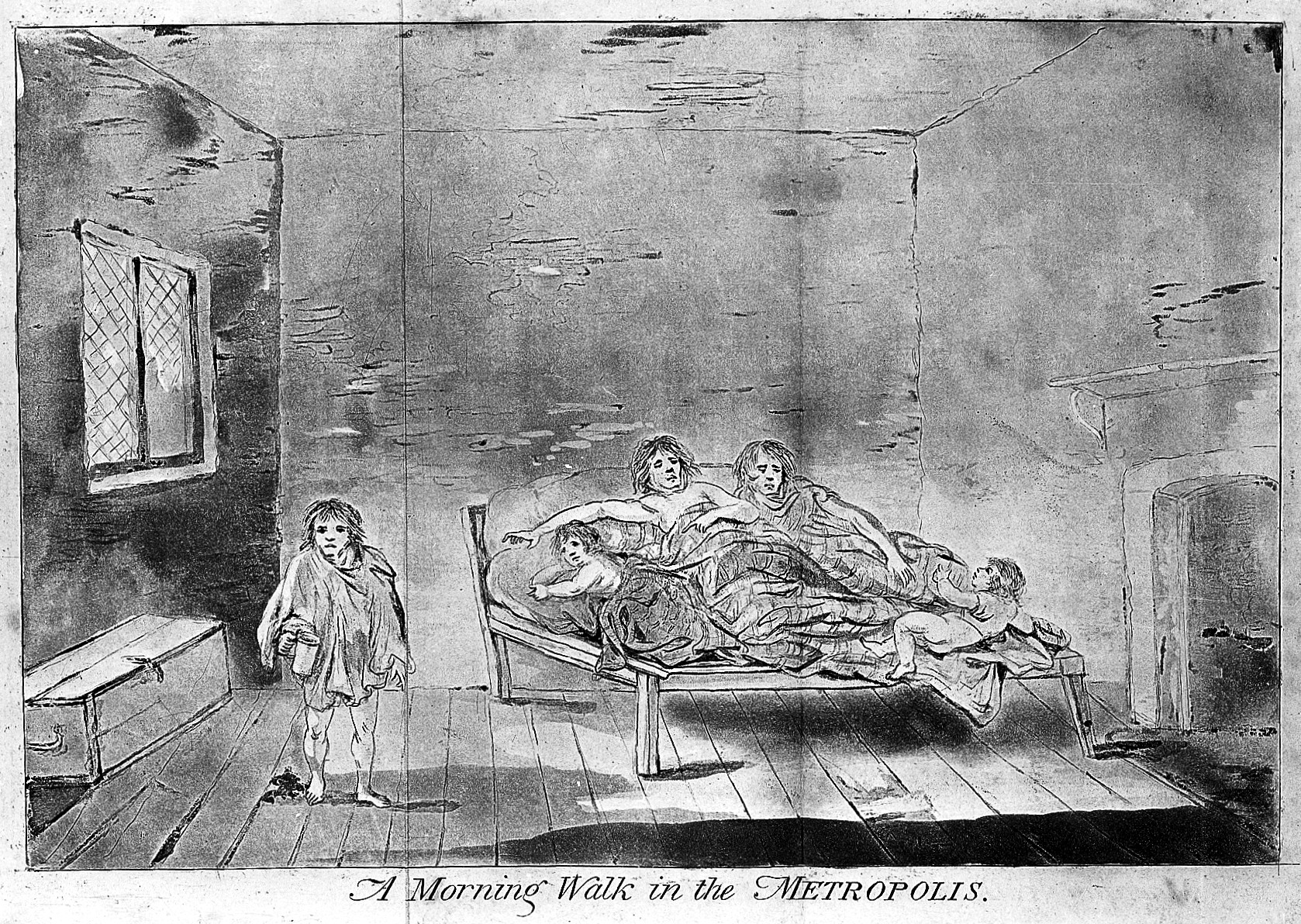

Charles Hitchen was born in poverty to a family in Wolverhampton, Staffordshire, presumably in about 1675. He was apprenticed as a cabinet maker before he married Elizabeth, the daughter of one John Wells of King's Walden, Hertfordshire, in 1703. Shortly, he set up trade as a joiner for a time and the couple moved to live on the north side of St. Paul's Churchyard in the City of London. They must have had at least one child as Hitchen mentioned his "family" though other than that nothing is known about them. In 1711, John Wells died and left his property to his two daughters to be equally divided between two of them. Not long after, Hitchen persuaded his wife to sell all her inheritance to invest in a very profitable business as he foresaw it and on 8 January 1712, with his wife's proceeds he purchased the office of City under-marshal for £700.

== The city marshals and their men ==
In 1570s, the Court of Aldermen introduced the "provost marshals" when the haphazard police force could not control the city's large population of beggars. In the 17th century, they acquired a regular salaried status, with duties very much like of those of constables, beadles and watchmen, and later also executed warrants of arrest throughout England and in America. They had been able to prosecute violations of licensing and the city's trading regulations. In the 18th century, they were empowered to investigate and suppress gambling houses, corrupt dealings and connivance. The two marshals, an upper and an under employing six men paid a shilling a day, had to buy their office at a public auction, which raised the possibility of selling the office for a higher price. By the time Hitchen bought his titled job, the price had risen from £300 in 1696 to £700 in 1712. This induced some marshals to seek recovery of their investment by unlawful means, including blackmail and even murder. Their official income was not ungenerous—the upper marshal receiving £100 p.a. and the under-marshal £60, both also given allowance for clothes and horse, £5 annually for good service, about £30 for selling "a Freedom of the City", and a share from each prisoner's entrance fee to the prisons and watch-houses. The marshals were also allowed to collect and retain a tax of one penny per stall-keeper at Bartholomew Fair.

== In the office ==
The former cabinet-maker did not restrict himself to the income from the Lord Mayor of London. In fact, his famous words: "What do you think I bought my place for, but to make the most of it?" used to justify his crimes, describe the readiness with which he embraced his "duties". Not being the first to use the position as a form of legal theft, he regularised the practice. He had probably acted as a middleman or receiver between thieves and victims several years before taking the post, otherwise it would be difficult to explain his familiarity with London's underworld. He made full use of his authority as a leverage to build or extend his thief-taking business and stayed as a middleman in it. Hitchen managed to regulate about 2000 thieves and organise for them to steal and fence the stolen merchandise through him, a practice pickpockets would find more profitable or less dangerous than going to a pawnbroker, since most desperate victims of the theft were ready to pay a fee negotiated by the "finder" (Hitchen) for the return of their stolen items.

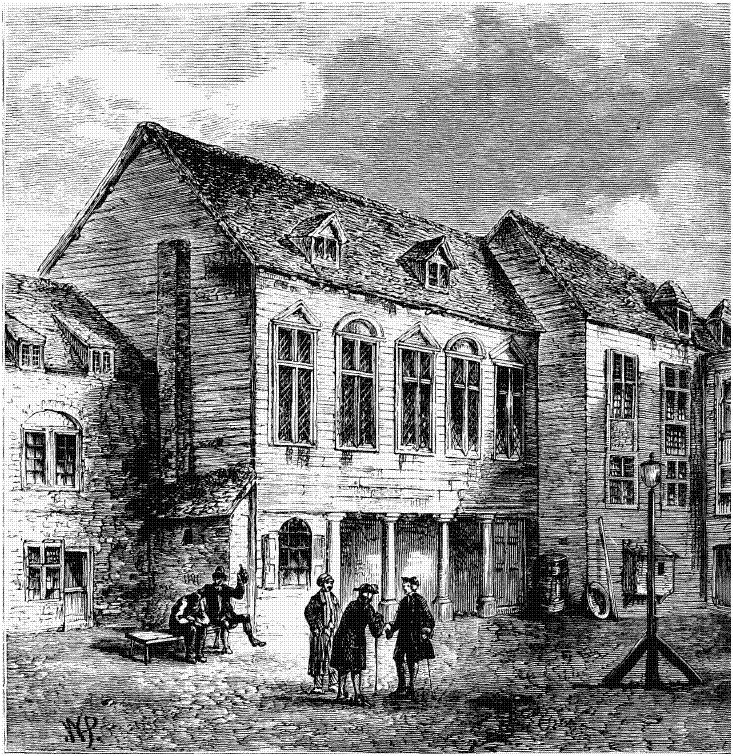

With the growth of paper money transfers, the early draught notices, and "notes of hand" (agreements to pay the bearer), pickpockets were causing larger and larger economic losses to traders and merchants. Hitchen learnt how valuable these notices were to their owners and started the trade of returning them for a reward. The risk was not great since, e.g., wallets were often stolen by prostitutes whose victims would be unlikely to prosecute a finder.

The under-marshal raided taverns and dram-shops on a daily basis, and extracted contributions. At Hatton's, Basinghall Street, he read the advertisements offering rewards. At Woolpack alehouse, Foster Lane, he wrote blackmail letters. At the Cross Keys, Holborn, he lunched with thieves. At the Blue Boar, Barbican, he made plans with them, and at the Clerkenwell Workhouse, his tricorn adorned with gold braid glittered over 12-year-old pickpockets, in whose company he very often visited Moorfields and its infamous "Sodomites' Walk". Blackmail was applied to targets like prostitute Marry Milliner, and later to Jonathan Wild's accomplice, who paid Hitchen for "protection". He extorted bribes from tradesmen in exchange for immunity from being robbed; brothels and Molly houses made quarterly payments to him. So, the practice later called a protection racket was mastered by the marshal.

== Accusations and suspension ==
Hitchen self-normalised his racket, so confident was he of his inviolability in the sense of having official immunity, that he began to boast of controlling dozens of thieves. At the beginning of September, the Court of Aldermen was presented an array of complaints from different layers of society, notably, all of whom were victims of pickpockets.

The court did not show much willingness to investigate the marshal's case. Since the post was usually sold as mentioned above, Hitchen's utter discharge would clearly cause its devaluation, i.e., it would not be easy, if possible at all, to sell the office knowing in advance one could lose it before receiving the value for it. And though, on the face of it, the case was a deal between the holder and the purchaser, the city treasury benefited from the sale. Hence, the aldermen adopted a cautious and neglectful approach. However, due to the seriousness of the complaints and the letter sent to the retiring Lord Mayor Sir Gilbert Heathcote by Hitchen's accusers, reminding him of the 1706 statute and its severe penalties for receiving, a committee under the retiring mayor was appointed to examine the case.

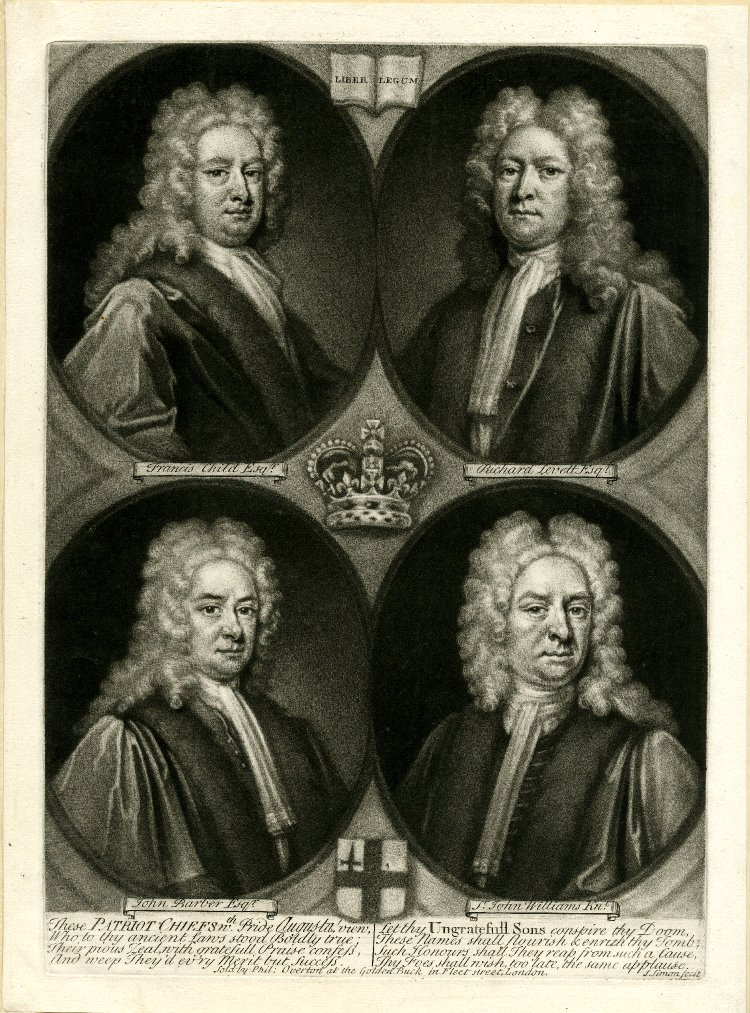

By 27 October, there had already been taken 10 testimonies all of which involved Hitchen as a receiver. Thomas Rogers, a Blackwell Hall factor, for example, complained of losing his letter case and pocket book at the Royal Exchange. Walter Corbet had lost his case with £200 exchequer bills at Charing Cross when watching the pillory of three men. Another Blackwell Hall factor and a Quaker, Nathaniel Smith, having lost his pocket book to a whore, told about being taken to Temple Bar surrounding in western part of the city by the under-marshal to meet the gang of thirty to forty young pickpockets, whom he referred to by their names. As victims reported, they had placed the advertisements on their losses, offering certain amount for the recovery, in The Daily Courant (most frequently used newspaper for advertisements among others). Hitchen relying on "his great knowledge of thieves and pickpockets" required exorbitant rewards as in Cobert's case, when a 5-guinea offering turned into a 50–60-guinea reward or when Dudley Downs had to pay 55 guineas for four exchequer bills of £200 value. But others like Smith, who was asked to pay 20 guineas, did not do so and caused marshal's campaign of vilification. Nevertheless, they dared to refer to other thief-taker Joseph Billers, an experienced competitor of Hitchen's, who was the one directing them to the Court of Aldermen. Most seriously, unsurprisingly, was taken the case, which concerned a loss of the letter with 200 guineas from a member of the nobility, Lord Barnard to Richard Lawrence, an apothecary. It was he who reported Hitchen in the court on telling him, during their negotiation, about making arrangements with 2000 thieves living in the Bills of Mortality. The fullest information, though, came from the written testimony by constable Wise of Shoreditch on 2 October 1712. He named the four infamous taverns, "Three Tuns", "Black Horse", "Blue Boar" and "King's Head" and an account of marshal's actual dealings there. He also remembered having arrested six pickpockets in one of the taverns above and causing marshal's rage, who upon showing a notice declared the county within his jurisdiction and took the thieves with him to the City letting them free. At the end of September, there were two pickpockets Christopher Plummer and William Field, notably from Hitchen's entourage, brought to the Guildhall and after testifying against their master granted freedom by Sir Charles Peters on 8 or 9 October 1712.

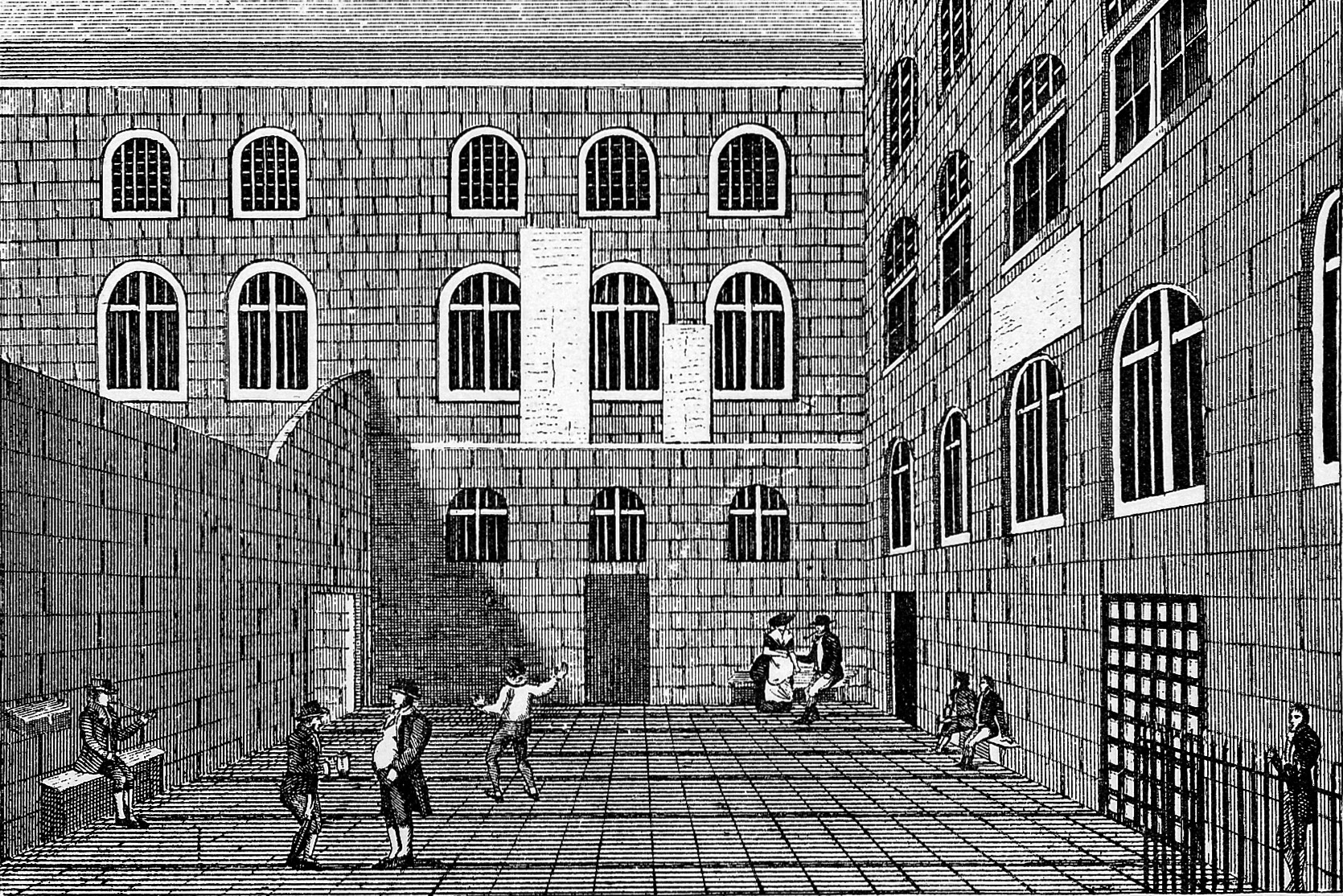

The embattled under-marshal would try hard to retain his power and after two months of being accused of the felonies, at last, on 16 December, he showed his written answer. The document is a record of the names of all those places mentioned above, where Hitchen met the thieves and organised crimes with them. It also gives the examples of social details, one of which explains how Lord Barnard's bills through a chain of accidents appeared in Hitchen's hands. If one did not tip the porter in the General Post Office, he would throw the letter out. Pickpockets, visiting the Office for their own purpose in the midnight, saw the other one at the door with the bills inside. Seeing the boys with the papers on the one side of the tavern and a sad victim on the other, set Hitchen to assist him. Certainly, this rather comic justification with others added to his main reason of being maliciously persecuted by the robbers was not to blindfold the Court of Aldermen, who were reluctant to take decision against him anyway for the clear reasons discussed above. On the other hand, they could not utterly ignore the Lord Mayor's reminder to the committee, that marshal's behaviour humiliated the city and reflected other officers' behaviour under the mayor. All they did, though, was rather cynical. After waiting for Hitchen's written defence, presented itself as late as 16 December, they did not read it until 16 January 1713. As for their decision on marshal's suspension, it came over five months late, that was 24 June 1713 and "forbade him attendance on the Lord Mayor" while retaining his power as a constable to obtain warrant when needed and apprehend.

== Partnership, reinstatement and rivalry ==
Being devoid of his employees' assistance, Hitchen was rendered to seek his resources to continue his "trade". At that time Jonathan Wild, a prisoner himself in the Wood street Compter for a debt (from 1709 to 16 December 1712, the exact date Hitchen's "Answer" was presented to the committee), was running his business in Cock Alley and was serving the public in a similar way to Hitchen. Wild, an under-keeper, while in the Compter, to the prisoners waiting for appearing before the magistrate, was well-acquainted with the prototypes of the personae of his further real life drama full of prostitutes and thieves (one of them, Marry Milliner, mentioned above). During these years he had already been practicing taking fees for recovering stolen letters and diaries, and only later developed into a thief-maker and a mastermind of organised crimes. There was virtually no type of crime he was not involved in; coining, forging, smuggling or protection rackets. It is obvious that a handicapped under-marshal would make a good use of such a scoundrel. It was actually him who ushered Wild from making his living with proceeds of prostitution and as a bailiff's assistant to the fully fledged thief-taker. In his account of 1713–14, written as an answer to Hitchen's "Regulator", Wild describes how the marshal approached him:

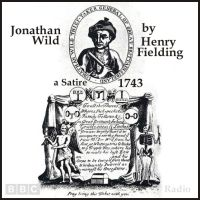

I am very sensible that you are let into the knowledge of the intrigues of the compter, particularly with relation to the securing of pocket books. But your experience is inferior to mine... I can put you in a far better method than you are acquainted with... But I must first tell you that you'll spoil the trade of thief-taking in advancing greater rewards than are necessary. I give but half a crown a book... And when the thieves and pickpockets see us confederate they'll submit to our terms.

Thus their partnership started, taking Hitchen and his assistant first to Temple Bar, westernmost limit of his area of jurisdiction. There, the marshal was revered with different "fine" drinks at different taverns, to which he only gave a brief sign asking for information on stolen goods. He was verbose, though, in his "promises of protection" to female visitors of those establishments:

"I'll give you my word...you shall be detected, unless you deliver all the pocket books you from time to time meet with to me...If you at any time for the future, refuse to yield... either to me or my servant, you may be assured of being all sent to Bridewell...''

Wild gives an example of the marshal's treatment of well-dressed women too. Once he seized a baillif's wife in the street in Ludgate Hill for talking to a man and accused her of being "lewd". He took her to Cheapside and made her wait till he dined and paid for his meal. Pickpockets, or "mathematicians" as Hitchen called them affectionately", appear with a noteworthy incident in this period. On their regular night walks near St Paul's, Hitchen and Wild saw the boys running away. Hitchen, having information on a stolen book, saw the reason of their hiding. He caught and arrested one, whose name was James Jones, the same juvenile who stole Lord Barnard's bills. The boy gave the address of his friends next morning before the justice and Hitchen took Wild to Barbican to attack their house during the night. The uninvited guests were welcomed with unfriendly 'damn ye', upon which the assistant Wild was left inside with the company while the marshal fled for bringing more constables. The gang of around 12-year-olds was taken and tried at Kingston assizes as their robbery was committed in Surrey. To the great disappointment and fury of the marshal, the court acquitted the boys upon their parents' complaint of the marshal forcing their children to commit crime. He could not claim the usual 40 pounds for their dead-or-alive heads. Moreover, he was reprimanded by the court for the base interest.

Meanwhile, Hitchen's petition in September 1713, and a proposed plan, to fight against the crime raised due to the ending of the War of the Spanish Succession, considerably bringing home more disfunctioned soldiers and sailors, resubmitted again in December 1713, were reconsidered by the Aldermen and on 6 April he was reinstated provided "better demeanour therein for the future". It was apparent the tandem would not be working as before for Hitchen would be able now to use his employees and other than that he should not have liked his assistant's better skills and keenness. On the other hand, Wild could be happy with his master's roughness and greediness. He left him and literally settled in the Little Old Bailey to employ his Intelligence Agency for Lost Goods to safely continue his business as a middleman and receiver. On 26 May 1714 Wild put one of his first advertisements in The Daily Courant thus marking the beginning of his unique method employed for the next ten years and very soon alarmed his former master with his fame and wealth. He began to cut down on Hitchen's own gangs and gave a start to a so-called paper war between Hitchen and him.

== Paper war ==
A response pamphlet to "The Regulator" issued by Jonathan Wild in May 1718

In April 1718, Hitchen published his pamphlet "A True Discovery of the Conduct of Receivers and Thief-takers, in and about the City of London: To the Multiplication and Encouragement of Thieves, Housebreakers, and other loose and disorderly Persons" dedicating it to the Lord Mayor Sir William Lewen, the Aldermen and Common Council of London. The tract shows Hitchen disguised as a social reformer and moralist giving his recommendations for rooting out the iniquities by imprisoning all the thief-takers and receivers. Hitchen did not directly name Wild in his first pamphlet but made an obvious allusion when talking about "the regulator" and "the thief-taker". The word "regulator" should have had very negative connotation due to king James II's "Committees of Regulators" appointed to change the result of the elections for the king's favour. By the time the pamphlet was written the word might have had the meaning of "a boss" indulged in bribery and corruption. The under-marshal chose the word for his second pamphlet written as a counterattack to Wild's answer and named it "The Regulator: or a Discovery of the Thieves, Thief-takers, and Locks, alias Receivers of Stolen Goods in and about the City of London." This treatise did not appear as effective as promised in presenting the ways to prevent crime. It was written worse than Wild's and due to the author's illiteracy could not be seriously taken by its audience. Neither could anyone be deceived by the statement on the title page, that it was written "By a Prisoner in Newgate". Probably called an "unthinking scribbler...expos'd to the world in his own treatise" by Wild, only whom "such a bundle of nonsense" could be composed, reflects on the society's view.

At the beginning of "the Regulator" Hitchen expresses his grievance for "such abominable practices" carried out by "such as have assumed the title of thief-takers" that "if these should hold their peace, the stones in the city would cry out" and thereupon adds that he hopes "effectual care will be taken to have the same strictly examined into." Hitchen gives one example out of many similar cases, where Wild saves his accomplices and prosecutes an innocent one, at least in that particular crime. Three "notorious rogues", William Mathews, Christopher Matthews and Obadiah Lemmon robbed a lady in a coach near St. Paul's Churchyard. Wild for fear of losing these profitable criminals, met the three and arranged for one of them to be an evidence in the court, which meant him giving the names of "a numerous train of offenders" and convicting them. but at the same time he should not have mentioned the stealing of a dozen of handkerchiefs and other robberies involving Wild directly as a receiver, otherwise they would lose their "factor" by "bringing his own neck into the noose and put it into power of every little prig". As a result, the three offenders escaped the justice and the thief-taker received a reward of £40 for arresting and hanging "shim-sham thieves", Hugh Oakley and Henry Chickley.

In order to give a better insight in "the humours and actions in a case" marshal draws the image of the "Goat" in Long Lane as a windmill, saying that its functioning depends on gaming houses, bawdy-houses, receivers and thief-takers the same way as windmill's on four sails. All four of them are regulated by the thief-taker of course. Besides denouncing him as a protector of coiners, prostitutes, etc. Hitchen coins the name of the thief-maker for Wild, used to refer to him by others later. Through a fictional character's eyes, that is some countryman, Hitchen tries to give a panoramic view of the "Goat" with old thieves, spies, suspicious women, Lemon himself sitting in the corner filling remorse for betrayal. This portrayal is considered somewhat clumsy alongside the insertion of "proclamation", a parody of Wild's advertisements, in the middle of the pamphlet. Here, Wild proclaimed as "His Skittish and Baboonish Majesty", assures the thieves of himself to be better equipped for subverting the course of justice and offers his legal protection and higher financial terms compared to those of their older "locks, fences and flash pawnbrokers". Hitchen finishes his treatise with the list of "flash cases" and Wild's "weekly pensioners". The list of convicts awaiting transportation under the "Transportation Act"(introduced as an alternative punishment to hanging) enables dating of the pamphlet between June and August. As for the publishers, they were Warner and B. Boreham, publishing Wild's responding pamphlet in May.(p. 102-104, Howson)

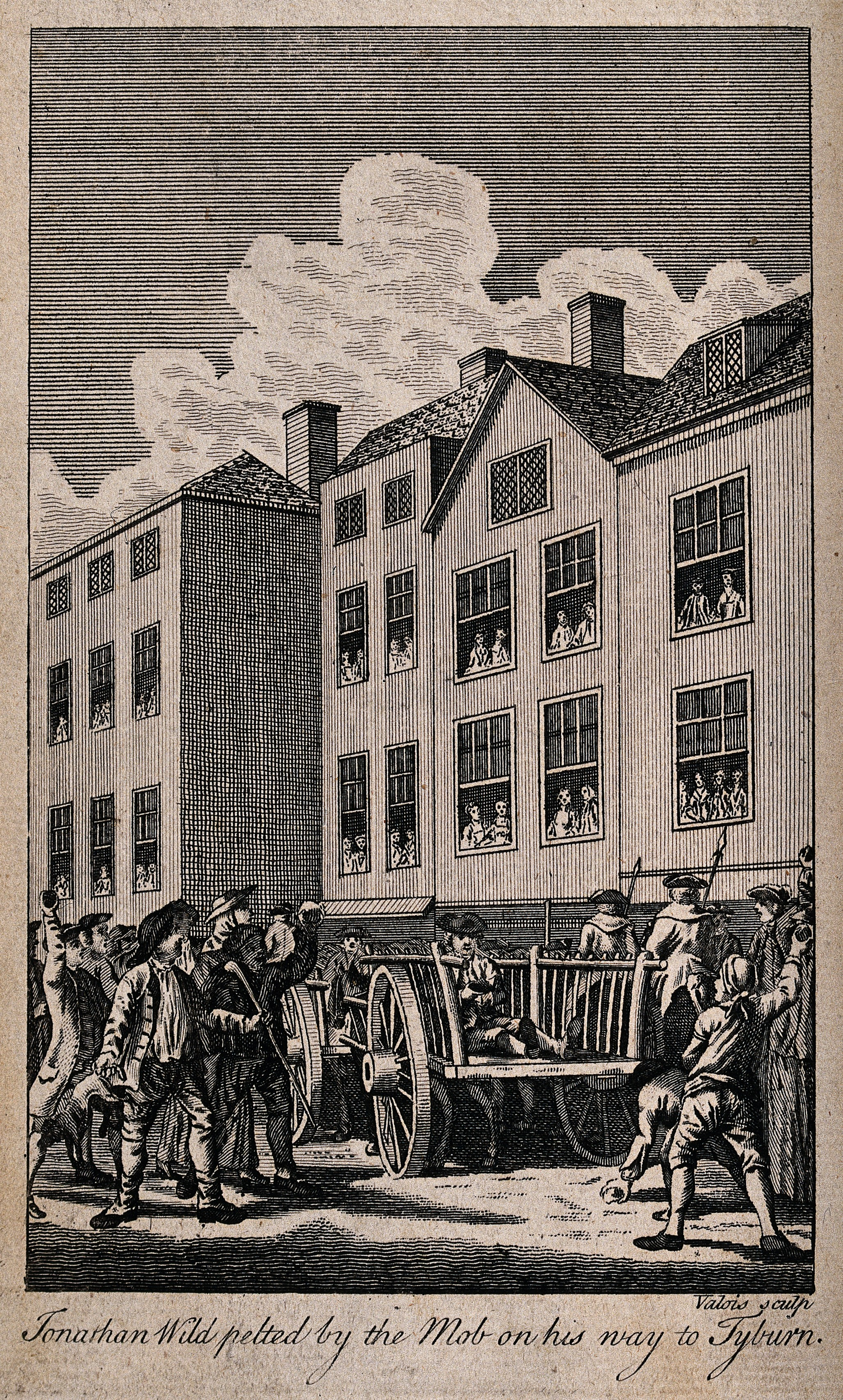
Jonathan Wild pelted by the mob on his way to Tyburn

Wild's Answer was written anonymously, he refers mostly to the years 1713-1714 for he had personal experience of marshals adventures and could not resist the temptation to describe them, including the scene "in a Sodomitish Academy". As other dealings are mentioned while reviewing their partnership, it is more interesting to describe the event when the under-marshal took his assistant, a buckle-maker as Wild refers to himself in his pamphlet, to a house near Old Bailey one night. The buckle-maker, having never met the types marshal was too willing to see, followed him and to his great surprise discovered men talking and behaving in effeminate way. No less surprising appeared marshal's reaction on being referred to as "your Ladyship" or "Madam", even more, he "dallied with the young sparks with a great deal of pleasure". However, no sooner had he seen those who might have exposed his "power of securing the lads to himself", he flew into a rage and threatened to "spoil their diversion". Later that night, marshal lurked with several constables near Mother Clap's House in Fleet street, Holborn, knowing that a masquerade would be held as usual and he would be able to catch several sodomites dressed in woman's apparel, which he did. Next morning detainees stood before the Lord Mayor and were committed to workhouse, but before were ordered to walk through the streets on the way in their bizarre look:"Some were completely rigg'd in gowns, petticoats, head cloths, fine lac'd shoes, furbelow scarves, and masks. Some had riding hoods; some were dressed like shepherdesses, others like milkmaids with fine green hats..." etc. Some time later they were released after Hitchen's application to the Lord Mayor having been threatened by one of them for his previous adventures with them. The experience appeared too humiliating for one of them and in few days he died after the release. Wild completes the narrating with recommending the under-marshal and his expertise to anyone interested in "Sodomitish Academy".

There is a mythologised approached as if Wild was caught after performing a violent jail break and stealing jewels from the installation ceremony for the Knights of the Garter, however, he was arrested and sentenced to death for receiving largely on the basis of William Field's evidence, who was Hitchen's former assistant and worked with Wild as well. Unsurprisingly, Wild had contributed to Hitchen's downfall mostly with his above described revelations of him.

== Downfall and sodomy arrest ==
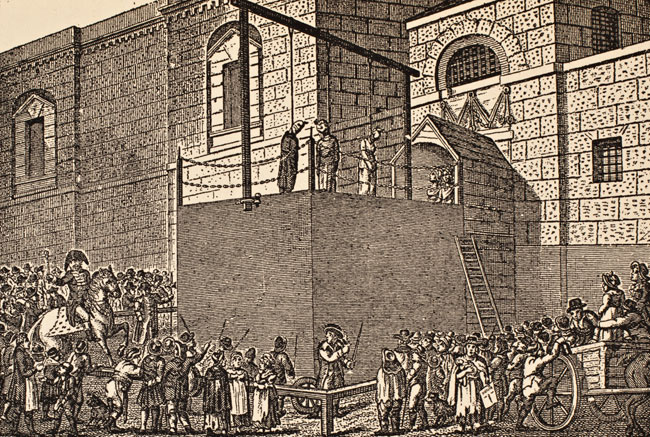

Newspaper reports or scores of satires of the eighteenth century provide substantial amount of information on thriving extensive gay subculture in the City of London of that period. So called "molly markets" for "picking up trade", among which Moorfields and St. James's Park were most notorious, certainly were not difficult to find. Not only did the open areas see "mollies', named so either according to the Latin word for "soft" or echoing a real name of many female immigrant prostitutes from Ireland, but most alehouses and coffee houses had a room out back for already agreed gay men, where they could find the privacy they sought. Thus, Molly houses were used for rendezvous every night by 30 to 40 men, predominantly from working class. However, the regular gatherings were disliked by the society. Neither did the 18th century judicial system recognise homosexual relations regarding it as assault and punished with fine, confinement, pillory or hanging. The 18th century Old Bailey records describe 85 trials for sodomitical offences and 50 for blackmailing, notably recording the name of Charles Hitchen as "under City Marshal, formerly a Cabinet-maker in St. Paul's Churchyard", who committed "that detestable Sin of Sodomy". Hitchen was targeted by the Societies for the Reformation of Manners, while being a member of it, which performed a sweep of London attempting to root out "sodomitical practices."

Although Charles Hitchen was married, he was an active homosexual. His hefty figure "with a long peruke and sword" was not an unfamiliar sight in Moorfields, strolling down the "sodomite walk". In early 1727, he took one Richard Williamson to the Talbot Inn on the Strand, where he frequently took soldiers from Savoy barracks. Williamson told his relative about the intercourse, and the two returned to the same tavern a week later to catch Hitchen with some other person. They got the cook of the tavern to fetch a watchman and had the marshal arrested. It is considered unlikely that Williamson and his relative spied on Hitchen on their own, as the regular constabulary was firmly under Hitchen's control. Most probably, he had long become an object of disgust for Reforming constables from the same Society, hence their readiness or involvement in Hitchen's prosecution.

== Trial in the Old Bailey ==
The trial was held on 12 April 1727. Hitchen was indicted for an assault of sodomy that he committed on 29 March and later for a misdemeanour, both on the same person, Richard Williamson.

The prosecutor provided embarrassing details of the crime to the jury. He described how Hitchen and Williamson moved from Royal Oak in the Strand to Rummer Tavern and came to the Talbot Inn, where the under-marshal ordered a bedroom. Along the way in each bar Hitchen offered either beer or wine and showed disgraceful manners. Williamson said he wanted to leave the marshal but was not allowed to, being forced to leave his hat with him and receiving a little money in return. According to Williamson's testimony he was persuaded to follow the marshal into the room, where he "did all that a beastly appetite could prompt him to". Williamson reported going to his relative, Joseph Cockrost, who took him back to the tavern and asked to be informed as soon as the prisoner appeared, which happened the following Saturday. In his testimony Cockrost mentioned knocking at the door after seeing "filthy actions" through the keyhole. When opening the door he took the marshal by the collar and threatened him, saying, "I'll whip you through the Gills" when he laid his hand on the sword. Testimonies were given by a servant of the tavern proving to have seen the same scene with the prosecutor, a constable, John Carter, watchmen and some character witnesses. The constable opposed the watchmen, who were probably trying to accuse Williamson of inventing the story. At last, the prisoner was acquitted of actual sodomy and found guilty on the second charge, assault. For "sodomitical practices" Hitchen was fined £20 and sentenced to 6 months imprisonment and standing in the pillory near the end of Catherine Street, in the Strand.

The newspapers carried details of his crime and trial, and they also announced the exact place and time of his pillorying. He was put in the stocks on 26 April (or 2 May) 1727. A barricade of coaches and carts was placed around the stocks by constables and others referred to as "friends and brethren" by the newspapers. Despite the obstacle, the crowd, composed mostly of prostitutes from Drury Lane, broke the line and beat the marshal viciously. The torrent of filth and stones tore the clothes of the pilloried and the Under-Sheriff removed Hitchen from the stocks long before the hour was out in order to save his life. After several weeks Hitchen recovered enough to charge three men with assault. He then served his six months in prison. Attempts to remove him from his post were in vain. In November he managed to sell it for £700 and used the sum to pay the sureties for his good behaviour before being discharged. He died about a month later, probably as a result of complications from injuries received in the pillory. His widow petitioned the courts for relief and received a 20-pound annuity.

== Literary references ==
Jake Arnott features him heavily in his 2017 novel The Fatal Tree.

== Bibliography ==
- Matthew, H.C.G. (2004). The Oxford Dictionary of National Biography. London: Oxford UP. pp. 335–336 vol. 27. ISBN 0-19-861411-X
- Lyons, Frederick (1936). Jonathan Wild, Prince of Robbers. London: Michael Joseph. pp. 248–302. ASIN B000LABB98
- Howson, Gerald (1970). Thief-taker General: the Rise and Fall of Jonathan Wild. Hutchinson. ISBN 978-0-09-101750-7
- Hitchcock T. and Shoemaker R. (2006), Tales from the Hanging Court, London: Bloomsbury, ISBN 978-0-340-91375-8
- Beattie, J.M. (2003). Policing and Punishment in London, 1660-1750: Urban Crime and the Limit of Terror. USA: Oxford University Press. ISBN 978-0-19-925723-2
- Robert Aldrich and Garry Wotherspoon "Who is Who, in Gay and Lesbian History, from Antiquity to World War II", (London and New York, 2001) ISBN 978-0415159821
- R. Norton (ed.) "Jonathan Wild Exposes Charles Hitchin, 1718," Homosexuality in Eighteenth-Century England: A Sourcebook. 29 April 2000, updated 16 June 2008 http://www.rictornorton.co.uk/eighteen/hitchin2.htm
- April 1727, trial of Charles Hitchin https://www.oldbaileyonline.org/browse.jsp?id=t17270412-41-defend243&div=t17270412-41
- The Tyburn Chronicle: Or, The Villainy Display'd in All Its Branches, volume 2, https://books.google.com/books?id=VOdCAAAAcAAJ
- "Wild Intentions" Chris Hales, (2008) Pittsburgh, USA, ISBN 978-1-4349-9102-7
- "The Thieftaker" Darren Rapier, (2009) Tualen press, London, ISBN 978-0-9556798-3-4
- "Select Trials at the Sessions-House in the Old-Bailey, vol.III from April 1726, to May 1732. J. Applebee. ISBN 978-1275311206
- "Newgate, London's prototype of Hell" Stephen Halliday, 2013. Sutton Publishing Limited, Gloucestershire. ISBN 978-0-7524-9555-2
- "The Regulator" https://books.google.com/books?id=2T1fAAAAcAAJ
