= Jonathan Wild =

18th century English criminal (1682/83–1725)

- Vignette of Wild from Old England by Charles Knight, p. 326
- Born: 1682 or 1683; Wolverhampton, England
- Died: 24 May 1725 (aged 41–42); Tyburn Tree Gallows, England
- Other name: The Great Corrupter
- Occupations: Carpenter, buckle-maker, criminal gang leader, fence, thief, vigilante
- Employer(s): Lord Mayor of London, self-employed
- Known for: Vigilantism, larceny, organized crime, social manipulation
- Title: Thief-Taker General
- Predecessor: Charles Hitchen
- Successor: Charles Hitchen
- Opponent: Charles Hitchen
- Status: Publicly executed on 24 May 1725
- Motive: Economic gain via thief-taking
- Criminal charge: Theft
- Penalty: Death by hanging
- Accomplice: Mary Milliner

Details
- Country: England
- Imprisoned at: Newgate Prison

Jonathan Wild (or Wilde; 1682 or 1683 – 24 May 1725) was an English thief-taker and a major figure in London's criminal underworld, notable for operating on both sides of the law, posing as a public-spirited vigilante entitled the "Thief-Taker General". He simultaneously ran a significant criminal empire, and used his crimefighting role to remove rivals and launder the proceeds of his own crimes.

Wild exploited a strong public demand for action during a major 18th-century crime wave in the absence of any effective police force in London. As a powerful gang-leader himself, he became a master manipulator of legal systems, collecting the rewards offered for valuables which he had stolen himself, bribing prison guards to release his colleagues, and blackmailing any who crossed him. Wild was consulted on crime by the government due to his apparently remarkable prowess in locating stolen items and those who had stolen them.

Wild was responsible for the arrest and execution of Jack Sheppard, a petty thief and burglar who had won the public's affection as a lovable rogue. However, Wild's duplicity became known and his men began to give evidence against him. After a suicide attempt, he was hanged at Tyburn before a massive crowd.

Since his death, Wild has been featured in novels, poems and plays, some of them noting parallels between Wild and the contemporaneous Prime Minister Walpole, known as "The Great Corrupter".

== Early life ==
Though his exact birth date is unknown, Jonathan Wild was born in Wolverhampton in either 1682 or 1683 – although he was also alleged to have been born in the nearby Shropshire village of Boningale – as the first of five children in a poor family. He was baptised at St. Peter's Collegiate Church, Wolverhampton. His father, John Wild, was a carpenter, and his mother sold herbs and fruits in the local market. At that time, Wolverhampton was the second-largest town in Staffordshire, with a population of around 6,000, many involved in iron-working and related trades.

Wild attended the Free School in St John's Lane and was apprenticed to a local buckle-maker. He married and had a son, but came to London in 1704 as a servant. After being dismissed by his master he returned to Wolverhampton, before coming back to London in 1708. London was by far the largest city in England, with a population of around 600,000, of whom around 70,000 lived within the ancient city walls of the City of London.

Little is known of Wild's first two years in London, but he was arrested for debt in March 1710 and sent to Wood Street Compter, one of the debtor's prisons in the City of London. The prisons were notoriously corrupt, with gaolers demanding a bribe, or "garnish", for any minor comfort. Wild became popular, running errands for the gaolers and eventually earning enough to repay his original debts and the cost of being imprisoned, and even lend money to other prisoners. He received "the liberty of the gate", meaning that he was allowed out at night to aid in the arrest of thieves. There, he met one Mary Milliner (or Mary Mollineaux), a prostitute who began to teach Wild criminal ways and, according to Daniel Defoe, "brought him into her own gang, whether of thieves or whores, or of both, is not much material". Wild was also introduced to a wide range of London's criminal underclass. With his new skills and contacts, Wild was released in 1712 under an Act of Parliament passed earlier that year for the relief of insolvent debtors.

Upon release, Wild began to live with Milliner as her husband in Lewkenor's Land (now Macklin Street) in Covent Garden, despite both of them having prior marriages. Wild apparently served as Milliner's tough when she went night-walking. Soon Wild was thoroughly acquainted with the underworld, with both its methods and its inhabitants. At some point during this period, Milliner had begun to act as something of a madam to other prostitutes, and Wild as a fence, or receiver of stolen goods. He began, slowly at first, to dispose of stolen goods and to pay bribes to get thieves out of prison. Wild later parted with Milliner, cutting off her ear to mark her as a prostitute.

== Coming into his own ==
Crime had risen dramatically in London beginning in 1680, and property crime, in particular, rose sharply as London grew in importance as a commercial hub. In 1712 Charles Hitchen, Wild's forerunner and future rival as thief-taker, said that he personally knew 2,000 people in London who made their living solely by theft. In 1711, Hitchen had obtained public office as the City's Under Marshal, effectively its top policeman, paying £700 (£115,000 in 2025) for the appointment. He abused his office, however, by practising extortion on an extravagant scale, both from thieves and from their potential victims. He would accept bribes to let thieves out of jail, selectively arrest criminals, and coerce sexual services from molly houses. Hitchen's testimony about the rise of crime was given during an investigation of these activities by the London Board of Aldermen, who suspended him from the Under Marshal position in 1713.

In around 1713, Wild was approached by Hitchen to become one of his assistants in thief-taking, a profitable activity on account of the £40 reward (£7,000 in 2025) paid by the government for catching a felon. Wild may have become known to Hitchen's associates, known as his "Mathematicians", during his lengthy stay in Wood Street Compter; certainly one, William Field, later worked for Wild.

The advent of daily newspapers had led to a rising interest in crime and criminals. As the papers reported notable crimes and ingenious attacks, the public worried more and more about property crime and grew increasingly interested in the issues of criminals and policing. London depended entirely upon localised policing and had no citywide police force. Unease with crime was at a feverish high. The public was eager to embrace both colourful criminals (e.g. Jack Sheppard and the entirely upper-class gang called the "Mohocks" in 1712) and valiant crime-fighters. The city's population had more than doubled, and there was no effective means of controlling crime. London saw a rise not only in thievery, but in organised crime during the period.

The ending of the War of the Spanish Succession in 1714 meant a further increase in crime as demobilised soldiers were on the streets. By this time, Hitchen was restored to his office but Wild went his own way, opening a small office in the Blue Boar tavern run by Mrs Seagoe in Little Old Bailey. Wild continued to call himself Hitchen's "Deputy", entirely without any official standing, and took to carrying a sword as a mark of his supposed authority, also alluding to pretensions of gentility.

== Wild's public career as "Thief-Taker General" ==
It is believed that Wild's method of illegally amassing riches while appearing to be on the side of the law was ingenious. He ran a gang of thieves, kept the stolen goods, and waited for the crime and theft to be announced in the newspapers. At this point, he would claim that his "thief-taking agents" (bounty hunters) had found the stolen merchandise, and he would return it to its rightful owners for a reward (to cover the expenses of running his agents). In some cases, if the stolen items or circumstances allowed for blackmail, he did not wait for the theft to be announced. In addition to "recovering" these stolen goods, he would offer the police aid in finding the thieves. The thieves that Wild would help to "discover", however, were rivals or members of his own gang who had refused to cooperate with his taking the majority of the money.

Wild's ability to hold his gang together, and indeed the majority of his scheme, relied upon the fear of theft and the nation's reaction to theft. The crime of selling stolen goods became increasingly dangerous between 1700 and 1720, such that low-level thieves ran a great risk in fencing their goods. Wild avoided this danger and exploited it simultaneously by having his gang steal, either through pickpocketing or, more often, mugging, and then by "recovering" the goods. He never sold the goods back, explicitly, nor ever pretended that they were not stolen. He claimed at all times that he found the goods by policing and avowed hatred of thieves. That very penalty for selling stolen goods, however, allowed Wild to control his gang very effectively, for he could turn in any of his thieves to the authorities at any time. By giving the goods to him for a cut of the profits, Wild's thieves were selling stolen goods. If they did not give their take to him, Wild would simply apprehend them as thieves. However, what Wild chiefly did was use his thieves and ruffians to "apprehend" rival gangs.

Wild was not the first thief-taker who was actually a thief himself. Hitchen had used his position as Under Marshal to practise extortion, pressuring brothels and pickpockets to pay him off. When Hitchen was suspended from his duties for corruption in 1712, he engaged Wild to keep his business of extortion going in his absence. Hitchen was reinstated in 1714 and found that Wild was now a rival, and one of Wild's first acts of gang warfare was to eliminate as many of the thieves in Hitchen's control as he could. In 1718, Hitchen attempted to expose Wild with his manuscript, A True Discovery of the Conduct of Receivers and Thief-Takers in and about the City of London, in which he named Wild as a manager and source of crime.

Wild replied with a manuscript of his own, An Answer to a Late Insolent Libel, and there explained that Hitchen was a homosexual who visited "molly houses" (homosexual brothels). Hitchen attempted to further combat Wild with a pamphlet entitled The Regulator, which was his characterization of Wild, but Hitchen's prior suspensions from duties and the shocking (at that time) charge of homosexuality virtually eliminated him as a threat to Wild.

Wild held a virtual monopoly on crime in London, and legends arose surrounding his management of his "empire." One held that he kept records of all thieves in his employ, and when they had outlived their usefulness he would sell them to the gallows for the £40 reward. This supposed system inspired a fake or folk etymology of the phrase "double cross": it was alleged that, when a thief vexed Wild in some way, he put a cross by the thief's name; a second cross condemned the man to be sold to the Crown for hanging. (This story is contradicted by the fact that the noun "double cross" did not enter English usage until 1834.)

Wild publicly presented a heroic face. In 1718 he called himself "Thief Taker General of Great Britain and Ireland". By his testimony, over sixty thieves were sent to the gallows. His "finding" of lost merchandise was private, but his efforts at finding thieves were public. Wild's office in the Old Bailey was a busy spot. Victims of crime would come by, even before announcing their losses, and discover that Wild's agents had "found" the missing items, and Wild would offer to help find the criminals for an extra fee. However, while fictional treatments made use of the device, it is not known whether or not Wild ever actually turned in one of his own gang for a private fee.

In 1720, Wild's fame was such that the Privy Council consulted with him on methods of controlling crime. His recommendation was, unsurprisingly, that the rewards for evidence against thieves be raised. Indeed, the reward for capturing a thief went from £40 to £140 within the year, amounting to a significant pay increase for Wild.

There is some evidence that Wild was favoured, or at least ignored, by the Whig politicians and opposed by the Tory politicians. In 1718, a Tory group had succeeded in having the laws against receiving stolen property tightened, primarily with Wild's activities in mind. Ironically, these laws had the opposite intended effect of strengthening Wild's hand, for it made it more difficult for thieves to fence their goods except through Wild.

Wild's battles with thieves made excellent press. Wild himself would approach the papers with accounts of his derring-do, and the papers passed these on to a concerned public. Thus, in the summer of 1724, the papers carried accounts of Wild's heroic efforts in collecting twenty-one members of the Carrick Gang (with an £800 reward — approximately £152,000 in 2025). When one of the members of the gang was released, Wild pursued him and had him arrested on "further information". To the public, this seemed like a relentless defence of order. In reality, it was gang warfare disguised as a national service.

When Wild solicited for a finder's fee, he usually held all the power in the transaction. For example, David Nokes quotes (based on Howson) the following advertisement from the Daily Post in 1724 in his edition of Henry Fielding's The Life and Death of Jonathan Wild, the Great:

"Lost, the 1st of October, a black shagreen Pocket-Book, edged with
Silver, with some Notes of Hand. The said Book was lost in the
Strand, near Fountain Tavern, about 7 or 8 o'clock at Night. If
any Person will bring aforementioned Book to Mr Jonathan Wild,
in the Old Bailey, he shall have a Guinea reward."

The advertisement is extortion. The "notes of hand" (agreements of debt) means signatures, so Wild already knows the name of the notebook's owner. Furthermore, Wild tells the owner through the ad that he knows what its owner was doing at the time, since the Fountain Tavern was a brothel. The real purpose of the ad is to threaten the owner with announcing his visit to a bordello, either to the debtors or the public, and it even names a price for silence (a guinea, or one pound and one shilling).

== The Jack Sheppard struggle and downfall ==
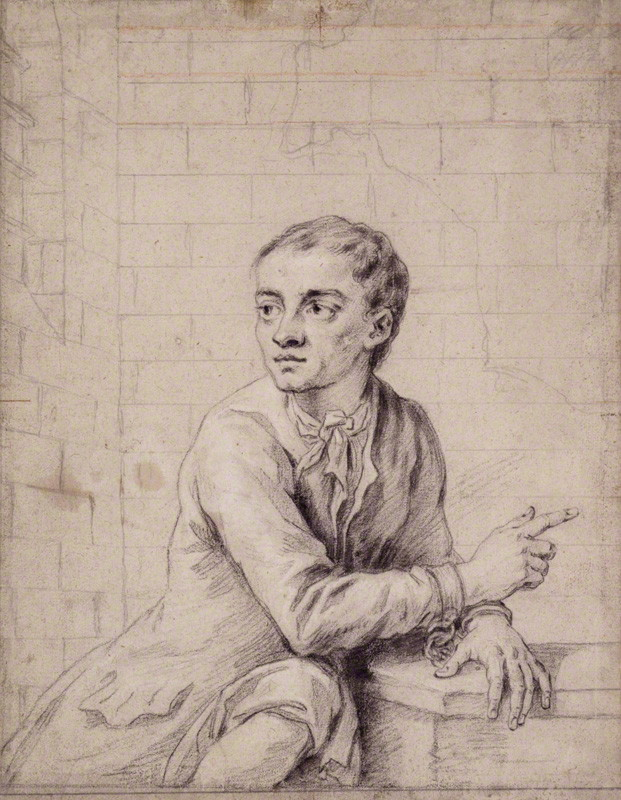
Chalk and pencil sketch of Jack Sheppard in Newgate Prison, attributed to Sir James Thornhill, circa 1724

By 1724, London political life was experiencing a crisis of public confidence. The South Sea Bubble had burst four years earlier, and the public was growing restive about corruption. Authority figures were beginning to be viewed with scepticism. In April 1724, the most famous housebreaker of the era, Jack Sheppard, was apprehended by one of Wild's men, James "Hell-and-Fury" Sykes, for a burglary Sheppard had committed in Clare Market on 5 February. Sheppard had worked with Wild in the past, though he had struck out on his own. Consequently, as with other arrests, Wild's interests in saving the public from Sheppard were personal.

Sheppard was imprisoned in St Giles's Roundhouse, but escaped within three hours. On 19 May, Wild again had Sheppard arrested for pickpocketing, and this time he was put in St. Ann's Roundhouse in Soho, where he was visited by Elizabeth "Edgworth Bess" Lyon the next day; she too was locked up with him and, being recognised as man and wife, they were sent to the New Prison at Clerkenwell. They both escaped on 25 May. In July, Field informed Wild about Sheppard, so Wild sought for Lyon on 22 July and plied her with drinks at Temple Bar until she betrayed Sheppard.

The following day, Wild sent another one of his men, Quilt Arnold, and had Sheppard arrested a third time and put into Newgate Prison to await trial. On 13 August Sheppard was tried on three charges of burglary, but was acquitted of the first two due to lack of evidence. However, Wild, along with Field and William Kneebone, Sheppard's former master, presented evidence against him on the final charge of the burglary of Kneebone's house on 12 July; Sheppard was convicted, sentenced to death, and put in the condemned hold of Newgate Prison.

On the night that the death warrant arrived, 31 August, Sheppard once again escaped. By this point, he was a working class hero for apprentices (being a cockney apprentice in love, non-violent, and handsome). On 9 September, Sheppard avoided capture by Wild's men, but he was caught for a fourth time by a posse from Newgate as he hid out on Finchley Common. Sheppard was returned to Newgate and placed in the most secure room of the prison. Further, Sheppard was put in shackles and chained to the floor.

Meanwhile, on 9 October, Wild and his men arrested Joseph "Blueskin" Blake, a highwayman and Sheppard's partner-in-crime. On 15 October, Blueskin was tried for the same act of burglary committed on 12 July, with Wild, Field, and his men giving evidence. Their accounts were not consistent with the evidence given at Sheppard's trial, but Blueskin was convicted and sentenced to death anyway. After the trial, Blueskin pleaded with Wild in the courtroom to have his death sentence commuted to transportation (since he had worked with Wild before), but Wild refused. Enraged, Blueskin attempted to murder Wild, slashing his throat with a pocketknife and causing an uproar. Wild collapsed and was taken to a surgeon for treatment.

Taking advantage of the disturbance that spread to Newgate next door and continued into the night, Sheppard escaped yet again on 16 October. He had broken the chains, padlocks, and six iron-barred doors. This escape astonished everyone, and Daniel Defoe, working as a journalist, wrote an account. In the early morning on 1 November, Sheppard was found for a fifth and final time by a constable and arrested. This time, he was placed in the centre of Newgate, where he could be observed at all times, and loaded with three hundred pounds of iron weights. He was so celebrated that the gaolers charged high society visitors to see him, and James Thornhill painted his portrait.

On 11 November, Blueskin was hanged. Five days later, Sheppard was similarly hanged at Tyburn. Wild did not attend either of the executions, as he was confined to his bed for several weeks while the injury to his throat was healing.

Wild's inability to control Sheppard, and his injuries at the hands of Blueskin, combined with a change of public sentiment regarding authority figures, led to his downfall. As he recuperated from his injury, his control over his criminal gang also slipped, and he became despised. After his recovery, Wild used violence to perform a jailbreak for one of his gang members. Being searched for, he went into hiding for several weeks and returned to business when he thought the affair had blown over. On 6 February 1725, Wild was summoned to Leicester House, where he failed to recover a gold watch for one of his attendants because of the jailbreak and the incident with Blueskin at the Old Bailey.

== Arrest, trial and execution ==
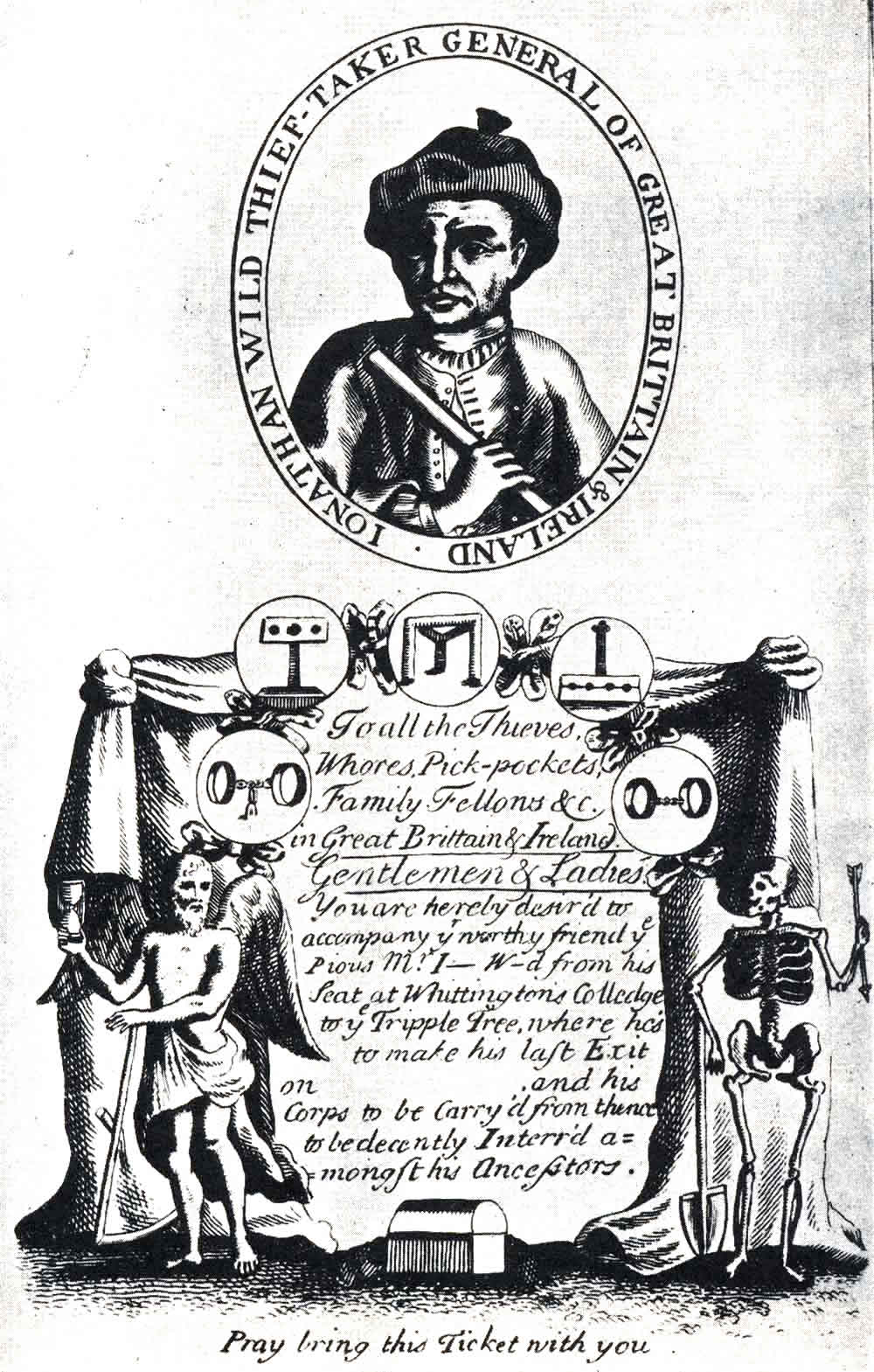
A gallows ticket to view the hanging of Jonathan Wild

On 15 February, Wild and Arnold were arrested for the jailbreak. Wild was placed in Newgate, where he continued to attempt to run his business. In the illustration from the True Effigy (top of page), Wild is pictured in Newgate, still with notebook in hand to account for goods coming in and going out of his office. Evidence was presented against Wild for the violent jailbreak and for having stolen jewels during the previous August's installation of Knights of the Garter.

The public's mood had shifted; they supported the average man and resented authority figures. Wild's trial occurred at the same time as that of the Lord Chancellor, Lord Thomas Parker, 1st Earl of Macclesfield, for taking £100,000 in bribes. With the changing tide, it appeared at last to Wild's gang that their leader would not escape and they began to come forward. Slowly, gang members began to turn evidence on him, until all of his activities, including his grand scheme of running and then hanging thieves, became known. Additionally, evidence was offered as to Wild's frequent bribery of public officers.

Wild's final trial occurred at the Old Bailey on 15 May. He was tried on two indictments of privately stealing 50 yards (46 m) of lace from Catherine Statham (a lace-seller who had visited him in prison on 10 March) at Holborn on 22 January. He was acquitted of the first charge, but with Statham's evidence presented against him on the second charge, he was convicted and sentenced to death. Terrified, Wild asked for a reprieve but was refused. He could not eat or go to church, and suffered from insanity and gout.

On the morning of his execution, in fear of death, Wild attempted suicide by drinking a large dose of laudanum, but because he was weakened by fasting, he vomited violently and sank into a coma from which he would not awaken. When he was taken to the gallows at Tyburn on 24 May 1725, Defoe said that the crowd was far larger than any they had seen before and that, instead of any celebration or commiseration with the condemned,

Wherever he came, there was nothing but hollowing and huzzas,
as if it had been upon a triumph.

Wild's hanging was a great event, and tickets were sold in advance for the best vantage points (see the reproduction of the gallows ticket). Even in a year with a great many macabre spectacles, Wild drew an especially large and boisterous crowd. Eighteen-year-old Henry Fielding was in attendance. Wild was accompanied by William Sperry and the two Roberts: Sanford and Harpham; three of the four prisoners who had been condemned to die with Wild a few days before. Because he was heavily drugged, Wild was the last to die after the three of them, without any difficulty that had happened at Sheppard's execution. The hangman, Richard Arnet, had been a guest at Wild's wedding.

In the dead of night, Wild's body was buried in secret at the churchyard of St Pancras Old Church next to Elizabeth Mann, his third wife and one of his many lovers (who had died in about 1718), as he had wished. His burial was only temporary. In the 18th century, autopsies and dissections were performed on the most notorious criminals, and consequently Wild's body was exhumed and sold to the Royal College of Surgeons for dissection. His skeletal remains are on public display in the Royal College's Hunterian Museum in Lincoln's Inn Fields.

== Literary treatments ==
Jonathan Wild is famous today not so much for setting the example for organised crime as for the uses satirists made of his story. When he was hanged, the papers were filled with accounts of his life, collections of his sayings, farewell speeches and the like. Defoe wrote one narrative for Applebee's Journal in May and then had published True and Genuine Account of the Life and Actions of the Late Jonathan Wild in June 1725. This work competed with another that claimed to have excerpts from Wild's diaries. The illustration above is from the frontispiece to the "True Effigy of Mr. Jonathan Wild", a companion piece to one of the pamphlets purporting to offer the thief-taker's biography.

Criminal biography was a genre. These works offered a touching account of need, a fall from innocence, sex, violence and then repentance or a tearful end. Public fascination with the dark side of human nature and with the causes of evil has never waned, and the market for mass-produced accounts was large.

By 1701, there had been a Lives of the Gamesters (often appended to Charles Cotton's The Compleat Gamester), about notorious gamblers. In 1714, Captain Alexander Smith had written the best-selling Complete Lives of the Most Notorious Highwaymen. Defoe himself was no stranger to this market: his Moll Flanders was published in 1722. By 1725, Defoe had written a History and a Narrative of the life of Sheppard (see above). Moll Flanders may be based on the life of one Moll King, who lived with Mary Mollineaux/Milliner, Wild's first mistress.

What differs about the case of Wild is that it was not simply a crime story. Parallels between Wild and Robert Walpole were instantly drawn, especially by the Tory authors of the day. Mist's Weekly Journal (one of the more rough-speaking Tory journals) drew a parallel between the figures in May 1725, when the hanging was still in the news.

The parallel is most important for John Gay's The Beggar's Opera in 1728. The main story of the Beggar's Opera focuses on the episodes between Wild and Sheppard. In the opera, the character of Peachum stands in for Wild (who stands in for Walpole), while the figure of Macheath stands in for Sheppard (who stands in for Wild and/or the chief officers of the South Sea Company). Robert Walpole himself saw and enjoyed Beggar's Opera without realising that he was its intended target. Once he did realise it, he banned the sequel opera, Polly, without staging. This prompted Gay to write to a friend, "For writing in the cause of virtue and against the fashionable vices, I have become the most hated man in England almost."

In 1742, Walpole lost his position of power in the British House of Commons. He was created a peer and moved to the House of Lords, from where he still directed the Whig majority in the Commons for years. In 1743, Henry Fielding's The Life and Death of Jonathan Wild, the Great appeared in the third volume of Miscellanies.

Fielding is merciless in his attack on Walpole. In his work, Wild stands in for Walpole directly, and, in particular, he invokes the Walpolean language of the "Great Man". Walpole had come to be described by both the Whig and then, satirically, by the Tory political writers as the "Great Man", and Fielding has his Wild constantly striving, with stupid violence, to be "Great". "Greatness", according to Fielding, is only attained by mounting to the top stair (of the gallows). Fielding's satire also consistently attacks the Whig party by having Wild choose, among all the thieves cant terms (several lexicons of which were printed with the Lives of Wild in 1725), "prig" to refer to the profession of burglary. Fielding suggests that Wild becoming a Great Prig was the same as Walpole becoming a Great Whig: theft and the Whig party were never so directly linked.

The figures of Peachum and Macheath were picked up by Bertolt Brecht for his updating of Gay's opera as The Threepenny Opera. The Sheppard character, Macheath, is the "hero" of the song "Mack the Knife".

In Sir Arthur Conan Doyle's Sherlock Holmes novel, The Valley of Fear, the arch-villain Professor Moriarty is referred to as a latter-day Jonathan Wild by Holmes:

"Everything comes in circles—even Professor Moriarty. Jonathan Wild was the hidden force of the London criminals, to whom he sold his brains and his organization on a fifteen per cent. commission. The old wheel turns, and the same spoke comes up."

In 2000, Jonathan Wild appeared as a character in the David Liss novel A Conspiracy of Paper, ISBN 0-8041-1912-0. Jonathan Wild is also the title character in the 2005–2006 Phantom stories "Jonathan Wild: King of Thieves" and "Jonathan Wild: Double Cross".

In 2014, author Aaron Skirboll released The Thief-Taker Hangings: How Daniel Defoe, Jonathan Wild, and Jack Sheppard Captivated London and Created the Celebrity Criminal.

In 2015, Jonathan Wild appeared as a character in Paul Tobin's Eisner-nominated (2015) graphic novel I Was the Cat, drawn by Benjamin Dewey.

Jake Arnott featured him as one of the main characters in his 2017 novel The Fatal Tree.

Jonathan Wild has an important role in the background to the fantasy novel The Hanging Tree, the sixth part of Ben Aaronovitch's Rivers of London series. Much of the book's plot revolves around a secret magical treatise by Isaac Newton, which was stolen by Jonathan Wild and disappeared for centuries, only to reappear in the underworld of 21st-century London.

Confessions of the Fox, a novel by Jordy Rosenberg (2018), mostly about Jack Sheppard, has Wild as an important character.

Markus Gasser's 2022 novel Die Verschwörung der Krähen, based on the life of Daniel Defoe, includes Wild, spelled Wylde, as the secret ruler of the London underworld.

Zadie Smith's 2023 novel, The Fraud.

== In popular culture ==
- In 1969, James Clavell's screenplay for the film Where's Jack? told the story of Jack Shepherd (Tommy Steele) with Wild (Stanley Baker) being depicted as a suave and sinister criminal mastermind.
- Songwriter Jimmy Webb describes Wild's life and subsequent hanging in the 1977 song "Highwayman". A 1985 recording by the country music supergroup The Highwaymen entered the Hot Country Songs Billboard chart on 18 May 1985, rising to number 1, and spending 20 weeks total on the chart. Webb had a dream that he was a highwayman, which initially inspired the writing of the song.
- In the 1999 film Plunkett & Macleane, Wild was the inspiration for the film's antagonist; the psychopathic Thief Taker General Chance, played by Ken Stott.

== See also ==
- Liberty of the Mint for more background on "anomalous districts" of lawlessness.

== Bibliography ==
There are a few treatments of Wild that attempt to dramatise his life, but there remains only one full length non-fiction biography on Wild:

- Howson, Gerald. Thief-Taker General: Jonathan Wild and the Emergence of Crime and Corruption as a Way of Life in Eighteenth-Century England. New Brunswick, NJ and Oxford, UK: 1970. ISBN 0-88738-032-8.

Other 20th century sources

- Brief discussions of Jonathan Wild may be found in editions of the Beggar's Opera, the Works of John Gay, the Works of Henry Fielding, editions of Fielding's Jonathan Wild, the Works of Daniel Defoe, and biographies of Defoe, such as the one by Paula Backschieder. All of these are prefatory and explanatory material. Most of these derive either from the Dictionary of National Biography or from Gerald Howson.
- Lyons, Frederick J. Jonathan Wild, Prince of Robbers. 1936.
- Moore, Lucy. The Thieves' Opera. 1997.
- Woodhall, Edwin T. Jonathan Wild, Old Time Ace Receiver. 1937.
- Hendrickson, Robert Encyclopedia of Word and Phrase Origins. 1997.
- Mullan, John, and Christopher Reid. Eighteenth-Century Popular Culture: A Selection. Oxford University Press, 2000. ISBN 0-19-871134-4.
- "Wild, Jonathan" . Encyclopædia Britannica (11th ed.). 1911.
- Rines, George Edwin, ed. (1920). "Wild, Jonathan" . Encyclopedia Americana.

18th century sources

- An Authentic Narrative of the Parentage, Birth, Education and Practices of Jonathan Wild, Citizen and Thief Taker of London, broadsheet. 1725.
- Jonathan Wild's Last Farewell to the World. Anonymous ballad.
- "H.D., Clerk of Justice." The Life of Jonathan Wild, from his Birth to his Death. 1725 (possibly by Daniel Defoe).
- Defoe, Daniel ? A True & Genuine Account of the Life and Actions of the late Jonathan Wild, Not made up of Fictions and Fable, but taken from his Own Mouth and collected from PAPERS of his Own Writing. June, 1725.
- Defoe, Daniel. A True & Genuine Account of the Life and Death of the Late Jonathan Wild. 1725 (reprinted in various editions of Defoe's works and some editions of Henry Fielding's Jonathan Wild).
- Smith, Captain Alexander. The Memoirs of the Life & Times of the famous Jonathan Wild, together with the History & Lives of Modern Rogues. 1726.
