= 1868 in the United Kingdom =

Events from the year 1868 in the United Kingdom.

== Incumbents ==
- Monarch – Victoria
- Prime Minister – Edward Smith-Stanley, 14th Earl of Derby (Conservative) (until 27 February); Benjamin Disraeli (Conservative) (starting 27 February, until 1 December); William Ewart Gladstone (Liberal) (starting 3 December)

== Events ==
- 2 January – British Expedition to Abyssinia: Robert Napier leads an expedition to free captive British officials and missionaries.
- 9 January – penal transportation from Britain to Australia ends with arrival of the convict ship Hougoumont in Western Australia after an 89-day voyage from England.
- 13 February – the War Office sanctions the formation of what will become the Army Post Office Corps.
- 27 February – Benjamin Disraeli succeeds the Earl of Derby as Prime Minister following Derby's resignation due to ill-health.
- 12 March – Britain annexes Basutoland and it becomes a protectorate.
- 14 March – Eliza Lynn Linton's article "The Girl of the Period" is published in the Saturday Review.
- 2 April – last public hanging of a woman in Britain – Frances Kidder outside Maidstone Prison by William Calcraft for drowning her stepdaughter.
- 9–13 April – expedition to Abyssinia: At the Battle of Magdala, Robert Napier decisively defeats the emperor Tewodros II.
- 25 April – HMS Repulse, the last wooden battleship constructed for the Royal Navy, is launched as an ironclad (with auxiliary steam propulsion) at Woolwich Dockyard.
- 29 April – the Court of King's Bench (England) decides on appeal the legal case Regina v. Hicklin on interpretation of the word "obscene" in the Obscene Publications Act 1857, applying the "Hicklin test": that any part of a publication with a "tendency... to deprave and corrupt those whose minds are open to such immoral influences, and into whose hands a publication of this sort may fall" makes the whole publication obscene, regardless of the author's intentions.
- 10–11 May – "Murphy riots" against Irish people in Ashton-under-Lyne.
- 26 May – last public hanging in Britain – Fenian bomber Michael Barrett outside Newgate Prison in London by William Calcraft for his part in the Clerkenwell explosion of 1867.
- 29 May – Capital Punishment Amendment Act abolishes public hanging in Britain.
- 2 June – the first Trades Union Congress is held in Manchester.
- 29 June – the Press Association founded in London.
- July – the Summer assize for Berkshire is moved from Abingdon to Reading, effectively making the latter the county town.
- 17 July – judicial decision of the House of Lords in Rylands v Fletcher, a leading case in English tort law, establishing a standard of strict liability in negligence actions.
- 31 July
  - Pharmacy Act 1868 regulates the profession of pharmacist and restricts sale of poisons and dangerous drugs.
  - Church rate ceases to be compulsory.
- 13 August – first non-public hanging in Britain – Thomas Wells inside Maidstone Prison by William Calcraft.
- 20 August – Abergele train disaster kills 32 passengers and a fireman.
- 20 October – astronomer Norman Lockyer observes and names the D_{3} Fraunhofer line in the solar spectrum and concludes that it is caused by a hitherto unidentified chemical element which he later names helium.
- 12 November – Archibald Tait is offered the post of Archbishop of Canterbury.
- 15–24 November – general election, the first under the extended franchise of the Reform Act 1867: Liberal Party victorious.
- 24 November – the Smithfield Meat Market opens in London.
- 3 December – William Ewart Gladstone becomes Prime Minister.
- 10 December
  - Whitaker's Almanack first published.
  - The world's first traffic lights are installed in Parliament Square in London.

=== Undated ===
- The Foreign & Colonial Investment Trust is founded by Philip Rose as The Foreign & Colonial Government Trust, the world's first collective investment scheme.
- Thomas Henry Huxley discovers what he thinks is a primordial matter and names it bathybius haecklii (he admits his mistake in 1871).

== Publications ==
- Wilkie Collins' novel The Moonstone.
- Queen Victoria's diary Leaves from the Journal of Our Life in the Highlands, from 1848 to 1861.

== Births ==
- 5 January – Edward Garnett, writer, critic and literary editor (died 1937)
- 4 February – Constance Markievicz, née Gore-Booth, Anglo-Irish parliamentarian (died 1927 in Ireland)
- 7 February – Aleen Cust, Irish veterinary surgeon (died 1937)
- 12 February – William Faversham, actor (died 1940)
- 22 February – David Devant, stage magician (died 1941)
- 15 March – Grace Chisholm Young, mathematician (died 1944)
- 22 March – Alfred Fowler, astronomer (died 1940)
- 25 March – William Lockwood, cricketer (died 1932)
- 4 April – Philippa Fawcett, mathematician (died 1948)
- 5 April – Percy Furnivall, racing cyclist and surgeon (died 1938)
- 10 April – George Arliss, film actor (died 1946)
- 12 April – J. L. Garvin, newspaper editor (died 1947)
- 14 April – Annie S. D. Maunder, née Russell, Irish-born astronomer (died 1947)
- 25 April – Willie Maley, Irish-born Scotland footballer and manager (died 1958)
- 28 April – Lucy Booth, Salvationist, fifth daughter of William and Catherine Booth (died 1953)
- 30 April – J. B. Christopherson, physician (died 1955)
- 5 June – James Connolly, Scottish-born Irish nationalist leader (executed 1916 in Ireland)
- 6 June – Robert Falcon Scott, Antarctic explorer (died 1912)
- 7 June – Charles Rennie Mackintosh, Scottish architect (died 1928)
- 6 July – Princess Victoria (died 1935)
- 14 July – Gertrude Bell, archaeologist, writer, spy and administrator (died 1926)
- 7 August – Granville Bantock, classical composer and conductor (died 1946)
- 21 October – Ernest Swinton, general, pioneer of the military tank (died 1951)
- 23 October
  - Frederick W. Lanchester, automotive engineer (died 1946)
  - William Rylands, businessman and baronet (died 1948)
- 30 November
  - Angela Brazil, writer of schoolgirl fiction (died 1947)
  - Ernest Newman, music critic (died 1959)

== Deaths ==
- 10 February – Sir David Brewster, Scottish scientist, inventor and writer (born 1781)
- 24 February – John Herapath, physicist and railway journalist (born 1790)
- 25 February – James Parke, 1st Baron Wensleydale, judge (born 1782)
- 28 March – James Brudenell, 7th Earl of Cardigan, military leader (born 1797)
- 12 April – James Gascoyne-Cecil, 2nd Marquess of Salisbury, politician (born 1791)
- 2 May – James Wilson Carmichael, marine painter (born 1800)
- 7 May – Henry Peter Brougham, Lord High Chancellor of Great Britain (born 1778)
- 11 May – John Crawfurd, Scottish physician, colonial administrator, diplomat and author; last British Resident of Singapore (born 1783)
- 26 July – Robert Rolfe, 1st Baron Cranworth, Lord Chancellor (born 1791)
- 29 July
  - John Elliotson, physician and author (born 1791)
  - Sir John Lillie, army officer, entrepreneur and inventor (born 1790)
- 3 August – Edward Welch, Welsh-born architect (born 1806)
- 17 August – Duncan Forbes, linguist (born 1798)
- 24 September – Henry Hart Milman, historian and ecclesiastic (born 1791)
- 27 October – Charles Longley, Archbishop of Canterbury (born 1794)
- 28 October – Sir Richard Pakenham, diplomat, Ambassador to the United States (born 1797)
- 23 December – Sir Herbert Edwardes, general and colonial administrator (born 1819)
