= Deborah Churchill =

Churchill [alias Miller], Deborah (1677/1682–1708), murderer

- Born: c. 1677; Norfolk, England
- Died: December 17, 1708; Tyburn, London, England
- Occupations: Prostitute, pickpocket
- Status: Executed by hanging
- Criminal charges: Accessory to murder
- Accomplices: Richard Hunt; William Lewis; John Boy

Details
- Victims: Martin Were

Deborah Churchill (c. 1677–1708) was a British pickpocket and prostitute executed for being an accomplice to murder in 1708.

== Life ==
Deborah Churchill was born in Norfolk to a respectable family in about 1677. Her first marriage was with John Churchill, an Army Ensign who died of alcoholism. She had two children by him.

== Criminal Career ==
Churchill later cohabited with a Richard Hunt in London, became a prostitute and picked the pockets of her clients. Hunt extracted money from wealthy clients by blackmailing them and whenever Churchill was arrested, he ensured her release by bribing officials. One account stated that she had been to the Clerkenwell Bridewell 28 times and was once sentenced to New Prison for the theft of 104 guineas. On another occasion, she was liable for a large debt and to escape it duped a soldier into marrying her and on their wedding night escaped; her husband thus became responsible for her debt and she could not be prosecuted.

== Murder of Martin Were ==
In 1708, she was moving through Drury Lane closely followed by Hunt and his two friends, William Lewis and John Boy. She tried to pick the pocket of a merchant, Martin Were, but he pushed her to the ground instead. Immediately the three men reached the spot and on Churchill's insistence stabbed Were. The three men fled to Holland and only Churchill was apprehended.

== Trial and Execution ==
On 26 February 1708, she was ordered to be executed for being an accessory. However, to escape the sentence, Churchill falsely informed the court that she was pregnant. This delayed her execution by seven months. When the court learned of her lie, it ordered for the sentence to be carried out immediately and she was executed in Tyburn on 17 December 1708 before a large audience whom she asked to pray for her. An entry on her appears in The Newgate Calendar.
