= William Weare =

William Weare may refer to:

- William Weare, victim in the Radlett murder
- William Weare alias Browne, MP for Calne (UK Parliament constituency)
