= Radlett murder =

Murder in 1823 in Hertfordshire

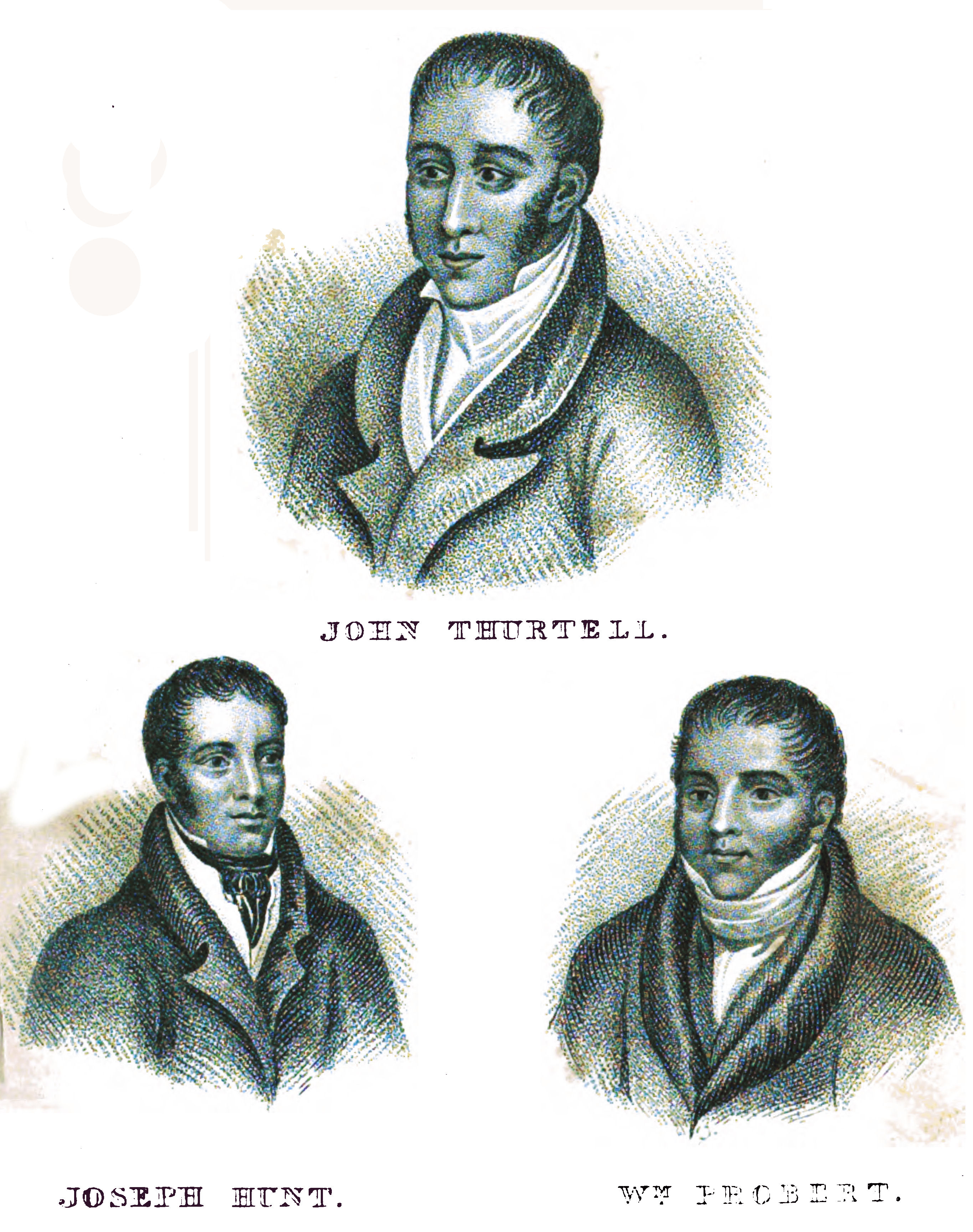
Killer John Thurtell, and his accomplices, Joseph Hunt, and William Probert

The Radlett murder, also known as the Elstree murder, was an 1823 murder in Radlett, Hertfordshire, England, in the United Kingdom. The victim, William Weare, was killed in Radlett and the body disposed of in a pond in nearby Elstree. The crime gained a great deal of attention and was the subject of numerous books and stage plays. It is commemorated by the rhyme:

They cut his throat from ear to ear,
His head they battered in.
His name was Mr William Weare,
He lived in Lyons Inn. (Note: Popular ballad, authorship uncertain, to the tune of "There's nae Luck aboot the Hoose." Circulated widely in broadside format. Lyrics variously attributed to Theodore Hook, a contemporary humorist; William Webb, a transported convict; and John Wilson Croker, a politician and author.)

== The killing ==
William Weare was a gambler and a solicitor of Lyon's Inn. His killer was John Thurtell (1794–1824), a sports promoter, amateur boxer, a former Royal Marine officer and a son of the mayor of Norwich. Thurtell owed Weare a gambling debt of £300, an immense sum at the time (equivalent to £22,400 in 2015), which he believed Weare had gained by cheating. Whatever the truth, when Weare demanded the money Thurtell decided to murder him rather than pay up.

Thurtell invited Weare to join him and his friends – Joseph Hunt, a tavern landlord, and William Probert, a former convict and alcohol merchant – for a weekend of gambling at Probert's cottage at the site of Oaks Close off Gills Hill Lane (subsequently popularly known as Murder Lane), Radlett. On 24 October 1823 they journeyed from London in Thurtell's horse-drawn gig, but Weare was killed in a dark lane just short of their destination.

Thurtell shot Weare in the face with a flintlock muff pistol, but this failed to kill him. Weare escaped from the gig but did not get far before Thurtell caught him. As Weare lay injured, Thurtell slit his throat with a knife before driving the pistol into his head with such force that his brains were dashed over the ground. Assisted by Hunt and Probert he hid the corpse in a pond near the cottage. This hiding place was judged too unsafe for Probert, however, and the body was moved to another pond in Elstree. By this time both weapons had been found, as Thurtell had left them on the road. The pistol was one of a pair, the other still in Thurtell's possession. The culprits were identified and caught. Hunt himself led the authorities to the body.

== Trial ==
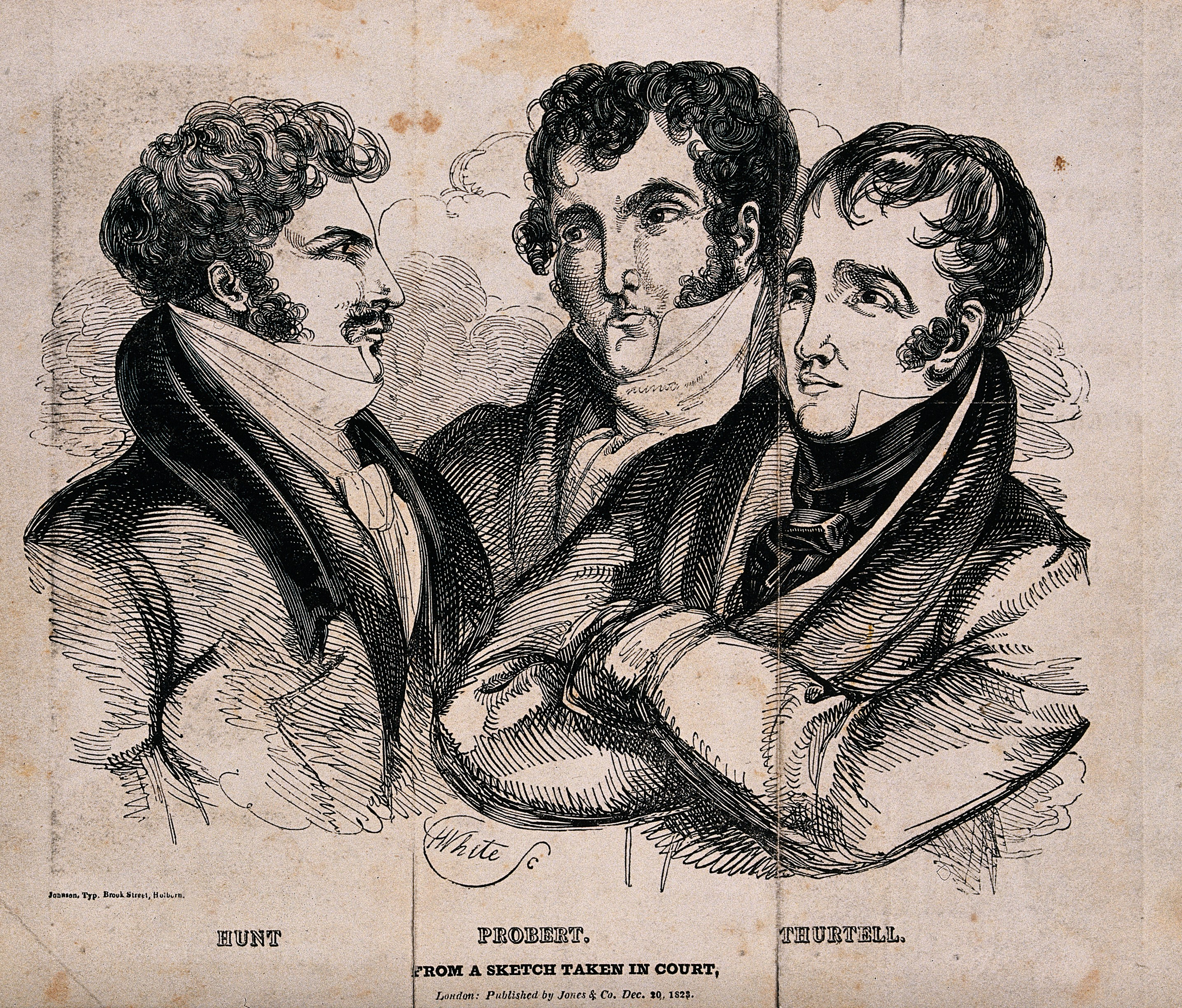
Hunt, Probert, and Thurtell; from a sketch taken in court.

Thurtell, Hunt and Probert were indicted for murder. The foreman of the grand jury which indicted them was William Lamb, who as Lord Melbourne would later become Prime Minister. The three were tried at Hertford Assize Court. Even though Hunt had cooperated the most with the authorities, it was Probert who was offered the chance to save himself by turning King's evidence against the other two in exchange for freedom. Hunt was tried as an accessory to murder; his counsel was Frederic Thesiger, a future Lord Chancellor (head of the English judiciary).

The murder case attracted unprecedented publicity, to the point where questions were raised as to whether the defendants could have a fair trial. Construction of a gallows was begun even before the trial started. The trial judge, Mr Justice Park, lamented: "If these statements of evidence before trial which corrupt the purity of the administration of justice in its source are not checked, I tremble for the fate of our country." Nevertheless he allowed Thurtell and Hunt to be convicted.

Thurtell and his associates’ actions pursuant to the murder were as widely reported and commented upon as the crime itself. Having temporarily disposed of Weare’s corpse, "the trio entered the house, Hunt was introduced to Mrs Probert, directions were given to cook some pork chops for supper, and then Thurtell took the two men to the field, where they rifled the body, and left it lying enveloped in the sack. After supper a jovial evening was spent, Hunt sang several songs over the grog, and Thurtell gallantly presented Mrs. Probert with the gold chain he had taken from the body." A contemporary street ballad, The Hertfordshire Tragedy, did not fail to emphasize the particulars:

Although his hands were warm with blood,
He down to supper sat,
And passed the time in merry mood,
With drink and songs and chat.

The singing in particular commanded attention. In discussing post-homicide cold-blooded tranquility, H.B. Irving (a Victorian barrister and oldest son of the Victorian stage star Sir Henry Irving), author of the Book of Remarkable Criminals remarks, “Such callousness is almost unsurpassed in the annals of criminal insensibility. Nero fiddling over burning Rome, Thurtell fresh from the murder of Weare, inviting Hunt, the singer and his accomplice, to ‘tip them a stave’ after supper . . .” Nor were the proceedings of the trial lacking in amusement, supplied generously by Hunt’s testimony in court. Hunt was questioned about the supper indulged in immediately after the murder: “Was the supper postponed?”—“No, it was pork.” Another piece of testimony had literary value: when someone was asked about the character of Thurtell, the answer was that he was a gentleman because he kept a gig. Thomas Carlyle seized upon this as a definition of a false gentility, writing about "gigmanity".

== Punishment ==
Thurtell was hanged on 9 January 1824, aged 29, by Thomas Cheshire assisting James Foxen. Having always denied his crime, he admitted it on the gallows. On the day after his death, Thurtell's body was dissected (part of the sentence for murderers at the time). A waxwork of his body was displayed in Madame Tussauds for 150 years. Although Thurtell had been popular and had received public sympathy, some of his relatives still chose to change their names to avoid being associated with him.

Hunt was also sentenced to death, but in recognition of his cooperation his sentence was commuted to transportation to an Australian penal colony for life. He was taken to Botany Bay, where he rehabilitated. After serving his time, Hunt gained his freedom and started a life in Australia, marrying and raising a son and a daughter. He became such a respected man that he became a police constable. Hunt died in 1861.

Probert was never punished for Weare's death. However reports of his involvement in the newspapers meant he was reviled and became a social outcast. Unable to find work, Probert resorted to crime to support himself and his wife, and in 1825, at 33, was hanged at Newgate Prison for stealing a horse worth £25 from a relative.

== Notoriety ==
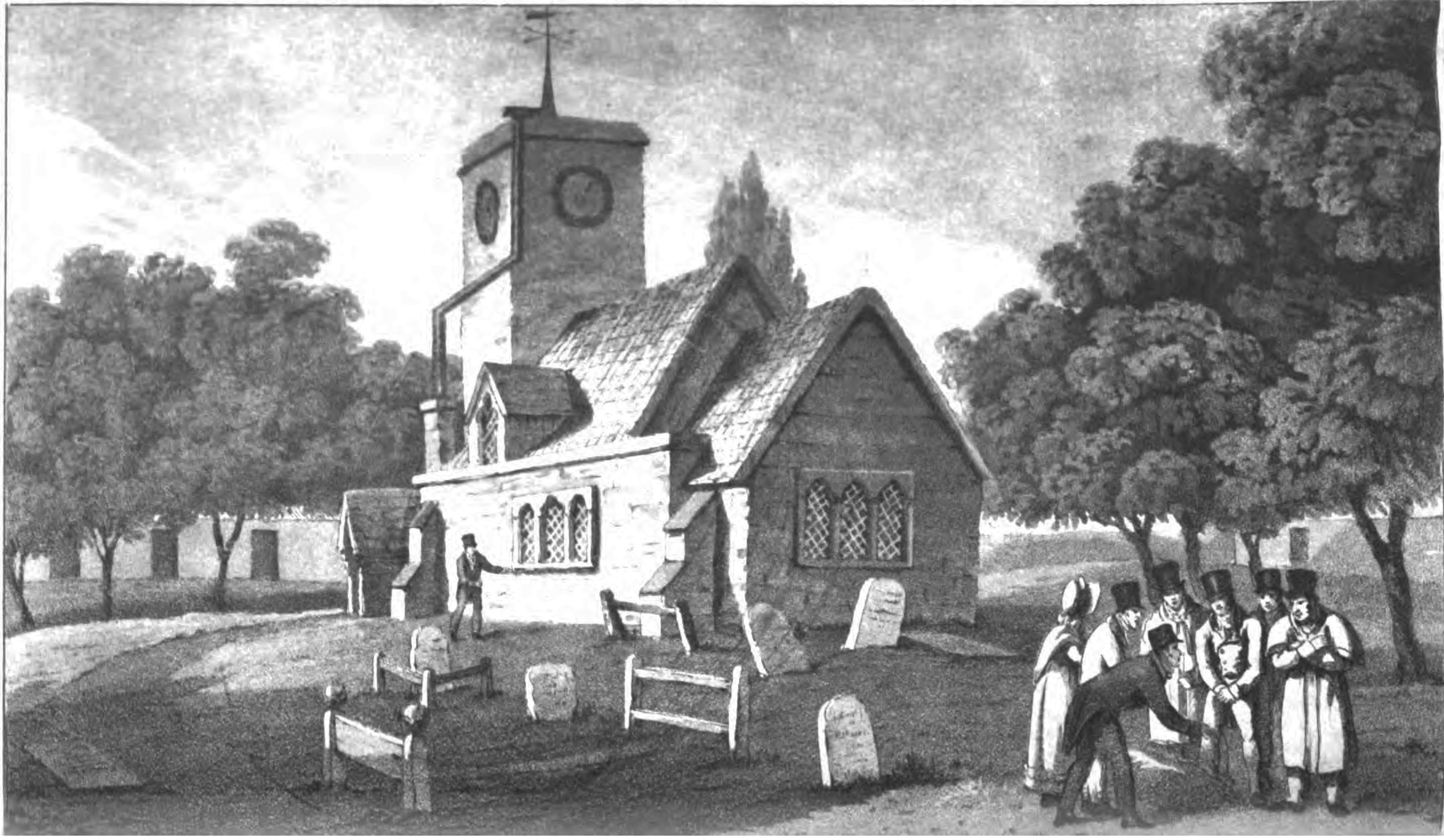
The burial of William Weare at St Nicholas parish church in Elstree

Besides the gruesome details, the murder was also sensational because it exposed the seedy London underworld of gambling and amateur boxing to a public ignorant of it. As more details were published of the underworld which Thurtell and Weare had inhabited, there were increasing calls for something to be done.

The case retained notoriety throughout the century. Like many others, Sir Walter Scott visited the murder location a few years after it took place. In his diary he wrote of the "labyrinth of intricate lanes, which seemed made on purpose to afford strangers the full benefit of a dark night and a drunk driver, in order to visit Gill’s Hill, famous for the murder of Mr. Weare . . . The principal part of the house is destroyed, and only the kitchen remains standing. The garden has been dismantled, though a few laurels and flowering shrubs, run wild, continue to mark the spot. The fatal pond is now only a green swamp, but so near the house, that one cannot conceive how it was ever chosen as a place of temporary concealment for the murdered body. The dirt of the present habitation equals its desolation . . . [t]he landlord had dismantled the place because no respectable person would live there."

Another distinguished essayist, Thomas Babington Macaulay, acidly remarked: "There is a possibility that Thurtell may have killed Weare only in order to give the youth of England an impressive warning against gaming and bad company. There is a possibility that Fauntleroy may have forged powers of attorney, only in order that his fate might turn the attention of the public to the defects of the penal law. These things, we say, are possible. But they are so extravagantly improbable that a man who should act on such suppositions would be fit only for Saint Luke’s."

Thomas De Quincey reviewed the murder (among others) from an art critic's viewpoint in his satirical essay "On Murder Considered as one of the Fine Arts."

There are other literary connections for Thurtell. Among his acquaintances were the essayist William Hazlitt (who talked of him as "Tom Turtle" in the essay The Fight), the sports historian Pierce Egan, and the writer George Borrow. Weare too had contact with the intelligentsia, as he frequently played billiards with the future controversial Shakespearean scholar John Payne Collier.

Several artefacts associated with the murder are in storage at Hertford Museum, including a satirical 19th century cartoon, a wooden chain carved by the prisoners awaiting trial, and the murder weapon.

In the 1885 short story Markheim by Robert Louis Stevenson there is a reference to a wax chamber of horrors with "Weare in the death grip of Thurtell".

== Notes ==
=== Other sources ===
- Borowitz, Albert (1987). The Thurtell-Hunt Murder Case: Dark Mirror of Regency England. Louisiana State University Press, 304. ISBN 0-8071-1371-9
- Flanders, Judith (2011). The Invention of Murder. Harper Press. pp. 20–45. ISBN 978-0-00-724888-9.
- Irving, H. B. ed. (1920). Trial of Thurtell and Hunt. Edinburgh: William Hodge & Co., 1920. Notable British Trials series.
- Jones, George Henry (1824). Account of the murder of the late Mr. William Weare. Printed by J. Nichols and son, for Sherwood, Jones, and co.
- Wratten, Donald (1990). The Book of Radlett and Aldenham. Quotes Ltd, 132. ISBN 0-86023-464-9
