= John Barnard Byles =

English lawyer and judge

Sir John Barnard Byles (11 January 1801 – 3 February 1884) was a British barrister, judge and author of books on law and the economy. He published an influential text on bills of exchange in 1829, commonly referred to as "Byles on Bills".

== Early life ==
Byles was the a grandson of Mr Jeremiah Byles (1733–1790), a timber-merchant from Stowmarket, Suffolk, England.

== Career ==
Byles studied law and became a member of the Inner Temple, where he was a pupil of the renowned Joseph Chitty, and became a special pleader.

In 1829, he published a seminal work on bills of exchange, A Treatise on the Law of Bills of Exchange, Promissory Notes, Bank-Notes, and Cheques, which is commonly referred to as Byles on Bills. He is even said to have named his horse "Bills", so that when approaching, people would utter "Here comes Byles on Bills". He was called to the Bar in November 1831. He joined the Norfolk circuit and in 1840 he was appointed recorder of Buckingham, and then in 1843 became a Serjeant-at-law. In 1857, he was appointed Queen's Serjeant. Byles once ran as a candidate for Parliament in the Aylesbury constituency, but lost.

In January 1858 he was promoted to the bench and was later made a Knight Bachelor and Justice of the Common Pleas. He often oversaw cases at the Central Criminal Court in London. He was described by the contemporary press as being a judge of the "old school", reminiscent of lawyers from Elizabethan times in his predilection for employing old-fashioned sayings and "saws". He was also a stickler for proper (black) clothing in court, once remarking to Lord Coleridge "I always listen with little pleasure to the arguments of counsel whose legs are encased in light gray trousers". In January 1873 he resigned as a judge due to his failing health. He then became, on 3 March, a member of the Privy Council but he died soon after on 3 February 1884, aged 83. He resided in Hatfield House, Uxbridge.

== Personal life ==
Byles married, firstly, Hannah Foster in August 1828, the daughter of John Foster, a merchant of Biggleswade; she died shortly after the marriage. He married in August 1836 Emma Nash Wedd, the daughter of Joseph Pattisson Wedd, a solicitor of Royston; she died in July 1872. Of their children, the eldest son, Walter Barnard, was called to the Bar in 1866 and the second eldest, Maurice Barnard, was called in 1866.

== Notable cases ==
- Daniel Good - sentenced to death for murder in 1842. Before his trial, he escaped from custody and the ensuing chase caused the police to set up the Detective Branch for pursuing criminals on the run. Caught and hanged.
- James Bloomfield Rush - Hanged for the murders of Isaac Jermy, the Recorder of Norwich, and his son, Isaac Jermy Jermy, in 1849.
- Catherine Wilson - found guilty of poisoning in 1862 and hanged. Byles told defence lawyer, Montagu Williams, Q.C., directly after the trial ended: "I sent for you to tell you that you did that case remarkably well. But it was no good; the facts were too strong. I prosecuted Rush for the murder of Mr. Jermy, I defended Daniel Good, and I defended several other notable criminals when I was on the Norfolk Circuit; but, if it will be of any satisfaction to you, I may tell you that in my opinion you have to-day defended the greatest criminal that ever lived."
- William Roupell - found guilty of fraud in 1862.
- Frances Kidder - found guilty of murder in 1868, hanged.
- Rev. John Selby Watson - classical translator who killed his wife. Sentenced to death in 1872 but later commuted to life in prison.

== Byles the protectionist as seen in Sophisms of Free Trade ==
In Sophisms of Free Trade, John Byles championed protectionism against laissez faire. Industries do not spring up out of nowhere, and home markets needs protectionism to stave off foreign competition. Byles said, "But in truth the natural course of commercial affairs uninfluenced by legislation is impossible."

He could not conceive where England could have been at in 1851 without protectionism. He was convinced that new nations as well as old nations needed protectionism. He knew individuals and the private sector did not have the resources to create an immense future. Public wisdom had to do this monumental feat. Moreover, Byles called humanity the most profoundest cause. He stated that those who regard man in high esteem should not be subjected to unbridled foreign commerce. In sum, Byles saw protection as not a source of calamity and peril as free traders depicted it, but as a policy that spread industry and brought water, economic life where there was none.

Byles tells his readers what is the best part about Adam Smith. Smith's disciples never thought that it was better to encourage domestic commerce over foreign commerce. This would turn free trade upside down; and shake the very foundation of free trade. For example, in Book II, Chapter V, Adam Smith reveals that encouraging domestic commerce facilitates domestic industry more than foreign commerce. Thus supporting domestic commerce benefited domestic industry the best, and this best showed that an economy was strategically organized.

"The capital, which is employed in purchasing in one part of the country in order to sell in another, and the produce of the industry of that country generally replaces, by such operation, two distinct capitals that had both been employed in agriculture or manufacture of that country, and thereby enables them to continue that employment ... When both are the produce of domestic industry, it necessarily replaces by every such operation two distinct capitals, which had both been employed in supporting productive labor, and thereby enables them to continue that support. The capital, which sends Scotch manufactures to London, and which brings back English manufactures and corn to Edinburgh, necessarily replaces, by every such operations, two British capitals, which had both been employed in the agriculture or manufactures of Great Britain." "The capital employed in purchasing foreign goods for home consumption, when this purchase is made with the produce of domestic industry, replaces too by every such operation two distinct capitals, but one of them only is employed in supporting domestic industry, replaces by every such operation two distinct capitals, but one of them only is employed in supporting domestic industry. The capital that which sends British goods to Portugal, and brings back Portuguese goods to Great Britain, replaces by every such operation only one British Capital. The other is a Portuguese one. Though the returns therefore of the foreign trade of consumption should be as quick as those of the home trade, THE CAPITAL EMPLOYED IN IT GIVE BUT ONE HALF THE ENCOURAGEMENT TO THE INDUSTRY OR PRODUCTIVE LABOR OF THE COUNTRY."

These quotations of Adam Smith instruct that foreign trade will just give half the encouragement to domestic industry or the productive labor of the nation, but favoring domestic commerce will assist domestic industry in ways foreign commerce could not. This challenges the system of free trade, which is built upon cheap labor, and foreign commerce is the way to riches. Byles not only used Adam Smith to refute free trade, but he refuted McCulloch as well. McCulloch stated that buying foreign commodities encourages domestic industry as if you bought domestic goods.

Byles adopted the foreign policy of “America’s Benjamin Franklin’s Rules for reducing a Great Empire to a small one.” He called for England to give up all her colonies, but to keep India, and treat Indians the same way British subjects were, and to give India domestic commerce and development. He refuted Malthus, Ricardo, and McCulloch. He sided with Henry Carey's view that the least powerful soils are harnessed before the best ones are there by saying Ricardo was wrong. In addition, he echoed Carey's calling for having those that consume be nigh of the farmer to give him a home market that is better than a foreign one. Those that consume nigh to the farmer, will have an unfailing market, and like Carey said agriculture will become a science. Domestic commerce will flourish only when the economy is prudently organized and protectionism does this.

Byles also quotes a 1727 writing of Dean Swift, Jonathan Swift, and revealed how Swift knew how to organize an economy. Through and Through one can only conclude that Swift should be called a protectionist, Byles quotes Swift saying, “ One cause of a country’s thriving is the industry of the people in working up all their native commodities to the last…..The convenience of safe ports and havens to carry out their own goods as much manufactured, and bring those of others as little manufactured as the nature of mutual commerce will allow.”

== Books ==
- A Treatise on the Law of Bills of Exchange, Promissory Notes, Bank-Notes, and Cheques, 1829
- On the Usury Laws, 1846
- Sophisms Of Free-Trade And Popular Political Economy Examined, 1849.
- Foundations of Religion in the Mind and Heart of Man, 1875

== Arms ==
Coat of arms of John Barnard Byles

Crest
Out of a ducal coronet Or a lion's head erased per bend sinister crenellée Argent and Gules.
Escutcheon
Per bend sinister crenellée Argent and Gules.
