= James Botting =

English executioner

- Born: James Botting; 12 October 1783; Brighton, England
- Died: 1 October 1837 (aged 53); Hove, England
- Occupation: executioner
- Years active: 1817–1819
- Known for: hangman at Newgate Prison, London
- Notable work: executions: Cato Street conspiracy (1820), Henry Fauntleroy (1824)

There are obvious inconsistencies between this article and John Foxton, see talk page

Jemmy Botting (baptised 12 October 1783 – 1 October 1837) was an English executioner who was the hangman at Newgate Prison in London from 1817 to 1819, during which tenure he claimed to have hanged a total of 175 persons. He was succeeded by John Foxton, who was his assistant from 1818.

Born in Brighton, he died in Hove on 1 October 1837 after falling out of his wheelchair in the street. He was so hated that no-one came to his assistance.

His notable executions included the fraudster Henry Fauntleroy in 1824 and the five leaders of the Cato Street conspiracy in 1820. The latter execution was followed by the last legal public decapitation.
