= William Calcraft =

English executioner (1800-1879)

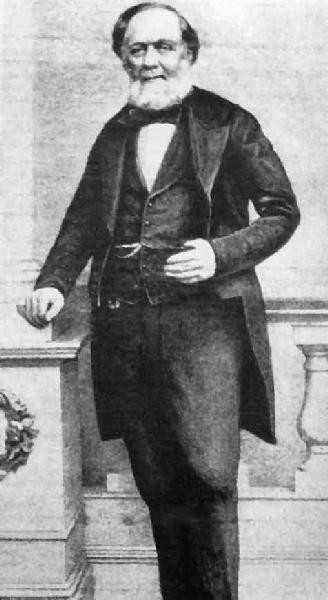
William Calcraft, c. 1870

William Calcraft (11 October 1800 – 13 December 1879) was an English hangman, one of the most prolific of British executioners. It is estimated in his 45-year career he carried out 450 executions.

A cobbler by trade, Calcraft was initially recruited to flog juvenile offenders held in Newgate Prison. While selling meat pies on streets around the prison, Calcraft met the City of London's hangman, John Foxton. After Foxton's death in 1829 the government appointed Calcraft the official Executioner for the City of London and Middlesex. His services were in great demand throughout England.

Nevertheless, some considered Calcraft incompetent, in particular for his controversial use of the short-drop hanging method in which the condemned were slowly strangled to death, instead of having their necks broken. Because with his methods the condemned took several minutes to die, to hasten death Calcraft would sometimes dramatically pull on legs or climb on shoulders in an effort to break the victim's neck. It has been speculated that he used these methods partly to entertain the crowds, sometimes numbering 30,000 spectators or more.

Executions in England were public until 1868. That year the law changed, mandating executions would take place privately and inside the prison. In 1868 Calcraft carried out the last public and first private executions. Among his executions were Marie Manning and her husband, the first husband and wife to be hanged together since 1700.

== Early life ==
Calcraft was born in Baddow, near Chelmsford, in 1800. He was a cobbler by trade, but had also worked as a nightwatchman at Reid's brewery in Clerkenwell, London. While attempting to earn a living by selling meat pies on the streets around Newgate Prison he made the acquaintance of John Foxton, who was the City of London's hangman for 40 years. That meeting led to his employment at Newgate to flog juvenile offenders, for which he was paid 10 shillings a week.

== Career as an executioner, 1829–1874 ==
William Calcraft in The Chronicles of Newgate

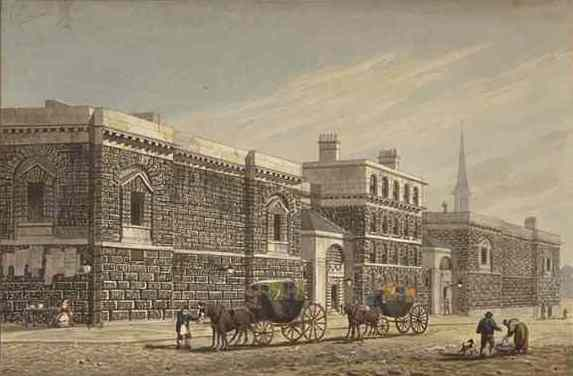
Newgate Prison in the mid-19th century. Between 1783 and 1868 all public executions in London took place on a temporary gallows erected in front of the prison.

Foxton died on 14 February 1829, and Calcraft was appointed as his successor. He was sworn in as the official Executioner for the City of London and Middlesex on 4 April 1829, a position for which he was paid one guinea a week plus an additional guinea for each execution. He also received an allowance for cats o' nine tails and birch rods, and supplemented his income by selling sections of the rope used to hang his victims, for which he charged between five shillings and £1 per inch. Calcraft's first duty in his new role was the execution of Thomas Lister and George Wingfield, hanged together on 27 March 1829, Lister for burglary and Wingfield for highway robbery. Esther Hibner, known in the press as the "Evil Monster", was the first woman hanged by Calcraft. She was executed on 13 April 1829, having been found guilty of starving to death her apprentice, Frances Colppits. Hibner did not go to the scaffold willingly, but had to be restrained in a straitjacket to prevent her from attacking her executioners. As she was hanged the watching crowd shouted out "Three cheers for the Hangman!"

Calcraft was "in great demand" as an executioner elsewhere in the country as well, such as at Reading Gaol. During his tenure of office the Capital Punishment Amendment Act 1868 was passed, requiring that all executions must be conducted in private. Calcraft carried out the last public execution in Britain on 26 May 1868, when he hanged the Fenian Michael Barrett in front of Newgate Prison for his part in the Clerkenwell Outrage. Calcraft also carried out the first private execution in Britain under the new law. Eighteen-year-old Thomas Wells, who had been convicted of the murder of his superior Edward Walshe, the stationmaster at Dover Priory railway station, was hanged on 13 August 1868 in a former timber yard inside Maidstone Gaol. Members of the press were allowed to attend and reported that Wells, who wore his railway porter's uniform, did not die quickly, "struggling on the end of the rope for several minutes". Calcraft's final official duty was the hanging of James Godwin, on 25 May 1874.

Reporting on Calcraft's visit to Dundee to perform an execution in that city in April 1873, The Times newspaper observed that "if their visitor had been a Royal personage, or an eminent statesman he could hardly have been treated with greater consideration". They further reported that Calcraft arrived with only one piece of hand luggage, a carpet bag containing "a new rope, a white cap, and some pinioning straps".

On 14th November 1864, Calcraft hanged Franz Müller outside Newgate Prison. Müller was convicted of murdering Thomas Briggs, a 69-year-old City of London banker, on 9th July 1864. The murder was the first ever carried out on a British train. Müller's execution was witnessed by 50,000 spectators.

The number of executions Calcraft carried out is unrecorded, but it has been estimated at 450, of whom 35 were women, making him one of the most active of British executioners. Among his better-known victims was François Courvoisier, executed on 6 July 1840 outside Newgate Prison. Courvoisier had been valet to Lord William Russell, and had murdered his master after being caught stealing silverware from the household.

Calcraft officiated at one of the very few executions of a husband and wife, and the first since 1700, when he hanged Marie Manning and her husband at Horsemonger Lane Gaol on 13 November 1849. The couple had murdered Marie's wealthy lover, Patrick O'Connor, with the aim of stealing his money. Calcraft also officiated at the last public execution of a woman in Britain, Frances Kidder, who was hanged on 2 April 1868. Convicted of drowning her stepdaughter, she was executed in front of a crowd of 2,000, amongst whom was reported to be her husband. After her drop of 3 feet (0.91 m) she struggled for "two or three minutes" before expiring.

=== Technique ===
At a quarter to 8 he [Mapp] was brought into the pinioning room, where the governor of the gaol formally handed him over to Calcraft ... Beyond a slight trembling of the limbs he displayed no sign of fear ... He walked steadily up the winding staircase to the tower on which the gallows was erected, and preserved his extraordinary firmness even on the drop while Calcraft was adjusting the rope. He said 'Good-bye' when Calcraft shook hands with him, and as he left him he turned his head as if about to speak, but at that moment the drop fell ... In turning his head round Mapp displaced the rope, and the noose was brought round almost under his chin, the consequence being that the fall not being immediately fatal, he struggled for half a minute before he died.

— Account of the execution on 9 April 1869 of John Mapp at Shrewsbury Gaol for the murder of a young girl, Catherine Lewis

Although Calcraft's career as a hangman spanned 45 years, he appears to have been "particularly incompetent", frequently having to "rush below the scaffold to pull on his victim's legs to hasten death". Those being hanged had their arms pinioned to their sides with leather straps before being walked to the gallows, where they were placed on a trapdoor and their heads and faces covered with a white cap, or hood. The purpose of the hood was to prevent the prisoner seeing the hangman pull the lever that released the trapdoor – and thus attempting to jump at the critical moment – and to hide from spectators any agony on the dying prisoner's face. After the noose had been secured around each victim's neck and the hangman had retired to a safe distance, the trapdoor was released. The bodies were left hanging for some time to ensure that death had occurred, before being lowered to the ground. Calcraft employed the short-drop method of execution, in which the drop through the trapdoor might be around 3 feet (0.91 m) or so. That was often insufficient to break the prisoner's neck, and therefore death was not always instantaneous, typically occurring slowly by strangulation. Historians Anthony Stokes and Theodore Dalrymple have suggested that Calcraft's "controversial" use of the short-drop allowed him a couple of minutes to entertain the large crowds of 30,000 plus that sometimes attended his public executions. "Renowned for his poor taste", he would sometimes swing from his victim's legs or climb onto their shoulders in an attempt to break their necks. In one of the first executions Calcraft carried out at the new Reading Gaol his victim, Thomas Jennings, took more than three minutes to die.

On 31 March 1856, Calcraft executed William Bousfield, but a threat he had received that he would be shot on the scaffold unnerved him. After releasing the bolt securing the trapdoor on which the condemned man was standing, Calcraft ran off, leaving Bousfield hanging; a few moments later Bousfield raised one of his legs to support himself on the platform. Calcraft's assistant tried to push the victim off, but Bousfield repeatedly succeeded in supporting himself. The officiating chaplain forced the frightened Calcraft to return to the scaffold, where he "threw himself around his [Bousfield's] legs and by the force of his weight finally succeeded in strangling him". Calcraft's bungling became the subject of a popular ballad.

Calcraft was also reportedly nervous of executing Fenians, because of threats he had received. On 22 November 1867 he officiated at the public execution of William Philip Allen, Michael Larkin, and Michael O'Brien, who became known as the Manchester Martyrs. The three Fenians had been found guilty of the murder of a police officer, and were hanged together. Most accounts claim that Allen died almost instantaneously from a broken neck, but Larkin and O'Brien were not so fortunate. A Catholic priest in attendance, Father Gadd, reported that:

The other two ropes, stretched taut and tense by their breathing twitching burdens, were in ominous and distracting movement. The hangman had bungled! ... Calcraft then descended into the pit and there finished what he could not accomplish from above. He killed Larkin.

Father Gadd refused to allow Calcraft to dispatch O'Brien in the same way, and so "for three-quarters of an hour the good priest [Father Gadd] knelt, holding the dying man's hands within his own, reciting the prayers for the dying. Then the long drawn out agony ended."

Towards the end of his career the feeling began to be expressed in the press that Calcraft's age was catching up with him. On 15 November 1869, aged 69, Calcraft executed Joseph Welsh, for murder, at Maidstone Gaol. Reporting on the execution The Times commented that "the adjustment of the rope was slow and bungling, and such as to show that Calcraft's age has unfitted him for his occupation".

== Later life ==
Calcraft in later years

By 1869 Calcraft's mother, Sarah, was living as a pauper in a workhouse at Hatfield Peverel near Chelmsford. Calcraft was ordered to pay 3 shillings a week towards her upkeep, to which he objected, arguing that his brother and sister should be made to help, and that he had three children of his own to support, although there is no record of his marriage.

After reluctantly being forced to retire from office because of old age in 1874, Calcraft received a pension of 25 shillings a week from the City of London and was succeeded as hangman by William Marwood. Although as a younger man Calcraft had been considered to be "genial", with a love of breeding rabbits, in his later years he was described as "surly and sinister-looking, with long hair and beard, in scruffy black attire and a fob chain".

Calcraft died at Poole Street in Hoxton, on 13 December 1879, aged 79 and is buried in Abney Park Cemetery, Stoke Newington. An obituary published in The New York Times on 1 January 1880 reported that "Several so-called biographies of Calcraft were published during his lifetime, but all are notable for a narrow stream of fact meandering through a broad meadow of commentary, and not one may be considered worthy of the subject or to be relied on for a strict accuracy of statement". The earliest of them was an octavo pamphlet published in 1846 entitled The Groans of the Gallows; or; The Past and Present Life of William Calcraft, the Living Hangman of Newgate.
