= Clerkenwell Prison =

Prison in Clerkenwell, London

Clerkenwell (old) Prison
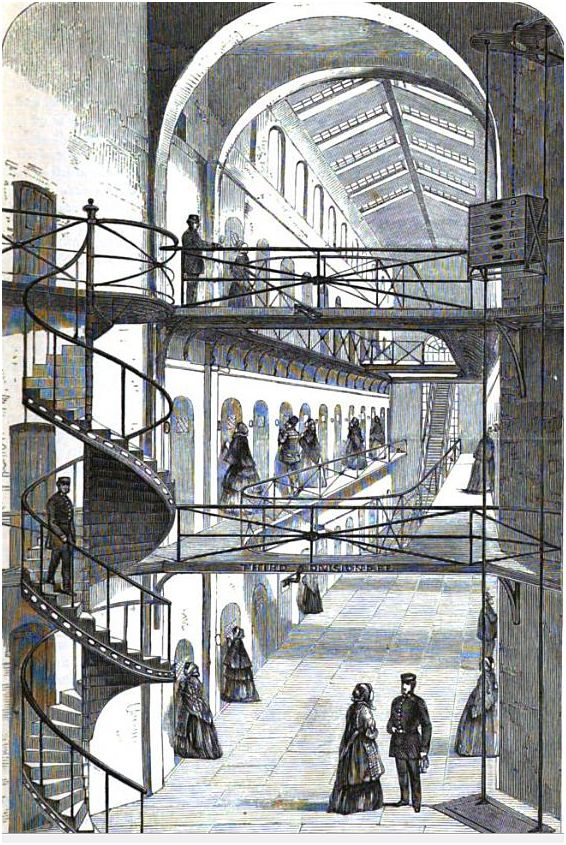
- Visiting time at the House of Detention, 1862
- Interactive map of Clerkenwell (old) Prison
- Location: St. James's Walk, Clerkenwell, London, England; 51°31′28″N 0°6′26″W
- Status: Closed
- Capacity: 240
- Population: 109 (1849)
- Opened: c. 1820

Notable prisoners
- Ricard O'Sullivan Burke

Clerkenwell (old) Prison, also known as the Clerkenwell House of Detention or Middlesex House of Detention was a prison in Clerkenwell, London, opened in 1847 and demolished in 1890. It held prisoners awaiting trial.

It stood on Bowling Green Lane conveniently close to the Middlesex Sessions House, where prisoners would be tried, on Clerkenwell Green to the south.

== History ==
The House of Detention was built on the site of two earlier prisons, the Clerkenwell Bridewell for convicted prisoners and the New Prison for those awaiting trial. The Bridewell closed in 1794 and its functions were taken over by the Coldbath Fields Prison at Mount Pleasant. The New Prison was rebuilt in 1818 and in 1847, at which time its name changed to the House of Detention. In London cant it was called The Tench, an abbreviation of Detention.

On 13 December 1867 its exercise yard was the target of a gunpowder explosion instigated by members of the Fenian Society in an attempt to aid the escape of Ricard O'Sullivan Burke, an arms supplier to the Fenians. The blast killed twelve bystanders and wounded 120 in Corporation Row; and the event became known as the "Clerkenwell Outrage". Some of those responsible were executed, with ringleader Michael Barrett becoming the last person to be publicly executed in London, on gallows outside Newgate Prison.

The prison was demolished in 1890. The site was then used for the Hugh Myddleton School, built in 1893 and closed in 1971. The school building has now been converted into flats. The 9,000 sq ft vaults beneath, dating from the prison era, and now known as the "Clerkenwell Catacombs", remained. They were reopened as air-raid shelters during the Blitz, and are occasionally opened, for instance during Clerkenwell Design Week. For a few years the vaults were open as a tourist attraction. Various film and television productions have been shot in the catacombs, including the 2009 movies Sherlock Holmes and St Trinian's 2: The Legend of Fritton's Gold, as well as episodes of Spooks and Secret Diary of a Call Girl.

== See also ==
- Coldbath Fields Prison, the Clerkenwell House of Correction
- Clerkenwell Bridewell
- New Prison
- Clerkenwell explosion of the Fenian Rising
