= Frances Kidder =

Last woman to be publicly hanged in Britain

Frances Kidder (c. 1843 – 2 April 1868) was the last woman to be publicly hanged in Britain. She was convicted of murdering her stepdaughter, Louisa Kidder-Staples.

== Crime ==
In 1865 Frances Turner married William Kidder, the father of her illegitimate child. She discovered only afterwards that he had another child, Louisa. A neighbour reported that when her husband was away, he could often hear Kidder beating her new stepdaughter.

In August 1867, Kidder was visiting her parents at New Romney. She took Louisa (then aged eleven) out on a walk, but returned to the house alone, claiming that the girl had fallen accidentally into a ditch. Her mother and husband found her behaviour suspicious, and she was quickly taken into police custody. A search was made for Louisa, whose body was soon found lying in a pool of water in a ditch.

Kidder was remanded in custody until her trial could take place at the Kent Spring Assize, where she was convicted of murder on 12 March 1868. During the trial witnesses (including her mother, father, husband and sister) gave damaging evidence about her hatred for Louisa. The jury, directed by Mr Justice Byles, returned their guilty verdict in only 12 minutes, concluding that she had deliberately drowned Louisa. She later admitted that she had indeed murdered the girl, although she claimed that it was not premeditated.

Kidder was executed in front of Maidstone Gaol at 12 noon on 2 April 1868, aged twenty-five. Around 2,000 people, including her husband (who was by this time living with her sister), are reported to have witnessed the execution performed by hangman William Calcraft.
