= John Foxen =

English executioner (1769-1829)

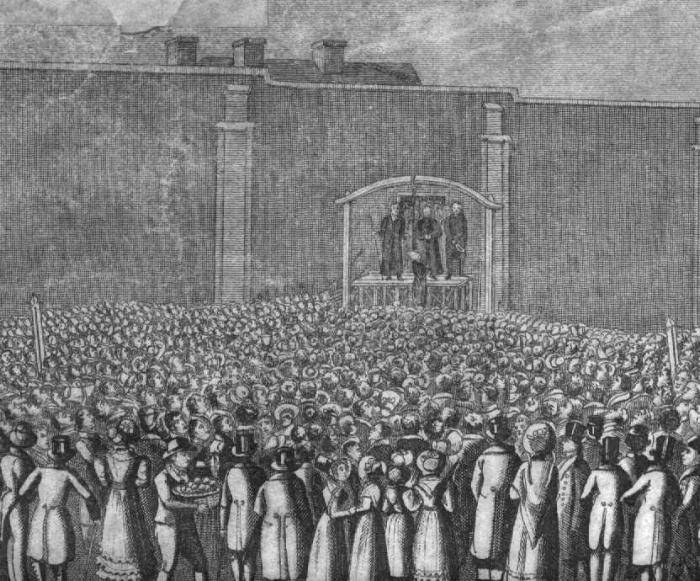
The execution of William Corder by John Foxton in 1828

John Foxen (c. 1769 – 14 February 1829), often referred to as J. Foxton or by the occupational moniker for his position, Jack Ketch, was an English hangman during the early 19th century. In 1818, at the age of about 50 years, Foxen became the hangman at Newgate Prison in London. Before that, he had assisted his predecessor in that post, James Botting.

Foxen hanged 206 men and 6 women over the next 11 years. His most celebrated hanging was of the five Cato Street Conspirators on 1 May 1820, assisting Botting. They had been convicted of conspiring to murder several members of the Cabinet. They were the last to suffer hanging and beheading in Great Britain. They were here assisted by Thomas Cheshire and a further helper who cut off the traitors' heads. Another of his notable hangings was John Thurtell.

On 13 May 1828, while living at 19 Booth Street in Hoxton, Foxen petitioned the Court of Aldermen for a pension. He claimed weakness in his lungs from having performed his duties in foul weather, and was bedridden. Being illiterate, he signed the petition with an ''X''.

Three months after his petition, Foxen was well enough to hang William Corder in Suffolk. Foxen claimed Corder's trousers and stockings by right.

Foxen's last notable hanging was that of Quaker Joseph Hunton, who was convicted of forgery after a trial at the Old Bailey. Foxen executed Hunton, along with three others, in December 1828.

Upon his death in 1829, Foxen's former assistant William Calcraft succeeded Foxen as Newgate Prison's hangman.
