= Walter Byles =

English cricketer and barrister

Personal information
- Full name: Walter Barnard Byles
- Born: 8 August 1840; Royston, Hertfordshire, England
- Died: 12 November 1921 (aged 81); Uxbridge, Middlesex, England

Domestic team information
- Years: Team
- 1862: Oxford University

Career statistics
| Competition | First-class |
|---|---|
| Matches | 1 |
| Runs scored | 31 |
| Batting average | 31.00 |
| 100s/50s | –/– |
| Top score | 31 |
| Catches/stumpings | –/– |
- Source: Cricinfo, 8 January 2020

Walter Barnard Byles (8 August 1840 – 12 November 1921) was an English first-class cricketer and barrister.

The son of Sir John Barnard Byles and Emma Nash Wedd, he was born in August 1840 at Royston, Hertfordshire. He was educated at Rugby School, before going up to University College, Oxford. While studying at Oxford, Byles made a single appearance in first-class cricket for Oxford University against the Gentlemen of England at Lord's in 1862. Batting once in the match, he was dismissed for 31 runs in the Oxford first-innings by Henry Plowden. A student of the Inner Temple, he was called to the bar in January 1866. He served as a barrister on the South-Eastern Circuit. Byles later served as a Sheriff of Middlesex in 1896. He died at Uxbridge in November 1921.
