= Capital Punishment Amendment Act 1868 =

Act of the Parliament of the United Kingdom

Capital Punishment Amendment Act 1868 (Note: Section 1.)
- Act of Parliament
- Parliament of the United Kingdom
- Long title: An Act to provide for carrying out of Capital Punishment within Prisons.
- Citation: 31 & 32 Vict. c. 24
- Territorial extent: United Kingdom

Dates
- Royal assent: 29 May 1868
- Commencement: 29 May 1868 (Note: The Acts of Parliament (Commencement) Act 1793.)
- Repealed: 9 November 1998
Other legislation
| Amended by | Coroners Act 1887; False Oaths (Scotland) Act 1933; Homicide Act 1957; Northern Ireland (Emergency Provisions) Act 1973; Statute Law (Repeals) Act 1989 |
| Repealed by | Murder (Abolition of Death Penalty) Act 1965 ("except as applied by any other enactment"); Human Rights Act 1998 |

Status: Repealed

Text of statute as originally enacted

Revised text of statute as amended

The Capital Punishment Amendment Act 1868 (31 & 32 Vict. c. 24) was an act of the Parliament of the United Kingdom. The act received royal assent on 29 May 1868, putting an end to public executions for murder in the United Kingdom. The act required that all prisoners sentenced to death for murder be executed within the walls of the prison in which they were being held, and that their bodies be buried in the prison grounds. It was prompted at least in part by the efforts of reformers such as Sir Robert Peel and Charles Dickens, who called in the national press for an end to the "grotesque spectacle" of public executions. Abolition of public executions was one of the recommendations of the Royal Commission on Capital Punishment 1864-1866. A similar measure, the Capital Punishment within Prisons Bill, had been introduced in 1867, but failed for lack of parliamentary time.

The first execution under the new law was carried out by William Calcraft on 13 August 1868 at Maidstone Gaol; 18-year-old Thomas Wells was hanged for the murder of Edward Walshe, the stationmaster at Dover Priory railway station. Calcraft had previously carried out the last public execution in the UK, when he hanged the Fenian Michael Barrett in front of Newgate Prison on 26 May 1868 for his part in the 1867 Clerkenwell Outrage.

The act applied only to prisoners "sentenced on any indictment or inquisition for murder" and not those convicted of other offences carrying the death penalty (such as high treason). In theory, therefore, those convicted of such offences could be executed in public up until the final abolition of capital punishment in the United Kingdom in 1998. In practice, however, all executions for treason during the 20th century were carried out within prison walls.

== See also ==
- Capital punishment in the United Kingdom

== Bibliography ==
- Fielding, Steve (1994), Hangman's Record 1868–1899, vol. 1, Chancery House, ISBN 978-0-900246-65-4
- Fielding, Steve (2008), The Executioner's Bible: The Story of Every British Hangman of the Twentieth Century, John Blake Publishing, ISBN 978-1-84454-648-0
- McConville, Seán (1995), English local prisons, 1860–1900: next only to death, Routledge, ISBN 978-0-415-03295-7
- Pratt, John (2002), Punishment and Civilization: Penal Tolerance and Intolerance in Modern Society, Sage Publications, ISBN 978-0-7619-4753-0
