= Catherine Wilson =

English murderer (1822–1862)

- Born: c. 1822; United Kingdom of Great Britain and Ireland
- Died: 20 October 1862 (aged 39/40); Newgate Prison, London, England
- Cause of death: Execution by hanging
- Occupation: Nurse
- Spouse: Dixon
- Conviction: Murder
- Penalty: Death

Details
- Victims: Maria Soames
- Date: 1856
- Weapon: Poison

Catherine Wilson (c. 1822 – 20 October 1862) was a British murderer who was hanged for one murder, but was generally thought at the time to have committed six others. She worked as a nurse and poisoned her victims after encouraging them to leave their money to her in their wills. She was described privately by the sentencing judge as "the greatest criminal that ever lived".

== Crimes ==
Wilson worked as a nurse, first in Spalding, Lincolnshire, and then moving to Kirkby Lonsdale, Cumbria. She married a man called Dixon but her husband soon died, probably poisoned with colchicum, a bottle of which was found in his room. The doctor recommended an autopsy but Wilson begged him not to perform it, and he backed down.

In 1862 Wilson worked as a live-in nurse, nursing a Mrs Sarah Carnell, who rewrote her will in favour of Wilson; soon afterwards, Wilson brought her a "soothing draught", saying "Drink it down, love, it will warm you." Carnell took a mouthful and spat it out, complaining that it had burned her mouth. Later it was noticed that a hole had been burned in the bed clothes by the liquid. Wilson then fled to London, but was arrested a couple of days later.

== First trial ==
The drink she had given to Carnell turned out to contain sulphuric acid – enough to kill 50 people. Wilson claimed that the acid had been mistakenly given to her by the pharmacist who prepared the medicine. She was tried for attempted murder but acquitted. The judge, Lord Bramwell, in the words of Wilson's lawyer Montagu Williams, Q.C., "pointed out that the theory of the defence was an untenable one, as, had the bottle contained the poison when the prisoner received it, it would have become red-hot or would have burst, before she arrived at the invalid's bedside. However, there is no accounting for juries and, at the end of the Judge's summing-up, to the astonishment probably of almost everybody in Court" she was found not guilty.

When Wilson left the dock, she was immediately rearrested, as the police had continued their investigations into Wilson and had exhumed the bodies of some former patients. She was charged with the murder of seven former patients, but tried on just one, Mrs Maria Soames, who died in 1856. Wilson denied all the charges.

== Second trial ==
Wilson was tried on 25 September 1862 before Mr Justice Byles, again defended by Montagu Williams. During the trial, it was alleged that seven people with whom Wilson had lived as a nurse had died after rewriting their Wills to leave her some money, but this evidence was not admitted. Almost all had suffered from gout. Evidence of colchicine poisoning was given by toxicologist Alfred Swaine Taylor, the defence being that the poison could not be reliably detected after so long. In summing up, the judge said to the jury: "Gentlemen, if such a state of things as this were allowed to exist no living person could sit down to a meal in safety". Wilson was found guilty and sentenced to hang. A crowd of 20,000 turned out to see her execution at Newgate Gaol on 20 October 1862. She was the last woman to be publicly hanged in London.

After the trial, Byles asked Williams to come to his chambers, where he told him: "I sent for you to tell you that you did that case remarkably well, but it was no good; the facts were too strong. I prosecuted Rush for the murder of Mr Jermy, I defended Daniel Good, and I defended several other notable criminals when I was on the Norfolk Circuit, but if it will be of any satisfaction to you, I may tell you that in my opinion you have to-day defended the greatest criminal that ever lived."

== Public reaction to crimes ==
Wilson's punishment, the first death sentence handed down to a woman by the Central Criminal Court in 14 years, drew little condemnation. In the view of Harper's Weekly, "From the age of fourteen to that of forty-three her career was one of undeviating yet complex vice [...] She was as foul in life as bloody in hand, and she seems not to have spared the poison draught even to the partners of her adultery and sensuality. Hers was an undeviating career of the foulest personal vices and the most cold-blooded and systematic murders, as well as deliberate and treacherous robberies." It was generally thought that Wilson was guilty of more crimes than the one she was convicted of. Harper's went on:

We speak without hesitation of her crimes as plural, because, adopting the language of Mr. Justice Byles with reference to the death of Mrs Soames, we not only "never heard of a case in which it was more clearly proved that murder had been committed, and where the excruciating pain and agony of the victim were watched with so much deliberation by the murderer," but also because the same high judicial authority, having access to the depositions in another case, pronounced, in words of unexampled gravity and significance, "that he had no more doubt but that Mrs Atkinson was also murdered by Catherine Wilson than if he had seen the crime committed with his own eyes." Nor did these two murders comprise the catalogue of her crimes. That she, who poisoned her paramour Mawer, again poisoned a second lover, one Dixon, robbed and poisoned Mrs Jackson, attempted the life of a third paramour named Taylor, and administered sulphuric acid to a woman in whose house she was a lodger, only in the present year – of all this there seems to be no reasonable doubt, though these several cases have received no regular criminal inquiry. Seven murders known, if not judicially proved, do not after all, perhaps, complete Catherine Wilson's evil career. And if any thing were wanted to add to the magnitude of these crimes it would be found, not only in the artful and devilish facility with which she slid herself into the confidence of the widow and the unprotected – not only in the slow, gradual way in which she first sucked out the substance of her victims before she administered, with fiendish coolness, the successive cups of death under the sacred character of friend and nurse – but in the atrocious malignity by which she sought to destroy the character and reputation of the poor creatures, and to fix the ignominy of suicide on the objects of her own robbery and murder.

== See also ==
- John Bodkin Adams
- Dorothea Waddingham
- List of serial killers by country
