= John Selby Watson =

British clergyman, classical translator and murderer (1804–1884)

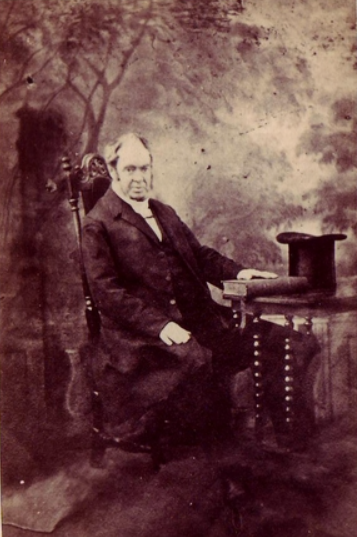
John Selby Watson

The Reverend John Selby Watson (April 1804 – 6 July 1884) was a British classical translator and murderer. He was sentenced to death in 1872 for killing his wife, but a public outcry led to his sentence being reduced to life imprisonment. The case is notable for Watson's use of a plea of insanity as his defence, bringing "the insanity defense into perhaps its greatest prominence since M'Naghten."

== Career ==
Watson was born at Crayford. He was educated by an uncle and graduated from Trinity College, Dublin in 1838. He was ordained Deacon by the Bishop of Ely in 1839 and married Anne Armstrong in January 1845 at St. Marks, Dublin. Due to his poverty Watson had been engaged to Anne for quite a number of years before they could marry. He moved to London in 1844 where he became the headmaster of Stockwell Grammar School. Because of falling pupil numbers he was laid off in 1870. But during his long career as headmaster, Watson had made a reputation for himself as a scholar and translator, publishing translations of the classics for Bohn's Classical Library that subsequently became volumes in the popular Everyman's Library series. He also wrote biographies, religious books, and a volume Reasoning Power in Animals. Still with all his learning and activities he made a very small income. When the Board of the Stockwell School fired him, they refused to give him any pension.

== Crime ==
A few weeks after finishing his four-volume History of the Papacy to the Reformation, on 8 October 1871 Watson was found unconscious by his servant, Ellen Pyne, having taken prussic acid. Two notes were found: one addressed to Pyne contained her wages. The other was to his doctor. It said "I have killed my wife in a fit of rage to which she provoked me". His wife's body was found in a bedroom, having been battered to death with the butt of his pistol two days earlier.

== Trial ==
Watson recovered and stood trial at the Old Bailey in January 1872. Despite a history of arguing with his wife, Watson did not argue provocation. Instead, he pleaded insanity, as his counsel put it: "an antecedent improbability in the deed which would lead everyone in the first instance to seek an explanation in insanity." The judge, Mr Justice Byles, opposed this excuse strongly in his summing-up. After deliberating for an hour and a half, the jury found him guilty of murder but with a recommendation that mercy be shown because of his age and previous character. Byles however sentenced him to death.

After the trial many affidavits from doctors were presented testifying to Watson's insanity at the time of the murder. Byles then changed his mind and told the Home Secretary that the medical evidence presented at the trial suggested that "this is not a case in which the sentence should be carried out." After more investigation the Home Office decided that some "imprecise mental unsoundness" had been present and commuted the sentence to life imprisonment. Due to no obvious signs of madness, however, he was not sent to Broadmoor Hospital, instead he served his time in Parkhurst prison where he died twelve years later, aged 80, on 6 July 1884. His death was due to falling out of his hammock at the prison. In the words of Martin J. Wiener, "the incongruity of the offense and the lack of any lesser defense pushed the system to a controversial finding of "temporary" insanity to prevent the unedifying spectacle of the hanging of a clergyman of the Church of England. In a sense, in Watson's case, provocation (by his wife, under the stress of his forced retirement) had been reconceived as temporary insanity."

The crime became the basis for the 1984 speculative historical book Watson's Apology by Beryl Bainbridge.

=== Original works ===
- The Life of George Fox, the Founder of the Quakers
- Biographies of John Wilkes and William Cobbett
- The Reasoning Power in Animals, 1867

=== Translations ===
- Anabasis by Xenophon
- Xenophon's Minor Works: Literally Translated from the Greed with Notes and Illustrations
- Conspiracy of Catiline and the Jugurthine War by Sallust
- On the Nature of Things by Lucretius Carus
- Lives of Eminent Commanders by Cornelius Nepos
- Historia Philippicae et Totius Mundi Origines et Terrae Situs by Justin, 1853
- Cicero on Oratory and Orators by Marcus Tullius Cicero, 1855
- Institutes of Oratory by Quintilian, 1856
