= John Thurtell =

English boxing promoter and convicted murderer (1793-1824)

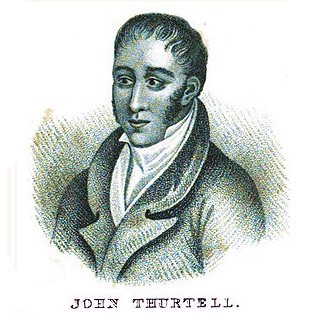
- Portrait of John Thurtell, 1824
- Born: 21 December 1793; Bradwell, Suffolk, England, U.K.
- Died: 9 January 1824 (aged 30); Hertford, Hertfordshire, England
- Motive: Gambling debt
- Conviction: Murder
- Trial: Radlett murder
- Penalty: Death by hanging
- Accomplices: Joseph Hunt; William Probert

Details
- Victims: William Weare
- Date: 24 October 1823
- Locations: Radlett, Hertfordshire, England
- Killed: 1
- Imprisoned at: Hertford Prison

John Thurtell (21 December 1793 – 9 January 1824) was an English sports promoter, amateur boxer, Royal Marine officer and convicted murderer.

== Early life ==
Thurtell was born In Bradwell, Suffolk, England, on 21 December 1793. He was the second surviving son of Thomas Thurtell (1765–1846), who later served as Mayor of Norwich from 1828 to 1829. His father wanted him to work in the family business, but John left to join the Royal Marines, serving in the Napoleonic Wars on HMS Bellona from 1812 to 1814. He then set up a business in Norwich manufacturing bombazine, but this failed, and Thurtell moved to London, setting up a tavern in Long Acre in 1822.

== Boxing ==
Thurtell achieved fame as a boxing promoter. He organised the fight between Ned Painter and Tom Oliver in 1814.

George Borrow describes how when he was 14 (in c.1817) he saw Thurtell:

The terrible Thurtell was present, lord of the concourse; for wherever he moved he was master, and whenever he spoke, even when in chains, every other voice was silent. He stood on the mead, grim and pale as usual, with his bruisers around.

In 1822, William Hazlitt wrote an essay for The New Monthly Magazine called "The Fight"; in it he described Thurtell under the name "Tom Turtle".

== Murder of William Weare ==
Thurtell became a notorious gambler. He owed William Weare, a solicitor of Lyon's Inn, a gambling debt of £300, which he believed Weare had gained by cheating at blind hookey. When Weare demanded the money, Thurtell decided to murder him rather than pay up. Thurtell invited Weare to join him and his friends – Joseph Hunt and William Probert – for a weekend of gambling in Radlett, Hertfordshire. On 24 October 1823, as they journeyed from London in Thurtell's horse-drawn gig, Thurtell shot Weare in the face with a flintlock muff pistol. This failed to kill him, so Thurtell slit his throat with a knife before driving the pistol into his head with such force that his brains were dashed over the ground. The trial attracted great publicity. Thurtell was found guilty and hanged on 9 January 1824 at Hertford Prison.

== Legacy ==
A waxwork of Thurtell's body was displayed in Madame Tussauds for 150 years. Thomas De Quincey's satirical 1827 essay "On Murder Considered as one of the Fine Arts" discusses Thurtell, as do several of Thomas Carlyle's works and letters. In William Powell Frith's painting The Derby Day (1856), Thurtell can be seen in the middle of the crowd, clad in green and clutching a banknote.
