= Michael Barrett (Fenian) =

Irish member of the Fenian Brotherhood (1841–1868)

- Born: 1841; Ederney, County Fermanagh, Ireland
- Died: 26 May 1868 (aged 26–27); Newgate Prison, London
- Cause of death: Executed by hanging
- Resting place: City of London Cemetery
- Known for: Involvement in the Clerkenwell explosion and being the last person publicly executed in England
- Criminal penalty: Death

Michael Barrett (1841 – 26 May 1868) was an Irish activist. He was a member of the Fenians.

Barrett was the last man to be publicly hanged in England, for his part in the Clerkenwell explosion in December 1867. The bombing killed 12 bystanders and severely injured many more. Barrett was arrested with several others in a wide-ranging sweep of sympathisers with the Irish Republican cause and was the only one found guilty.

== Background ==
Barrett was born in Drumnagreshial in the Ederney area of County Fermanagh. As a young man and in search of work, he moved to Glasgow. At the age of 27 he joined the Irish Republican Brotherhood, also known as the Fenians. which, in the 1860s was a political movement that defied the Catholic Church, middle-class nationalists who advocated milder approaches, and Irish Unionists. Tens of thousands of Irishmen in both Ireland and Great Britain were recruited into its ranks.

== Clerkenwell explosion ==
The Clerkenwell bombing was the most infamous action carried out by the Fenians in Britain. It resulted in a long-lived backlash that fomented much hostility against the Irish community in Britain.

The events that led up to the bombing started with the arrest, in November 1867, of Ricard O'Sullivan Burke, a senior Fenian arms agent who planned the "prison-van escape" in Manchester a few months earlier. O'Sullivan-Burke was subsequently imprisoned on remand in the Middlesex House of Detention, Clerkenwell. On 13 December an attempt to rescue him was made by blowing a hole in the prison wall. The explosion was seriously misjudged; it demolished not only a large section of the wall, but also a number of tenement houses opposite in Corporation Lane (now Corporation Row), killing 12 people and wounding up to 120 more.

The bombing had a traumatic effect on British working-class opinion. Karl Marx, then living in London, observed:

The London masses, who have shown great sympathy towards Ireland, will be made wild and driven into the arms of a reactionary government. One cannot expect the London proletarians to allow themselves to be blown up in honour of Fenian emissaries.

The Radical, Charles Bradlaugh, condemned the incident in his newspaper The National Reformer as an act "calculated to destroy all sympathy, and to evoke the opposition of all classes".

The day before the explosion, the Prime Minister, Benjamin Disraeli, had banned all political demonstrations in London in an attempt to put a stop to the weekly meetings and marches that were being held in support of the Fenians. He had feared that the ban might be challenged, but the explosion had the effect of turning public opinion in his favour.

== Arrest and trial ==
Months earlier, Barrett had been arrested in Glasgow for illegally discharging a firearm and allegedly false evidence was used to implicate him in the Clerkenwell Prison explosion.

In court, he produced witnesses who testified that he had been in Scotland on the date of the incident. The main case against him rested on the evidence of Patrick Mullany (a Dubliner known to have given false testimony before and whose price was a free passage to Australia), who told the court that Barrett had informed him that he had carried out the explosion with an accomplice by the name of Murphy. After two hours of deliberation the jury pronounced Barrett guilty.

One of the trial lawyers, Montagu Williams, wrote:

On looking at the dock, one's attention was attracted by the appearance of Barrett, for whom I must confess I felt great commiseration. He was a square-built fellow, scarcely five feet eight in height and dressed like a well-to-do farmer. This resemblance was increased by the frank, open, expression on his face. A less murderous countenance than Barrett's I have not seen. Good humour was latent in his every feature and he took the greatest interest in the proceedings.

On being asked if he had anything to say before sentence was passed, Barrett delivered an emotional speech from the dock, which ended:

I am far from denying, nor will the force of circumstances compel me to deny my love of my native land. I love my country and if it is murderous to love Ireland dearer than I love my life, then it is true, I am a murderer. If my life were ten times dearer than it is and if I could by any means, redress the wrongs of that persecuted land by the sacrifice of my life, I would willingly and gladly do so".

The next day the Daily Telegraph reported that Barrett had:

... delivered a most remarkable speech, criticising with great acuteness the evidence against him, protesting that he had been condemned on insufficient grounds, and eloquently asserting his innocence.

== Execution ==
Many people, including a number of Radical MPs, pressed for clemency. In Fermanagh, Barrett's aged mother walked several miles in the snow to appeal to the local Conservative MP, Captain Archdale, a staunch Orangeman, who rejected her.

Barrett was executed outside the walls of Newgate Prison on 26 May 1868 before a crowd of two thousand who booed, jeered and sang "Rule Britannia" and "Champagne Charlie" as his body dropped.

On 27 May, following the execution, Reynold's News commented:

Millions will continue to doubt that a guilty man has been hanged at all; and the future historian of the Fenian panic may declare that Michael Barrett was sacrificed to the exigencies of the police, and the vindication of the good Tory principle, that there is nothing like blood.

Barrett's execution was the last public hanging to take place in England. The hangman was William Calcraft.

Until their transfer to the City of London Cemetery, Michael Barrett's remains lay for 35 years in a lime grave inside the walls of Newgate Prison. When the prison was demolished in 1903 his remains were taken to their present resting place. Today the grave is a place of Fenian pilgrimage and is marked by a small plaque.

== Aftermath of the explosion ==
After the explosion the Prime Minister Benjamin Disraeli advocated the suspension of the Habeas Corpus Act in Great Britain, as was already the case in Ireland. Greater security measures were quickly introduced. Thousands of special constables were enrolled to aid the police and at Scotland Yard a special secret service department was established to meet the Fenian threat. Although a number of people were arrested and brought to trial, Michael Barrett was the only one to receive the death sentence.

Within days of the explosion, the Liberal leader, William Ewart Gladstone, then in opposition, announced his concern about Irish Nationalist grievances and said that it was the duty of the British people to remove them. Later, he said that it was the Fenian action at Clerkenwell that turned his mind towards Home Rule. When Gladstone discovered at Hawarden later that year that Queen Victoria had invited him to form a government he famously stated, "my mission is to pacify Ireland".
