= Lancelot Cooper =

19th-century English fraudster

Lancelot Cooper (c.1775 — unknown) was a prolific English fraudster and conman of the early 19th century. According to a transcript of Australian convict records, he was born in Hackness, North Yorkshire.

== Naval career ==
In Cooper's petition to the Home Secretary, written in 1827, he wrote that he entered the Royal Navy in 1799 as a "writer in the Admin. Office" on the ship Zealand, a depot ship moored on the Thames, through the interest of Sir George Cayley Bart of Brompton, North Yorkshire which if true suggests that his family had some standing in the area. In 1801, Cooper joined the Medusa, a 38-gun frigate, as secretary (or clerk) to Captain John Gore. During the following five years, Medusa ventured on a number of voyages and saw action, taking a number of Spanish prizes. In February 1806, Cooper was transferred with his captain (knighted and rich from prize money) to Revenge, a ship of the line. For the next two-and-a-half years, Cooper spent much of his time on Revenge which was blockading enemy ports and, when Gore temporarily retired in August 1808 due to ill health, Cooper was given two good-conduct certificates by Gore (found in his possession when arrested). This led to a promotion as purser, first in the sloop Pelorus and later in the frigate Orpheus. In early 1811, when Cooper returned home, he was appointed as purser to the receiving ship Princess moored in the Mersey.

== Crime and deception ==
Cracks soon began to appear in Cooper's 'good conduct'. In July 1813, John Wilson Croker, Secretary to the Admiralty, instigated an enquiry which reported that "from the victualling book of Lancelot Cooper... 70 men appeared discharged... to the Intelligent Gun Brig in July 1812 although their victualling is claimed by Mr Cooper". As a result, Cooper was dismissed from the Royal Navy for misconduct. In his petition Cooper makes no mention of his disgrace stating "he remained in her (the Princess) until the fall of 1813". He then asserts that he embarked on a Royal Navy ship from Plymouth carrying dispatches to Admiral Sir John Gore, who was blockading Venice, then under French rule. When he reached Gore, as Napoleon had just abdicated, he was asked by Gore to go ashore and liaise with the Austrian authorities as His Britannic Majesty's Consul. This version was later contradicted by Gore in a letter to William Powell in 1825 in which Gore stated that Cooper had arrived on his ship, asked to be reinstated as secretary which was refused, and was put ashore without further delay. Notwithstanding this true version of events, Cooper did indeed manage to convince the Austrians that he was the newly appointed Consul and evidence for this is provided by a letter written by John FitzGibbon, 2nd Earl of Clare (1792-1851) to an unknown recipient from Whitehall on 25 April (1827):

"My Dear Lord, Will you meet me for a few minutes today or tomorrow. I wish to speak to you on the subject of an unfortunate man who has written to me from Newgate with whose case I am not acquainted. His name is Cooper and I knew him when he was Consul at Venice. Yours faithfully Clare."

The concluding pages of Cooper's petition relate the history of his dealings with British and foreign representatives as Consul in Venice and later as Consul in Ragusa, Sicily, but there is no independent evidence as to the veracity of these claims. He finishes by stating that, in the summer of 1817, he and "his family" were forced to flee from Ragusa due to the plague.

In November 1825, a notice appeared in The Times newspaper inserted by a John Powell asking for help to locate a Captain Thomas Cole RN, who had been living at a hotel in Dublin for six months, having married a daughter of "a respectable family". The notice states that after promising his wife and sister-in-law that they were going to his home in Yorkshire, he had crossed the Irish Sea and travelled by "post with four horses" to Birkenhead, where he had left them and was never seen again. Captain Thomas Cole was in fact an alias of Lancelot Cooper, as revealed in an 1827 article in The Times which dealt with Cooper's misdemeanor.

It is not known where Cooper had spent the intervening years but it could have been in the US, as an American passport in the name of Allison was found on him when he was arrested. When Cooper returned to Great Britain, he embarked on a life of crime, forging cheques under a number of aliases by ingratiating himself with families and businesses. One unfortunate family were the Powells: William Powell (a relative of John ) wrote to the Home Secretary in May 1827 begging that Cooper should not be granted mercy. Powell described how 'Cole' ingratiated himself with Powell and eventually married his daughter Grace in May 1825. He then lived with her in style, getting money by forging cheques on a Bank in London. Realising he was about to be exposed, he then fled with the two women, only to abandon them with Grace already pregnant. Following this episode, Cooper fled to London, where for a year and a half he lived at various addresses and passed a number of false cheques for cash or jewellery. Aliases during this time included Allison, Jackson, Croften, Cook, Cope, and Cottage. He may have been trying to gain the affection of at least one other lady, as a ticket for a private theatre box was found in his trunk when arrested. Eventually the law caught up with him in March 1827 and he was detained in Newgate Prison.

== Trial and transportation ==
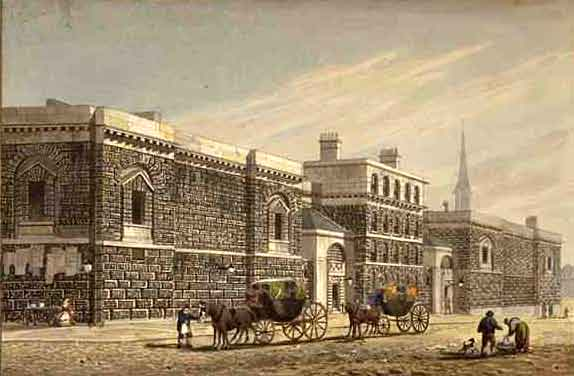
Newgate Prison by George Shepherd

Cooper was tried at the Old Bailey on 5 April 1827 before Lord Chief Justice Abbott on one count of fraud perpetrated on 26 March of that year (although other alleged offences were described) and being found guilty he was sentenced to death. Incarcerated in Newgate Prison, Cooper, as custom allowed, wrote a petition accompanied by references from people in authority to the Home Secretary William Sturges Bourne pleading for mercy. and when completed it was signed by the Earl of Clare as well as himself. Surprisingly, given his offences, at the Report in Council on 23 May 1827, his sentence was reduced to transportation for life. This result together with the offences which he was said to have committed was duly reported in the Times article of 1827. After a period of incarceration in the prison hulks on the Thames, Cooper was transported aboard the Asia V to Van Diemen's Land (Tasmania) on 17 August that year. Describing himself as a widower his conduct on the voyage was exemplary according to the Records. On Arrival at Van Diemen's Land in December 1827 he was required, as was the custom, to initially assist with the building of roads and other public works but at the end of 1833 he was given the opportunity to establish an independent life through a conditional pardon.

== Notes ==
The petition submitted in a plea for mercy is the main source of information about the first half of Cooper's life. Collaboration for his account of the beginning of his naval career include the good-conduct certificates written by Sir John Gore and letters of recommendation accompanying the petition from captains of other ships in which he served. The latter part of his petition is probably false with the exception of his self-appointment as Consul in Venice. One further clue about the truth is found in The Times of 1827. In it the reporter states that "amongst his papers was found a letter written in French and addressed to the Princess Charlotte of Wales in the handwriting of the late...Queen Caroline. It contains a...request that the princess would use her interest to induce Lord Castlereagh to restore the bearer in the situation of consul of Venice". This letter suggests that Cooper was forced to relinquish the post of Consul but does not give any information as to how long he had this position. There are also other mysteries remaining about his life, particularly his early years, the gap between approximately 1817 and 1825 and the year of his death. Finally there is the question of his physical features and perceived character. His appearance was unremarkable as during his trial he was described as being "about 5ft 9in in height, stout made, bald at top and before and a strong north country dialect". However, his manner must have convinced as William Powell wrote that "the world could not produce a more religious, charitable and humane man, nor one on whom I could with more safety bestow the hand of my child"
