= Henry Fauntleroy =

English banker and forger (1784–1824)

Henry Fauntleroy (12 October 1784 – 30 November 1824) was an English banker and forger.

After seven years as a clerk in the London bank of Marsh, Sibbald & Co., of which his father was one of the founders, he was taken into partnership, and the whole business of the firm was left in his hands. In 1824, the bank suspended payment. Fauntleroy was arrested on the charge of appropriating trust funds by forging the trustees' signatures and was committed for trial. It was freely rumoured that he had appropriated £250,000, which he had squandered in debauchery. He was tried at the Old Bailey, and, the case against him having been proved, he admitted his guilt but pleaded that he had used the misappropriated funds to pay his firm's debts.

He was found guilty and sentenced to be hanged. Seventeen merchants and bankers gave evidence as to his general integrity at the trial. After his conviction, powerful influence was brought to bear on his behalf, and his case was twice argued before judges on points of law. An Italian named Edmund Angelini even offered to take Fauntleroy's place on the scaffold. The efforts of his many friends were, however, unavailing, and he was hanged in November 1824, with the execution witnessed by Samuel Warren, who later recalled it in "My First Circuit", a section of his Miscellanies. The Times estimated that 100,000 persons gathered to watch Fauntleroy be hanged.

Fauntleroy was buried at Bunhill Fields Burial Ground in a family vault, though a wholly unfounded rumour was widely credited for some time subsequently, to the effect that he had escaped strangulation by inserting a silver tube in his throat and went to live comfortably abroad.

Fauntleroy's hanging made him one of the last few to be executed for forgery before that crime ceased to be a capital offence following enactment of two acts of Parliament: the Forgery, Abolition of Punishment of Death Act 1832 and the Forgery Act 1837. This outcome was in contrast to that of the fraudster Lancelot Cooper, who was compared to Fauntleroy by The Times in 1827. He was also condemned to death, but subsequently had his sentence commuted to transportation (probably due to the influence of John FitzGibbon, 2nd Earl of Clare).

Nathaniel Hawthorne's 1852 novel The Blithedale Romance includes a minor background character called Fauntleroy, a banker, while Henry Fauntleroy himself is a major character in Susan Grossey's 2013 novel Fatal Forgery.
