= New Prison =

Former prison in Clerkenwell, Central London

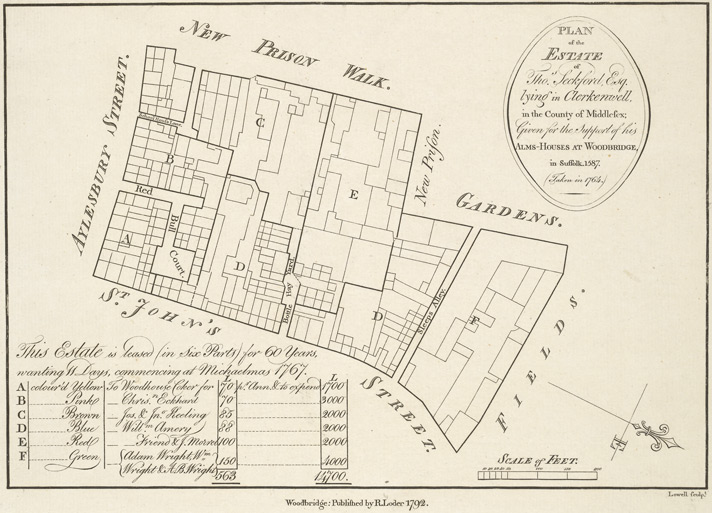
- 1764 plan of the estate of Thos Seckford, in Clerkenwell, showing the site of the New Prison
- Interactive map of New Prison
- Location: Clerkenwell, London; 51.5247°N 0.1061°W
- Status: Closed

Notable prisoners
- Jack Sheppard

The New Prison was a prison located in the Clerkenwell area of central London between c.1617 and 1877. The New Prison was used to house prisoners committed for examination before the police magistrates, for trial at the sessions, for want of bail, and occasionally on summary conviction.

It was rebuilt three times: in 1773, 1818 (after being burnt down in the Gordon Riots of 1780), and in 1847. At this time it was renamed the Clerkenwell House of Detention, also known as Clerkenwell Prison. It was the site of a notorious bomb outrage, the Clerkenwell explosion in 1867.

It should not be confused with the New Gaol, another name sometimes applied to Horsemonger Lane Gaol in Southwark, south London.

Next-door was another prison, the Clerkenwell Bridewell for convicted criminals, built c. 1615. This closed in 1794, being superseded by nearby Coldbath Fields Prison.

== Modern use of building remnants ==
During the Second World War part of the basement was altered to form a bomb shelter.

Today, the site of the New Prison and the Clerkenwell Bridewell is occupied by the former Hugh Myddleton School (1893-c.1960), in Bowling Green Lane. A number of the original underground spaces and cells remain and are used for office space or storage. A 2007 adaptation of Oliver Twist used these spaces for filming in July 2007.

In 2009, the site was redeveloped by developer Sans Walk, and the vaults of the building (formerly used for the reception of prisoners, medical examination and baths as well as kitchens) were accessed by members of the IStructE History Study Group.

== Notable inmates ==
- Jack Sheppard
