= Clerkenwell Bridewell =

Former prison in Clerkenwell, London

Coordinates: 51.5248°N 0.1077°W

- Interactive map of Clerkenwell Bridewell
- Location: Clerkenwell
- Status: Closed
- Opened: 1615
- Closed: 1794

Notable prisoners
- John Robins (prophet)

Clerkenwell Bridewell (also known as 'Clerkenwell House of Correction') was a prison and correctional institute for prostitutes and vagrants located in the Clerkenwell area, immediately north of the City of London (in the modern London Borough of Islington), between c. 1615 and 1794. It was named 'Bridewell' after the Bridewell Palace, which during the 16th century had become one of the City of London's most important prisons.

In 1615 the Middlesex Commission of the Peace bought land in Clerkenwell to the north of Clerkenwell Green to build a new county prison. The house of correction known as the New Prison or Clerkenwell Bridewell was built on part of the site to take overspill from the City of London prisons. In 1663–4 a workhouse was built on the north side of the prison as a workhouse for a union or 'corporation' of Middlesex parishes, but this was defunct by 1675. After the Bridewell burnt down in 1679, the prison was moved into part of the workhouse. The rest of the workhouse had become the Quaker Workhouse by 1700. By the 1790s the workhouse had closed and the dilapidated Bridewell had been superseded by the new Coldbath Fields Prison in Mount Pleasant (also known as 'House of Correction at Cold Bath Fields').

Next door was another prison, the New Prison (1617–1877). The Clerkenwell House of Detention, also known simply as Clerkenwell Prison, was built on the site of the two former prisons. Today, the site is occupied by the former Hugh Myddleton School (1893 – c. 1960), in Bowling Green Lane, which has now been converted into flats. The Victorian vaults of the House of Detention can still be accessed from Clerkenwell Close.

== Notable inmates ==
- John Robins (prophet) (fl. 1650–1652), released after signing a recantation against his former blasphemy.
