= Montagu Williams =

English lawyer (1835–1892)

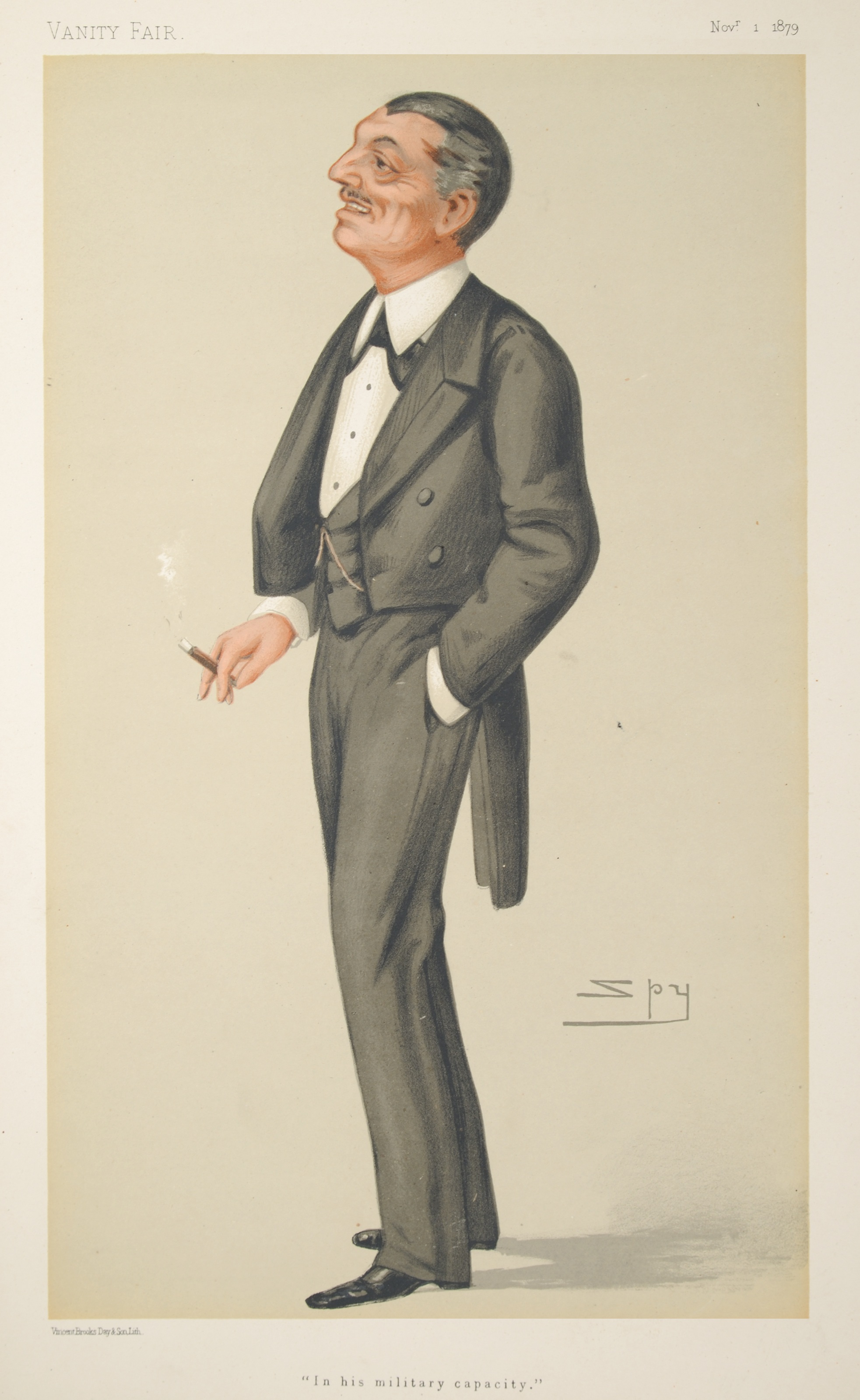
Vanity Fair caricature of Williams by Spy

Montagu Stephen Williams Q.C. (30 September 1835 – 23 December 1892) was an English teacher, British Army officer, actor, playwright, barrister and magistrate.

Williams was educated at Eton College and started his career as a schoolmaster at Ipswich School. On the outbreak of the Crimean War he joined the Royal South Lincoln Militia, then the 96th Regiment of Foot and finally the 41st (Welch) Regiment of Foot, but was too late and never got to fight at Sevastopol. Instead, he spent most of his service in Dublin. In the early 1860s he wrote several farces in partnership with F. C. Burnand, He later went onto the stage and was called to the bar in 1862. In 1879 he was appointed junior Treasury counsel, retiring from the post in 1886 due to a growth on the larynx which seriously affected his voice, being succeeded by Sir Charles Willie Mathews, 1st Baronet. Williams took up a post as metropolitan stipendiary magistrate in 1886 and was appointed Queen's Counsel in 1888.

His clients included Catherine Wilson, whom he defended twice on murder charges; George Henry Lamson, hanged in 1882 for poisoning his brother-in-law; Percy Lefroy Mapleton, the "railway murderer", hanged in 1881; John Young, acquitted of manslaughter after his opponent in a boxing match died, establishing a legal precedent.

He married Louise Keeley, daughter of Robert Keeley in 1858: she died in 1877. He died at Ramsgate in 1892 of uraemia.

== Publications ==
- Leaves of a life, 2 vols, 1890
- Later leaves (Macmillan, London) 1891
- Round London: Down East and Up West (Macmillan, London) 1892
