= HM Prison Maidstone =

Category C men's prison in Kent, England

Coordinates: 51°16′45″N 0°31′26″E

HMP Maidstone
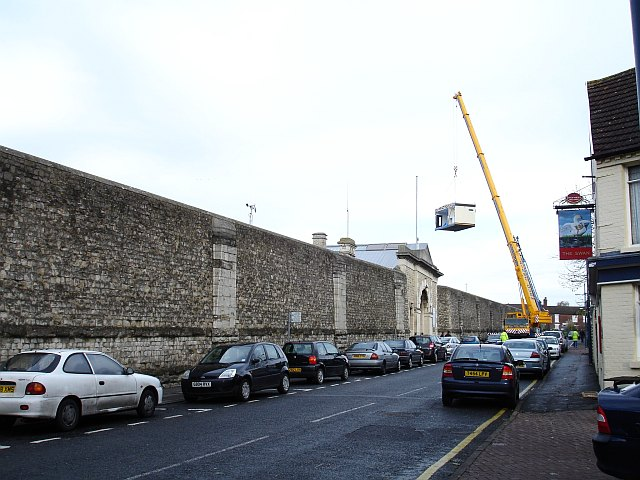
- Interactive map of HMP Maidstone
- Location: Maidstone, Kent
- Security class: Adult Male/Category C
- Population: 600 (May 2009)
- Opened: 1819
- Managed by: HM Prison Services
- Governor: Graham Spencer
- Website: http://www.justice.gov.uk/contacts/prison-finder/maidstone

HM Prison Maidstone is a Category C men's prison, located in Maidstone, Kent, England and operated by His Majesty's Prison Service.

== History ==
Maidstone Prison is one of the oldest penal institutions in the United Kingdom, having been in operation for over 200 years.

Originally serving as a county jail, Maidstone was converted to a prison during the 1740s. During his visits, reformer John Howard reported poor living conditions including overcrowding and poor ventilation. However, conditions would remain unchanged until a reconstruction of the prison lasting from 1811 until its completion in 1819 at a cost of £200,000, under the supervision of Daniel Asher Alexander, who had worked on the construction of Dartmoor Prison, . Also involved in the design of Maidstone Prison was Kent architect John Whichcord Snr, who was Surveyor to the County of Kent from the 1820s. Whichcord is probably best known for designing the Kent County Lunatic Asylum in the 1830s, also in Maidstone, and similarities between the two buildings are apparent.

Constructed using Kentish Ragstone from a local quarry, the original design of the prison was intended to house 552 prisoners, including 62 female inmates. The first 141 prisoners arrived in March 1819.

Over the next decade, additions to the prison were made including a courthouse in 1826 as well as individual cells, dayrooms, courtyards and offices attributed to suggestions made by Howard. Other reforms later included a strictly enforced segregation of prisoners by offence and the general improvement of living conditions such as improving the water supply, sanitation and ventilation system; many of these renovations were made with prison labour over the course of the century.

By the late 20th century, the only remaining signs of the original prison are the large and small roundhouses, the Weald Wing, the Administrative Block, the Training Complex, the Visits Building and the perimeter wall.

In August 2007, Weald Wing was closed when Legionella bacteria was discovered in the water supply. Approximately 80 prisoners were dispersed to other prisons. At the end of January 2009, it was announced that the prison would become a sex offenders' unit.

=== Capital punishment ===
Beginning in 1831, the prison became the place of execution for those condemned to death in the county of Kent. Before 1868, executions were done in public outside the prison's main gate. After the passing of the Capital Punishment Amendment Act 1868, subsequent executions took place inside the prison; the last was in 1930.

== Present-day ==
Maidstone accommodates foreign national prisoners convicted of a range of offences; about two-thirds of whom are deported at the end of their sentence. The prison is classed as a "training prison" and includes a print shop and brick works. A good deal of work is carried out on the gardens which frequently win awards and an environmental garden area is being developed.

== Notable inmates ==
- Norman Baillie-Stewart, British army officer who was released from Maidstone in 1937 after serving five-year sentence for espionage.
- Horatio Bottomley, financier, Member of Parliament and newspaper editor. In 1922, he was sentenced to seven years imprisonment for fraud.
- Hermann Görtz, German national convicted of espionage in 1936; he was released and deported back to Germany in 1939.
- Jonathan King, record producer and TV presenter, was imprisoned in Maidstone from 2001 to 2005 for four indecent assaults and two serious sexual offences.
- Reggie Kray, notorious gangster married Roberta Jones in Maidstone prison on 14 July 1997
- George Joseph Smith, serial killer, was hanged at Maidstone Prison in 1915.
- Éamon de Valera, Irish statesman, Taoiseach and President of Ireland, was briefly held at Maidstone Prison in 1917.
- John Vassall, British civil servant convicted of spying for the Soviet Union in 1962.

== Media appearances ==
The exterior of Maidstone Prison was shown in the title sequence (and some episodes) of the 1970s BBC comedy series Porridge and the 1990s BBC comedy series Birds of a Feather.
