= Paul Lorrain =

Paul Lorrain (died 7 October 1719) was, for twenty-two years, the secretary, translator, and copyist for Samuel Pepys, and became well known as the Ordinary (chaplain) of Newgate Prison by standardising the publication of the gallows confessions of condemned prisoners.

== Biography ==
Lorrain was, by Pepys' account, of Huguenot extraction. He was educated at neither of the English universities, but describes himself as presbyter of the Church of England. He was taken on by Pepys as a secretary from 1678 and developed a close relationship lasting until Pepys's death in 1703. His responsibilities included transcription of records and cataloguing of Pepys's library; during his employment, he also published a number of Protestant polemical and devotional tracts. In the 1690s, Lorrain's Protestant theological leanings, perhaps together with concern for his future arising out of Pepys advancing years, led him to the Church of England.

He succeeded Samuel Smith, who died on 24 August 1698, as Ordinary of Newgate Prison, being appointed in September 1698. (Note: Marcus Walsh in notes to Jonathan Swift's A Tale of a Tub and Other Works gives a different date: 7 November 1700.) From his appointment until 1719 he compiled the official accounts of the dying speeches of criminals condemned to capital punishment and oversaw their printing in broadsheets; 48 of these broadsheets are in the British Museum. The confessions, to which are prefixed abstracts of Lorrain's 'funeral sermons,' are generally headed ''The Ordinary of Newgate, his Account of the Behaviour, Confession, and last Speech of X.,' &c. They were issued at eight o'clock on the morning following the execution, and signed Paul Lorrain, the public being warned against counterfeits and unauthorised accounts. Lorrain standardised the layout of the Confessions, and zealously promoted the sale of his versions over competing unofficial broadsheets. He also benefited greatly from the publications, receiving some £200 per annum income from them, as compared with his remuneration as Ordinary, which with privileges amounted to some £65 per annum.

Among the most notorious felons whom Lorrain attended to the scaffold were Captain Kidd (May 1701), Captain T. Smith, James Sheppard (March 1718), Deborah Churchill (a "common strumpet" executed on 17 December 1708), and Jack Hall (1707). On some occasions, when 15 or even 20 condemned persons were executed at once, the confessions are proportionately abridged.

In a joint letter from Alexander Pope and Bolingbroke to Swift, dated December 1725, the 'late ordinary' is described ironically as the 'great historiographer.' The penitence of his clients is always described as so heartfelt that the latter are playfully called by Richard Steele 'Lorrain's Saints'. A number of questions were raised by Daniel Defoe as to the extent to which his polemical and commercial interests affected the authenticity of his Confessions. Graham Harris, in his account of the execution of Captain Kidd, describes Lorrain as "a rather sanctimonious prig", quotes Bryant's view of Lorrain as "addicted to piety" and describes the Accounts as equivalent to the "gutter press".

Lorrain died at his house in Town Ditch, London, on 7 October 1719. He is said to have left £5,000. His post, which was in the gift of the Lord Mayor and the Court of Aldermen, was keenly contested until 20 November when 'Mr. Purney, a young sucking divine of twenty-four years of age,' was elected 'at the recommendation of the very Orthodox Bishop of P——'.

== Works ==
Besides several sermons, including one on Popery near akin to Paganism and Atheism, dedicated to Harley (1712), and a translation of Pierre Muret's Rites of Funeral (1683), Lorrain brought out in 1702 a little book, entitled The Dying Man's Assistant, dedicated to Sir Thomas Abney, Lord Mayor, in addition to which he published and advertised on the vacant spaces of his Confessions various small manuals of medicine, devotion, corn-cutting, &c. – probably his own compilations. Other works include:

- Marcus Minucius Felix Octavus, or, A Vindication of Christianity Against Paganism (1682)
- A Preparation of the Lord's Supper, to which are Added, Maxims of True Christianity (1688)
- A discourse of Christianity: laying open the abuses thereof in the Anti-Christian lives and worship of many of its professors; especially the Romanists; and shewing the way to a holy life in the character of a true Christian (1693)
- A way to salvation, or, The way to eternal bliss; being a collection of meditations and prayers suited to the exercise of a true Christian (1693)

== See also ==
- Ordinary of Newgate's Account

== Notes and references ==
- This article incorporates text from a publication now in the public domain: "Lorrain, Paul". Dictionary of National Biography. London: Smith, Elder & Co. 1885–1900.
