= Samuel Smith (prison chaplain) =

Samuel Smith (1620–1698) was a priest of the Church of England. He was educated at the Merchant Taylors' School and St John's College, Oxford. He then became rector of St Benet Gracechurch in 1656 but lost that position as a result of the Act of Uniformity 1662. He was subsequently most famous for being the Ordinary of Newgate from 1676. The Ordinary of Newgate was the prison chaplain who ministered to the prisoners. He heard their confessions before they were executed and Smith produced accounts of these which were published by George Croom as popular pamphlets.
