= Gold dust robbery =

The gold dust robbery took place 25 March 1839 in London at the Dublin Steam Packet Company. According to the New Newgate Calendar, pp. 480ff, "The extraordinary robbery to which these persons were parties involved circumstances probably more singular than any other which ever came before a court of justice".

== Events ==
Lewin Caspar (1815–1842), a clerk at the Dublin Steam Packet Company at 16 John Street Crutchfriars (now Crosswall street), found out that 102 lbs of gold dust worth £4,600 had landed at Falmouth, Cornwall from Brazil on the HM Seagull Packet and was then being sent on to London. Together with his London-born father, Ellis (Elias Levy) Caspar (1784–1862) carefully planned a robbery. Its failure resulted in the transportation of the Caspars and their associates.

The plot led to the arrests of four individuals. A clerk Lewin and his father Ellis Caspar, Moss, who had the role of messenger, Solomon, a gold-refiner, and "Money Moses", involved in the planning of the robbery.

Ellis and Lewin Caspar were sentenced at the Old Bailey in London on 17 June 1839 for 15 years for "feloniously receiving stolen goods". They spent time in the infamous Newgate Prison in London and were then transported to Van Diemen's Land on the convict ship Lord Lyndoch from Plymouth, arriving in 1841. The vessel left Plymouth for Australia on 11 September 1840 and arrived in Hobart Town on 5 February 1841, with 314 prisoners, after a voyage of 147 days.

== News reports ==
The following extract is taken from The chronicles of Newgate by Arthur Griffiths, published in 1884 in London by Chapman and Hall (pp. 473–74)

"The gold-dust robbery of 1839, the first of its kind, was cleverly and carefully planned with the assistance of a dishonest employee. A young man named Caspar [Lewin Casper], clerk to a steam-ship company, learnt through the firm's correspondence that a quantity of gold-dust brought in a man-of-war from Brazil had been transhipped at Falmouth for conveyance to London. The letter informed him of the marks and sizes of the cases containing the precious metal, and he with his father [Ellis Casper] arranged that a messenger should call for the stuff with forged credentials, and anticipating the rightful owner. The fraudulent messenger, by the help of young Caspar, established his claim to the boxes, paid the wharfage dues, and carried off the gold-dust. Presently the proper person arrived from the consignees, but found the gold-dust gone.

The police were at once employed, and after infinite pains they discovered the person, one Moss, who had acted as the messenger. Moss was known to be intimate with the elder Caspar, father of the clerk to the steam-ship company, and these facts were deemed sufficient to justify the arrest of all three. They also ascertained that a gold-refiner, Solomons, had sold bar gold to the value of 1200 pounds sterling to certain bullion dealers. Solomons was not straightforward in his replies as to where he got the gold, and he was soon placed in the dock with the Caspars and Moss. Moss presently turned approver, and implicated "Money Moses", another Jew, for the whole affair had been planned and executed by members of the Hebrew persuasion. "Money Moses" had received the stolen gold-dust from Moss' father-in-law, Davis, or Isaacs, who was never arrested, and passed it on to Solomons by his daughter, a widow named Abrahams. Solomons was now also admitted as a witness, and his evidence, with that of Moss, secured the transportation of the principal actors in the theft.

A detailed account by a former detective written anonymously and featured in a 1890 edition of the Weekly Times was later published, providing information regarding the investigative process leading to arrests and trial.

"The trial of the gang lasted eight days, and created great excitement at the time. Solomons had been previously tried and sentenced for receiving, and he, with Moss, gave evidence against the others. Lewin Caspar was found guilty by the jury as an accessory before the fact; Ellis Caspar,. His father, as an accessory before and after the fact; and Emanuel Moses guilty. Alice Abrahams was also found guilty, but recommended, to mercy on the plea that she was acting under the advice and influence of her father."

== In Australia ==
On arrival in Tasmania Lewin Caspar served a year probation at the Hobart Town Prisoner's Barracks and at Bridgewater during which time his conduct was described as "very good." Convict records say he had a "fair complexion, dark brown hair and red whiskers, a long face, hazel eyes and a large nose." He died of scarlet fever in the hospital in the prisoner's barracks in Hobart on 13 June 1842.

His father, Ellis, was described as having a "fair complexion, black to grey hair, light hazel hair, strong featured." He served a period of probation on a prison hulk in the River Derwent and then in the Hobart prisoner's barracks. He was moved to Sandy Bay in August 1842 where he spent six days in solitary confinement for insolence and neglect of duty. He was denied permission to attend the funeral of his son Lewin and an appeal to Governor Franklin to overturn the ban was unsuccessful. While in prison he was appointed a javalin man (overseer). By 1845 he had been joined by his wife and three children and the family held seat No.37 in the Hobart Synagogue. He received his ticket of leave on 2 June 1846 and was recommended for a pardon on 14 December 1847, which was granted on 30 January 1849. He was described as a, "Watch and clock maker, jeweller and silversmith, late of Finsbury Square London and now at Murray St, Hobart Town," and that he would soon be moving "to more commodious premises," in Liverpool St, by the end of 1847. One of his clocks, the face inscribed, "E. Caspar, Hobart Town," is still keeping good time in the Supreme Court of Tasmania. He and his wife, Elizabeth, left Tasmania and moved to Victoria in 1856. He was 77 years of age when he died at his home at 208 King Street, Melbourne, in 1862. He is buried in Carlton in the Melbourne General Cemetery.
