= Ordinary (church officer) =

Ecclesiastical title for local authorities

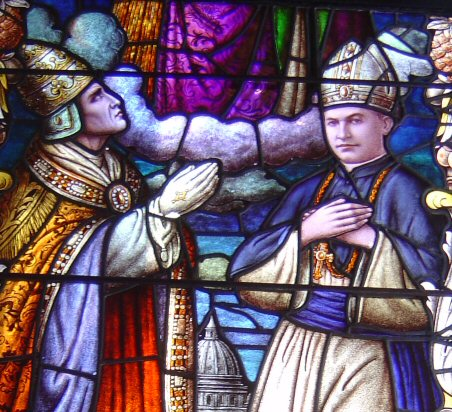
Pope Pius XI (left), depicted in this window at the Cathedral of Our Lady of Peace, Honolulu, was ordinary of the universal Church as well as of the Diocese of Rome from 1922 to 1939. Bishop Stephen Alencastre (right), Apostolic Vicar of the Sandwich Islands, was the ordinary of what is now the Diocese of Honolulu.

An ordinary (from Latin ordinarius, meaning "overseer") is an officer of a church or civic authority who by reason of office has ordinary power to execute laws.

Such officers feature in hierarchically organised churches of Western Christianity which have an ecclesiastical legal-system. For example, diocesan bishops are ordinaries in the Catholic Church and in the Church of England. In Eastern Christianity, a corresponding officer is called a hierarch (from Greek ἱεράρχης hierarkhēs "president of sacred rites, high-priest" which comes in turn from τὰ ἱερά ta hiera, "the sacred rites" and ἄρχω arkhō, "I rule").

During at least the 17th and 18th centuries in England the title of "Ordinary" could designate a prison chaplain, such as the one who attended condemned prisoners before their execution at Newgate.

== Ordinary power ==
In canon law, the power to govern the church is divided into the power to make laws (legislative), enforce the laws (executive), and to judge based on the law (judicial). An official exercises power to govern either because he holds an office to which the law grants governing power or because someone with governing power has delegated it to him. Ordinary power is the former, while the latter is delegated power. The office with ordinary power could possess the governing power itself (proper ordinary power) or instead it could have the ordinary power of agency, the inherent power to exercise someone else's power (vicarious ordinary power).

The law vesting ordinary power could either be ecclesiastical law, i.e. the positive enactments that the church has established for itself, or divine law, i.e. the laws which were given to the Church by God. As an example of divinely instituted ordinaries, when Jesus established the Church, he also established the episcopate and the primacy of Peter, endowing the offices with power to govern the Church. Thus, in the Catholic Church, the office of successor of Simon Peter and the office of diocesan bishop possess their ordinary power even in the absence of positive enactments from the Church.

Many officers possess ordinary power but, due to their lack of ordinary executive power, are not called ordinaries. The best example of this phenomenon is the office of judicial vicar, a.k.a. officialis. The judicial vicar only has authority through his office to exercise the diocesan bishop's power to judge cases. Though the vicar has vicarious ordinary judicial power, he is not an ordinary because he lacks ordinary executive power. A vicar general, however, has authority through his office to exercise the diocesan bishop's executive power. He is therefore an ordinary because of this vicarious ordinary executive power.

== Roman Catholic Church ==
=== Local ordinaries and hierarchs ===
Local ordinaries exercise ordinary power and are ordinaries in particular churches. The following clerics are local ordinaries:

- The Bishop of Rome (the pope) is ordinary for the whole Catholic Church.
- In Eastern Catholic churches, patriarchs, major archbishops, and metropolitans have ordinary power of governance for the whole territory of their respective autonomous particular churches.
- Diocesan/eparchial bishops/eparchs
- Other prelates who head, even if only temporarily, a particular church or a community equivalent to it. Canon 368 of the Code of Canon Law lists five Latin jurisdictional areas that are considered equivalent to a diocese. These are headed by:
  - A territorial prelate, formerly called a prelate nullius dioceseos (of no diocese), in charge of a geographical area that has not yet been raised to the level of diocese
  - A territorial abbot, in charge of an area associated with an abbey
  - An apostolic vicar (normally a bishop of a titular see), in charge of an apostolic vicariate, usually in a mission country, not yet ready to be made a diocese
  - An apostolic prefect (usually not a bishop), in charge of an apostolic prefecture, not yet ready to be made an apostolic vicariate
  - A permanent apostolic administrator, in charge of a geographical area that for serious reasons cannot be made a diocese.
- To these may be added:
  - An exarch (usually a bishop of a titular see), in charge of an exarchate—not yet ready to be made an eparchy—for the faithful of an Eastern Catholic Church
  - A military ordinariate
  - A personal prelate, in charge of a group of persons without regard to geography: the only personal prelature existing is that of Opus Dei
  - An ordinary of a personal ordinariate for former Anglicans
  - A superior of an autonomous mission
- Of somewhat similar standing is the diocesan administrator (formerly called a vicar capitular) elected to govern a diocese during a vacancy. Apart from certain limitations of nature and law, he has, on a caretaker basis, the same obligations and powers as a diocesan bishop. Occasionally an apostolic administrator is appointed by the Holy See to run a vacant diocese, or even a diocese whose bishop is incapacitated or otherwise impeded.

Where local ordinaries or hierarchs of different rites within the Catholic Church have jurisdiction in the same area, they are expected to operate together and share "common counsel".

Also classified as local ordinaries, although they do not head a particular church or equivalent community are:

- Vicars general and protosyncelli
- Episcopal vicars and syncelli

=== Ordinaries who are not local ordinaries ===
Major superiors of religious institutes (including abbots) and of societies of apostolic life are ordinaries of their respective memberships, but not local ordinaries.

== Eastern Orthodox Church ==
In the Eastern Orthodox Church, a hierarch (ruling bishop) holds uncontested authority within the boundaries of his own diocese; no other bishop may perform any sacerdotal functions without the ruling bishop's express invitation. The violation of this rule is called eispēdēsis (Greek: εἰσπήδησις, "trespassing", literally "jumping in"), and is uncanonical. Ultimately, all bishops in the Church are equal, regardless of any title they may enjoy (Patriarch, Metropolitan, Archbishop, etc.). The role of the bishop in the Orthodox Church is both hierarchical and sacramental.

This pattern of governance dates back to the earliest centuries of Christianity, as witnessed by the writings of Ignatius of Antioch (c. 100 AD):

The bishop in each Church presides in the place of God.... Let no one do any of the things which concern the Church without the bishop.... Wherever the bishop appears, there let the people be, just as wherever Jesus Christ is, there is the Catholic Church.

And it is the bishop's primary and distinctive task to celebrate the Eucharist, "the medicine of immortality." Saint Cyprian of Carthage (258 AD) wrote:

The episcopate is a single whole, in which each bishop enjoys full possession. So is the Church a single whole, though it spreads far and wide into a multitude of churches and its fertility increases.

Bishop Kallistos (Ware) wrote:

There are many churches, but only One Church; many episcopi but only one episcopate."

In Eastern Orthodox Christianity, the church is not seen as a monolithic, centralized institution, but rather as existing in its fullness in each local body. The church is defined Eucharistically:

in each particular community gathered around its bishop; and at every local celebration of the Eucharist it is the whole Christ who is present, not just a part of Him. Therefore, each local community, as it celebrates the Eucharist ... is the church in its fullness."

An Eastern Orthodox bishop's authority comes from his election and consecration. He is, however, subject to the Sacred Canons of the Eastern Orthodox Church, and answers to the Synod of Bishops to which he belongs. In case an Orthodox bishop is overruled by his local synod, he retains the right of appeal (Greek: Ἔκκλητον, Ékklēton) to his ecclesiastical superior (e.g. a Patriarch) and his synod.

== See also ==
- Military ordinariate
