= Jack Hall (thief) =

Traditional song about an English criminal

Jack Hall (around 1673/7 – 17 December 1707) was an English thief. He is the subject of a traditional British folksong "Jack Hall" (now better known as "Sam Hall", Roud 369).

== Life ==
Born John Hall to Rebecca and Anthony Hall, a cobbler, in Bishop's Head Court, near Gray's Inn Lane, Holborn, London. His date of birth is uncertain: before he was executed on 17 December 1707 he gave his age as 32, which would indicate that he was born in late 1673, or in 1674, but parish records show he was baptised at St Andrew Holborn on 18 January 1677.

He became a chimney sweep (in some accounts he was sold when young to a chimney sweep for a guinea). In later life he became a notorious thief. In 1707 he was arrested along with Stephen Bunce and Dick Low for a burglary committed at the house of Captain Guyon, near Stepney. All three were convicted and hanged at Tyburn on 17 December 1707.

== Song ==
A broadsheet of his Gallows Confessional was put to the melody of "Captain Kidd", previously executed for piracy in 1701. Jack Hall's song was made popular in the 1850s with the adaptation "Sam Hall" by English comic minstrel, W. G. Ross.
