= Ordinary of Newgate's Account =

The Ordinary of Newgate's Account was a sister publication of the Old Bailey's Proceedings, regularly published from 1676 to 1772 and containing biographies and last dying speeches of the prisoners executed at Tyburn during that period. The Accounts were written by the chaplain (or "Ordinary") of Newgate Prison, recounting the statements made by the condemned during confession. Over 400 editions were published, containing biographies of some 2,500 executed criminals.

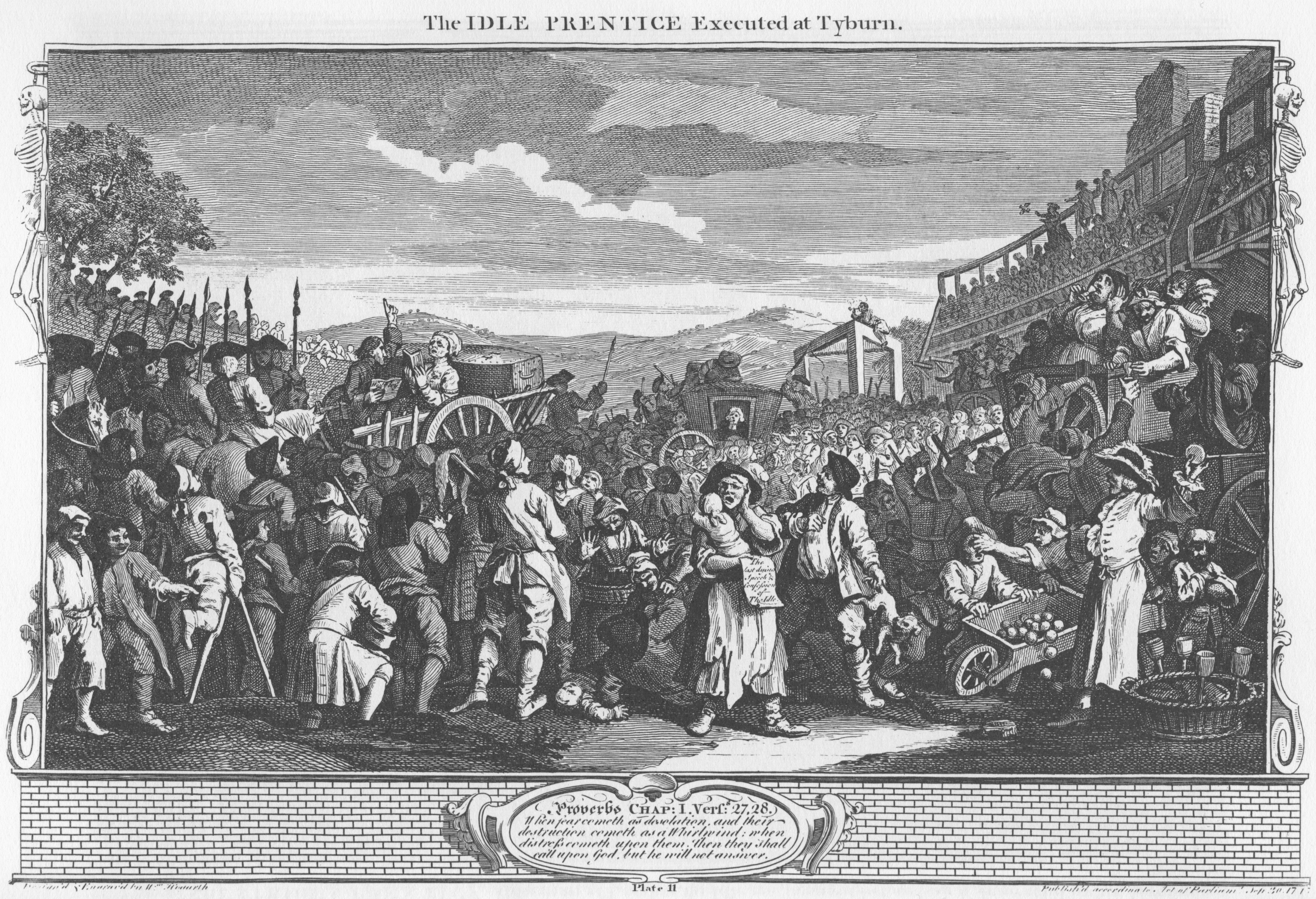
William Hogarth – Industry and Idleness, Plate 11; The Idle 'Prentice Executed at Tyburn

Although target of many objections and criticism during the 18th century, since much of their contents can be verified from external sources, if carefully used the Accounts provide an important source of knowledge on many aspects of 18th century English history.

All surviving accounts relating to convicts tried at sessions of the Old Bailey court and published under the name of the Ordinary of Newgate can be consulted on the Old Bailey Proceedings Online website.

== Form of the Accounts ==
The external form of the Accounts underwent several changes during the century, in its size, format and layout. In only twenty years, from something close to a broadside they became a small pamphlet, indicating both consolidation as a specific genre and the permission given by the City Officials. They were published at the price of 2 or 3 pence as folio broadsheets until 1712, when they were expanded to six folio pages. During the 1720s the type size was reduced and a third column was added. By 1734 they comprised sixteen or twenty-eight quarto pages and they were sold for 4 or 6 pence.

On the other hand, the internal form of the Accounts remained almost unchanged through the century. They were divided into five sections: the first contained the basic facts of the trial, its date, the magistrates present at the trial, the members of the two juries and a summary of the proceedings; the second offered the synopsis of the sermon given by the Ordinary and cited the biblical texts from which he preached to the condemned; the third can be divided in two, its first part a description of the life of the condemned with vital information, and its second part a summary of his conversations with the Ordinary regarding his crimes; the fourth was composed of various items, sometimes narratives supposedly written by the condemned themselves, a brief essay on some topic like smuggling that the Ordinary or his printer thought appropriate, or copies of letters sent to the condemned; the fifth was a recount of the events of the hanging itself, the psalms sung and the condition of the condemned or his potential attempts to escape. In the early 18th century they included advertisements, which appeared less often in the 1720s.

== Main purposes ==
=== Judicial value ===
Since at the time the administration of justice depended on private prosecutions, the Accounts could lead to valuable judicial discoveries, for instance the names of potential accomplices. Information obtained from confessions was given to the authorities by the Ordinary, who sometimes took an active role in arranging the return of stolen goods to robbery victims.

The Accounts also had the power to legitimise the Court's decision, seeking positive statements of guilt to a particular crime, and to justify the hanging with life stories filled with a general range of immoral conduct.

=== Moral value ===
The Accounts, even more than other criminal biographies, had the purpose of teaching readers about the wages of sin and often follow a similar pattern that can be called a 'Sinner to saint' type of biography. They took the form of inverted parabolas, recounting the protagonist's descent from immorality to criminality, from minor delinquencies and skipping church to a life of crime. The condemned, brought in front of the Ordinary, confesses in detail his wrongdoings, repents and welcomes death hoping for salvation after having set an example for the audience. Accepting the judgment of the jury, coming to terms with their guilt and confessing their crimes led the criminals to a sort of reintegration into society, working as a repayment of their debts to the community and a preparation for salvation.

The confession was for contemporaries indispensable as proof of sincerity of one’s repentance and as a rigorous self-examination which was the necessary precondition of spiritual regeneration. Most believed that whoever died without acknowledging his crimes was damned.

The gallows scene was a moment of public reconciliation and mutual forgiveness as well: the condemned participated actively in his execution, healing the fractures in the spiritual and social order caused by his sins and crime. Those who weren't able to attend the hanging could still participate thanks to the Ordinary's Account.

=== Spiritual importance and the 'Everyman' criminal ===
In the late 17th and 18th century, the last dying words and behaviour of the condemned had a profound metaphysical and political significance.

The general idea and principle of the confessional genre was that dying men did not lie. The Accounts presented the most compelling truth claims, speaking to the spiritual state and eternal prospects not only of the condemned but of the reader too, asking the audience to place themselves in the shoes of the criminal.

The condemned was presented in the light of a universal and generic sinner, the 'Everyman': the public sinner, the criminal, was different from the private sinner, the reader, only in degree not in kind. The Accounts presented themselves as a mirror, a looking glass for young Gentlemen and Gentlewomen, a seamark to all the readers so that they could avoid the fatal rocks of Sin, because even the best of men could find himself deep amidst death-threatening dangers.

The dangers and temptations of sin were faced by all men, including readers, and suggested that salvation was available to all.

=== Value for the Ordinary ===
The Accounts were frequently used by the Ordinaries to refute personal slights and display their diligence and efforts. They stressed their manly fortitude and the firm manner in which they confronted the most hardened malefactors, repeatedly reminding the reader of their constant visits to the condemned in spite of their poor health and of the epidemic typhus which was common in 18th century prisons. They tended to exaggerate the bad behaviour of the criminals to emphasise how much they improved under the Ordinaries' care.

Ordinaries were also anxious to be seen to discriminate between true repentance and a too superficial and transitory last-minute deathbed repentance; they often expressed doubts regarding the sincerity of the condemned repentance.

== The Ordinary and his office ==
The Ordinary of Newgate was the Newgate Prison chaplain. He was always a clergyman of the Established Church and was appointed by the Court of Aldermen of the City of London. The Court often issued orders to better define the Ordinary's duties, due to his neglect or absence.

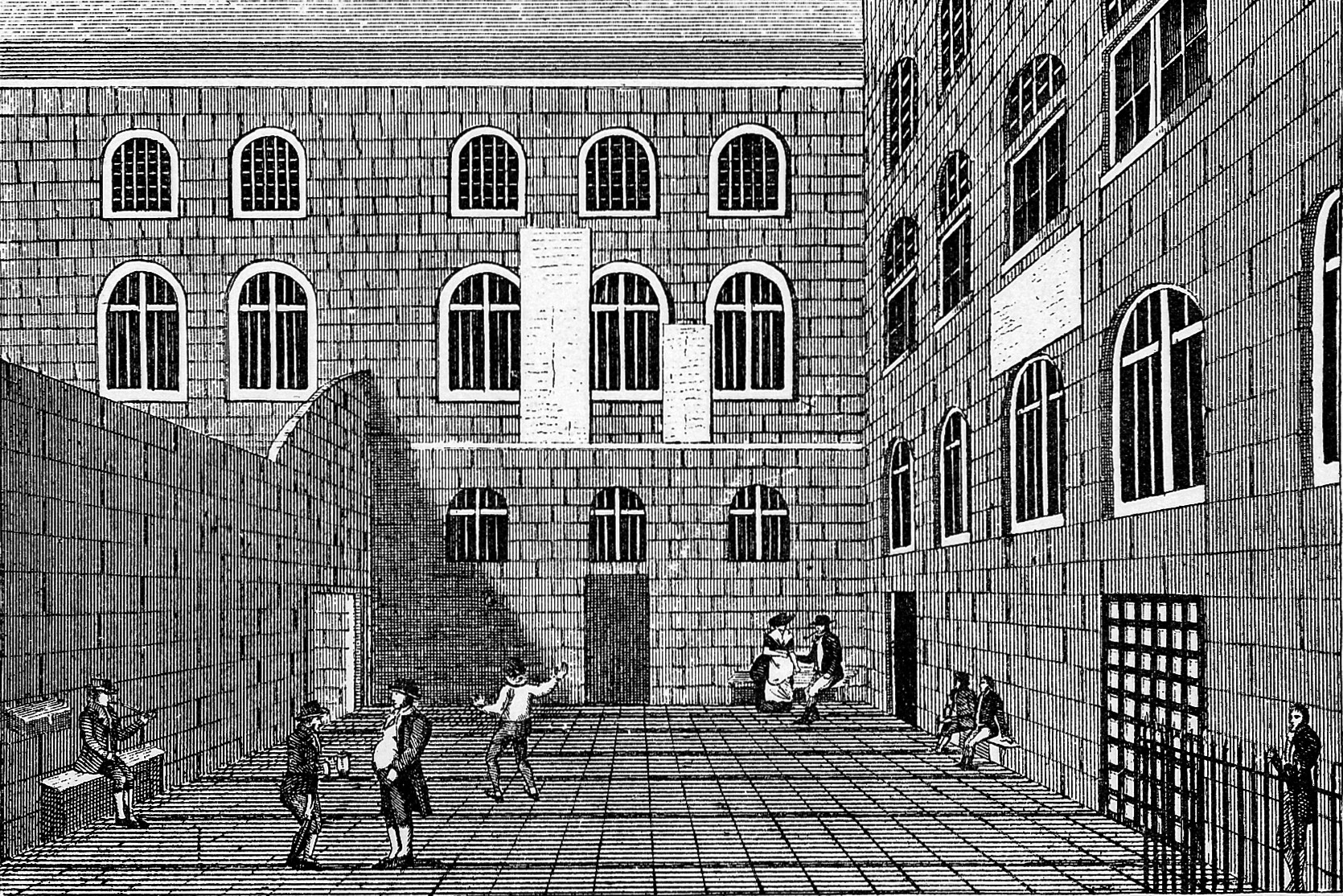
Newgate Prison, Inner Court, 18th century. Wellcome L0001330

The Ordinary read prayers, preached and instructed the prisoners, but his most important duty was to attend upon those condemned to die: he made special arrangements to give them the sacrament, delivered to them and those who paid for seats the condemned sermon in the prison chapel, rode with them to Tyburn, and led the condemned and the crowd in the singing of hymns on the hanging site.

The income from the office of the Ordinary was irregular in both forms and payment. He received a salary of £35 and two, three or four 'freedoms' to the city each year (which could be sold for about £25 each) from the City of London, earned from interests on various bequests and his house on Newgate Street was clear of the land tax. But he had other opportunities of profit beside his salary and usual gifts: several Ordinaries exploited their position to publish religious guides and individual recounts of lives of notorious malefactors. Evidence suggests that the income from the Accounts must have been substantial too: many criminals refused to confess their crimes on the grounds that the Ordinary would profit from them, and in one of the Ordinary's Accounts one Charles Brown alluded to how every number of the Accounts earned him £25, which the Ordinary did not deny.

Due to his office, the Ordinary could be placed between the judge, who sentenced to death, and the hangman, who carried out the sentence: his task was to justify the decisions of the former and to confer Christian sanction to the work of the latter. The Ordinary's office was also invested with spiritual importance by the contemporaries, importance testified by the frequency and vehemence of the attacks on the prison chaplain.

=== List of Ordinaries from 1676 to 1799 ===
Hereunder is a list of the Ordinaries who regularly published the Accounts during the 17th and 18th centuries.

- Samuel Smith, Ordinary from 15 June 1676 until 24 August 1698. He is the first Ordinary to publish regular accounts of confessions, behaviour and last speeches of the condemned in Newgate Prison. His son officiated between Smith's death and the appointment of his successor.
- John Allen, Ordinary from 10 October 1698 until 30 May 1699. He was dismissed for corruption, extortion and 'undue practises'.
- Roger Wykes, Ordinary from June 1700, officiated only for a few months until his death in October of the same year.
- Paul Lorrain, Ordinary from 7 November 1700 until his death on 10 October 1719. He converted the Accounts in a profitable publication through the addition of advertisements, which under him became a periodical and semi-official publication. He printed his sermons and biographies of famous malefactors as well, and translated comprendia and funeral rites. Ordinary during the incarceration of Daniel Defoe in 1703, he's probably the object of Defoe's "A Hymn to the Funeral Sermon". Thomas Browne acted as temporary replacement between his death and the appointment of his successor.
- Thomas Purney, Ordinary from 17 November 1719 until he ceased to act as Ordinary due to ill health in September 1725 and died on 14 November 1727. Born in Kent in 1695, he took the Holy Orders in 1718 and acquired the position in Newgate Prison through the intervention of the Bishop of Peterborough. Besides the Accounts he published volumes of pastoral poetry and was frequently object of satire, presumably because during his office many famous criminals were executed, such as Jack Sheppard and Jonathan Wild. During his leaves of absence for illness in the summer of 1724 and in the winter of 1724 and 1725, James Wagstaff officiated in his stead.
- James Guthrie was officially instated as Ordinary on 19 February 1733/1734 but officiated from 29 September 1725 to 1746 since Purney left the care of Newgate Prison to him while he was in the country. Formerly he held curacy of Coleman Street and had been a schoolteacher of Latin. In 1746 the Court found him rendered incapable by his age and other infirmities and he was dismissed with an annual pension of £40.
- Samuel Rossel, Ordinary from 17 June 1746 until he died on 12 March 1747. Formerly curate of St Giles, Cripplegate for twenty years. James Paterson officiated between his death and the appointment of the new Ordinary.
- John Taylor, Ordinary from 12 July 1747 until 28 June 1757. He presented his resignation pleading his great debts.
- Stephen Roe, Ordinary from 12 July 1757 until his death on 22 October 1764.
- Joseph Moore, Ordinary from 20 November 1764 until his death on 20 June 1769. There are few of his Accounts after 1765, maybe suggesting that it was briefly discontinued in this period.^{[3]}
- John Wood, Ordinary from 18 July 1769 until he took a leave of absence in May 1774 and officially resigned in January 1774 due to ill health. During his office the Accounts are published sporadically. Silas Told, Methodist minister, officiated in Wood's absence.
- John Villette, Ordinary from 8 February 1774 until 25 April 1799. He did not resume the regular publication the Accounts, but compiled the "Annals of Newgate" in 1776, a few pamphlets on the executions of famous malefactors and early in his office, between 1774 and 1775 provided accounts of confessions and speeches of the condemned to several newspapers.

== Objections and attacks ==
The Accounts and the Ordinary had an almost universal bad press. The critics came not only from the condemned but from official channels too.

Ordinaries were often accused on the newspapers by competing writers of criminal lives of fabricating the last dying speeches of the condemned and of manipulating their position to extract confessions from them. Paul Lorrain was accused of confessing the criminals for his economical profit and Purney was attacked for literary incompetence. Accusations of withholding the sacrament under the pretense of the criminals not being prepared but in reality with the goal to get an account of their lives and transactions were common. Even if some of the condemned were really compelled to confess sins which laid heavily on their conscience, most of them did so only to qualify for the sacrament, acknowledging a catalogue of general misdeeds and stopping short of admitting to more serious crimes, especially the one of which they were accused of for fear of jeopardising their chances of a reprieve.

Most of the contemporaries' critics to the Ordinary reprimanded him not for his office or for being insensitive or too rigorous and persistent in obtaining confessions, but for slackness and negligence and for being too lax. 19th and 20th century commentators characterised him as morally lax, drunken and dissolute, an incompetent minister, weak and ineffectual, unable to exert any control over the condemned. Victorian and Edwardian writers conflate the Ordinary and his Accounts with the corruption and depravity of 18th century Church. We have proof of the corruption of some Ordinaries as well: Samuel Smith and John Allen were discharged by the Court of Aldermen for undue practices, such as fabricating false confessions and dying speeches, pocketing charitable donations and money sent to the condemned, soliciting bribes under the pretext of obtaining reprieves for the criminals.

Modern scholars tend to view the Accounts as too sensational and scripted to constitute an accurate or reliable source, forgetting how they were the principal source of later publications generally assumed to be reliable, like the Newgate Calendar, and that they were a mainstream publication, beginning as a sister publication of the Proceedings.

== Decline of the Accounts ==
The reasons for the declining success of the Accounts were several and of different nature. The Ordinary's morality was often perceived as dubious, because of the profit that the Accounts provided him and because of suspected corruption (he was often accused of bribing the condemned to have their confessions). Another cause would be the competition represented by not only other authors of accounts but by ministers of other denominations too, who could assist the condemned in prison. The notion of 'Everyman' criminal was declining, as well as the notion of the gallows as a sacred place in which the words and actions of the condemned were invested with metaphysical and political consequence.

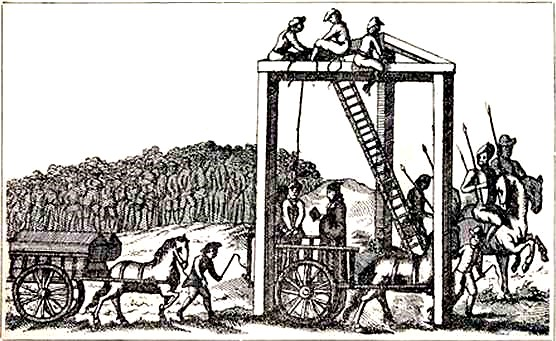
Tyburn tree

=== Decline of popular demand ===
In the 1760s there was a decline of popular demand for the confessional genre that could be connected to the crisis of the notion of 'Everyman' criminal.

By the middle of the 18th century, there was a growing tendency to make explicit distinction between the condemned and the reader. The condemned was increasingly relegated to his social sphere; he was not seen as a sinner, someone to whom the audience could relate to, but as someone who came from an intellectually and morally inferior class. By the 1760s it was common for the Ordinary to put emphasis on grammatical and orthographic errors of the condemned and to apologise for having as subjects such mean individuals. The Ordinary frequently made claims that the condemned were creatures deserving of pity, suggesting that common criminals lacked the moral and intellectual faculties of the readers and so emphasising the distance between the reader and the condemned.

The notion of the criminal as 'Everyman', morally no different from the audience, was then totally abandoned; the reader could comfort himself with the knowledge that he at least, unlike the criminal, was saved.

=== Reconfiguration of morality and Methodism ===
From the 17th century, the idea of rational religion and of the man as rational creature created by a reasonable benevolent and distant creature gradually came to replace the older pessimistic conception of mankind as frail and degenerate and the divinity as a vengeful and interventionist judge. Morality was increasingly internalised in the conscience of the rational individual, which was seen as the natural magistrate in every man's heart.

The older Calvinistic emphasis on free grace was given new life in Methodist publications, preaching God's wonderful method of saving even the worst of sinners. It was viewed with suspicion and distrust by mid and late 18th century Anglican priests, since it carried with it the belief that salvation could be obtained without adherence to the moral law as delivered in the Ten Commandments. Men were not damned for the crimes they committed but for not believing in the great truths of the Gospel. If men had faith in the efficacy of Christ's sacrifice, they might be under no dread of what they did, because he stood clean before the eyes of God from the day in which Christ died upon the cross.

At the same time, by the early 18th century, Anglican clergymen had increasingly more difficulty in justifying the traditional notion that one's final moments were of critical significance and that a good death could outweigh a less than exemplary life.

=== Religious toleration at Newgate Prison ===
The rise of effective religious toleration at Newgate brought the end of the Ordinary's monopoly over the confessions of the condemned.

Many criminals took a functional approach to religion: numerous Catholics, dissenters and Jews were willing to conform to Anglican services. There was an almost universal desire to receive the sacrament, even if it was seen only as a charm, or passport to the next world. For the majority of 17th and 18th century prisoners, the Ordinary was the only means of obtaining that necessary passport, in exchange of their confessions.

From 1735, ministers of other denominations were allowed to counsel the criminals by the Court of Aldermen. Most officials were willing to uphold the principle that criminals were entitled to be attended by a minister of their own communion at the place of execution. Because of that, Ordinaries found themselves unable to give any report of the lives of criminals who were under the care of another priest, especially in the case of Catholics, who didn't want the secrets of their confessions to be promulgated. Complains of other priests "poaching" the condemned confessions mounted over the course of the 18th century.

== Verification ==
The contents of the Accounts can be for the most part verified from external sources.

The same information regarding the trial (such as the nature of the offence, the date, the verdict and the sentence of the Court, specification of the goods stolen and their value in cases of theft) can be found in The Proceedings of the Old Bailey, in the Middlesex or London City's record offices and in parishes registers. The description of the trial is confirmed in all its particulars.

The vital information included in the short biographies, the criminal's birthday, his birthplace and age, can be confirmed by the Proceedings and parish registers and there is external evidence regarding other miscellaneous facts like his religion, aliases used and potential reputation as a particular type of criminal as well. Finding corroboration of the criminal's work history is more difficult: since in the 18th century work relations underwent fundamental changes and much work was casual, seasonal or conducted outside of traditional juridical standards, written documents attesting work transactions are hard to come by. Still, where we can find some external evidence it confirms the condemned account.

Speaking of the other extended narratives, it is certainly possible that some could have been written by the condemned themselves as stated by the Accounts. They provided an account of the crimes committed as single episodes without exterior framework of life or work that might place them in a casual order and with a great deal of details about every crime. Cant language (or Cant tongue) was often employed; born in spoken speech, it was a language used by criminals for the purpose of concealment and mutual recognition. Its presence makes it likely that whoever composed the narratives wrote them in close association with the criminal. The enjoyment in exposing techniques and in explaining particular types of thieving and the way in which the repenting tone that appears everywhere else in the Accounts is minimised are other characteristics which could point to a different author than the Ordinary. Where there are exaggeration, errors and embellishments we could attribute them to the bluster or self-deception of men speaking their last words before their execution.

The contradictions between the Ordinary's and other accounts can be found in the differences of tone used; the real problem is not the Ordinary's imaginative power, but his credulity or sensitivity to the fantasies of criminals sentenced to die.

== See also ==
- Newgate Calendar

== Bibliography ==
- Clive Emsley, Tim Hitchcock and Robert Shoemaker, "The Proceedings: Ordinary of Newgate's Accounts", Old Bailey Proceedings Online (www.oldbaileyonline.org, version 7.0, 5 November 2015 )
- Faller, Lincoln B. (1987). Turned to Account: The Forms and Functions of Criminal Biography in Late Seventeenth- and Early Eighteenth-Century England. Cambridge: Cambridge University Press. ISBN 0-521-06562-3
- Linebaugh, Peter (1991). The London Hanged: Crime and Civil Society in the Eighteenth Century. London: The Penguin Press. ISBN 0-713-99045-7
- Linebaugh, Peter, "The Ordinary of Newgate and his Account" in J.S. Cockburn, ed., Crime in England 1550–1800. London: Methuen & Co Ltd (1977). ISBN 0-416-83960-6
- McKenzie, Andrea (2007). Tyburn's Martyrs: Execution in England, 1675–1775. London: Bloomsbury Academic.
- McKenzie, Andrea, "From True Confessions to True Reporting? The Decline and Fall of the Ordinary’s Account", London Journal, 30:1 (2005), 55–70.
