= Sam Hall (song) =

Traditional song

Song
- Genre: Folk
- Songwriter: Traditional

"Sam Hall" (Roud 369) is an English folk song about an unrepentant criminal condemned to death for robbing the rich to feed the poor. Prior to the mid-19th century it was called "Jack Hall", after Jack Hall, a thief who was hanged at Tyburn in 1707. Jack Hall's parents sold him as a climbing boy for one guinea, which is why most versions of the song identify Sam or Jack Hall as a chimney sweep.

== History ==
The Fresno State University website states that the printed collection Wit and Mirth, or Pills to Purge Melancholy, dated to 1719, has a version of "Jack Hall". The Bodleian Library has a printed version called "Jack the Chimney Sweep", dated between 1819 and 1844.

Prior to 1988, the song had been collected from about 18 singers in the oral tradition, limited to England and the United States, and there had been only six sound recordings made. Comic performer W. G. Ross adapted one version in the 1840s and changed the name from "Jack Hall" to "Sam Hall". The song also appears to have been adapted to fit the region in which it was sung; some versions refer to Sam Hall being hanged at Tyburn, some at Cootehill. Also it is unclear what, if any, uncouth language was original to the song. Various versions have Sam Hall call his executioners "muckers", "fuckers", "buggers", "muggers", "critters" or "bastards".

Some versions end each verse with the lines

I hate you, one and all
And I hate you, one and all
Damn your eyes.

The melody of the song was taken from the song "Captain Kidd", aka "Robert Kidd", written shortly after the execution of William Kidd in 1701.

A more vulgar variant has become an enduring cultural phenomenon among United States Air Force pilots. Known as "Sammy Small", this may be the best known drinking song among American fighter pilots. Covered by Dos Gringos in 2006 on their album 2, the lyrics have remained consistent at least since the Vietnam War.

Regarding the metrics and the melody, the version common in Ireland and Britain ("Oh my name it is Sam Hall, chimney sweep...") appeared to be based on the tune "Ye Jacobites by Name" (Roud number 5517), whereas the version more common in the US ("My name it is Sam Hall, 'Tis Sam Hall...") is a variant of the tune to "Frog Went A-Courting" (Roud number 16).

== American version ==
A distinct American version of the song, with the opening line "My name it is Sam Hall, it is Sam Hall" (or "Samuel Hall"), where the character is about to be hanged for murder, and various other often rude modifications, developed and became widely popular among cowboys in the American West, including in the Oklahoma range. This was fairly typical of cowboy songs, which were often adapted from traditional English ballads. The earliest known publication of this version of the song is found in Max Brand's novel Trailin'! (1919). It was collected by Hubert L. Canfield (1920s), Harold Scott (1926), Mellinger E. Henry (1931), and John and Alan Lomax (1934).

American Country music singer Tex Ritter adapted the song, and recorded it as a single in 1935. He sang it again in the film The Old Corral / Song of the Gringo (1936), and recorded a version for his 1960 album Blood on the Saddle. It was also recorded by many other artists. Oscar Brand performed the song on Bawdy Songs and Backroom Ballads volume 1 (1955). In concert, e.g. Le Hibou Coffee House, Ottawa, 1966, Brand used the following lyric: "... My name is Samuel Hall and I hate you one and all, You're a bunch of fuckers all, Goddamn your eyes, Son of a bitch, Shit." If a young person came into the club, Brand would edit this for comic effect to "... Gall darn his eyes, Son of a gun, Shucks." Josh White recorded a version of the song, included on The Story Of John Henry (1955). Carl Sandburg, poet and Abraham Lincoln biographer, recorded it twice, once in 1964, as "Sam Hall" and later as "Gallows Song". Johnny Cash recorded a version of this song on Ballads of the True West (1965), re-recording it for American IV: The Man Comes Around (2002). The band Flogging Molly used the Johnny Cash version as an intro for their concerts. Ed Kuepper covered this song on his album The Exotic Mail Order Moods of Ed Kuepper (1995). The self-professed "steamcrunk" band Walter Sickert & The Army of Broken Toys performed a version of this song on their album Steamship Killers (2010).

The song was used in several plays, books, films and television shows. Lynn Riggs included the song, as arranged by Margaret Larkin, in his 1931 play Green Grow the Lilacs, the play that would later be adapted with new songs as the Rodgers and Hammerstein musical Oklahoma! (1943). It was referenced in Jim Thompson's first novel, Now and On Earth (1942), and Eudora Welty's novel, Delta Wedding (1946). Poul Anderson's 1953 novelette "Sam Hall" features a disgruntled bureaucrat who creates fake records about a rebel named Sam Hall (after the song) who fights against the totalitarian government. Poul Anderson and Gordon R. Dickson's short story "Yo Ho Hoka!" (1955), has the Hokas sing this song as they are being hanged. [Note: this is comical, as the Hokas' necks are stronger than those of humans, so they just hang each other for fun. It's a strange world]. The song, performed by Terry Gilkyson, was the main musical theme of the 1956 film Star in the Dust directed by Charles F. Haas, with John Agar, Mamie van Doren and Richard Boone as Sam Hall in the main roles. Dennis Hopper sings the opening line of the song in an episode of The Lieutenant, "To Set It Right" (1964). Clint Eastwood recites it in the movie Two Mules for Sister Sara (1970).

== Recordings ==
- Swedish/Dutch troubadour Cornelis Vreeswijk made a Swedish translation called "Mördar-Anders" on his album Visor och oförskämdheter (1965), which also included "Brev från kolonien", a loose translation of Allan Sherman's "Hello Muddah, Hello Fadduh".
- English actor, Alfie Bass, performed a notable version of the song on Birth Of The Music Hall LP (1968) along with "Villikins and his Dinah" and "The Ratcatcher's Daughter".
- The Dubliners recorded it on At Home with the Dubliners (1969).
- The Irish Rovers performed this song on their 1969 album The Life of the Rover.
- A version of "The Ballad of Sam Hall" by the actor, Peter Sellers, was recorded at Wilton's Music Hall in East London in 1970.
- Performed in the epilogue of Masterpiece Theatre season 4, episode 9 (1974): Upstairs, Downstairs II, "Rose's Pigeon". Ending segment with the Player's Theatre, John Rutland as Samuel Hall, with introduction by Alistair Cooke.
- Irish folk singer Paddy Reilly often performed a version of this song in concert, referencing Cootehill as the hanging place. It appears on the 1983 album Paddy Reilly Live.
- Frank Tovey performed the song on his album, Tyranny & the Hired Hand (1989).
- Steeleye Span included the song (as "Jack Hall") on the album Tempted and Tried in 1989 and also released it as the B-side of their single "The Fox" in 1990.
- The Irish Descendants performed this song in its traditional Irish form on their album Misty Morning Shore (1991), and re-released it on their compilation albums So Far so Good: The Best of the Irish Descendants (1999), and We are the Irish Descendants (2004).
- Black 47 recorded a version of this song for their Green Suede Shoes album, released in 1996.
- The Canadian Celtic punk band The Mahones performed a version of the song on their album T.A.F.K.A.H.I.M. (1997).
- The French singer Alain Bashung recorded a French drum and bass version of this song for his album Fantaisie militaire (1998). The song is renamed "Samuel Hall" and is credited to Olivier Cadiot and Rodolphe Burger.
- The Pilgrims (a British band) recorded a version of this song on their album, Here To Stay (1998).
- Swill (also of The Men They Couldn't Hang) and the Swaggerband recorded a version of the song for their 2006 album Doh, Ray, ME, ME, ME, Me, Me featuring Cootehill as the location for the execution.
- Nick Oliveri and the Mondo Generator performed the song and included it as a hidden track on the 2006 album, Dead Planet: SonicSlowMotionTrails.
- Richard Thompson performed the song live as an encore on his 1000 Years of Popular Music collection (2006).
- Poor Angus, a Canadian Celtic and folk band, performed a version of "Sam Hall" on their 2007 self-titled album.
- Rocky Creek, a Dayton, Ohio Celtic bluegrass band performed a version on Our Celtic Beginnings (2007).
- "Sam Hall" is referred in the radio adaptation of "The Remarkable Performance of Mr. Frederick Merridew", a Bert Coules original story from the third series of The Further Adventures of Sherlock Holmes (2008), in which Mr. Merridew (played by Hugh Bonneville) is a music hall actor who, in the persona of Samuel Hall, recites a version of the song in which he confesses a murder and his defiance against the public.
- Trevor Crozier sang this song on the album Let's All Go to the Music Hall (2008, label Hallmark).
- The Dregs, a band at the Minnesota Renaissance Festival, performed a version on their CD, Thank You Sir, May I Have Another? (2008).
- A 19th century version is sung by Sam Shepard (as Butch Cassidy) and Eduardo Noriega, the actors who portrayed the main characters in Blackthorn, a Bolivian western movie released in 2011.
- Ten Strings and a Goat Skin, a PEI-based folk trio, performs a version on their 2011 debut album.
- Adapted by the Derbyshire, UK-based folk singer songwriters David Gibb and Elly Lucas in 2012 for their album Old Chairs To Mend in the song entitled "Sam Hall".
- The Mudmen performed this song on their 2012 album, Donegal Danny.
- Sam Carter recorded "Jack Hall" on his 2012 album No Testament, with Sam Sweeney of the British folk group Bellowhead on violin. The duo also performed the song live on Later... with Jools Holland on 17 October 2012.
- In Season 3 and 4 of The Expanse (2018–2019), a song based on "Sam Hall", called "Tili Go" is sung by the character of Klaes Ashford (played by David Strathairn) in Belter Creole.
- Eric Clapton performed a version of the song at the Nippon Budokan, in April 2023. He later recorded a version of the song for his album Meanwhile, which was released on 4 October 2024.
- Irish folk band Amble released a studio recorded cover of the song on 6 December 2024 as a single.
