= W. G. Ross =

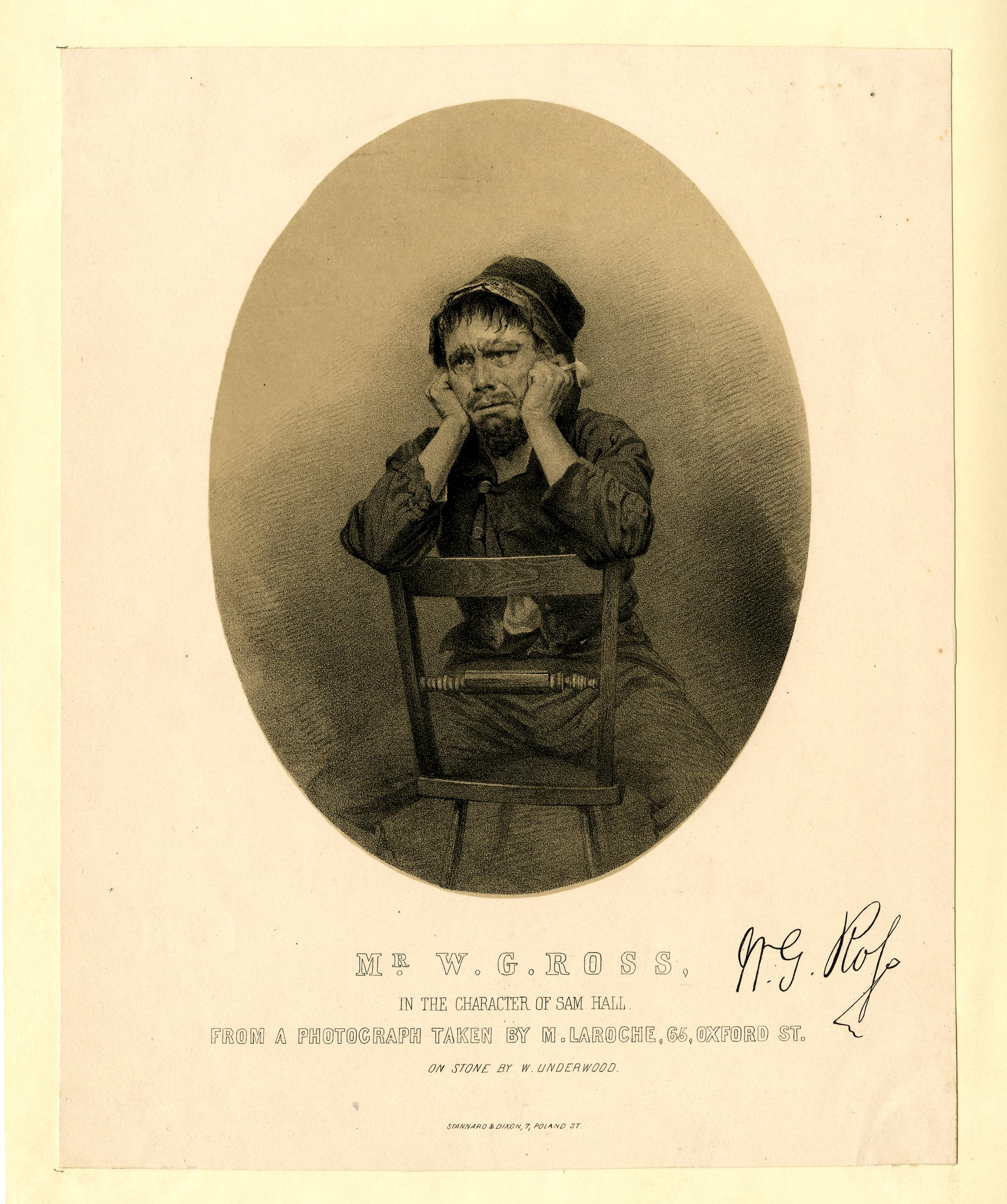
- Ross as 'Sam Hall'
- Born: William Gribbon Ross; 31 July 1819; Glasgow, Scotland
- Died: 23 April 1881 (aged 61); Camden, London, England
- Occupations: Singer, actor

William Gribbon Ross (31 July 1819 – 23 April 1881) was a Scottish actor and singer who became a popular entertainer in London in the mid-nineteenth century.

== Biography ==
Ross was born in Glasgow, and worked on newspapers there as a compositor. His "early history as an unsuccessful and untalented actor is obscure", though it is believed that he acted and sang locally before moving to England to perform.

By the 1840s, he was in London, and became a regular performer at the Cyder Cellar in Covent Garden. He sang a wide range of songs, but his fame rested on just one, "Sam Hall", which had originated some years earlier as the story of a habitual criminal. He performed the song in character as a chimney sweep awaiting execution, "sitting astride a chair, the effect of his tattered clothes and bedraggled hat increased by the blackened clay pipe held between his teeth, which was removed only for purposes of expectoration, and for the greater emphasis of the oaths which bespatter the verses." The song was notorious for its refrain of "Damn your eyes!", sometimes replaced by a stronger expletive.

Ross's performances drew large crowds, and were "unanimously held to possess a degree of power. ... for a number of years, a crowded room was assured whenever Ross was announced." The critic W. J. MacQueen-Pope said that "as a piece of characterisation of its kind, it is doubtful if it was ever excelled," and Henry Chance Newton described Ross as a "really comic comic singer and splendid character actor ... bringing down the house as he always did with his drolleries". Ross's performances were seen by Thackeray, who referred to them in his novel Pendennis.

Ross performed other songs, including "Hamlet Ye Dane", as well some written by Charles Sloman, but they were much less successful. By the late 1850s, the craze for "Sam Hall" had diminished, and Ross returned to the regular stage, sometimes appearing in touring musical comedy shows with his daughter, Lillian Ross. He made theatrical appearances in London as an actor, and performed an impersonation of Richard III.

He died in Camden, London, in 1881 (though one source gives 1876) and was buried in Kensal Green Cemetery.
