= Willinger =

Willinger is a surname. Notable people with the surname include:

- Aloysius Joseph Willinger (1886–1973), American bishop
- Jason Willinger (born 1972), American actor and voice actor
- László Willinger (1909–1989), German photographer
- Marian Willinger, American scientist
- Wilhelm Willinger
