= Lea Niako =

German dancer and actress (1908–?)

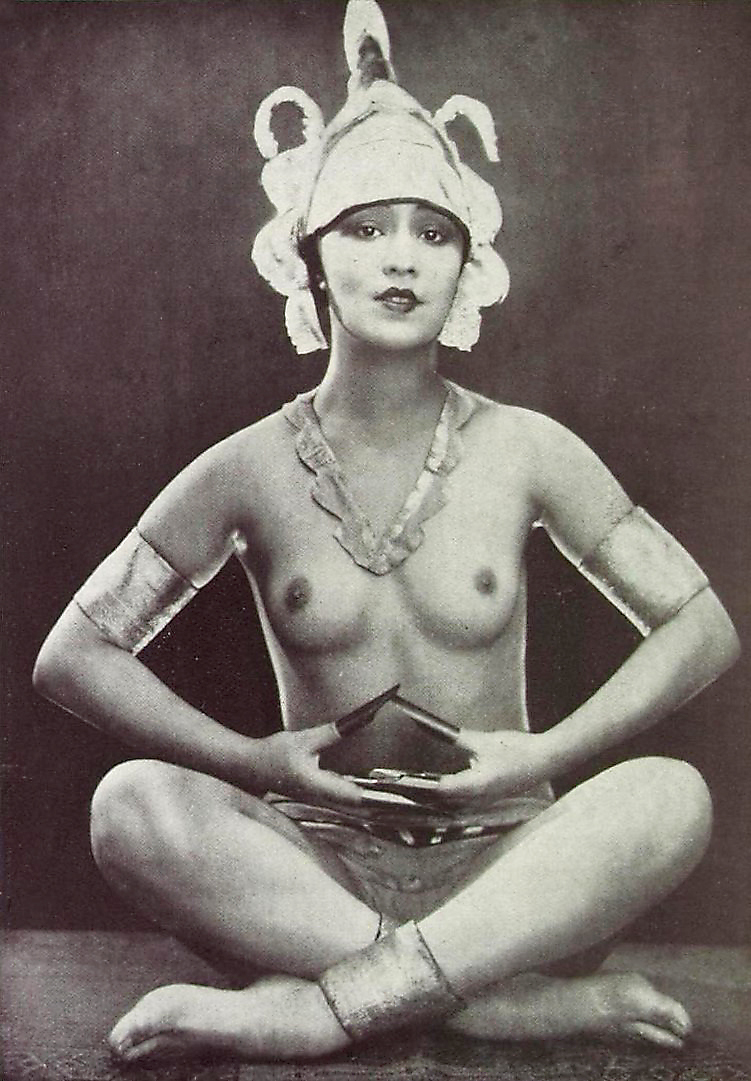
- Photograph by Wilhelm Willinger, c. 1926 for Das Leben (1923–1934)
- Born: Maria Kruse; 1908; Hamburg, German Empire
- Died: Unknown, after 1950
- Occupations: Exotic dancer and actress
- Known for: Involvement with Polish spy Jerzy Sosnowski

Maria Kruse (1908–?), better known by her stage name Lea Niako, was a German exotic dancer and actress. Niako was renowned across Europe for her dance performances in the late interwar period, from 1926 to 1933. She often performed with little to no clothes; nude dancing, or Nackttanz, was at the time popular and was seen as an artistic expression of modernity and emancipation. For her unusual and exotic performances, she garnered great attention in the international press. She also broke through into the film industry, appearing in the Portuguese film Fátima Milagrosa (1928) and the Spanish film La Carta (1931).

Niako is most famous for her involvement in the German arrest of the Polish spy Jerzy Sosnowski in 1934. She met and fell in love with Sosnowski in Budapest in 1933, not knowing that he was a spy. After Sosnowski told her in Berlin of his espionage activities and she learnt of his numerous affairs with other women she panicked and confided with an acquaintance, who unbeknownst to her passed the information on to the SS. The Abwehr were also already pursuing an investigation into Sosnowski at the time. Niako later withdrew her testimony and might have alerted Sosnowski to his impending arrest but they were both apprehended in early 1934. Upon finding out that Niako's information had reached the SS, Sosnowski accused her of being his accomplice, determined to drag her down with him.

Niako was spared from punishment through the intervention of Walter Schellenberg of the SS, who transferred her to his office for unspecified activities, with the threat that the prosecution against her could be resumed at any time she chose not to co-operate with him. Niako had a strained relationship with the Nazi authorities. Her career suffered owing to the Sosnowski affair and she was rarely allowed to perform. In early 1938 she was arrested for treason but shortly thereafter pardoned. She made some further film appearances; her last known acting role was a dancer in the German propaganda film Carl Peters (1941). Niako survived the end of World War II and held dance performances in Berlin as late as 1950. The eventual date of her death is unknown.

== Personal life ==
Maria Kruse (Note: Some sources alternatively report that her real name was Rosa Kruse or Lea Rosa Kruse. Her last name is also sometimes alternatively spelt as Kruze.) was born in Hamburg in 1908. There exists contradictory accounts on her family background. According to an article on Niako published in the Austrian magazine Die schöne Frau in 1936, her mother was a German woman from the island Fehmarn and her father was Persian. Contradictory later sources have described her father as German and her mother as Persian or her mother as being an actress from Hamburg and her father as being a merchant from Odesa. Niako sometimes presented herself as being Indochinese. She might have had some Japanese ancestry.

Niako characterized her dancing style as a form of Spanish character dancing and she claimed to have spent several years in Spain, studying and practicing local folk dances. Her favorite composers included the Spanish composers Isaac Albéniz and Joaquín Turina.

== Career ==
=== Early career ===
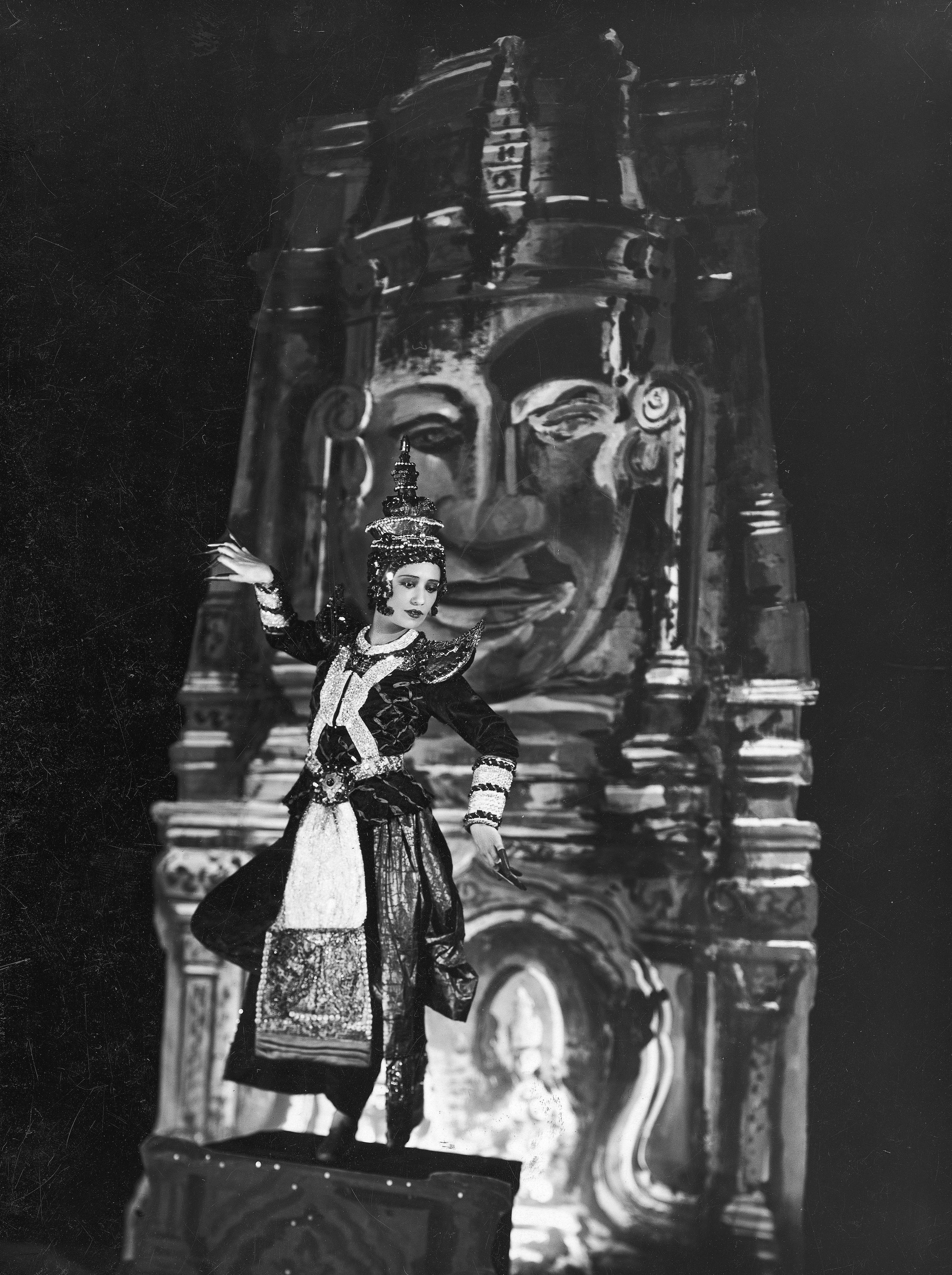
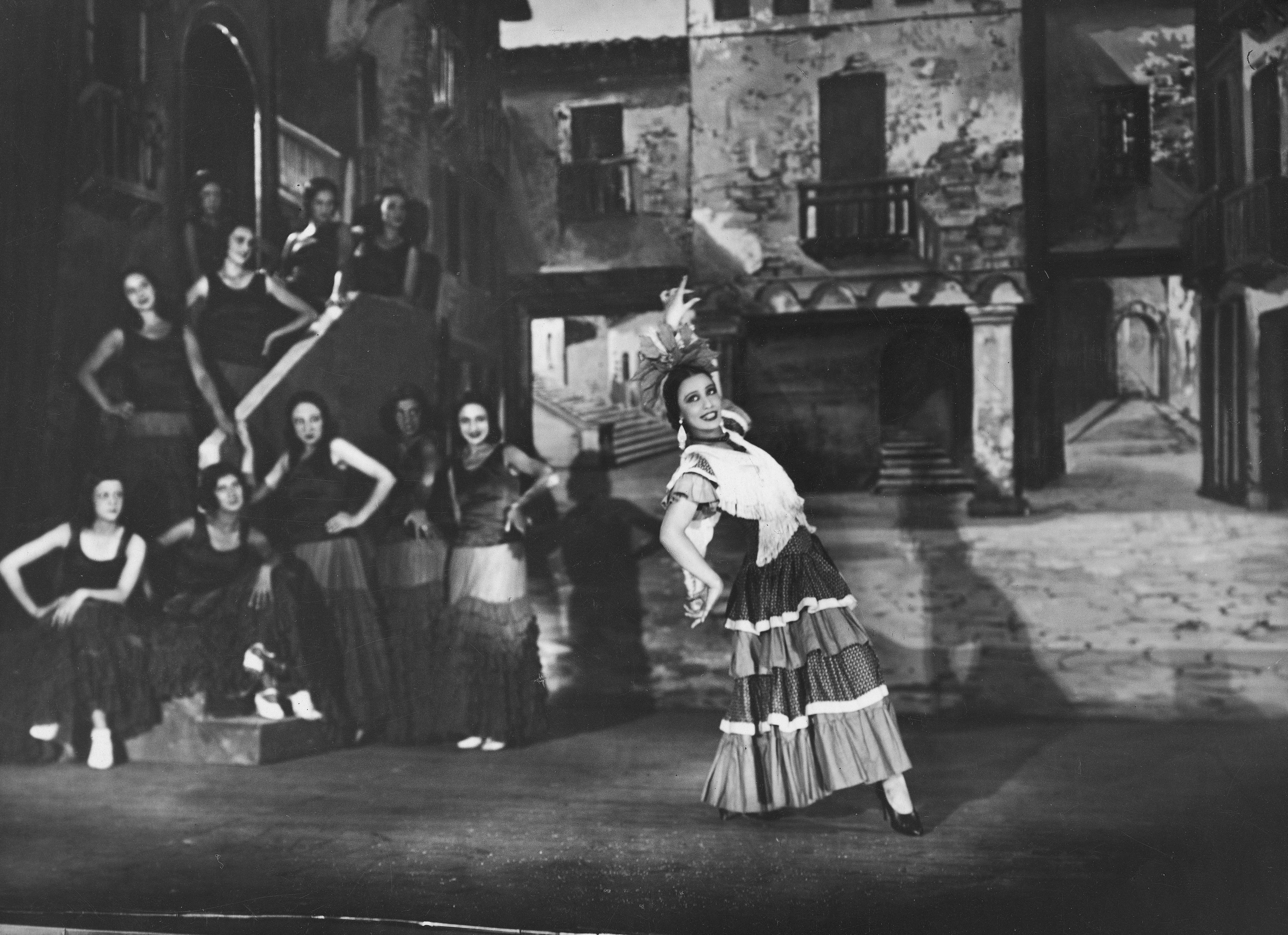
Photographs by Stanisław Brzozowski of Niako performing in Warsaw in 1932

Niako was discovered as a dancer while working at an art company in Montparnasse, Paris. She had begun her dancing career by the summer of 1926. On 4 July that year she performed at the Olympia concert venue in Paris. Niako often performed with little to no clothes and her dances were unusual, exotic, erotic and at times surprisingly modern. Nude dancing, or nackttanz, was at the time popular among female dancers in Germany and elsewhere as an artistic expression of modernity and emancipation. Niako enjoyed great publicity in illustrated magazines. In reviews for her shows, critics at times compared Niako's body to that of classical sculptures. In addition to her stage name, Niako became known by the nickname 'The Ballerina of Berlin'.

Niako performed successfully not only in France but also internationally, holding shows across Europe. Already by September 1926, the Cuban newspaper Diario de la Marina reported on Niako having performed successfully in Vienna. She is recorded to have gone on tours in Portugal in 1927, 1928 and 1929, among other places performing at the Teatro São Luiz in Lisbon. While in Portugal, Niako was also painted by the painter António Soares, a key figure in Portuguese modernism who was fascinated by her beauty. Soares's paintings and drawings of Niako are considered to be among his most significant work. Though Niako's performance received some criticism in Portugal in 1927 owing to her nudity, she was later well received as an artist there in 1928 and 1929.

In 1929, Niako went on a tour in Spain. On 3 March, she performed at the Círculo de Bellas Artes in Madrid and on 20 May she performed in Cartagena. Her performance in Cartagena was announced by the local press as a much anticipated great event owing to her successful performances across the continent over the last two years. After a night of "historical and representative dances" mixed with "delicious oriental" ones in Cartagena, Niako returned to Paris. She also toured in Poland, holding shows there in 1932 and in June 1933.

In 1928, Niako broke through into the film industry. That year she appeared in the Portuguese silent drama film Fátima Milagrosa, directed by Rino Lupo. In 1931 she appeared in her second film role, playing Li-Ti in the Spanish film La Carta, directed by Adelqui Migliar and filmed in France. La Carta was a Spanish-language adaptation of The Letter (1929).

=== Kidnapping incident ===
While filming Fátima Milagrosa in 1927, Niako was a victim of kidnapping. According to a report in the Diário de Lisboa, she was approached by a German-speaking man who told her that he loved her, had long followed her and wanted her. The man captured her and took her to the Boca do Inferno chasm in Cascais, but she was able to escape from him upon arrival there and return home. Her captor was not caught. The kidnapping incident increased Niako's popularity in Portugal during her subsequent visits to the country.

=== Arrest of Jerzy Sosnowski ===
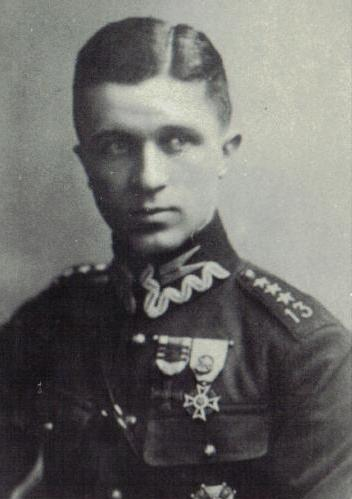
Jerzy Sosnowski

In October 1933, Niako was performing at the Royal Hotel (today called Corinthia) in Budapest. There, she met the Polish officer and (unbeknownst to her) spy Jerzy Sosnowski, who had been there to meet a contact, and the two began a relationship. Sosnowski had lived in Berlin since 1926, posing as the nobleman "Georg von Sosnowski Ritter von Nalecz" and through the seduction of three secretaries within the Ministry of the Reichswehr succeeded in acquiring copies and notes of high-level German military correspondence, including details of the impending German mobilization and the secret cooperation between Germany and the Soviet Union. Sosnowski promised Niako that he would use his money and influence as an aristocrat to make her into a great movie star if she accompanied him back to Berlin. Once in Berlin, Sosnowski for unknown reasons revealed his espionage to Niako, perhaps wishing to make her his partner-in-crime and wishing to use her to seduce German officers. Sosnowski's revelation caused Niako to panic. At the same time, she also learnt of Sosnowski's affairs with numerous other women. Niako then confided with an acquaintance who unbeknownst to her was either a member of the SS or passed the information on.

At the same time, one of the secretaries involved in Sosnowski's scheme was exposed by the Abwehr, who quickly deduced the connection with Sosnowski. The Abwehr had put Sosnowski under watch already in 1932, suspicious of the quick rise of a Polish officer in the Berlin social scene. Although Niako upon realizing that she had exposed Sosnowski to the SS regretted her actions and withdrew her testimony, the SS was now also pursuing an investigation of their own into Sosnowski. At the end of January 1934, two Polish spies arrested by the Abwehr admitted to having connections with Sosnowski. The authorities then moved to arrest Sosnowski, with Josef Kubitzky of the Gestapo put in charge of the operation.

Sosnowski was aware that his arrest was imminent, perhaps having been warned by Niako, but decided to organize a grand farewell ceremony before leaving Berlin, on 24 or 27 February. Niako was to perform a selection of Spanish dances and Sosnowski intended to leave quietly for Warsaw in the middle of the party. Unfortunately for Sosnowski, the Gestapo were aware of the plan; much of the personnel at the party, including the waiters and cloakroom women, were Gestapo agents and his escape car had been rendered unusable. Accounts differ in regard to how the arrest itself transpired; the night ended either with Sosnowski and Niako retiring to his apartment at 36 Lützowufer Street with a small number of the attendees to celebrate her career or developed into an orgy after Niako's performance whereafter Sosnowski left alone around midnight and was arrested by the Gestapo officers present.

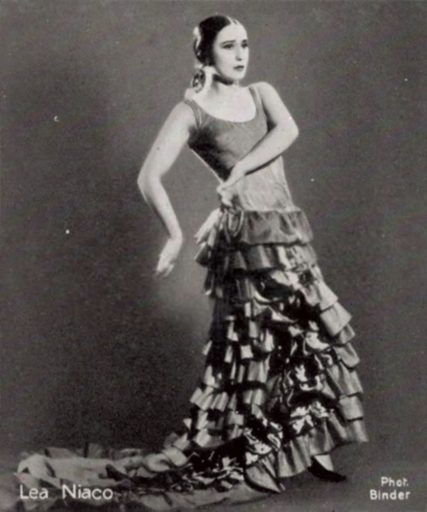
Photograph by Alexander Binder, 1920s

Niako and Sosnowski were questioned together after the party and initially denied every accusation thrown at them. When left alone, Sosnowski noticed that Niako was panting and seemed frantic and she admitted to him that the SS had learnt of his activities because of her. Furious, Sosnowski then began a harsh attack against Niako, determined to drag her down with him. He questioned whether she had been paid to expose him and told the interviewers that she had tried to save him from the arrest, and that her warning to him had given him enough time to send away several of his agents. Sosnowski had also registered Niako among his agents under the code name Antoinette 2–31. Niako began sobbing during Sosnowski's barrage, did not deny his accusations and was promptly arrested as well. Niako was saved from punishment, which could have amounted to execution, after she was personally questioned by Walter Schellenberg of the SS. Schellenberg, believing she could be "salvaged" and perhaps having been smitten by her, intervened on Niako's behalf. With the aid of Joseph Goebbels and Julius Schaub, Schellenberg had Niako transferred to his office with the warning that the prosecution against her could be resumed at any time she chose not to co-operate with him. Niako was the only one of the women involved in Sosnowski's espionage whose name Sosnowski did not attempt to clear during his trial.

=== Life in Nazi Germany and after ===
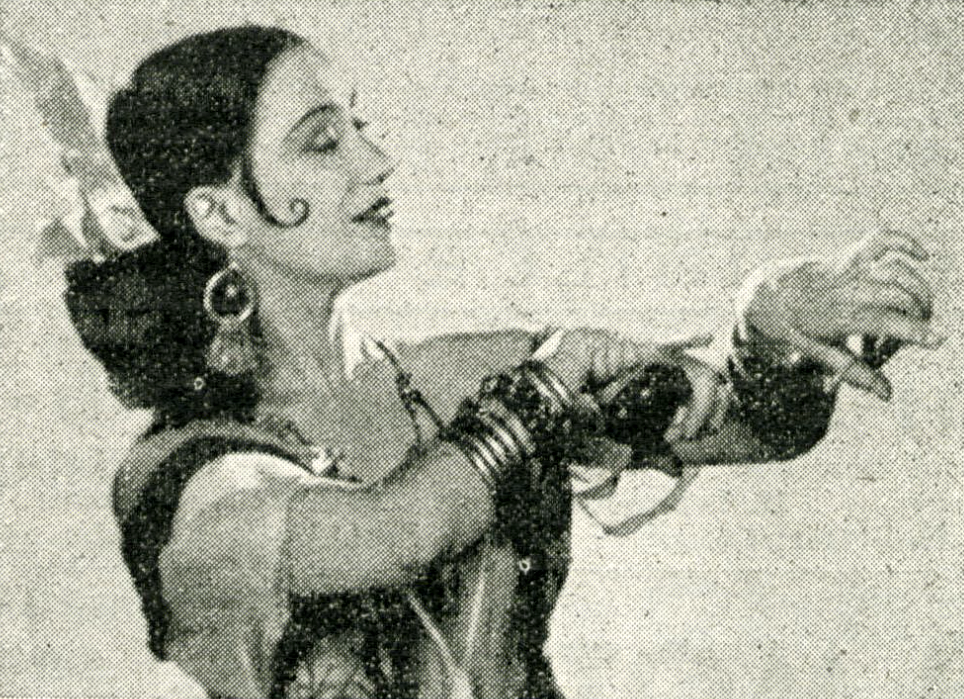
Press photograph, c. 1950

Nothing is known of Niako's life in service of Schellenberg. Niako wished to return to her dancing career, but Goebbels opposed this, noting that it was a 'difficult topic' on account of the Sosnowski affair. In the end, Goebbels helped Niako by arranging a contract with the German Opera House but Niako was almost never allowed to perform. On 8 March 1937, she held a dance performance at the Volksbühne on Horst-Wessel-Platz (today Rosa-Luxemburg-Platz) in Berlin. In January 1938, Niako was arrested and sentenced to nine months in prison for treason but was shortly thereafter pardoned. On 2 February 1938 and 1 March 1939 she again performed at the Volksbühne. Though she no longer performed in the nude, Niako continued to dance erotically and acrobatically, taking inspiration from folk dances to create a unique and atmospheric experience. Her costumes were, at least during this time, designed and made by Henny Kruse.

Unhappy with the lukewarm state of her career, Niako in 1939 personally petitioned Adolf Hitler to help her secure a permanent contract with UFA GmbH, a major film company. Instead of Hitler, she then negotiated with his adjutant Alwin-Broder Albrecht, who only managed to secure for Niako a promise that she would be "given the possibility to act in films with dance sequences". When Niako protested this, Albrecht simply responded that he would not answer any further letters from her.

In 1939, Niako performed a dance routine in Berlin together with the Spanish dancer María Esparza at an event sponsored and attended by the Spanish ambassador Antonio Magaz in favor of a charity for German women and children. Also in 1939, Niako was set to appear in Karl Ritter's German propaganda film Legion Condor, filmed in Spain. Production of the film began on 7 August but the film was cancelled on 1 September. Niako later appeared in Erich Waschneck's drama film Between Hamburg and Haiti (1940) and in Herbert Selpin's German propaganda film Carl Peters (1941). After filming Carl Peters she once more sporadically performed dance routines in Berlin and elsewhere in Germany. She appeared at the Theater am Kurfürstendamm on 4 January 1941, at the Beethovensaal on Köthener Straße on 2 November 1942 and at the Kleines Theater in Baden-Baden on 21 May 1943.

Niako survived through the end of World War II and beyond. On 21 November 1950 she performed her dances for an evening at the Hotel Esplanade in Berlin. Her eventual date of death is unknown.

== Legacy ==
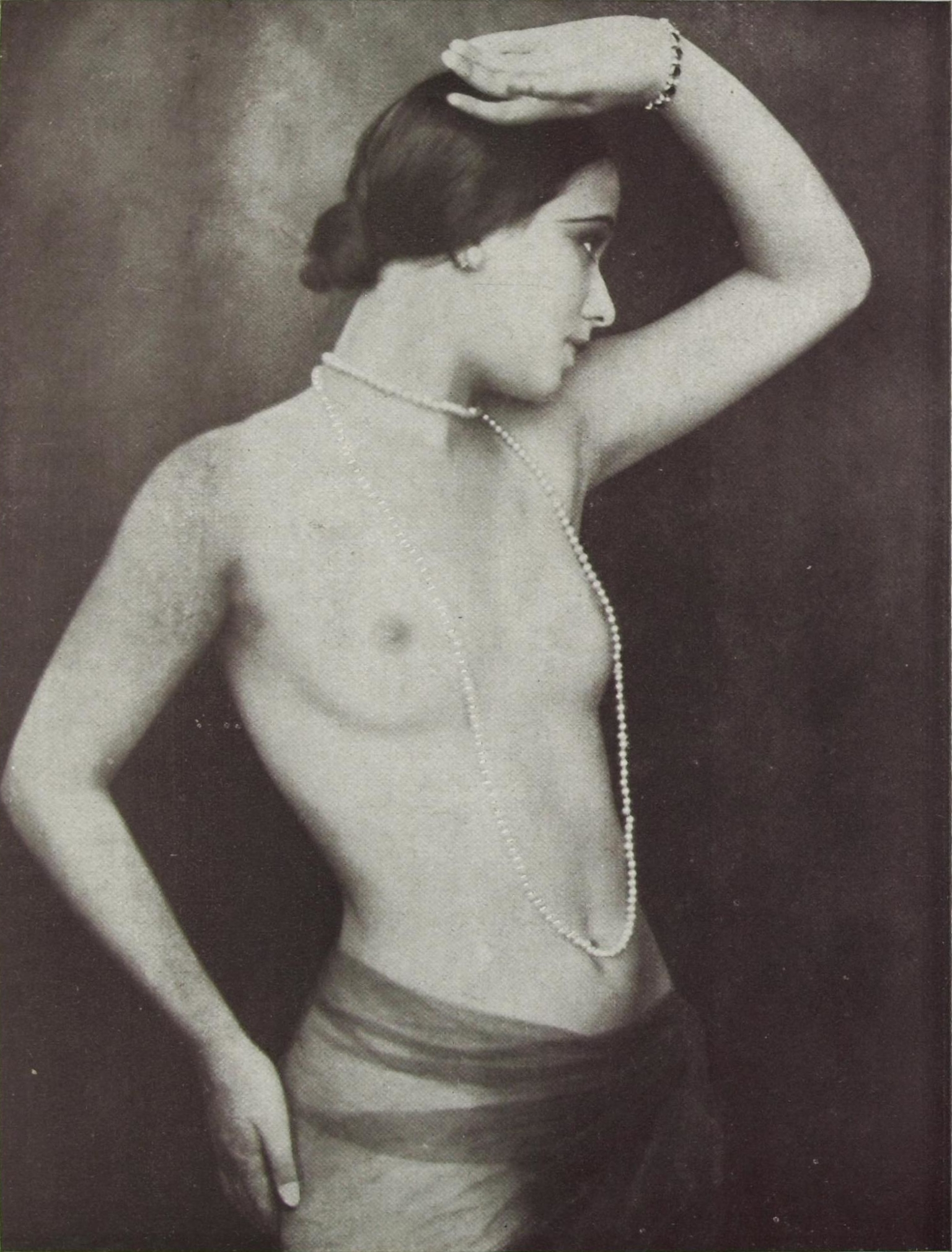
Niako, in Das Leben (1923–1934) by Wilhelm Willinger, c. 1926, published in January 1927

Niako was vilified by later authors, who on account of the Sosnowski affair exaggerated her collaboration and ties with the Nazi regime. The Hungarian and Austrian director Géza von Cziffra (1900–1989) claimed in his memoirs that Niako had a sexual relationship with Hitler. Cziffra further claimed that this relationship had begun as early as 1933, when Niako was involved with Sosnowski, and that secret meetings had been arranged between her and Hitler by Hitler's chief adjutant Wilhelm Brückner. Cziffra's memoirs were deemed to be based on "unsubstantiated speculation" by the English historian Bill Niven in 2018, who concluded that it was perhaps possible that Hitler had assisted her with the UFA contract but that "there is no more to it than that". Despite the complete lack of evidence, the claims have sometimes been exaggerated even further, attaching Niako not only to Hitler but also to Goebbels, Albert Speer and Heinrich Himmler as a "lover of Nazi leaders".

In 2020, the Polish author Marek Łuszczyna suggested that Niako was a German spy who seduced Sosnowski in 1933 on Nazi orders, though admitted that he had no evidence whatsoever for this hypothesis. The Catalan author Joan-Daniel Bezsonoff published a historical fiction novel in 2017 based on the Sosnowski incident and prominently incorporating Niako. Titled La ballarina de Berlín ("The Ballerina of Berlin"), the novel portrays Niako as a villainous figure who seduces Sosnowski on behalf of "her friends" Himmler, Goebbels, Speer and Hitler.

== Filmography ==
Year	Title	Role	Notes
1928	Fátima Milagrosa	Indochinese dancer	
1931	La Carta	Li-Ti	
1939	Legion Condor	(Note: The name of Niako's role in Legion Condor was never disclosed.)	German propaganda film; unreleased
1940	Between Hamburg and Haiti	Dolores	
1941	Carl Peters	Dancer at Piccadilly Club	German propaganda film
