= Marian Willinger =

American scientist

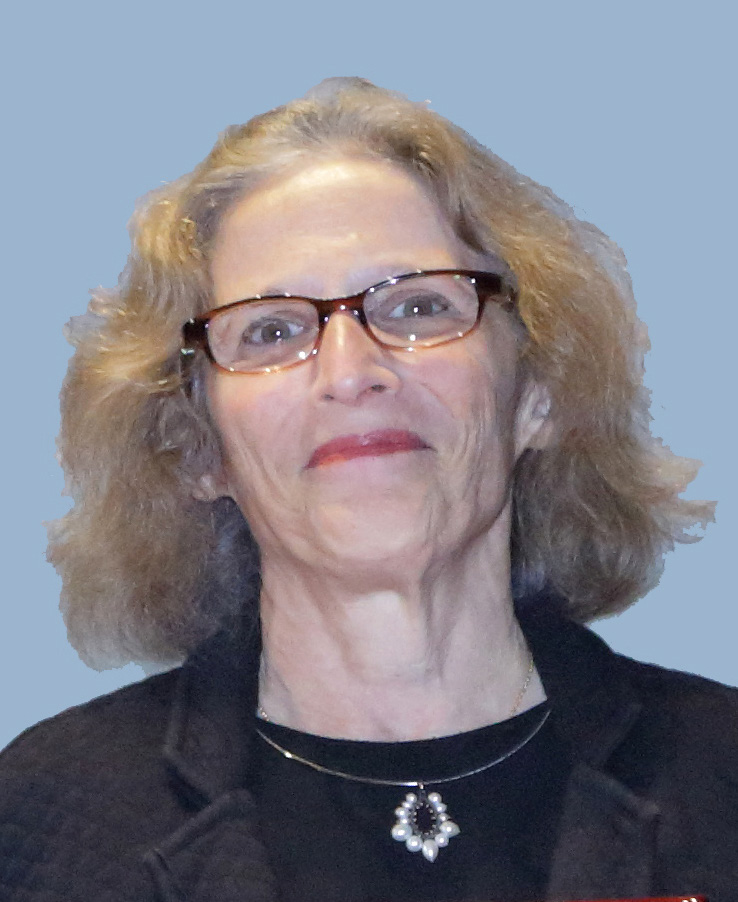
- Education: University of Pennsylvania School of Arts and Sciences (Ph.D.)
- Scientific career
- Fields: Maternal and child health
- Workplaces: National Institute of Allergy and Infectious Diseases; Eunice Kennedy Shriver National Institute of Child Health and Human Development

Marian Doberman Willinger is an American scientist. She was a program officer at the National Institutes of Health where she expanded maternal and child health initiatives.

== Education ==
Willinger completed a Ph.D. in microbiology from the University of Pennsylvania School of Arts and Sciences in 1976. Her dissertation was titled Studies of the fate of surface proteins during phagocytosis by rabbit polymorphonuclear neutrophils.

== Career ==
Willinger joined National Institute of Allergy and Infectious Diseases as a program officer for AIDS research. In 1989, she joined the Eunice Kennedy Shriver National Institute of Child Health and Human Development (NICHD). At NICHD, her interest in maternal and child health led to an opportunity to expand NIH-funded research on SIDS, stillbirth and other causes of infant death. Willinger has served as a SIDS expert ever since, serving on numerous groups and committees dedicated to saving infant lives. Willinger was instrumental in the launch of the Back to Sleep awareness campaign in 1994. The Back to Sleep, now called Safe to Sleep, is widely credited with reducing the rate of sudden infant death syndrome (SIDS)-related deaths in the United States by more than half. Willinger retired from NICHD on May 31, 2017.

== Awards and honors ==
Willinger received several awards during her career, including the NIH Director’s Award and the HHS Secretary’s Award for Distinguished Service.
