= Wilhelm Willinger =

Austro-Hungarian photographer (1879–1943)

Maurus (Mor) Wilhelm (Vilmos) Willinger (9 April 1879 – 29 January 1943) was an Austrian/Hungarian photographer who is best known for his portraits of actors of the early silent film era in Berlin.

== Life ==
Willinger was born in Budapest, Austria-Hungary, and lived there until 1900. From 1902 to 1918, he ran a photo agency in Berlin while maintaining a studio at Orczy út 8 in Pest. He married Margarethe (who ran the darkroom) and they had a son László Willinger (1909–1989) who also became a portrait photographer. In Berlin he was registered in W 30 at Schwäbische Straße 8.

During the First World War, Willinger was an Honvéd officer in the Austro-Hungarian Army.

After the war, in 1919, he established a studio in Vienna together with Hans Schnapper. In 1921, Schnapper left the studio and Willinger became the sole owner. The Willinger & Schnapper company was located in Kärntnerstraße 28 in the First District of Vienna and remained at that address until 1938 when it was taken over by Adolf Hitler's photographer Heinrich Hoffmann. At one point the studio was one of the largest in Vienna with 30 employees. The photo archive was confiscated by the Gestapo soon after 13 March 1938 and apparently dispatched to the Reichspropagandamt [Reich Propaganda Agency] in Berlin later on.

During his time in Vienna, Willinger founded the Organisation der Wiener Presse (Organization of the Vienna Press) with various other photographers in 1924. In 1930 he took over part of the company R. Lechner (Wilhelm Müller) and turned it into the agency for Austrian press pictures Willinger & Lechner. Later he founded the together with Leo Ernst and Friedrich Cesanek sales company Austrophot – Willinger, Ernst & Cesanek.

Eventually, the Atelier Willinger operated in Berlin, Vienna and Paris. The Berlin branch operated from 1920 to 1934 under the name of his wife, Margarete Willinger. It was located at Dorotheenstrasse 72 or 60, and (from 1932 to 1934) at Fasanstrasse 68. Their son also worked in several branches of the studio (Paris & Berlin).

Willinger's work shows a wide variety of motifs and events. He photographed "role portraits" of stage actors, scenes from stage plays and portraits. His photographs can be found in various magazines, newspapers, as well as in books. Court documents from a case in Vienna in 1926 show his marital status as "divorced".

== Exile and death ==
Willinger left Vienna in 1938. He emigrated to Shanghai and was able to ship his photographic equipment with him, where from 1940 he ran his studio, Willinger & Co Shanghai, at 11 Nanking Road.

== Works ==
Photos

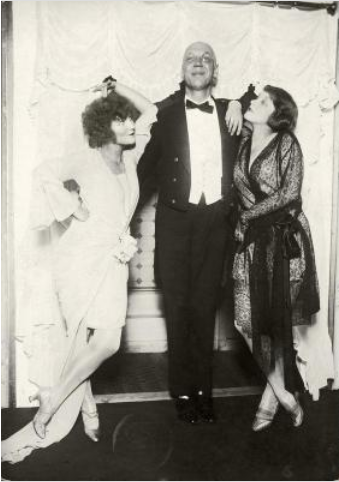
Dore Aldor, Eugen Günther and Marlene Dietrich in Wenn man zu dritt (1927)

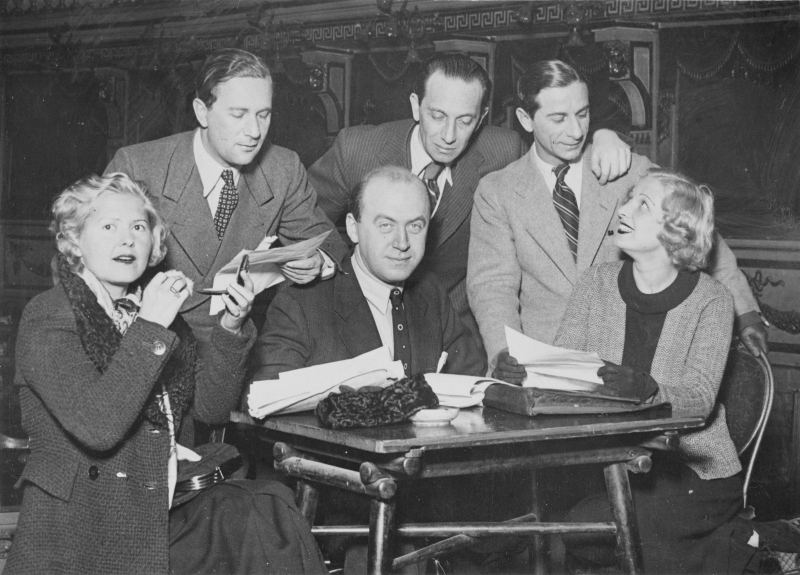
Otto Preminger at Theater an der Wien 1934

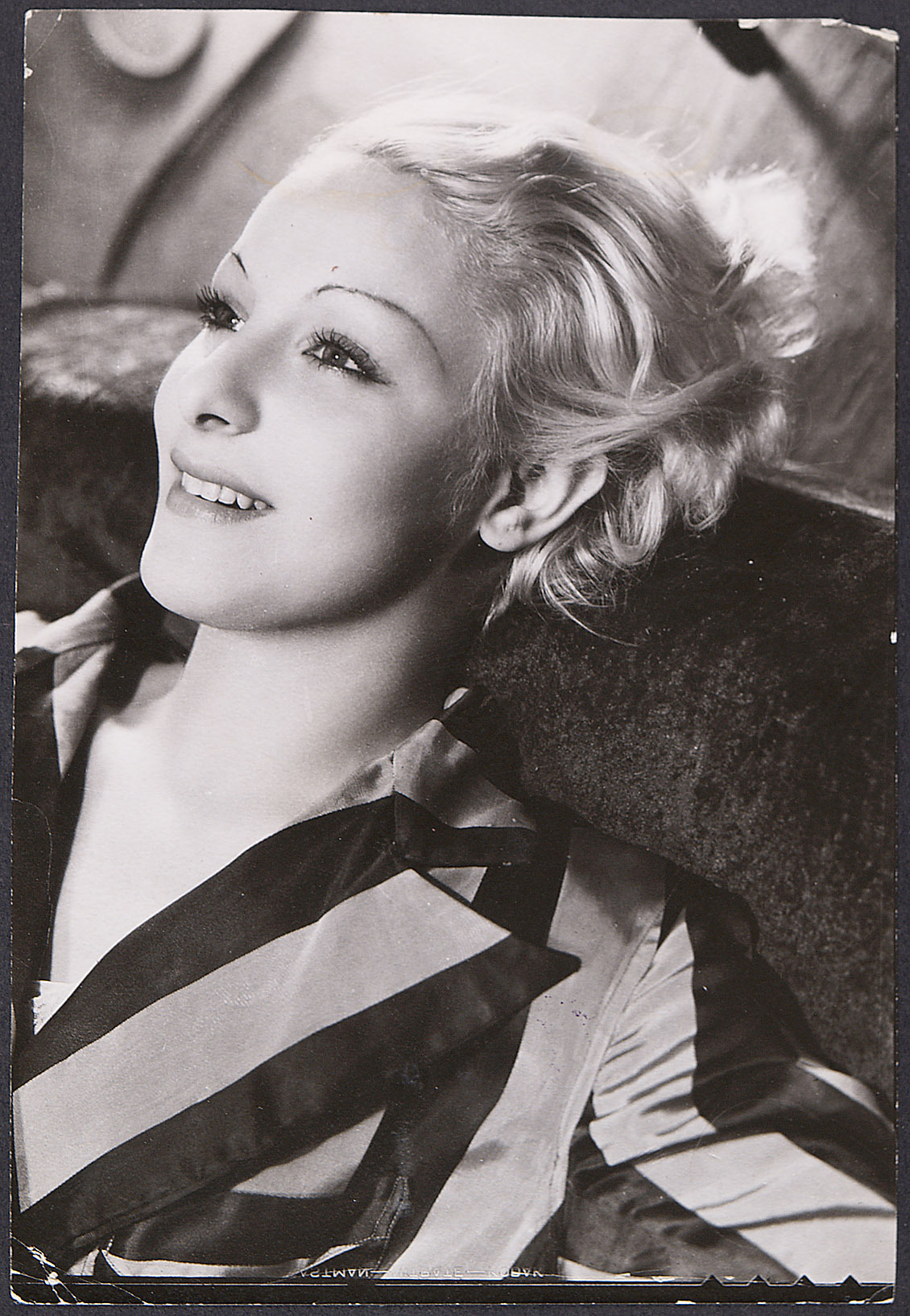
Olivia Fried

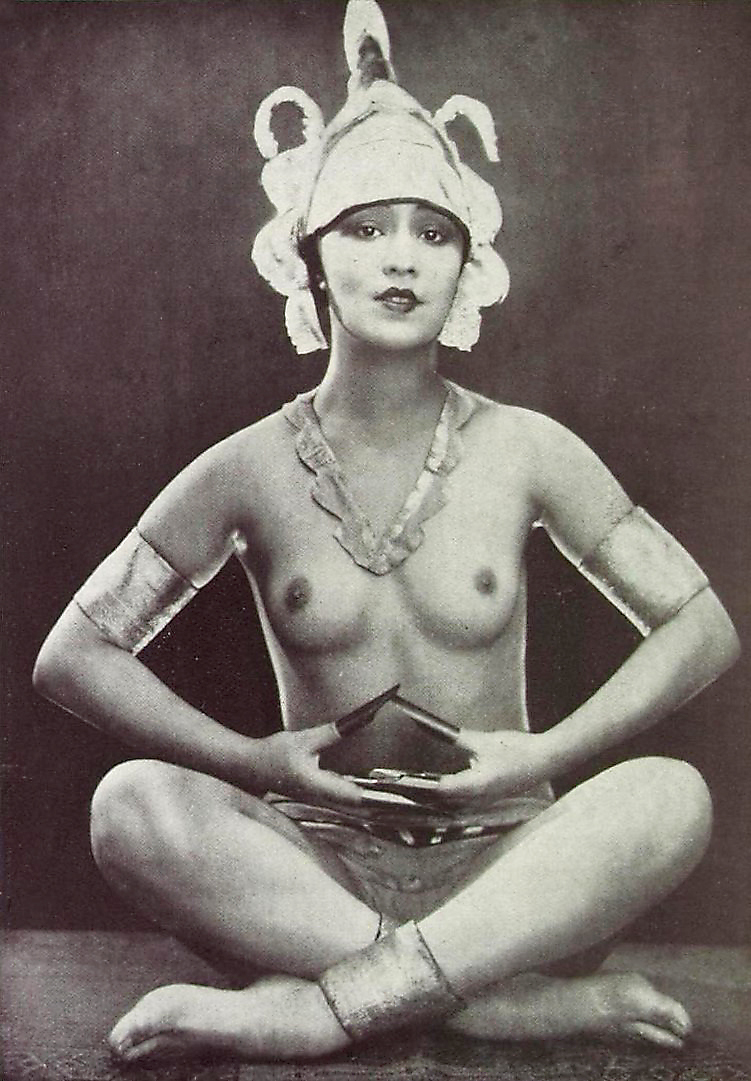
Lea Niako, Das Leben, vol. 4. 1926/27, nr. 7, Januar, p. 653

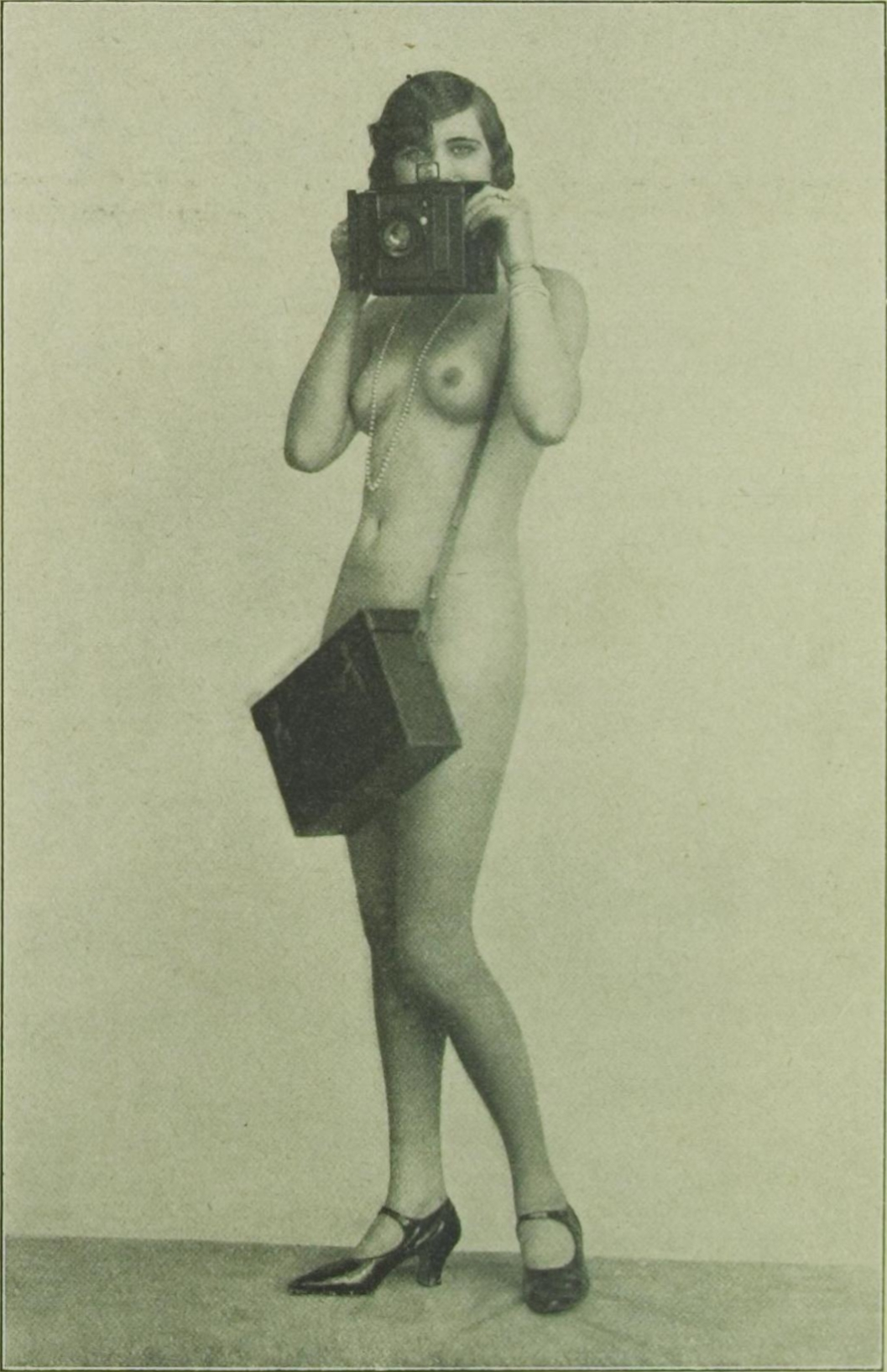
Nackt hinter der Kamera, Das Leben, vol. 5. 1927/28, nr. 6, Dezember, p. 22

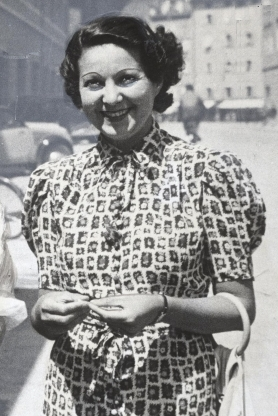
Margit Bokor (1903–1949)

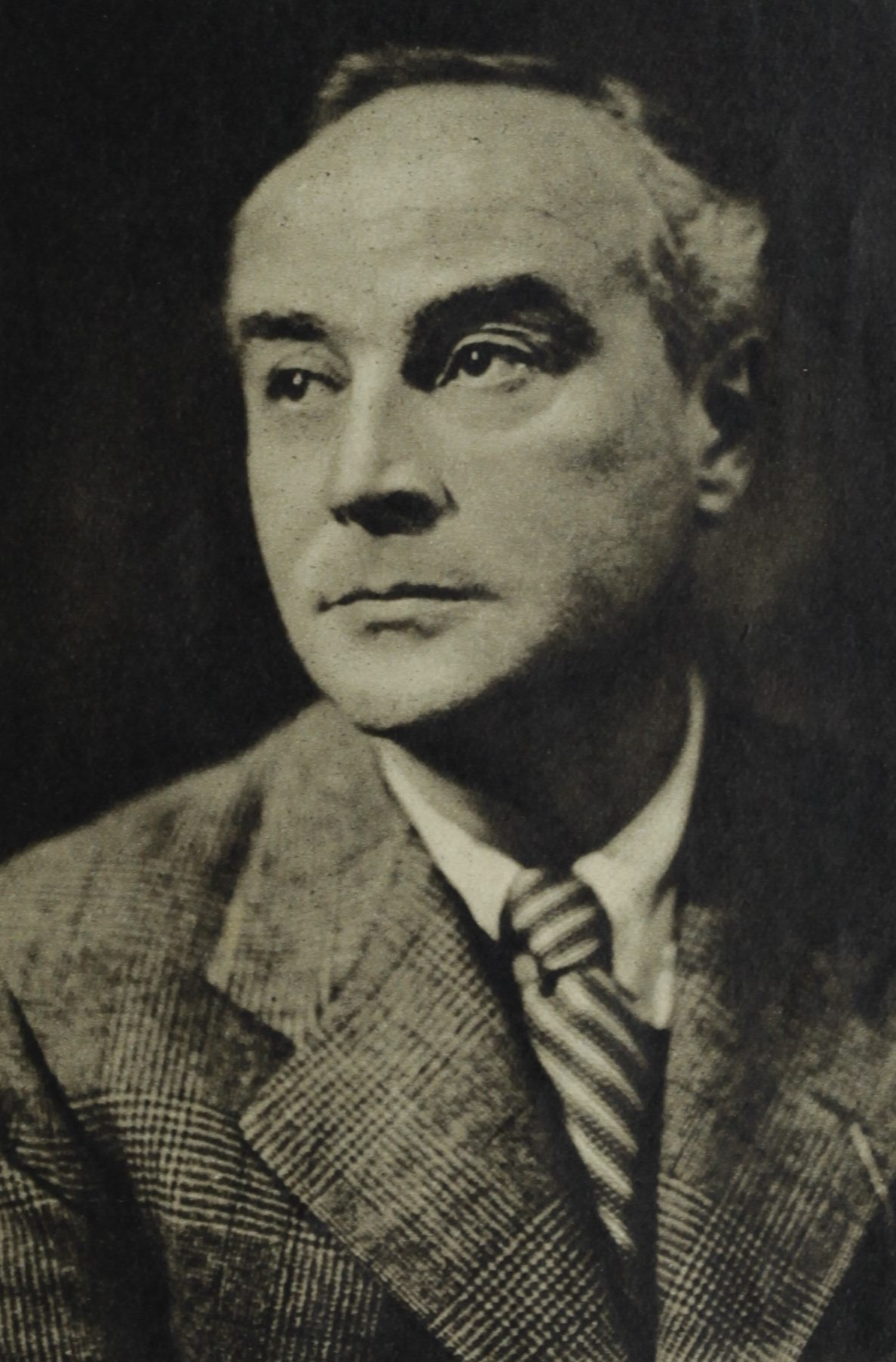
Anton Edthofer (1883–1971) in 1933

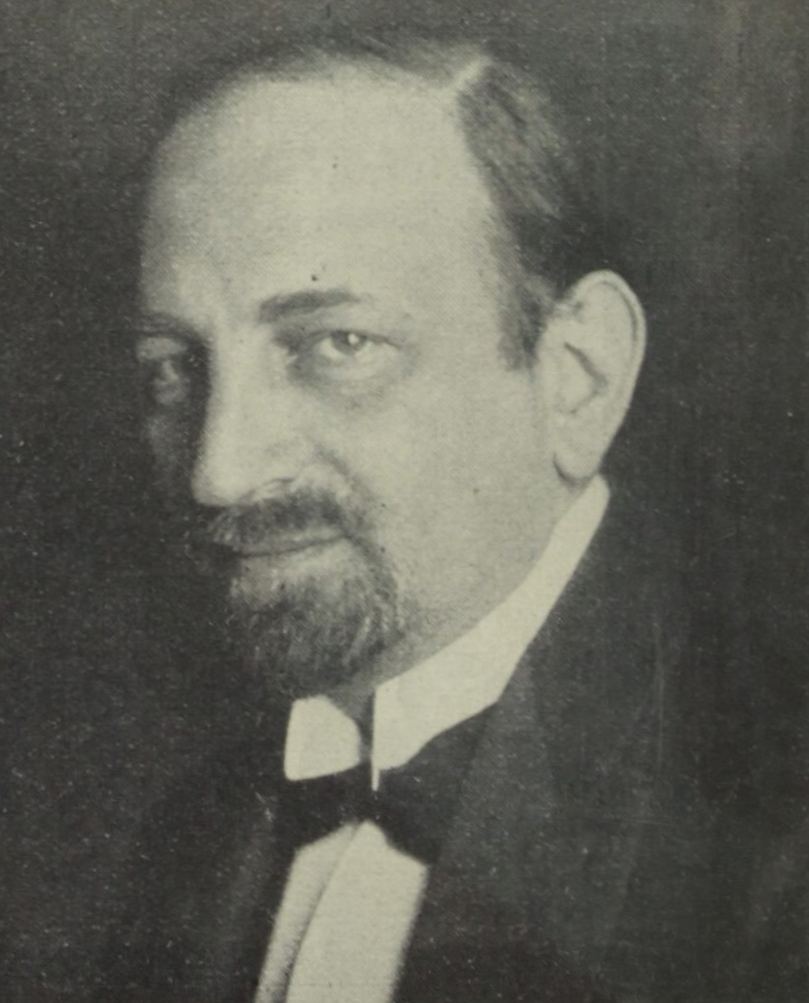
Paul Stefan (1879–1943)

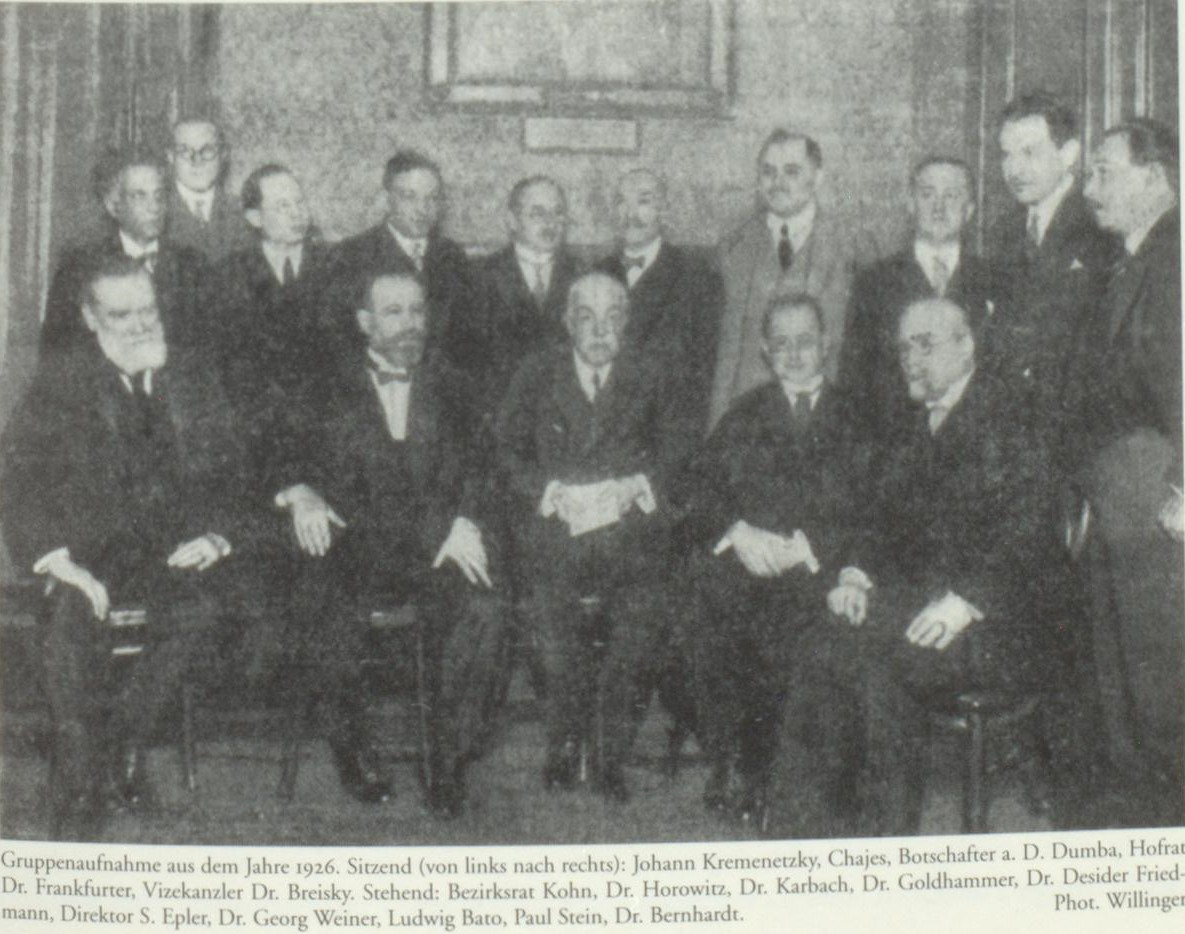
The Jewish League for Austria, 1926

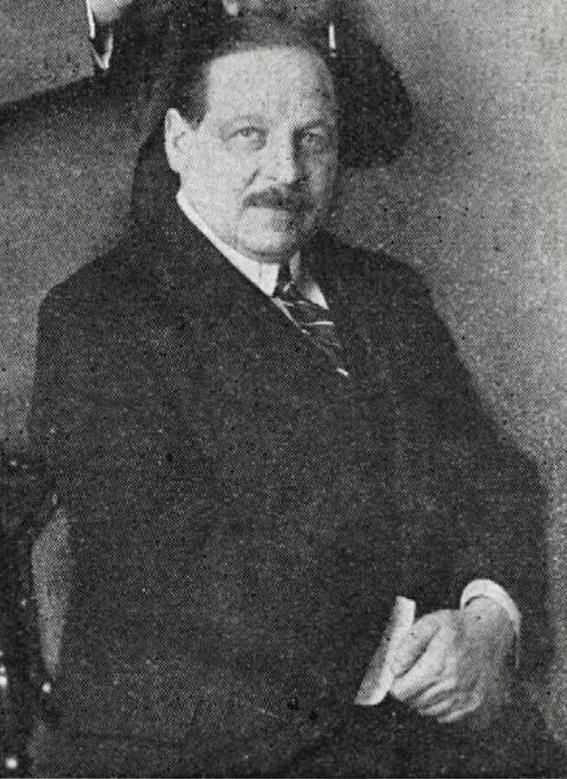
Imre Kálmán

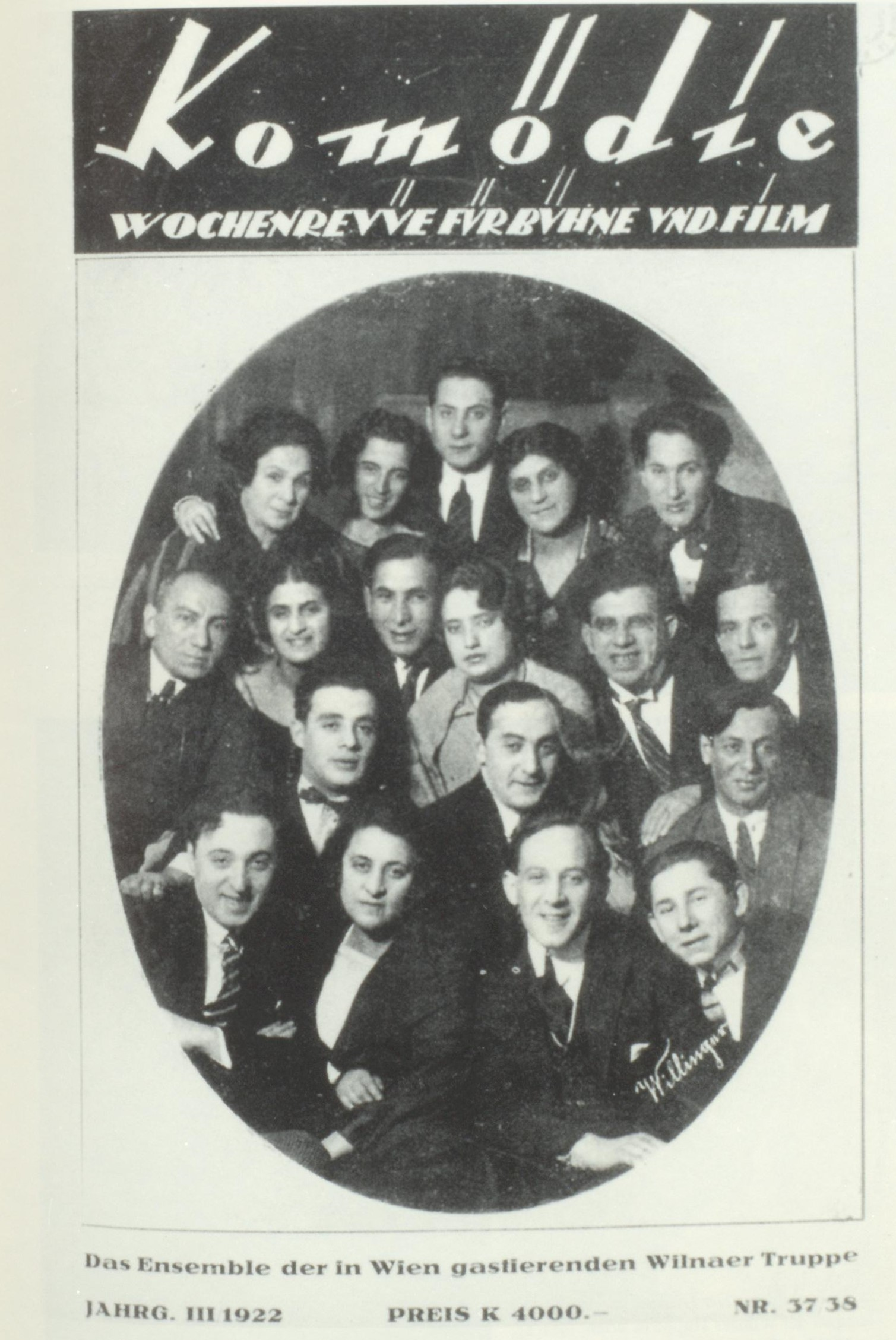
The Wilnauer Troop, Vienna (1922)
