= Greta Bösel =

German nurse and concentration camp guard (1908–1947)

- Born: May 9, 1908; Wuppertal-Elberfeld, Prussia, German Empire
- Died: May 3, 1947 (aged 38); Hamelin Prison, Allied-occupied Germany
- Occupation: Nurse
- Status: Executed by hanging
- Conviction: War crimes
- Trial: Hamburg Ravensbrück trials
- Penalty: Death

Greta Bösel (née Mueller) (9 May 1908 – 3 May 1947) was a Nazi German nurse and camp guard at Ravensbrück concentration camp. She was arrested and tried for her role in the Holocaust, found guilty of war crimes, and executed.

== Nazi atrocities, trial and execution ==
Bösel was born on 9 May 1908 in Wuppertal-Elberfeld, Germany. She was a trained nurse.

Bösel became a camp guard at Ravensbrück in August 1944. Her rank was Arbeitseinsatzführerin (Work Input Overseer), a leading assistant in the camp labour office. In November 1944, Bösel was supposedly a staff member responsible for selecting prisoners for the gas chamber or transfer to Uckermark. She is known to have told another Nazi SS guard "If they [prisoners] cannot work, let them rot."

After the death march of prisoners from Ravensbrück before the impending liberation by the Red Army of Soviet troops, Bösel fled the camp with her husband. She was later caught and arrested by British troops.

Bösel, along with other female guards including Dorothea Binz, stood accused at the first Ravensbrück Trial, which occurred between December 1946 and February 1947 in Hamburg, Germany. The court found her guilty of maltreatment, murder, and taking part in the "selections". She was executed for her crimes at 9:55 am on 3 May 1947, 24 minutes after Elisabeth Marschall, by Albert Pierrepoint in Hamelin Prison.
