= Margarete Rabe =

Female Nazi concentration camp guard (born 1923)

- Born: 2 October 1923; Neustadt-Glewe, Germany
- Occupation: Guard at two concentration camps

Margarete Maria Rabe (born 2 October 1923) was a guard at two concentration camps from November 1944 until April 1945.

== Career in the Reich ==
In 1944, Rabe applied to the Neustadt camp office at Neustadt-Glewe to be a guard, and was stationed at Ravensbrück concentration camp on 7 November 1944. She immediately began mistreating the female prisoners there, and was infamous in the camp for her brutality. In late November or early December 1944, Rabe was one of several guards to be posted to the Uckermark camp under Ruth Closius. There the young SS Aufseherin helped select women and children for the gas chambers, and also took part in murders and torture (one survivor commented that the SS women in Uckermark were the most brutal of any in the Ravensbrück complex). In April 1945, Rabe fled the Uckermark camp.

At the third Ravensbrück Trial in April 1948, the British court handed her a sentence of life imprisonment. It was estimated that she had selected 3,000 female prisoners for the gas chamber and other execution methods. Rabe was released from prison on 26 February 1954, having served five years and ten months in confinement.
