= Ida Schreiter =

German concentration camp guard (1912–1948)

- Born: 12 December 1912; German Empire
- Died: 20 September 1948 (aged 35); Hamelin Prison, Allied-occupied Germany
- Occupation: Labour department warden
- Status: Executed by hanging
- Conviction: War crimes
- Trial: Hamburg Ravensbrück trials
- Penalty: Death

Ida Bertha Gertrud Schreiter (12 December 1912 – 20 September 1948) was from 1939 to 1945 an Aufseherin (labor department warden) in Ravensbrück concentration camp.

After the Second World War, Schreiter was brought to justice by the British occupation forces in Germany. She was accused of having taken part in the "selections" of prisoners who were subsequently murdered or died as a result of deliberate overwork or neglect. At the Seventh Ravensbrück Trial she was convicted of war crimes and sentenced to death. Schreiter was subsequently hanged on the gallows at Hamelin Prison by British executioner Albert Pierrepoint.
