= Dorothea Binz =

Nazi German officer and supervisor at Ravensbrück concentration camp (1920–1947)

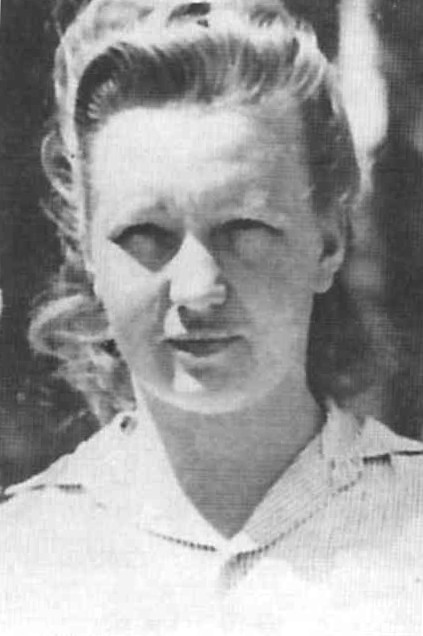
- Born: 16 March 1920; Försterei Dusterlake, Province of Brandenburg, Weimar Republic
- Died: 2 May 1947 (aged 27); Hamelin Prison, Allied-occupied Germany
- Occupation: Supervisor at Ravensbrück concentration camp
- Status: Executed by hanging
- Motive: Nazism; Sadism
- Conviction: War crimes
- Trial: Hamburg Ravensbrück trials
- Penalty: Death

Dorothea "Theodora" Binz (16 March 1920 – 2 May 1947) was a Nazi German officer and supervisor at Ravensbrück concentration camp during the Holocaust. She was known as one of the most brutal, ruthless, and sadistic overseers in the Nazi system. She was executed for war crimes on 2 May 1947.

== Early life ==
Born to a lower middle-class German family in Försterei Dusterlake, Brandenburg, Germany, Binz attended school until she was 15.

== Atrocities at Ravensbrück concentration camp ==
She volunteered for kitchen work at Ravensbrück in August 1939, when she was aged 19, and was given a position of Aufseherin (female overseer) the following month.

Binz served as an Aufseherin under Oberaufseherinnen Emma Zimmer, Johanna Langefeld, Maria Mandl, and Anna Klein. Though she worked under higher-ranking guards, Binz was known as "the true star of the camp", and the "chief guard was completely overshadowed by her deputy." She worked in various parts of the camp, including the kitchen and laundry. Later, she is said to have supervised the bunker where prisoners were tortured and killed. She began as deputy director of her penal block in September 1940, and became director of the cell block in the summer of 1942.

Binz was unofficially promoted to Stellvertretende Oberaufseherin (Deputy Chief Wardress) in July 1943; the promotion was made official in February 1944. Her abuse was later described as "unyielding". She was known to "watch for the weakest or most fearful prisoners, whom she would then shower with lashes or blows." As a member of the command staff between 1943 and 1945, she directed training and assigned duties to over 100 female guards at one time. Binz reportedly trained some of the cruellest female guards in the system, including Ruth Closius, and many conscripts who became guards testified after the war that they had been trained by her.

At Ravensbrück, the young Binz is said to have beaten, slapped, kicked, shot, whipped, stomped and sexually abused prisoners and set trained fighting dogs on them. Witnesses testified that when she appeared at the Appellplatz, "silence fell" as she instilled panic and fear. Any prisoners who dared to look at her risked having her select them to be killed in the gas chambers. She reportedly carried a whip in hand, along with a leashed German Shepherd, and without any provocation notice would kick prisoners to death. It was also believed that she hacked a prisoner to death with an axe during work detail.

Binz reportedly had a boyfriend in the camp, an SS officer, Edmund Bräuning. The couple reportedly went on romantic walks around the camp to watch prisoners being flogged, after which they would stroll away laughing. They lived together in a house outside the camp walls until late 1944, when Bräuning was transferred to Buchenwald concentration camp.

== Capture and execution ==
Binz fled Ravensbrück during the death march, but was captured on 3 May 1945 by the British in Hamburg, and incarcerated in the Recklinghausen camp (formerly a Buchenwald subcamp). She was tried for war crimes with other SS personnel by a British court in the Ravensbrück trial in 1947. Binz was found guilty and sentenced to death. Hours after her death sentence was confirmed in April 1947, she attempted to kill herself by slashing her wrists. However, officials intervened before she could bleed to death.

Binz was subsequently hanged at Hamelin Prison by British executioner Albert Pierrepoint on 2 May 1947. Her last words were to Pierrepoint, and she supposedly said to him: "I hope you will not think we are all evil people" just before her death.

== Sources ==
Information in this article comes from the following sources:

- Adele, Wendy & Sarti, Marie. Women and Nazis: Perpetrators of Genocide and Other Crimes During Hitler's Regime, 1933-1945. Academia Press, Palo Alto CA, 2011. ISBN 978-1936320
- Erpel, Simone. "Im Gefolge der SS": Aufseherinnen des Frauen-Konzentrationslagers Ravensbrück. Berlin, 2007.
