= Johann Schwarzhuber =

Nazi German SS-Obersturmführer

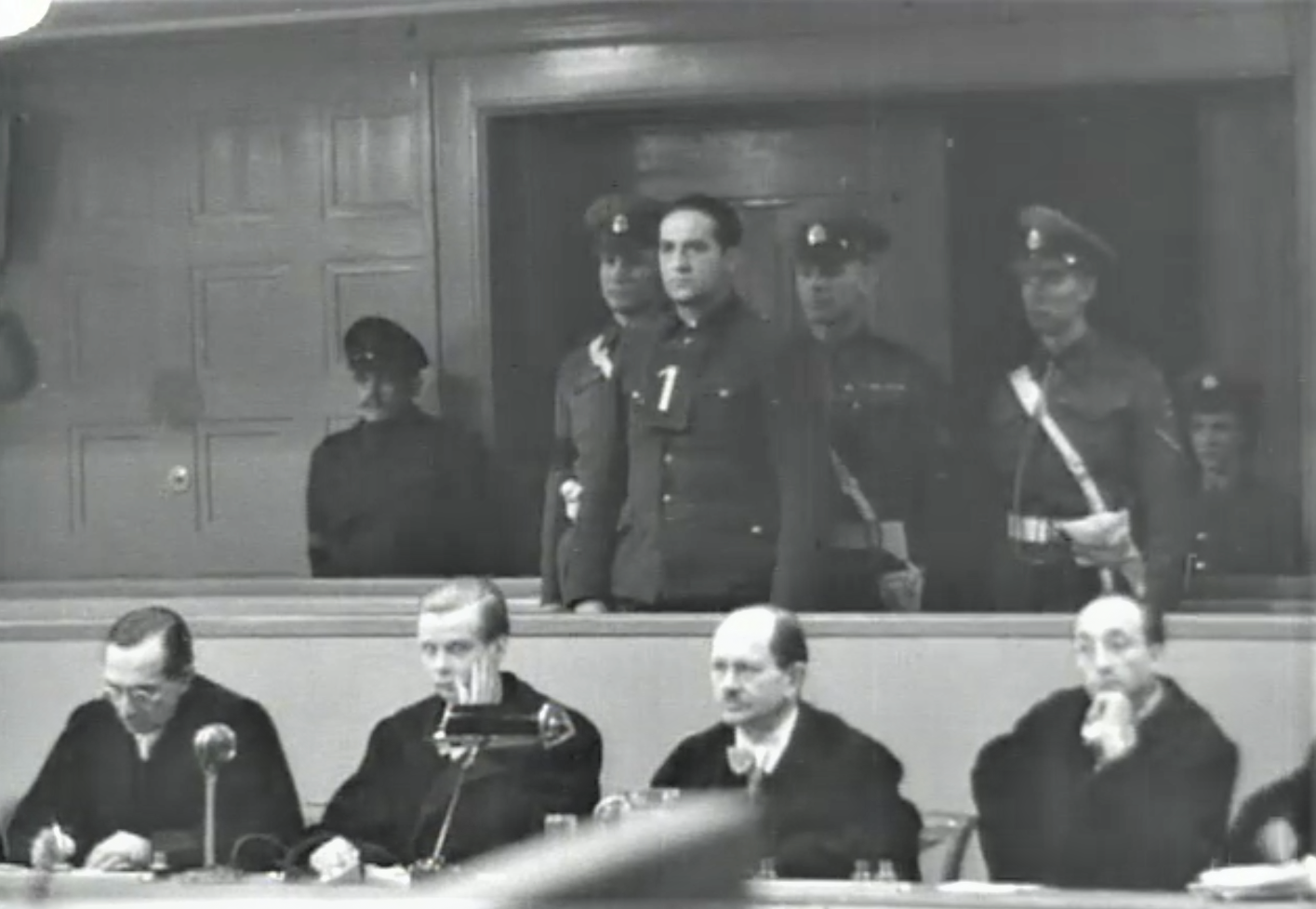
- Schwarzhuber listens to his death sentence being read out at the Ravensbrück trial
- Born: 29 August 1904; Tutzing, Kingdom of Bavaria, German Empire
- Died: 3 May 1947 (aged 42); Hamelin Prison, Allied-occupied Germany
- Status: Executed by hanging
- Conviction: War crimes
- Trial: Hamburg Ravensbrück trials
- Penalty: Death
- Military career
- Allegiance: Nazi Germany
- Branch: Schutzstaffel
- Rank: SS-Obersturmführer
- Commands: Auschwitz-Birkenau men's camp Ravensbrück concentration camp

Johann Schwarzhuber (29 August 1904 – 3 May 1947) was a Nazi German SS-Obersturmführer, who was in charge of various concentration subcamps during World War II. His positions included the Schutzhaftlagerführer of the Auschwitz-Birkenau men's camp, where he oversaw the selection process for the gassing of thousands of detainees. He was later transferred to the Ravensbrück concentration camp, where he held the post of the Lagerdirektor, second only to the overall camp commander Fritz Suhren. With Suhren on the run, Schwarzhuber was the highest-ranking defendant during the first Ravensbrück trial. In front of the British military tribunal he was indicted for war crimes for his role in the Holocaust, sentenced to death and subsequently executed in 1947.

== Early life and early Nazi activities ==
Schwarzhuber was born on 29 August 1904 in Tutzing, at this time part of the Kingdom of Bavaria in the German Empire. He trained as a printer and married his wife in 1936, with whom he fathered two children. As an early supporter during the rise of Nazism he joined the Nazi Party and the SS in 1933. By 1935 he was trained for the position as block leader in the Dachau concentration camp. At the outbreak of World War II he was transferred to the Sachsenhausen concentration camp, where he acted as commander of the Klinkerwerk sub-camp.

== Auschwitz ==
In September 1941 Schwarzhuber was again reassigned and moved to the Auschwitz-Birkenau concentration camp. As a Lagerführer, he was responsible for several inmate blocks and regularly mingled with the prisoners. He was regularly drunk at work and built up relationships with some of the Kapos. Nevertheless, he fulfilled his job dutifully as overseer of parts of the extermination camp. In November 1943 he was promoted to Schutzhaftlagerführer and took over the command of the Auschwitz men's camp. In this position he was also responsible for the selection process, which determined who was sent to the work camps and which prisoners were sent to the gas chambers. Thousands of inmates who were chosen by Schwarzhuber during this process were immediately killed. However, there were also a few instances of him pulling out non-eligible groups of inmates from the 'gas-queue' and 'protecting' them by putting them into the regular men's prison camp.

In November 1944 he returned to Dachau, now in charge of several sub-camps of the Kaufering concentration camp complex. This tenure did not last long, and he received his final deployment to the Ravensbrück concentration camp in January 1945.

== Ravensbrück and trial ==
In Ravensbrück, Schwarzhuber was directly responsible for the women's camp. With almost all of the Ravensbrück inmates being women, Schwarzhuber effectively commanded the entire complex, second only to overall camp leader Fritz Suhren. The camp was overcrowded; sanitation and food supply were insufficient. Many people froze to death due to a lack of clothing and heating. To combat the overcrowding, daily executions of about 50 inmates were ordered at the start of 1945. The killings were so cruel, that several camp deputies refused to oversee the murders until Schwarzhuber took over and the executions proceeded uneventfully. Ravensbrück was initially not intended to be an extermination camp, but during the last months of the war, deaths spiked massively. Thousands of women were killed in a newly built provisional gas chamber, coinciding with Schwarzhuber's arrival in the camp.

The Ravensbrück camp was captured by the British Army in April 1945 and Schwarzhuber was detained. The British launched a series of trials against the camp personnel starting in December 1945. With the main camp leader Fritz Suhren having fled, Schwarzhuber was the highest-ranking official indicted during the trial. He pleaded 'not guilty' and claimed to have attended only one mass execution in the camp, when 150 women were gassed at once in the chamber. It is not clear who gave the order to start mass executions in Ravensbrück—whether it was Suhren as overall commander or even Heinrich Himmler personally—but with Schwarzhuber in charge of the women's camp, significant responsibility nevertheless fell on him as deputy commander. Schwarzhuber was found guilty and subsequently sentenced to death. Although Schwarzhuber filed a petition for pardon, the execution was carried out on 3 May 1947.
