= Hamburg Ravensbrück trials =

War crime trials after World War II

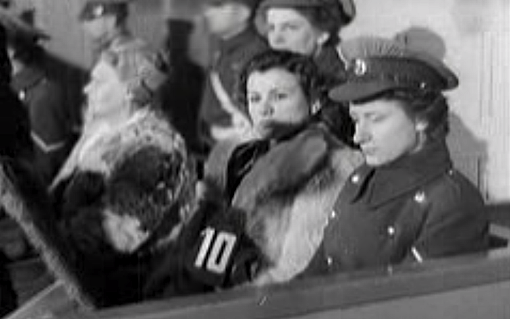
- In civilian clothing, Ravensbruck Aufseherinnen surrounded by uniformed Allied guards at trial, Hamburg 1947
- Court: Curiohaus, Hamburg, Germany
- Started: December 5, 1946 (Rotherbaum case); November 5, 1947 (Friedrich Opitz case); April 14, 1948 (Uckermark trial) and more
- Decided: July 21, 1948 (Rotherbaum case)

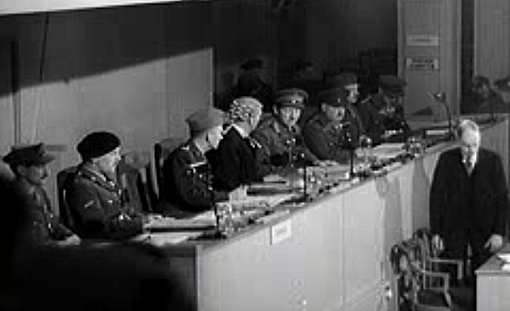
The first Ravensbrück trial, 1947. The sentencing, Hamburg, Rotherbaum

The Hamburg Ravensbrück trials were seven trials for war crimes during the Holocaust against camp officials from the Ravensbrück concentration camp that the British authorities held in their occupation zone in Germany in Hamburg after the end of World War II. These trials were heard before a military tribunal; the three to five judges at these trials were British officers, assisted by a lawyer. The defendants included concentration camp personnel of all levels: SS officers, camp doctors, male guards, female guards (Aufseherinnen), and a few former prisoner-functionaries who had tortured or mistreated other inmates. In total, 38 defendants were tried in these seven trials; 21 of the defendants were women. One of the defendants died during the trial. Twenty of the defendants received death sentences. One defendant was reprieved while two others committed suicide before they could be executed. The remaining 17 death sentences relating to these trials were carried out on the gallows at Hamelin Prison by British hangman Albert Pierrepoint.

All seven trials took place at the Curiohaus in the Hamburg quarter of Rotherbaum.

== First trial ==
The first Ravensbrück trial was held from December 5, 1946 until February 3, 1947, against 16 Ravensbrück concentration camp staff and officials. All of them were found guilty. One died during trial. The death sentences (except for Salvequart) were carried out on May 2 and 3, 1947.

#	Defendant	Function, Title	Sentence
1	Johann Schwarzhuber	Deputy camp leader	Death; executed on May 3, 1947
2	Gustav Binder	Warden	Death; executed on May 3, 1947
3	Heinrich Peters (SS member)	Warden	15 years imprisonment; released on May 22, 1954
4	Ludwig Ramdohr	Gestapo inspector	Death; executed on May 3, 1947
5	Martin Hellinger	Medical doctor	15 years imprisonment; released on May 20, 1954
6	Rolf Rosenthal	Medical doctor	Death; executed on May 3, 1947
7	Gerhard Schiedlausky	Medical doctor	Death; executed on May 3, 1947
8	Percival Treite	Medical doctor	Death; committed suicide on April 8, 1947, before the sentence could be carried out
9	Adolf Winkelmann	Medical doctor	Died during the trial on February 1, 1947
10	Dorothea Binz	Assistant Chief warden (Oberaufseherin)	Death; executed on May 2, 1947
11	Greta Bösel	Labor Department Head (Aufseherin)	Death; executed on May 3, 1947
12	Margarete Mewes	Jail warden	10 years imprisonment; released on February 26, 1952
13	Elisabeth Marschall	Nurse	Death; executed on May 3, 1947
14	Carmen Mory	Inmate; Kapo	Death; committed suicide on April 9, 1947, before the sentence could be carried out
15	Vera Salvequart	Inmate; Kapo	Death; executed on June 2, 1947
16	Eugenia von Skene	Inmate; Kapo	10 years imprisonment; released December 21, 1951

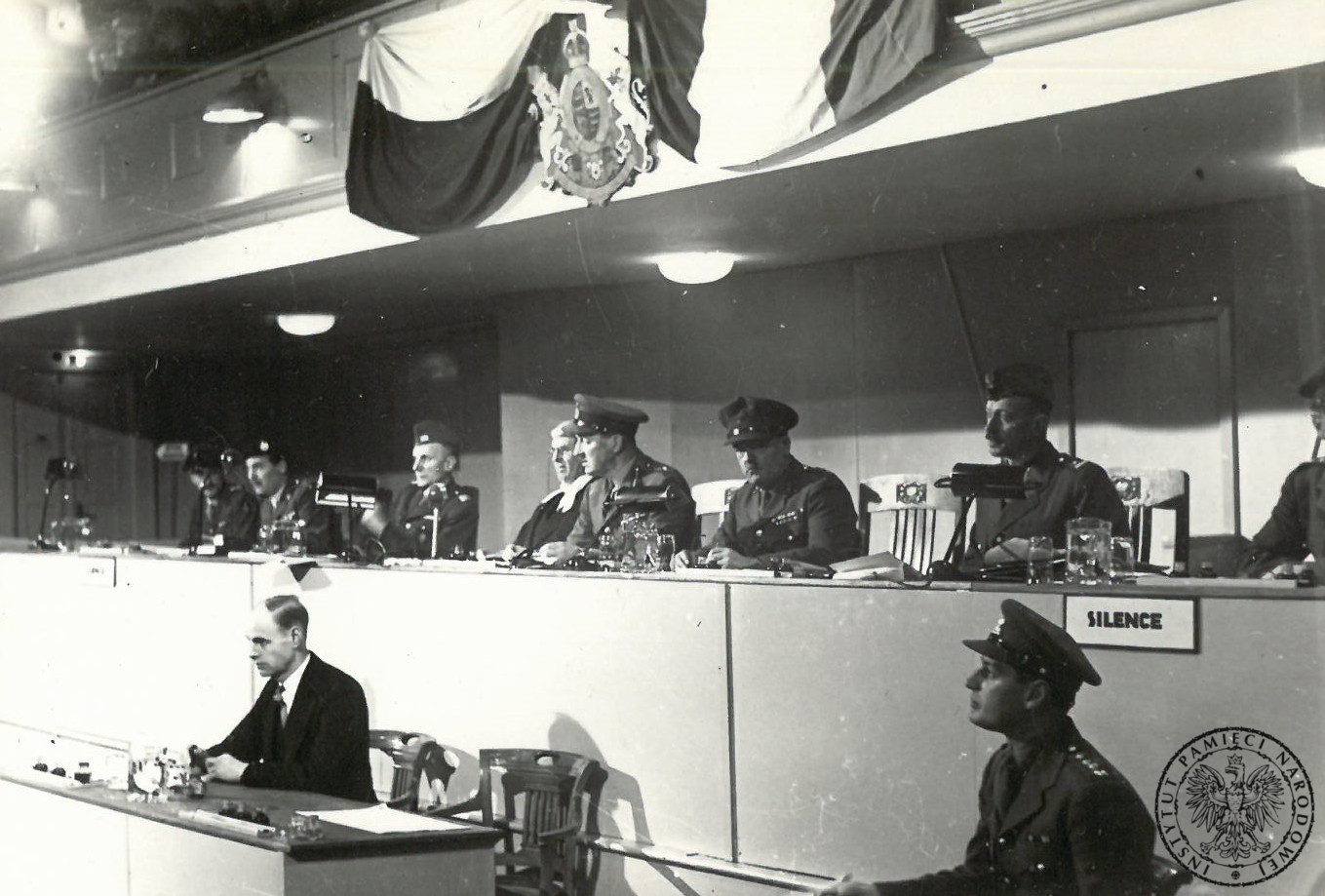
The trial judges of the KL Ravensbrück crew

Percival Treite, a half-British medical doctor at Ravensbrück, was defended by a dozen former female prisoners, including Special Operations Executive agent, Yvonne Baseden, who wrote letters to the court favorable to him. Ex-prisoner Mary Lindell testified in favor of Treite at the trial saying that Treite "was the only man who was human, the only man who looked after the sick people as a doctor should look after them." The outspoken Lindell also criticized the judge advocate, "who was partial and objectionable, had taken on the cross examination of witnesses himself and prevented other questions from being put which might have been [answered] in favour of the accused." Nevertheless, Triete was sentenced to death.

Three more defendants, the camp leader, Lagerkommandant Fritz Suhren, along with "work leader" Hans Pflaum and Schneidermeister Friedrich Opitz (below, see the Second Ravensbrück trial), escaped from prison prior to the first trial. The first two of them were apprehended under assumed names in 1949. They were handed over to French authorities, who were conducting another Ravensbrück trial in Rastatt at that time; both men were sentenced to death in that trial and executed by firing squad on June 12, 1950. Opitz faced trial in November 1947.

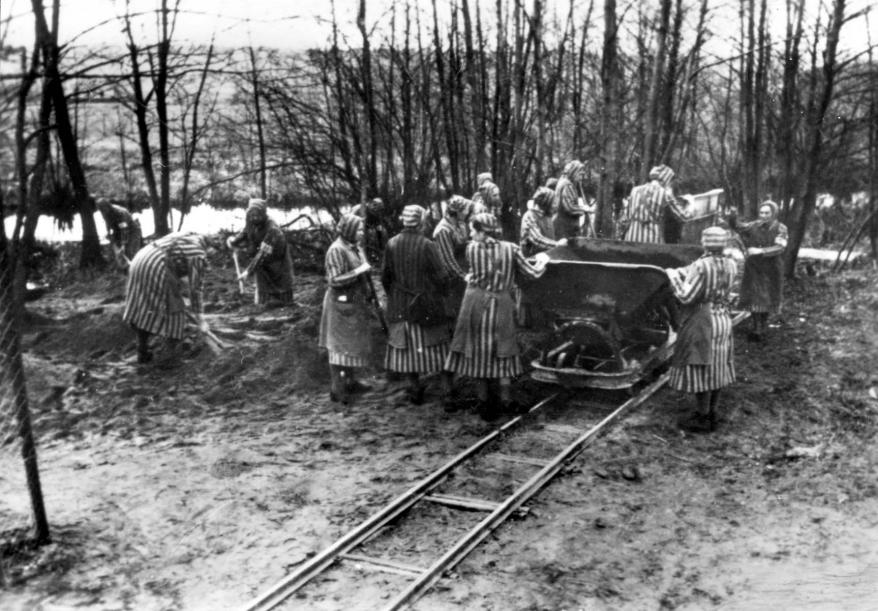
Female prisoners at Ravensbrück performing labor in 1939

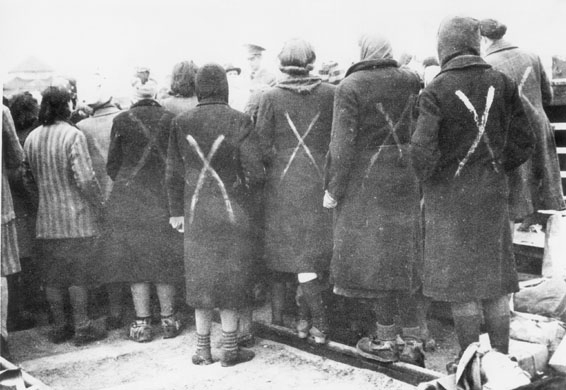
Female prisoners gathered when the Red Cross arrive to Ravensbrück in April 1945. The white paint marks shows they are prisoners.

== Second trial ==
In the second Ravensbrück trial, which lasted from November 5 to 27, 1947, the only defendant was Friedrich Opitz age 49, a clothing factory leader in the camp employed there from June 1940 till April 1945. He was recaptured after his earlier escape from prison along with Fritz Suhren and Hans Pflaum (see above). During trial, he was convicted of beating women with truncheons, belts and fists, starving them for missing the quota, keeping them outside in very long roll-calls, and sending them to the gas chamber for (what he called) "being useless", as well as of kicking at least one Czech female inmate, causing death. He also encouraged his guards to do the same. Opitz received a death sentence, which was carried out on January 26, 1948.

== Third trial ==
In the third Ravensbrück trial, the so-called "Uckermark trial" which took place from April 14 to 26, 1948, five female camp officials of the satellite Uckermark concentration camp, were indicted for the mistreatment of women and the participation in the selection of women for the gas chamber.

The Uckermark subcamp was located about one mile from the Ravensbrück concentration camp. It was opened in May 1942 as a prison or parallel concentration camp for teenage girls aged 16 to 21 dubbed criminal or "difficult" by the SS. Girls who reached the upper age limit were transferred back to the Ravensbrück women's camp. Camp administration was provided by the Ravensbrück main camp. In January 1945, the prison for juveniles was closed although the gassing infrastructure was subsequently used for the extermination of "sick, no longer efficient, and over 52 years old women" from Ravensbrück.

Defendant	Function, Title	Sentence
Johanna Braach	Criminal inspector; warden in the juvenile's camp	Acquitted
Lotte Toberentz	Camp leader of the juvenile's camp	Acquitted
Elfriede Mohneke	Assistant Chief warden of the extermination camp	10 years imprisonment; released on June 14, 1952
Margarete Rabe	Warden of the extermination camp	Life imprisonment; commuted to 21 years in 1950; released on February 26, 1954
Ruth Neudeck	Chief warden of the extermination camp	Death; executed on July 29, 1948

Braach and Toberentz were acquitted because they had worked at Uckermark only while it was still a juveniles camp, and there were no Allied women there at that time; the camp was exclusively for German girls, whose fate or treatment was outside the remit of the tribunal.

== Fourth trial ==
The fourth trial was held from May to June 8, 1948. The accused were all members of the medical staff of the camp at Ravensbrück, including one inmate who had worked as a nurse. The charges again centered on mistreatment, torture, and sending to gas chambers of women of Allied nationality.

Defendant	Function, Title	Sentence
Benno Orendi	Medical doctor	Death; executed on September 17, 1948
Walter Sonntag	Medical doctor	Death; executed on September 17, 1948
Martha Haake	Nurse	10 years imprisonment; released on January 1, 1951 for medical reasons
Liesbeth Krzok	Nurse	4 years imprisonment; released on February 3, 1951
Gerda Ganzer	Inmate; Nurse	Death; commuted to life imprisonment, then 21 years, then 12 years, released in 1955

== Fifth trial ==
In the fifth trial, three SS members were accused of having killed Allied inmates. It lasted from June 16 to 29, 1948. The judgments were handed down on July 15.

Defendant	Function, Title	Sentence
Arthur Conrad	SS warden	Death; executed on September 17, 1948
Heinrich Schäfer	SS warden	2 years imprisonment; released on October 28, 1949
Walter Schenk	SS warden	20 years imprisonment; released on August 3, 1954

== Sixth trial ==
This trial lasted from July 1 to 26, 1948. Both defendants were accused of having mistreated Allied inmates.

Defendant	Function, Title	Sentence
Kurt Lauer	SS warden	15 years imprisonment; released May 7, 1955
Kurt Rauxloh	SS warden	10 years imprisonment; released September 26, 1954 for medical reasons

== Seventh trial ==
Finally, six Aufseherinnen (female camp wardens) were tried from July 2 to 21, 1948. The charges were mistreatment of inmates of Allied nationality and participation in the selection of inmates for the gas chamber.

Defendant	Function, Title	Sentence
Luise Brunner	Chief warden (Oberaufseherin)	3 years imprisonment
Anna Friederike Mathilde Klein	Chief warden	Acquitted due to lack of evidence
Emma Zimmer	Assistant chief warden	Death; executed on September 20, 1948
Christine Holthöwer	Chief Warden of Siemens	Acquitted due to lack of evidence
Ida Schreiter	Labor Department Warden	Death; executed on September 20, 1948
Ilse Vettermann	Warden	12 years imprisonment

== See also ==
- Auschwitz trial held in Kraków, Poland in 1947 against 40 SS-staff of the Auschwitz concentration camp death factory
- Belsen trial
- Belzec trial before the 1st Munich District Court in the mid-1960s of the eight SS-men of the Belzec extermination camp command
- Chełmno trials of the Chełmno extermination camp personnel, held in Poland and in Germany. The cases were decided almost twenty years apart
- Dachau trials, held within the walls of the former Dachau concentration camp, 1945–1948
- Frankfurt Auschwitz trials running from December 20, 1963 to August 19, 1965
- Majdanek trials, the longest Nazi war crimes trial in history, spanning over 30 years
- Mauthausen-Gusen camp trials
- Nuremberg trials of the 24 most important leaders of the Third Reich, 1945–1946
- Sobibor trial, held in Hagen, Germany in 1965, concerning the Sobibor extermination camp officials
- Stutthof trials
- Treblinka trials in Düsseldorf, Germany

== Literature ==
- Taake, C.: Angeklagt: SS-Frauen vor Gericht; Bibliotheks- und Informationssystem der Univ. Oldenburg, 1998. In German.
- G. Álvarez, Mónica. "Guardianas Nazis. El lado femenino del mal" (Spanish). Madrid: Grupo Edaf, 2012. ISBN 978-84-414-3240-6
