= Luise Brunner =

German concentration camp guard in Auschwitz (1908–1977)

- Born: August 25, 1908; Aidhausen, Germany
- Died: December 8, 1977; Roth (district), Germany
- Occupation: Concentration camp guard
- Known for: Chief oberaufseherin of Ravensbrück concentration camp

Luise Brunner (25 August 1908 – 8 December 1977) was a German concentration camp guard in Auschwitz II (1942 – late 1944) and the chief oberaufseherin (chief guard) of Ravensbrück concentration camp from December 1944 to April 1945.

== Biography ==
Brunner was born in Aidhausen in 1908. She trained at the Ravensbruck concentration camp during June 1942, and in October of that year she was assigned to Auschwitz-Birkenau, where she rose through the ranks to become a Kommandoführerin. At Birkenau, Brunner was feared for her brutality: "A female German teacher – Drechsler – was the Lagerführerin [Stellvertretende Lagerführerin], a German woman named Brunner was the Oberapportführerin and another one called Grese was the Rapportführerin. If they noticed a shawl, a pullover, or stocking they would beat you half-dead."

During the Seventh Ravensbrück Trial (2 July 1948 – 21 July 1948), Brunner was tried on charges of mistreatment of inmates of Allied nationality and participation in the selection of inmates for the gas chamber. She was sentenced to 3 years imprisonment.
