= Anna Klein (camp warden) =

German Nazi concentration camp guard and chief warden

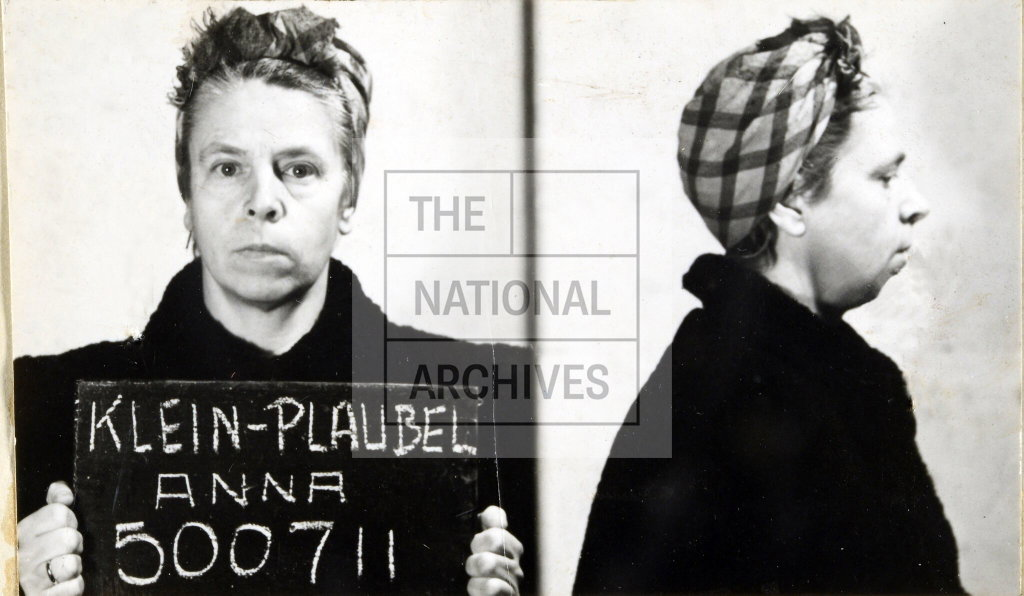
- Anna Klein-Plaubel, Chief female overseer (Chef Oberaufseherin) of Ravensbrück concentration camp, in custody, with identification board 500711.
- Born: Anna Friederike Mathilde Plaubel; 4 March 1900; Frankfurt am Main, German Empire
- Died: 8 February 1990 (aged 89); Frankfurt am Main, West Germany
- Occupation: Concentration camp guard
- Years active: 1939 – 1945
- Known for: Chief warden at the Ravensbrück concentration camp

Anna Friederike Mathilde Klein (née Plaubel; sometimes referred to as Anna Klein-Plaubel; 4 March 1900 – 8 February 1990) was a Nazi German concentration camp guard and chief warden at the Ravensbrück concentration camp. She was tried for her role in the Holocaust, but acquitted due to lack of evidence.

== Atrocities in Nazi concentration camps ==
On 14 September 1939, she arrived in Ravensbrück. In August 1943, she was promoted to the highest rank of Chef Oberaufseherin (Chief senior supervisor), with control and the responsibility of monitoring all of Ravensbrück camp, including slave labor, medical experiments, and death of inmates, the majority of whom were female political prisoners.

Klein reached the highest rank that the Nazis allowed a woman in a camp; she received a higher salary, better housing, better food (which was not cooked by detainees, but by other Schutzstaffel (SS) women), the best clothes, more power, and this hierarchical title of honour. She oversaw all guards at Ravensbrück until the SS assigned her to the Sachsenhausen concentration camp in September 1944. There, she served as a supervisor, with the same rank until the liberation of the camp by the Allies in April 1945.

== Trial and acquittal ==
For the period of August 1943 to August 1944, in Ravensbrück, Klein was charged with mistreatment of inmates and participation in the selection of inmates for the gas chamber in the seventh Ravensbrück Trial in Hamburg. This trial lasted from 2 July to 21 July 1948. She was acquitted on 21 July 1948 due to lack of evidence.

== Sources ==
- Álvarez, Mónica G (2012). Guardianas Nazis. El lado femenino del mal (in Spanish). Madrid: Grupo Edaf. ISBN 978-84-414-3240-6.
- Aroneanu, Eugene, ed. (1996). Inside the Concentration Camps. Trans. Thomas Whissen. New York: Praeger. ISBN 9780275954468.
- Brown, Daniel Patrick (2002). The Camp Women. The Female Auxiliaries Who Assisted the SS in Running the Nazi Concentration Camp System. Atglen, Pa: Schiffer Publishing. ISBN 0-7643-1444-0.
- Hart, Kitty (1983). Return to Auschwitz: The Remarkable Story of a Girl Who Survived the Holocaust. New York: Atheneum. ISBN 9780689706370.
