= Arthur Gerlt =

Arthur Erich Richard Gerlt (13 May 1903 – 17 February 1996) was a German resistance fighter and mayor of Bemerode, which later became a district of Hanover, Germany.

== Life ==
Arthur Gerlt worked as a metalworker at the Wülfel Ironworks (Eisenwerk Wülfel) in Hanover. Following the Nazi seizure of power in 1933, he joined the resistance group Committee for Proletarian Unity (Komitee für Proletarische Einheit), led by Eduard Wald. In 1935, Gerlt was arrested on charges of “preparation to commit high treason.” He subsequently spent 13 months in pretrial detention before being sentenced to two years and ten months in prison. He served his sentence alongside other political prisoners at Hamelin Prison.

After Hanover was liberated by American troops on 10 April 1945, two members of the Social Democratic Party of Germany appealed to the British military authorities on Gerlt's behalf. As a result, on 1 July 1945, he was appointed mayor of Bemerode, replacing the incumbent Nazi Party mayor (NSDAP).

Following Bemerode's first municipal elections after the Second World War, Arthur Gerlt was elected municipal director (Gemeindedirektor). At the time, Bemerode was a village of approximately 900 inhabitants, yet it was required to accommodate and feed 750 refugees. Some were housed in a refugee camp, while others were placed in the homes of existing residents, and not all long-established inhabitants were willing to accept the newcomers. The compulsory requisitioning of available living space therefore did not proceed smoothly. Some residents reportedly attempted to avoid having their homes requisitioned through various tricks and evasions, creating considerable tensions. Furthermore, local farmers were required to organise food supplies for the refugees, something they were not always willing to do.

Gerlt was not reconfirmed in his position by the municipal council at the end of 1947, and following that he moved to Bad Essen, where he became director of a convalescent home for victims of Nazi persecution.

== Commemoration ==
Approximately a decade after Arthur Gerlt's death in 1996, his great-granddaughter, Katharina Langfeldt, researched and documented the history of her great-grandfather's life. In recognition of her work, she received an award from German Federal President Horst Köhler in 2007.

Following this, Klaus Kaiser, then an SPD representative on the district council, initiated a proposal to name a street after the former mayor of Bemerode. On 20 June 2012, District Mayor Bernd Rödel and Katharina Langfeldt jointly unveiled the street sign for Arthur-Gerlt-Weg, in the presence of other family members. The sign was installed on a lamppost beside the sign for Friedrich-Wulfert-Platz in Bemerode. The location was particularly appropriate because Friedrich Wulfert, like Gerlt, had worked at the Wülfel Ironworks, participated in resistance against the Nazi regime, and consequently been sentenced to imprisonment.

During the ceremony, Bernd Rödel stated:

“Remembering the past also means remembering those people who acted against the Nazi dictatorship on a small scale and largely out of sight. This is particularly important given that they were subjected to physical and psychological abuse—including confinement in darkness and solitary isolation—experiences that left deep and lifelong scars.”
