= Elisabeth Marschall =

German nurse (1886–1947)

- Born: May 27, 1886; German Empire
- Died: May 3, 1947 (aged 60); Hamelin Prison, Allied-occupied Germany
- Occupation: Nurse
- Status: Executed by hanging
- Motive: Nazism
- Conviction: War crimes
- Trial: Hamburg Ravensbrück trials
- Penalty: Death

Elisabeth Marschall (May 27, 1886 – May 3, 1947) was the head nurse (Oberschwester) at the Nazi Ravensbrück concentration camp and was executed after the Hamburg Ravensbrück trials.

== Early life ==
Marschall was born in 1886 and received her nursing education in Meiningen, passing the state exam in 1910. She joined the Nazi party because "Hitler could save Germany from its misery".

== Camp career ==
Marschall worked as Oberschwester at Ravensbrück concentration camp from April 1943 until the camps liberation, where her duties included selecting prisoners for execution, overseeing medical experiments, and selecting around 800 prisoners to be shipped to Auschwitz. She worked with Adolf Winkelmann and Percival Treite, assisting in torture of prisoners and providing postoperative care to the subjects of their experimental operations.

A survivor who worked as a prisoner-nurse testified that Marschall had loaded a group of 50 women with new-born infants onto a cart and did not provide them with food, milk or water. All of the prisoners passed away. Another witness testified that "I have seen schwester (nurse) Lisa beating sick women without any reason at all."

Mil Le Coq, a French trained nurse, reported an incident with Marschall, recounted in The Scourge of the Swastika: A Short History of Nazi War Crimes:

She "passed through the hospital courtyard one day on her way to the laboratory and saw five wheelbarrows containing ... five Jewesses - the triangle on their dresses indicated that... Mil Le Coq went to the barrows and touched the bodies to see if whether they were alive and if anything could be done for them. They were alive. At that moment Marschall came on to the scene and, shouting across the yard, forbade the French girl to do anything to help the women. She returned to her block and bought two friends ... but Marshcall appeared and drove them away. The barrows remained there all night and by the morning the three survivors were dead."

== Trial ==
Marschall was arrested when the camp was liberated. At the Hamburg Ravensbrück trials, she was found guilty and sentenced to death. On 2 May 1947, she was hanged by British executioner Albert Pierrepoint on the gallows in Hamelin Prison. Nearly 61 when she died, Marschall was the oldest female Nazi war criminal to be executed by the British occupation authorities.

== Sources ==
- Patricia O'Brien D'Antonio, Barbra Mann Wall (2002). Nursing History Review. Springer Publishing Company. ISBN 0-8261-1478-4.
