= Ruth Neudeck =

SS supervisor (1920–1948)

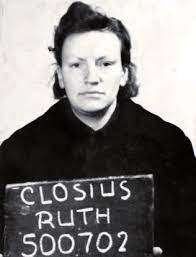
- Born: Ruth Closius; 5 July 1920; Breslau, Weimar Republic (present day Wrocław, Poland)
- Died: 29 July 1948 (aged 28); Hamelin Prison, Allied-occupied Germany
- Status: Executed by hanging
- Conviction: War crimes
- Trial: Hamburg Ravensbrück trials
- Penalty: Death
- Military career
- Allegiance: Nazi Germany
- Branch: Schutzstaffel
- Service years: 1944 — 1945
- Rank: Blockführerin (Barrack Overseer)

Ruth Closius-Neudeck (5 July 1920 – 29 July 1948) was a Nazi Schutzstaffel (SS) supervisor at a Nazi concentration camp complex from December 1944 until March 1945. She was executed for war crimes for her role in the Holocaust.

== Early life ==
Ruth Closius was born in Breslau, Germany (now Wrocław, Poland). She hoped to become a nurse, but worked as a saleswoman in a textiles warehouse. She later married and was known as Ruth Neudeck or Ruth Closius-Neudeck.

== Atrocities in Nazi concentration camps ==
In July 1944, she arrived at the Ravensbrück concentration camp to begin her training to be a camp guard. Neudeck soon began impressing her superiors with her unbending brutality towards the female prisoners, resulting in her promotion to the rank of Blockführerin (Barrack Overseer) in late July 1944.

In the Ravensbrück camp, she was known as one of the most ruthless female guards. Former French prisoner Geneviève de Gaulle-Anthonioz commented after the war that she had seen Neudeck "cut the throat of an inmate with the sharp edge of her shovel". Another survivor testified that Neudeck "took off the clothes of some inmates, poured cold water over them and made them stand in the cold for hours."

In December 1944, Neudeck was promoted to the rank of Oberaufseherin, and moved to the Uckermark extermination complex subcamp close to Ravensbrück. There she was involved in the selection and execution of over 5,000 women and children and running of the gas chambers. The prisoners were mistreated by Neudeck or her fellow SS Aufseherinnen. In March 1945, Neudeck became head of the Barth subcamp.

== Capture, trial and execution ==
In late April 1945, she fled the camp but was later captured and detained in prison while the British Army investigated the allegations against her. From 26 April 1948, she stood accused at the third Ravensbrück trial, along with other Schutzstaffel (SS) women. The 28-year-old former SS supervisor admitted to the accusations of murder and maltreatment made against her.

The British court found Neudeck guilty of war crimes and sentenced her to death by hanging. On 29 July 1948, she was executed by British executioner Albert Pierrepoint on the gallows at Hamelin Prison.

== See also ==
- Female guards in Nazi concentration camps

== Sources ==
- Daniel Patrick Brown (2002). The Camp Women: The Female Auxiliaries Who Assisted the SS in Running the Concentration Camp System. Schiffer Military History. Schiffer Publishing Limited.
