= Fritz Suhren =

Nazi German SS officer (1908–1950)

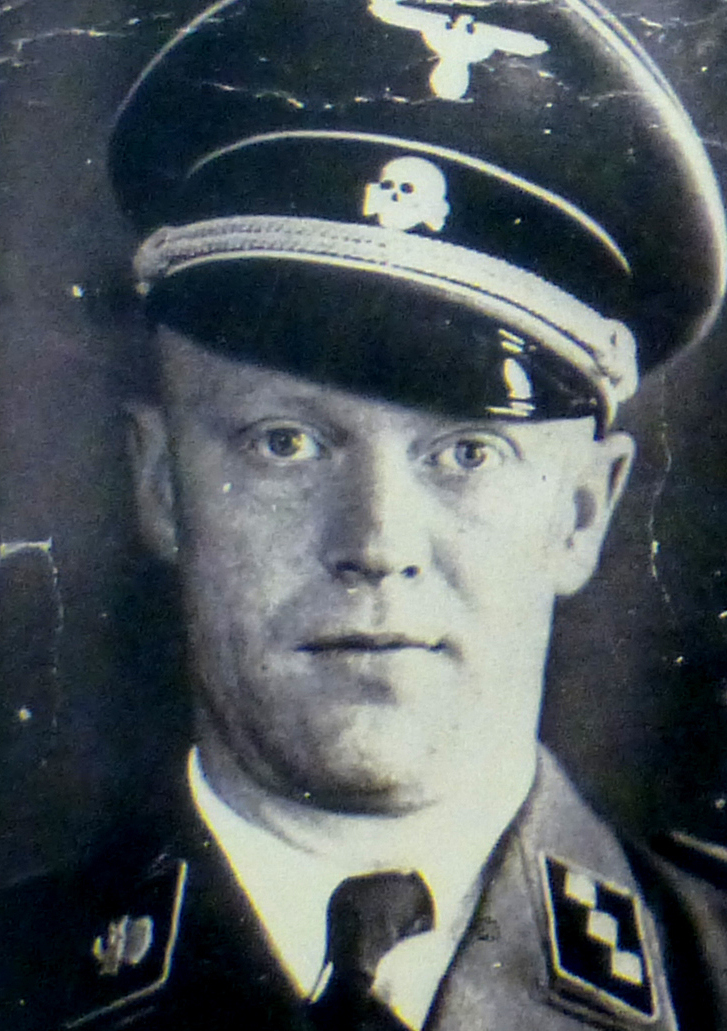
- Born: 10 June 1908; Varel, Grand Duchy of Oldenburg, German Empire
- Died: 12 June 1950 (aged 42) Baden-Baden, Baden-Württemberg, West Germany
- Cause of death: Execution by firing squad
- Allegiance: Nazi Germany
- Branch: Schutzstaffel
- Service years: 1931–1945
- Rank: SS-Sturmbannführer
- Commands: Ravensbrück concentration camp

Fritz Suhren (10 June 1908 – 12 June 1950) was a Nazi German SS officer and Nazi concentration camp commandant. In 1950 he was tried for his role in The Holocaust by a French military court, found guilty of war crimes and crimes against humanity, and executed.

== Nazi party membership ==
Suhren joined the Nazi Party in 1928 and the Sturmabteilung (SA) at the same time. He moved over to the SS in October 1931, initially as a volunteer before going full-time in 1934.

== Sachsenhausen concentration camp ==
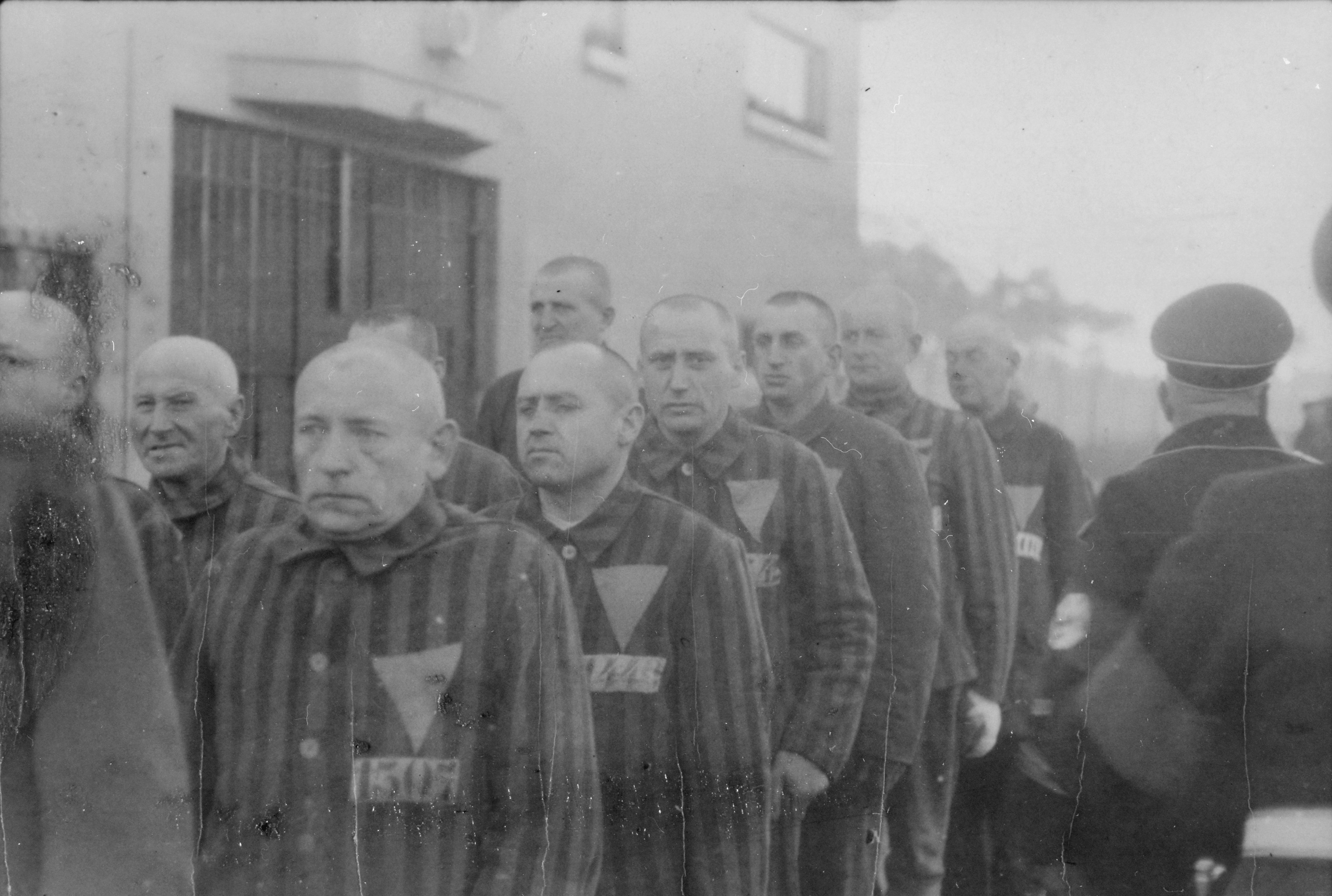
Prisoners of Sachsenhausen, 19 December 1938

Trained by the Wehrmacht under SS supervision, Suhren was nevertheless not used as a soldier, and instead was stationed at Sachsenhausen concentration camp in 1941. By 1942 he was Lagerführer (deputy commandant) at the camp, and in May of that year ordered camp Lagerältester Harry Naujoks to hang a prisoner who had been earmarked for execution. Naujoks refused to perform the deed. While Naujoks was able to survive the insubordination, Suhren insisted that he stand beside the prisoner on the gallows (which had been fitted with a winch in order to prolong the execution), and forced a young inmate to perform the hanging.

== Ravensbrück concentration camp ==
Suhren was commandant of the women's camp at Ravensbrück concentration camp. His policy upon taking command in 1942 was to exterminate the prisoners through working them as hard as possible while feeding them the least amount of food he could.

As commandant at Ravensbrück, Suhren had to provide inmates to Dr. Karl Gebhardt for experimentation. Suhren initially objected to this, mainly because most of the inmates at the camp were political prisoners, and he complained to the Reich Security Main Office (RSHA) about the practice. However, the SS command overruled Suhren's doubts and he was forced to apologise to Gebhardt and supply him with the prisoners he demanded. Suhren later said he witnessed experiments that included exposing women to high levels of X-rays in order to accomplish sterilisation.

Near the end of World War II, Franz Göring (SS member) and Benoit Musy approached Suhren to ask him to allow a convoy of women to leave the camp and go into the custody of the Scandinavian Red Cross. Suhren refused the request as it was against superior orders, although eventually Göring got the backing of Rudolf Brandt and Suhren was forced to yield.

== Surrender, trial and execution ==
With the Allies just a few miles from the camp, Suhren took Odette Sansom, an inmate at Ravensbruck whom he believed to be Winston Churchill's niece due in part to her using the assumed surname of Churchill in the camp, and drove with her to the United States base, hoping that her presence would save him. Sansom had in fact been instructed to adopt the false name and to encourage the presumption of her relationship to the British Prime Minister, as she was a spy in the camp. The British felt that if the Germans thought she was Churchill's relative, they would want to keep her alive as a possible bargaining tool. Suhren was arrested and detained by the British.

In 1946, Suhren and another man, Hans Pflaum, escaped prison and fled to Bavaria. As a result, they did not attend the Hamburg Ravensbrück trials in 1947. However, in 1949, the two men were recaptured by U.S. soldiers, who extradited them to the French occupation zone. Suhren and Pflaum were both put on trial by a French military court. The trial and appeal took place from February to May 1950. The jury was composed of representatives from the French, Dutch and Luxembourg governments, presided by the chief justice officer of the French zone. Several dozen former prisoners were subpoenaed. Suhren and Pflaum were found guilty of war crimes and crimes against humanity, sentenced to death, and executed on 12 June 1950.

== See also ==
- Marie-José Chombart de Lauwe (born 1923), French resistance fighter and sociologist

Military offices
Preceded by SS-Hauptsturmführer Max Koegel	Commandant of Ravensbrück concentration camp August 1942 – April 1945	Succeeded by camp liberated
