= Walter Sonntag =

Nazi German physician (1907–1948)

Walter Sonntag (13 May 1907 – 17 September 1948) was a Nazi medical doctor who performed experiments on concentration camp victims. He extracted their healthy teeth without the use of anaesthetic and his preferred method of killing was by injecting petrol and phenol directly into their veins. He experimented with the prostitutes interned in Ravensbrück concentration camp, using them as his “lab rats” in search for a cure for gonorrhoea and syphilis. He was convicted of war crimes at the Hamburg Ravensbruck trials and executed on 17 September 1948 in Hamelin.
