= Hamelin Prison =

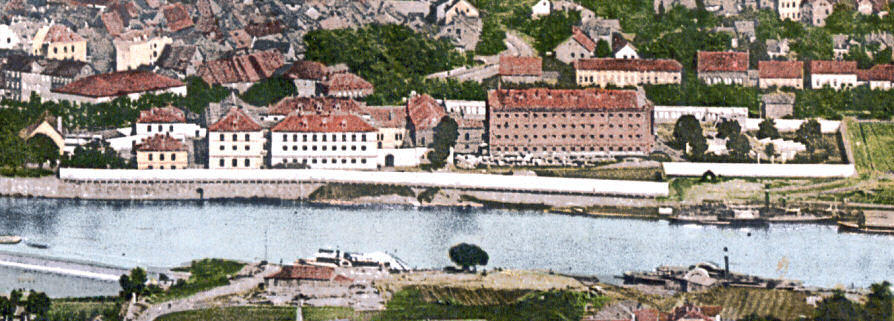
- View of the prison complex on the Weser from Klüt hill around 1900
- Interactive map of Hamelin Prison
- 52°06′02.7″N 09°21′09″E

Hamelin Prison, also known as the Stockhof, was a prison and penitentiary in Hamelin, Germany. The penal institution, which had a predecessor since 1698, existed from 1827 to 1980. It was located between the old town and the river Weser. After the Second World War, it was the site of executions carried out by the occupying British forces.

The listed prison buildings are now used as a hotel.

== History ==
The penal institution dates back to the Stockhof built in 1698, which housed prisoners condemned to build a fortress. The name came from the fact that the prisoners were tied to stocks in their dormitory at night to prevent escapes.

A new prison was built in 1713 because of overcrowding. In 1827, a new building was built on the former site of the Hamelin Fortress directly on the Weser, from which some of the remaining remains of the building originate. There were three wings and outbuildings. This was the Royal Penitentiary, which became a Prussian prison in 1866.

=== Nazi period ===
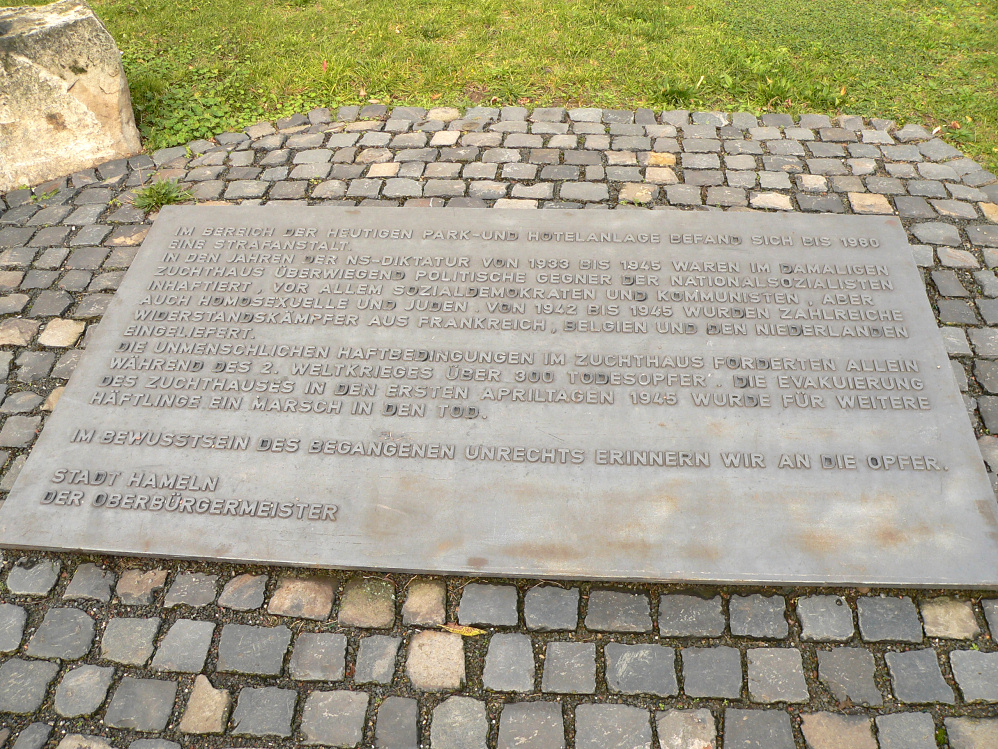
Plaque in front of the prison

From 1933, during the Nazi period, hundreds of political prisoners were imprisoned, in addition to around 500 criminal prisoners. According to the National Socialist rulers, it was primarily communists and social democrats, but also homosexuals and the Jews. In 1935, the outer walls were raised, and the institution was converted into a penitentiary. During the Second World War, political prisoners from France and Denmark were added, also as Nacht-und-Nebel prisoners. According to official statistics, 305 prisoners died between 1939 and 1945, 55 of them after their liberation by American troops. At the end of the war, on April 5, 1945, while the city was being shelled, the SS ordered the prison to be evacuated and the camp to be walked to the Holzen subcamp, which became a death march along the Ith for many prisoners.

=== Post-war period ===
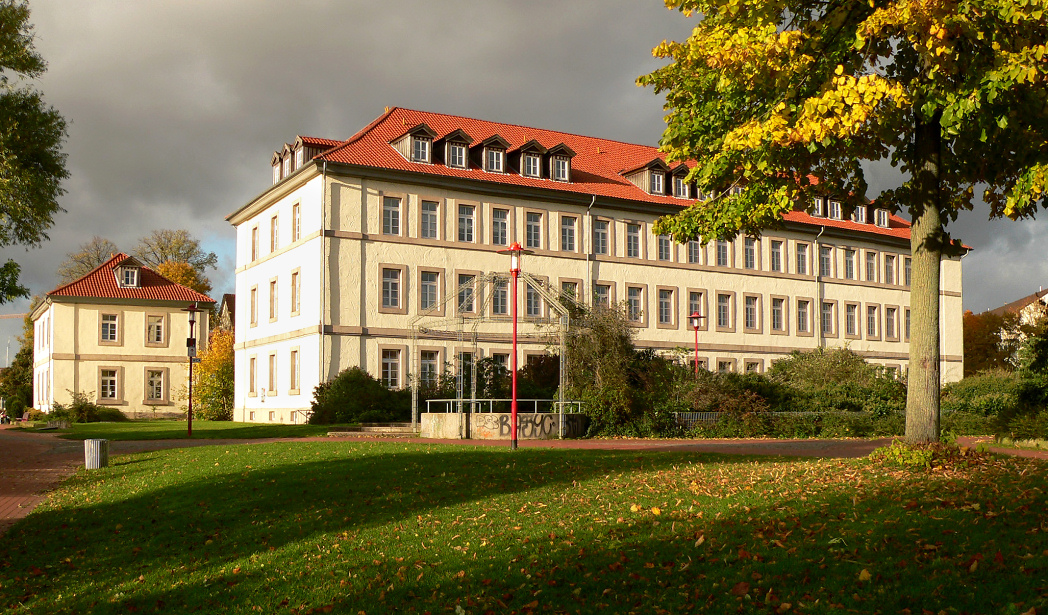
Buildings of the prison today

In the post-war period, the prison was used by the British military government as a place of execution from 13 December 1945 until 1949, British executioner Albert Pierrepoint executed 156 Nazi war criminals during this period. Among them were the concentration camp guards Irma Grese, Elisabeth Volkenrath and Johanna Bormann, who were convicted in the Belsen trial, the camp commander Josef Kramer, and the concentration camp doctor Fritz Klein. Other executions due to Allied trials involved the concentration camp doctor Rolf Rosenthal, Hans Körbel and Benno Orendi, Vera Salvequart, the SS guards Ruth Neudeck, Dorothea Binz, Elisabeth Marschall and Emma Zimmer, the former battalion commander of the 12th SS Panzer Division Bernhard Siebken, and Fritz Knöchlein, chief of the 4th Company of the 2nd SS Totenkopf Regiment.

Another 44 people were executed for violating the laws of occupation. Among them were 42 former forced labourers, some of whom were from Eastern Europe. The last execution in Hamelin was on December 6, 1949, on the Pole Jerzy Andziak (a displaced person) for the use of firearms resulting in death.

In 1955, Hamelin Prison was closed and the inmates were transferred to the Justizvollzugsanstalt Celle. On October 1, 1958, the prison became a juvenile detention centre, whose prisoners were transferred to the newly established Hameln juvenile detention centre in Tündern in 1980. This ended the prison operations. In 1986, the cell building, east, and west wings of the facility were demolished. The remaining parts were converted into a hotel, which opened in August 1993.

== Political prisoners during the National Socialist period ==
- Emil Carlebach, Jewish trade unionist
- Arthur Gerlt, member of the Committee for Proletarian Unity
- Wilhelm Hahn jr, Social Democrat and resistance fighter

- Walter Kramer, communist
- Friedrich Lohmeyer, SPD functionary and resistance fighter
- Wilhelm Muller, communist
- Karl Schinke, Social Democrat
- Peter Schneider, Social Democrat
- Ernst Wesemann, Social Democrat

== Executed under British occupation ==
This is a partial list of executions at Hamelin Prison during British occupation.

Name	Description	Execution date
Dorothea Binz	concentration camp guard	2 May 1947
Johanna Bormann	concentration camp guard	13 December 1945
Irma Grese	concentration camp guard	13 December 1945
Franz Hößler	SS-Hauptsturmführer and detention camp leader	13 December 1945
Fritz Hollborn	SS-Obersturmführer, Gestapo chief in Hagen	23 January 1947
Gustav Alfred Jepsen	SS-Unterscharführer, deputy leader of the Wilhelmshaven subcamp of Neuengamme and officer during the Lüneburg massacre	26 June 1947
Fritz Klein	concentration camp doctor	13 December 1945
Fritz Knöchlein	SS-Obersturmführer	21 January 1949
Hans Körbel	SS doctor, works doctor at Volkswagen	7 March 1947
Josef Kramer	concentration camp commander	13 December 1945
Günther Kuhl	SS-Obersturmbannführer	9 December 1948
Max Pauly	concentration camp commander	8 October 1946
Rolf Rosenthal	SS doctor at Ravensbrück concentration camp	3 May 1947
Karl Eberhard Schöngarth	SS-Brigadeführer	16 May 1946
Bernhard Siebken	SS-Obersturmbannführer	20 January 1949
Walter Sonntag	SS-Hauptsturmführer, concentration camp dentist	17 September 1948
Bruno Tesch	chemist and co-inventor of Zyklon B	16 May 1946
Karl Weinbacher	deputy executive of Bruno Tesch	16 May 1946
Anton Thumann	SS-Obersturmführer	8 October 1946
Elisabeth Volkenrath	concentration camp guard	13 December 1945
Johann Frahm	SS-Unterscharführer at Neuengamme concentration camp	11 October 1946
Wilhelm Dörr		13 December 1945
Karl Francioh		13 December 1945
Ansgar Pichen		13 December 1945
Franz Stofel	SS-Hauptscharführer and camp commander	13 December 1945
Peter Weingärtner		13 December 1945
Eduard Geith	Convicted of murdering the Stalag Luft III escapees	27 February 1948
Josef Gmeiner	Convicted of murdering the Stalag Luft III escapees	27 February 1948
Walter Herberg	Convicted of murdering the Stalag Luft III escapees	27 February 1948
Walter Jacobs	Convicted of murdering the Stalag Luft III escapees	27 February 1948
Hans Kähler	Convicted of murdering the Stalag Luft III escapees	27 February 1948
Johannes Post	Convicted of murdering the Stalag Luft III escapees	27 February 1948
Otto Preiss	Convicted of murdering the Stalag Luft III escapees	27 February 1948
Alfred Schimmel	Convicted of murdering the Stalag Luft III escapees	27 February 1948
Oskar Schmidt	Convicted of murdering the Stalag Luft III escapees	27 February 1948
Johann Schneider	Convicted of murdering the Stalag Luft III escapees	27 February 1948
Emil Schulz	Convicted of murdering the Stalag Luft III escapees	27 February 1948
Emil Weil	Convicted of murdering the Stalag Luft III escapees	27 February 1948
Erich Zacharias	Convicted of murdering the Stalag Luft III escapees	27 February 1948
