= Uckermark concentration camp =

Concentration camp in Germany

Coordinates: 53°11′16″N 13°10′50″E

The Uckermark concentration camp was a small German concentration camp for young women near the Ravensbrück concentration camp in Fürstenberg/Havel, Germany and then an "emergency" extermination camp.

== Overview ==
The camp was opened in May 1942 as a detention camp for girls, aged 16 to 21, who were considered criminal or difficult. Girls who reached the upper age limit were transferred to the Ravensbrück women's camp. Camp administration was provided by the Ravensbrück camp. In its early years, the head overseer at Uckermark was a woman named Lotte Toberentz, and one other Aufseherin (female warden) is known today by the name of Johanna Braach. Both of these women were tried by a British court at the Third Ravensbrück trial.

In January 1945, the juveniles' camp was closed and the infrastructure was subsequently used as an extermination camp for "women who were sick, no longer efficient, and over 52 years old". Over 5,000 women were murdered there; only 500 women and children survived. Though it was shut down in March 1945, the Soviets liberated the camp on the night of April 29–30, 1945. Today, only very few structures of the camp lie in ruins, barely recognizable.

Some of the responsible SS wardens of the camp, amongst them chief warden (Oberaufseherin) Ruth Neudeck, were tried in the Third Ravensbrück Trial, called the "Uckermark trial".

== See also ==
- German Resistance to Nazism
- Glossary of Nazi Germany
- The Holocaust
- List of books about Nazi Germany
- List of concentration and internment camps
- List of Nazi-German concentration camps
- Nazi concentration camps
- Nazi Party
- Nazi songs
- World War II
