= Selection (Holocaust) =

Sorting for enslavement or extermination

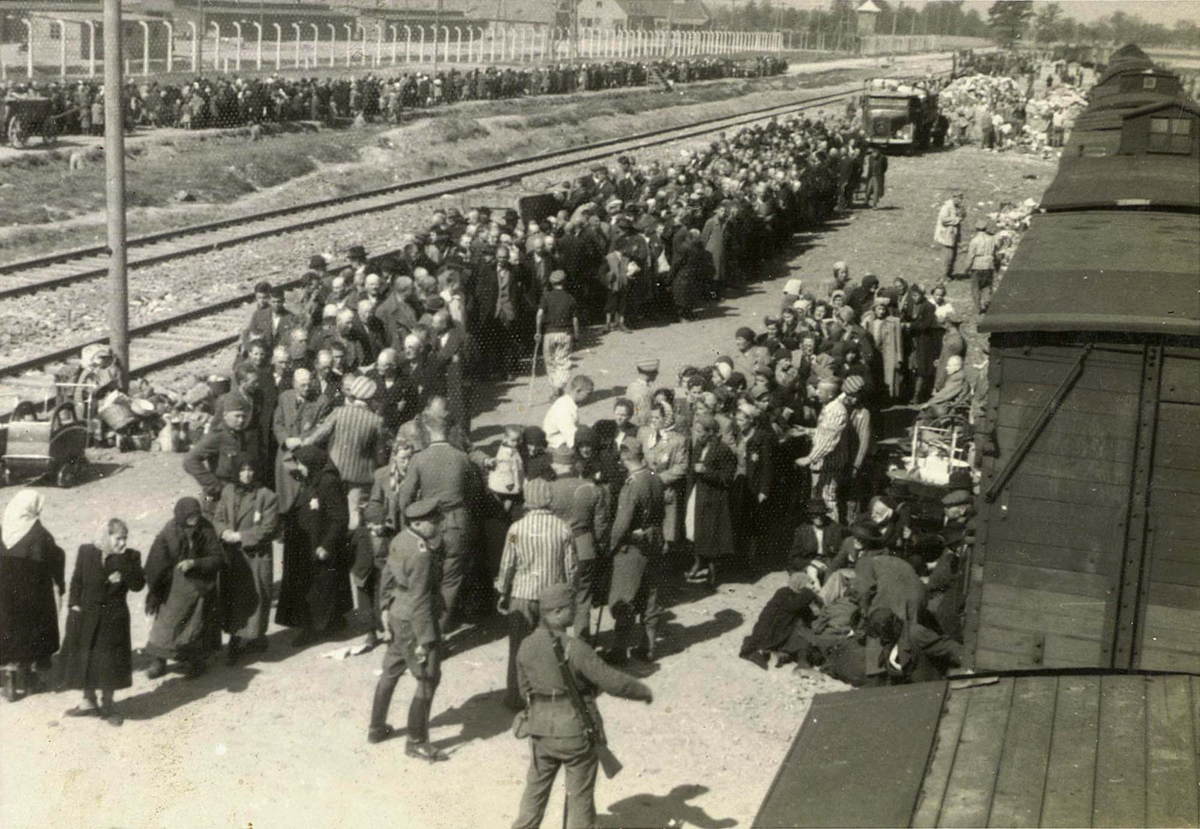
A photograph from the Auschwitz Album of selection at Auschwitz II-Birkenau on May 27, 1944. The deportees are separated with men on the left and women on the right.

Selection (German: Selektion) was the process of designating inmates either for murder, medical experiments or forced labor at a Nazi concentration camp.

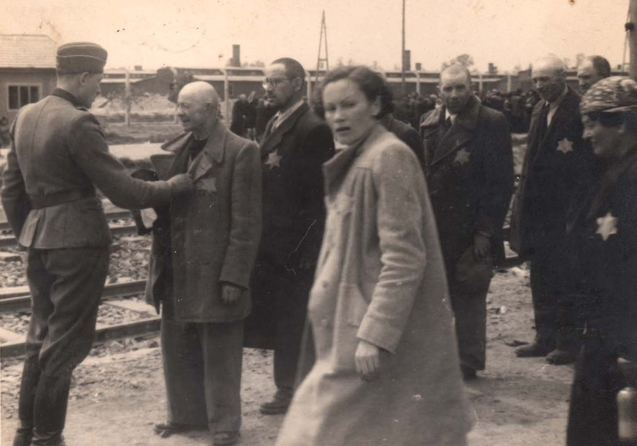
Scene from a selection in May 1944. An SS doctor inspects a Jewish man to see if he is fit for labor; if not, he would have been immediately sent to a gas chamber.

== Process ==
The arrival selection was first a separation by sex, and then a separation into either fit or unfit for work, as determined by a soldier, bureaucrat or doctor after a visual inspection or perhaps a question or two. Children under 16 (later 14), the elderly, women visibly pregnant, mothers who would not leave their children, the disabled, or anyone visibly weak or ill, were ineligible for "selection" and were immediately murdered. In addition to the initial selection upon arrival, subsequent selections would occur at subsequent prisoner counts, the Appellplatz, or in the blocks, the camp barracks. The selection officers were nominally looking for healthier, stronger laborers, but according to historian Jan Erik Schulte, camp guards and administrators were given maximum discretion in selections, which resulted in "ultimately only a superficially utilitarian-motivated selection process."

The selection process was heavily dependent on the labor-force needs of the camp at that time. Approximately 1 in 5 of all transported prisoners survived selection and were thus enslaved. Selection was specific to the camps, such as Auschwitz or Majdanek, that served some kind of industrial function for the regime. As one article put it, "Like Auschwitz-Birkenau, Majdanek was the rare concentration camp that was also a death camp. Forced labor from the camp was to man the shops and factories of an SS empire that would be centered in Lublin. This empire never materialized as SS chief Heinrich Himmler had fantasized, but some of its building blocks, including Majdanek, were put in place. The Germans established an elaborate hierarchy of power and order in the camp, which relied on violence from the camp commander down to the barracks elders for its functioning." The Aktion Reinhard extermination camps, such as Belzec, Chełmno, Sobibor and Treblinka, had essentially no selection, as all transported prisoners were murdered within hours of arriving.

Selection began with Aktion 14f13, the murder of prisoners who were too sick or weak for forced labor, and were considered a burden to the state. Action 14f13 was itself an outgrowth of Aktion T4, the mass-murder of the persons the Nazis deemed "life unworthy of life", such as the disabled and mentally ill. Josef Mengele used selection to find twins for his experiments at Auschwitz, as recalled by Eva Mozes Kor.

Miriam and I joined a group of about 10 or 12 sets of twins. We waited for a long time at the edge of the railroad ramp. They seemed to be waiting for everybody to be detrained and all the twins to be gathered. I looked around the camp. Everything appeared dark, gray, lifeless. Near the train, as the victims were being separated into two distinct groups, there stood one SS officer dressed in a neatly pressed uniform. He looked very sharp in his beautiful gleaming boots. It appeared to me that he was in charge. The officer doing the selection was Dr. Joseph Mengele.

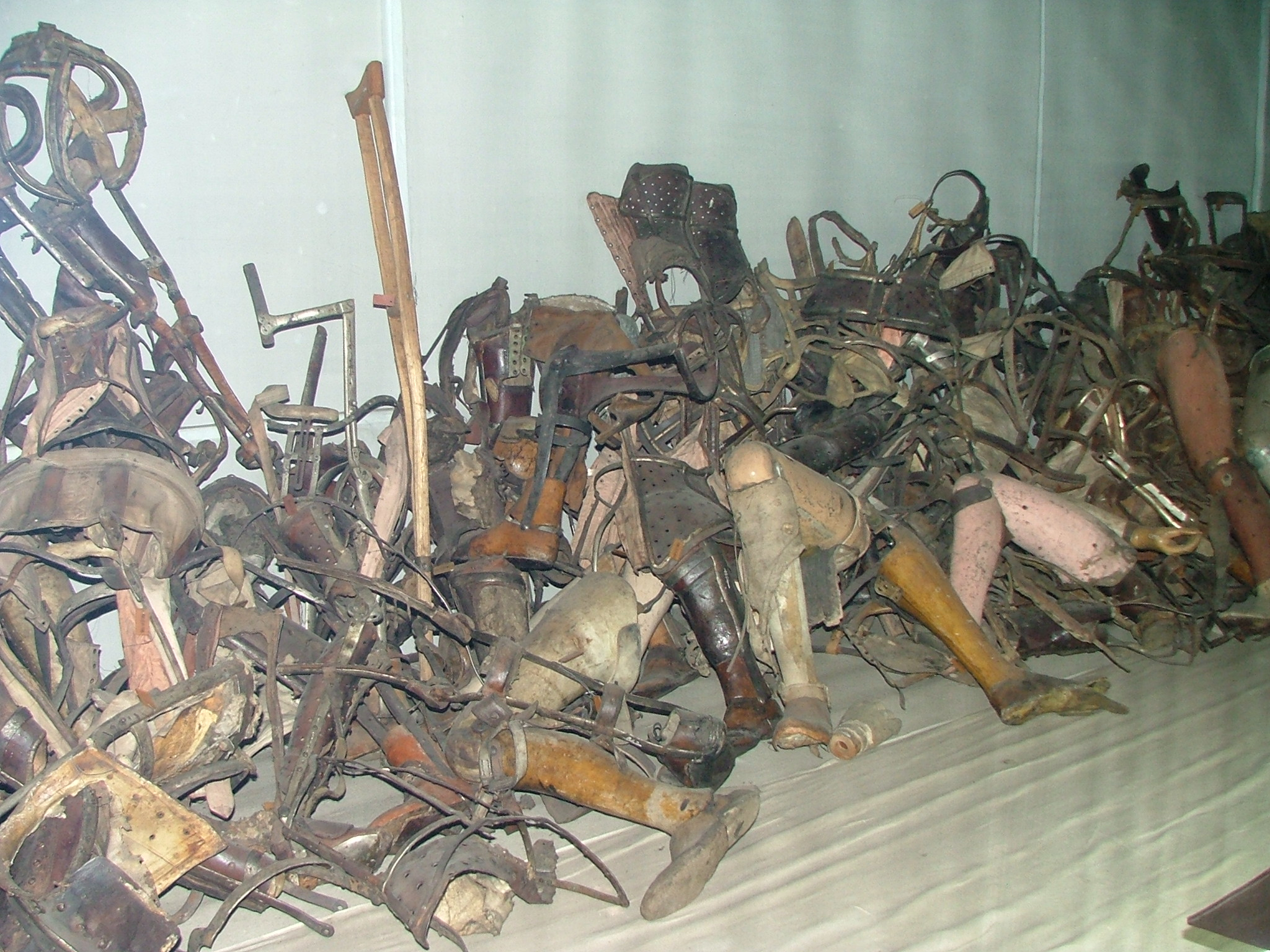
Prosthetic legs, canes and crutches taken at Auschwitz

The SS guards at the camps likely did not use the term Selektion, but instead would have referred to Aussortierung (transl. sorting or separating) and Ausmusterung (transl. retirement or decommissioning).
