= Ravensbrück concentration camp =

Women's concentration camp in Nazi Germany

Coordinates: 53°11′20.4″N 13°10′12″E

Ravensbrück
- Concentration camp
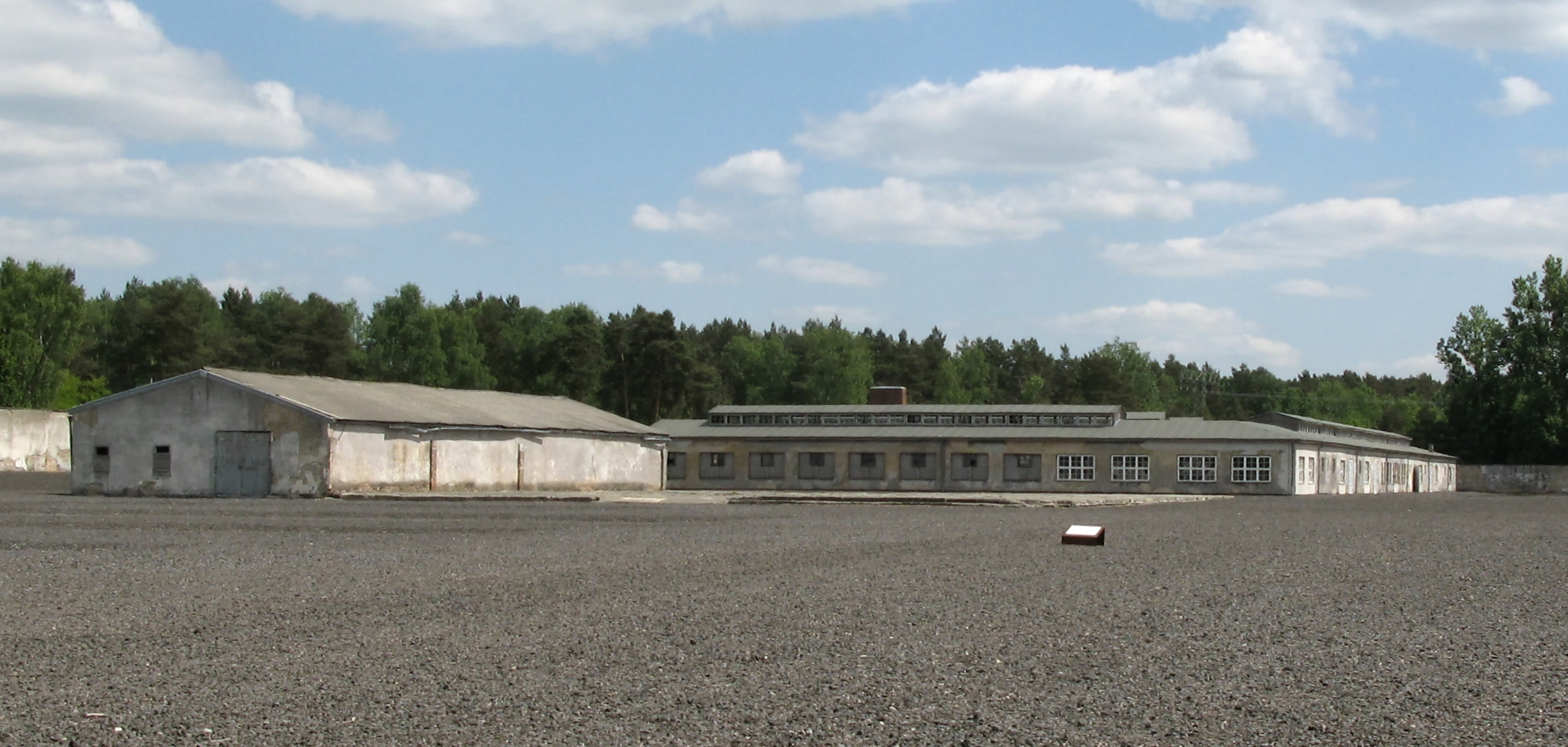
- Ravensbrück

- Location of Ravensbrück within Nazi Germany
- Location: Fürstenberg/Havel, Germany
- Commandant: Günther Tamaschke (May 1939 to August 1939); Max Koegel (January 1940 to August 1942); Fritz Suhren (August 1942 to April 1945)
- Operational: May 1939 – April 1945
- Number of gas chambers: 1
- Inmates: Mostly female political prisoners, 48,500 Polish; 28,000 Soviet Union, 20,000-plus Jews
- Number of inmates: 130,000 to 132,000
- Killed: Unknown; 30,000 to 90,000 died or were killed.
- Liberated by: Soviet Union, April 30, 1945; 81 years ago

Ravensbrück (German: [ˌʁaːvn̩sˈbʁʏk]) was a Nazi German concentration camp exclusively for women from 1939 to 1945, located in Northern Germany, 90 km (56 mi) north of Berlin at a site near the village of Ravensbrück (part of Fürstenberg/Havel). The camp memorial's estimated figure of 132,000 women who were in the camp during the war includes about 48,500 from Poland, 28,000 from the Soviet Union, almost 24,000 from Germany and Austria, nearly 8,000 from France, almost 2,000 from Belgium, and thousands from other countries including a few from the United Kingdom and the United States. More than 20,000 (15 percent) of the total were Jewish. More than 80 percent were political prisoners. Many prisoners were employed as slave laborers by Siemens & Halske. From 1942 to 1945, the Nazis undertook medical experiments on Ravensbrück prisoners to test the effectiveness of sulfonamides.

In the spring of 1941 the SS established a small adjacent camp for male inmates, who built and managed the camp's gas chambers in January 1945. Of the female prisoners who passed through the Ravensbrück camp, about 50,000 perished. No precise accounting for the number of prisoners murdered in the gas-chamber at Ravensbrück can be given, but a compilation of witness accounts suggests that the number was over 5,000 and the true figure may have been much higher.

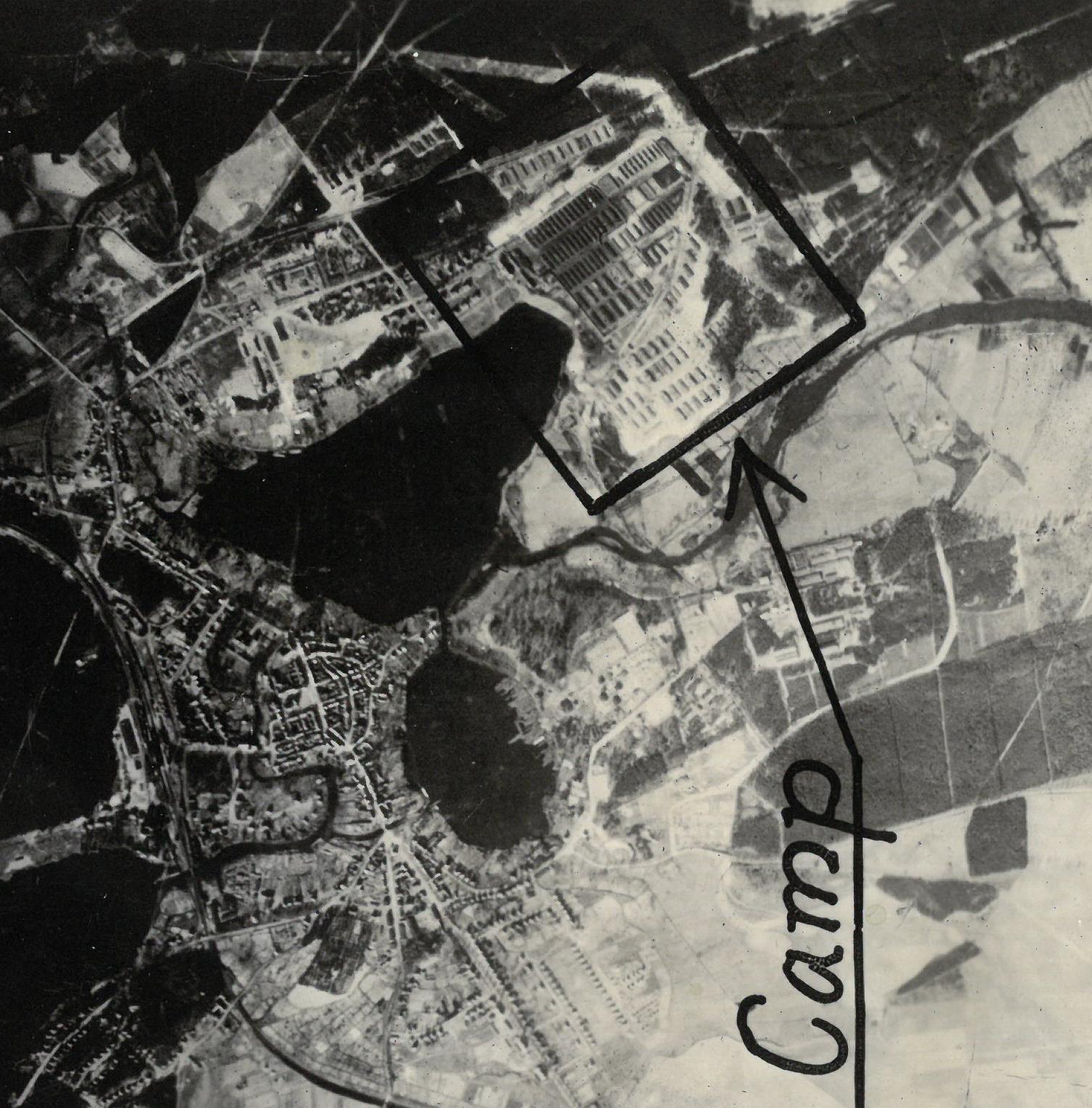
Aerial photo of Ravensbrück camp

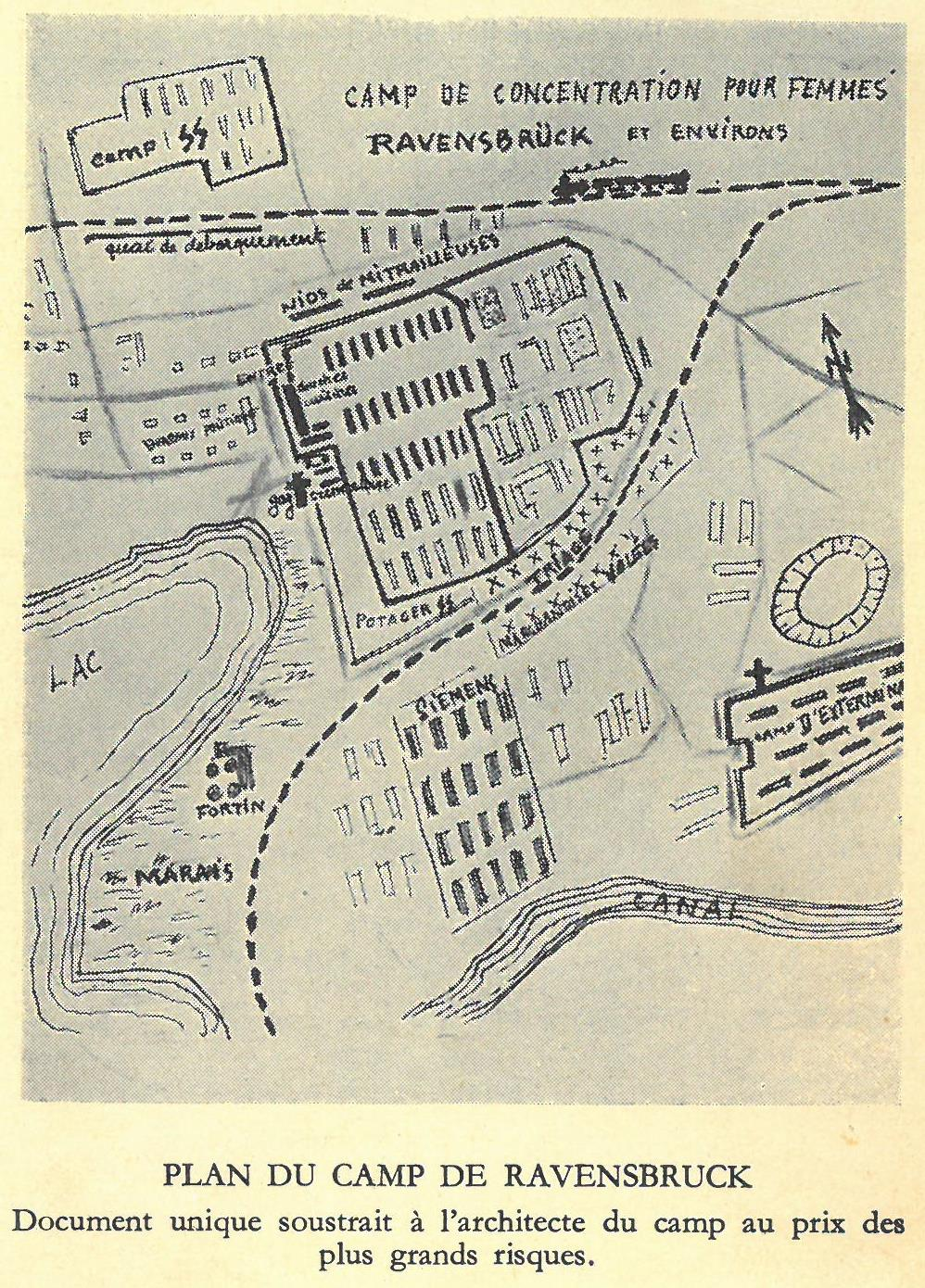
Plan of the camp

== Prisoners ==
Construction of the camp began in November 1938 on the order of the SS leader, Heinrich Himmler, and was unusual in that it was intended exclusively to hold female inmates. Ravensbrück first housed prisoners in May 1939, when the SS moved 900 women from the Lichtenburg concentration camp in Saxony. Eight months after the start of World War II the camp's maximum capacity was already exceeded. It underwent major expansion following the invasion of Poland. By the summer of 1941, with the launch of Operation Barbarossa, an estimated total of 5,000 women were imprisoned and fed gradually decreasing hunger rations. By the end of 1942 the inmate population of Ravensbrück had grown to about 10,000. The greatest number of prisoners at one time in Ravensbrück was probably about 45,000.

Between 1939 and 1945 some 130,000 to 132,000 prisoners passed through the Ravensbrück camp system. According to Encyclopædia Britannica, about 50,000 of them perished from disease, starvation, overwork and despair; some 2,200 were murdered in the gas chambers. Upon liberation on 29–30 April 1945, approximately 3,500 prisoners were still alive in the main camp.

Although the inmates came from every country in German-occupied Europe, the largest single national group in the camp were Polish. In the spring of 1941 the SS authorities established a small men's camp adjacent to the main camp. The male inmates built and managed the gas chambers for the camp in 1944.

There were children in the camp as well. At first they arrived with mothers who were Romani or Jews incarcerated in the camp or were born to imprisoned women. There were few children early on, including a few Czech children from Lidice in July 1942. Later the children in the camp represented almost all nations of Europe occupied by Germany. Between April and October 1944, their number increased considerably, consisting of two groups. One group was composed of Romani children brought into the camp with their mothers or sisters after the Romani camp in Auschwitz-Birkenau was closed. The other group included mostly children who were brought with Polish mothers sent to Ravensbrück after the collapse of the Warsaw Uprising of 1944. Most of these children died of starvation.

Ravensbrück had 70 sub-camps used for slave labour that were spread across an area from the Baltic Sea to Bavaria.

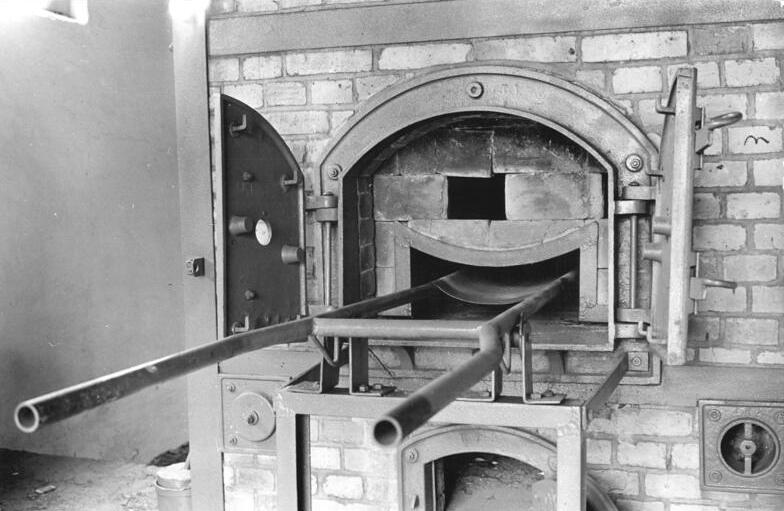
Ravensbrück crematorium

Among the thousands executed at Ravensbrück were four members of the British World War II organization Special Operations Executive (SOE): Denise Bloch, Cecily Lefort, Lilian Rolfe and Violette Szabo. Other victims included the Roman Catholic nuns Epiphania Pritzl and Élise Rivet, Élisabeth de Rothschild (the only member of the Rothschild family to die in the Holocaust), Russian Orthodox nun St. Maria Skobtsova, the 25-year-old French Princess Anne de Bauffremont-Courtenay, Milena Jesenská, lover of Franz Kafka, and Olga Benário, wife of the Brazilian Communist leader Luís Carlos Prestes. The largest single group of women executed at the camp were 200 young Polish members of the Home Army. A number of lesbians were imprisoned and murdered at the camp, including Henny Schermann and Mary Pünjer.

Among the survivors of Ravensbrück was author Corrie ten Boom, arrested with her family for harbouring Jews in their home in Haarlem, the Netherlands. She documented her ordeal alongside her sister Betsie ten Boom in her book The Hiding Place, which was eventually produced as a motion picture. Polish Countess Karolina Lanckoronska, an art historian and author of Michelangelo in Ravensbrück, was imprisoned there from 1943 until 1945. SOE agents who survived were Yvonne Baseden and Eileen Nearne, who was a prisoner in 1944 before being transferred to another work camp and escaping. Englishwoman Mary Lindell and American Virginia d'Albert-Lake, both leaders of escape and evasion lines in France, survived. Another SOE agent, Odette Sansom, also survived and is the subject of several biographies documenting her ordeals. Among the Communist survivors of the camp was French Resistance member Louise Magadur.

Maisie Renault, sister of Gilbert Renault, wrote about her captivity in Ravensbrück in La Grande Misère which won France's Prix Verité in 1948. Other survivors who wrote memoirs about their experiences include Gemma La Guardia Gluck, sister of New York Mayor Fiorello La Guardia, as well as Germaine Tillion, a Ravensbrück survivor from France who published her own eyewitness account of the camp in 1975. After liberation, Anna Garcin-Mayade, French painter and member of the French Resistance, painted works illustrating prisoners and the terrible conditions of the camps; these were recreations of works she had created while in the camps.

In 2005, Ravensbrück survivor Judith Sherman published a book of prose and poetry titled Say the Name. Sherman writes of her childhood home in Kurima, Czechoslovakia, and of several deportations, hiding in homes and in the forest, undergoing torture, and witnessing murder in Ravensbrück before her final liberation. Approximately 500 women from Ravensbrück were transferred to Dachau, where they were assigned as labourers to the Agfa-Commando; the women assembled ignition timing devices for bombs, artillery ammunition, and V-1 and V-2 rockets.

Gustav Noske, German Minister of Defense from 1919 to 1920, stayed in Ravensbrück concentration camp after his arrest by the Gestapo in 1944. Later Noske was freed by advancing Allied troops from a Gestapo prison in Berlin.

== Guards ==
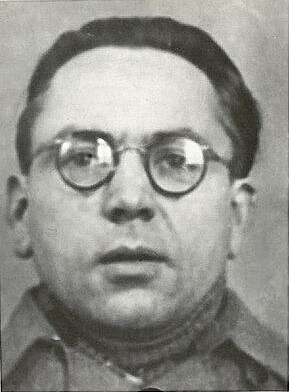
Hans Pflaum (1910–1950)

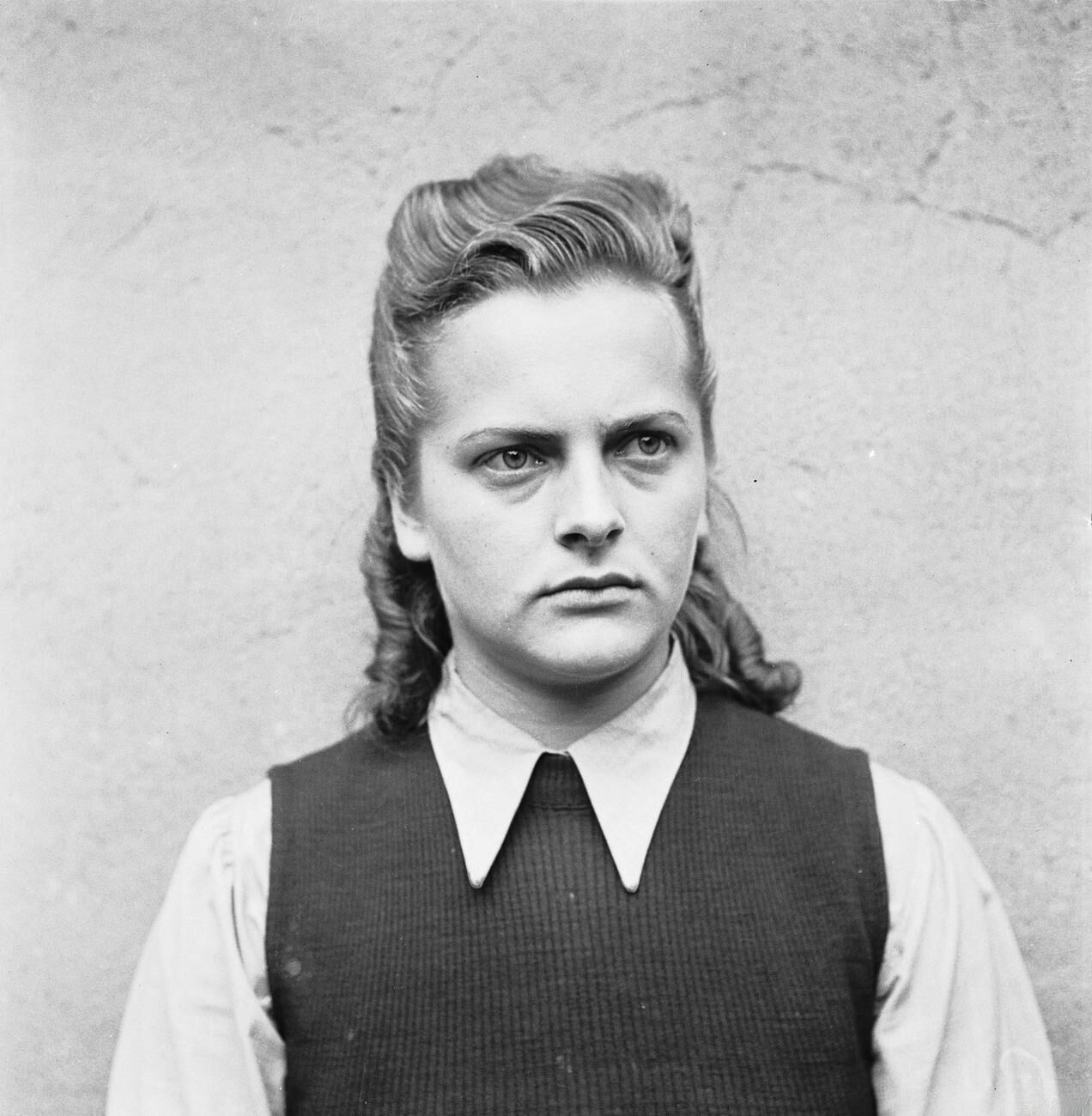
Aufseherin Irma Grese "the Hyena", 1945

Camp commandants included :

- SS-Standartenführer Günther Tamaschke from May 1939 to August 1939
- SS-Hauptsturmführer Max Koegel from January 1940 till August 1942
- SS-Hauptsturmführer Fritz Suhren from August 1942 until the camp's liberation at the end of April 1945

The other male officers were :

- Paul Borchert, chief of political section.
- Edmund Bräuning, Schutzhaftlagerführer, assistant to Fritz Suhren.
- Hans Pflaum, chief of labor section.
- Albert Sauer, arrived at Ravensbrück with Johann Schwarzhuber, bringing 8,000 prisoners from Auschwitz.
- Johann Schwarzhuber, assistant to Fritz Suhren, replaced Edmund Bräuning around January 1945. He introduced the gas chamber in the camp.

Besides the male Nazi administrators, the camp staff included over 150 female guards assigned to oversee the prisoners at some point during the camp's operational period. The technical term for a female guard in a Nazi camp was an Aufseherin, 'overseer'. Ravensbrück also served as a training camp for over 4,000 female overseers. The women either stayed in the camp or eventually served in other camps.

Some of these women went on to serve as chief wardresses in other camps. Several dozen block overseers (Blockführerinnen), accompanied by dogs, SS men and whips oversaw the prisoners in their living quarters in Ravensbrück, at roll call and during food distribution. At any single time, a report overseer (Rapportführerin) handled the roll calls and general discipline of the internees. Rosel Laurenzen originally served as head of the labour pool at the camp (Arbeitdienstführerin) along with her assistant Gertrud Schoeber. In 1944 Greta Bösel took over this command. Other high ranking female guards included Christel Jankowsky, Ilse Göritz, Margot Dreschel, and Elisabeth Kammer. Head wardress at the Uckermark death complex of Ravensbrück was Ruth Neudeck (January 1945 – March 1945). Regular Aufseherinnen were not usually granted access to the internees' compound unless they supervised inside work details. Most of the SS women met their prisoner work gangs at the gate each morning and returned them later in the day. The treatment by the female guards in Ravensbrück was normally brutal. Elfriede Muller, an Aufseherin in the camp was so harsh that the prisoners nicknamed her "The Beast of Ravensbrück". Other guards in the camp included Hermine Boettcher-Brueckner, Luise Danz, Irma Grese, Herta Oberheuser, and Margarethe de Hueber.

The female chief overseers (Lagerfuehrerinnen and Oberaufseherinnen) in Ravensbrück were:

1. May 1939 – March 1942: Oberaufseherin Johanna Langefeld and her assistant Emma Zimmer
2. March–October 1942: Oberaufseherin Maria Mandl and assistant Margarete Gallinat
3. October 1942 – August 1943 Johanna Langefeld who returned from Auschwitz
4. August 1943 – September 1944 Chef Oberaufseherin Anna Klein (née Plaubel), with deputy wardress Dorothea Binz
5. September 1944 – April 1945 Chef Oberaufseherin Luise Brunner, Lagerfuehrerin Lotte Toberentz (January 1945 – April), with deputy wardress (Stellvertrende Oberaufseherin) Dorothea Binz; in 1945 nurse Vera Salvequart used to poison the sick to avoid having to carry them to the gas chambers

In 1973, the U.S. government extradited Hermine Braunsteiner, living in Maspeth, Queens, NY, for trial in Germany for war crimes, and in 2006, extradited Elfriede Rinkel, 84, a former Ravensbrück guard (1944-1945), who had lived in San Francisco, CA since 1959.

== Life in the camp ==
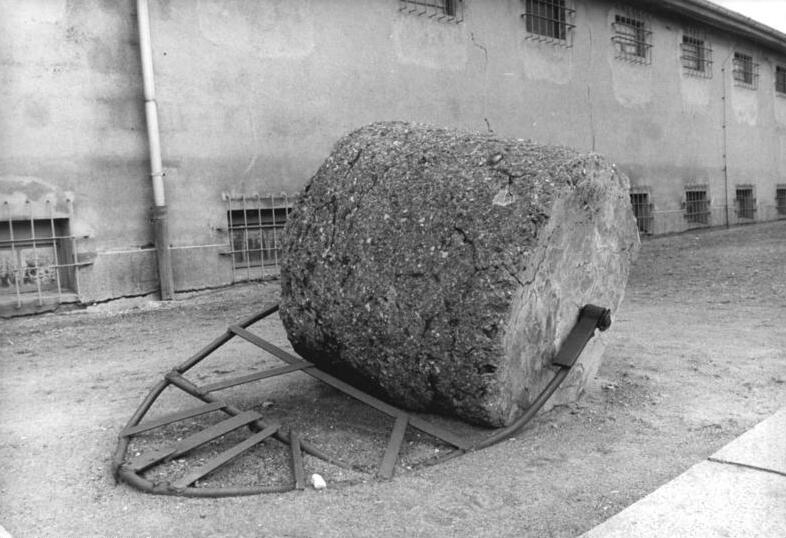
Road roller

When a new prisoner arrived at Ravensbrück she was required to wear a colour-coded triangle (a Winkel) that identified her by category, with a letter sewn within the triangle indicating the prisoner's nationality. For example, Polish women wore red triangles, denoting a political prisoner, with a letter "P" (by 1942, Polish women became the largest national component at the camp). Soviet prisoners of war, and German and Austrian Communists, wore red triangles; common criminals wore green triangles; and Jehovah's Witnesses were labelled with lavender triangles. Prostitutes, Romani, homosexuals, and women who refused to marry were lumped together, with black triangles. Jewish women wore yellow triangles but sometimes, unlike the other prisoners, they wore a second triangle for the other categories. For example, quite often it was for Rassenschande ("racial pollution").

Some detainees had their hair shaved, such as those from Czechoslovakia and Poland, but other transports did not. In 1943, for instance, a group of Norwegian women came to the camp (Norwegians/Scandinavians were ranked by the Nazis as the purest of all Aryans). None of them had their hair shaved.

Between 1942 and 1943, almost all Jewish women from the Ravensbrück camp were sent to Auschwitz in several transports, following Nazi policy to make Germany judenrein (cleansed of Jews). Based on the Nazis' incomplete transport list (Zugangsliste), documenting 25,028 names of women sent by Nazis to the camp, it is estimated that the Ravensbrück prisoner population's ethnic structure comprised: Poles 24.9%, Germans 19.9%, Jews 15.1%, Soviets 15.0%, French 7.3%, Romani 5.4%, other 12.4%. The Gestapo further categorised the inmates as: political 83.54%, anti-social 12.35%, criminal 2.02%, Jehovah's Witnesses 1.11%, Rassenschande (racial defilement) 0.78%, other 0.20%. The list is one of the most important documents, preserved in the last moments of the camp operation by members of the Polish underground girl guides unit "Mury" (The Walls). The rest of the camp documents were burned by escaping SS overseers in pits or in the crematorium.

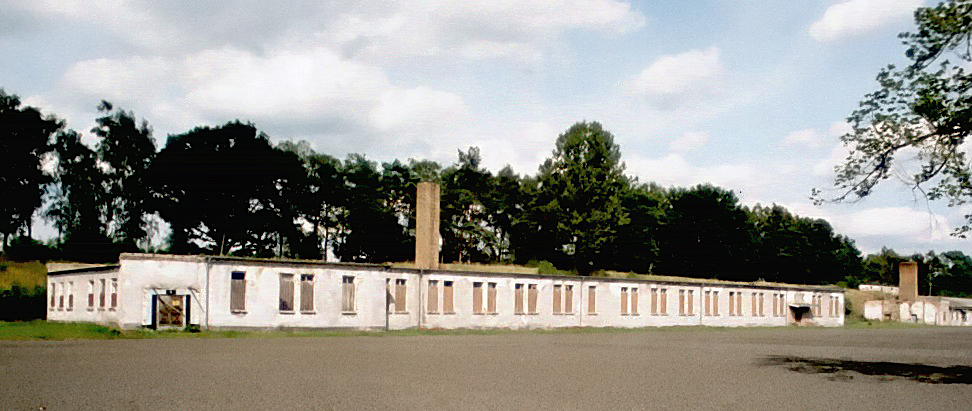
Barracks on the grounds of the former women's camp

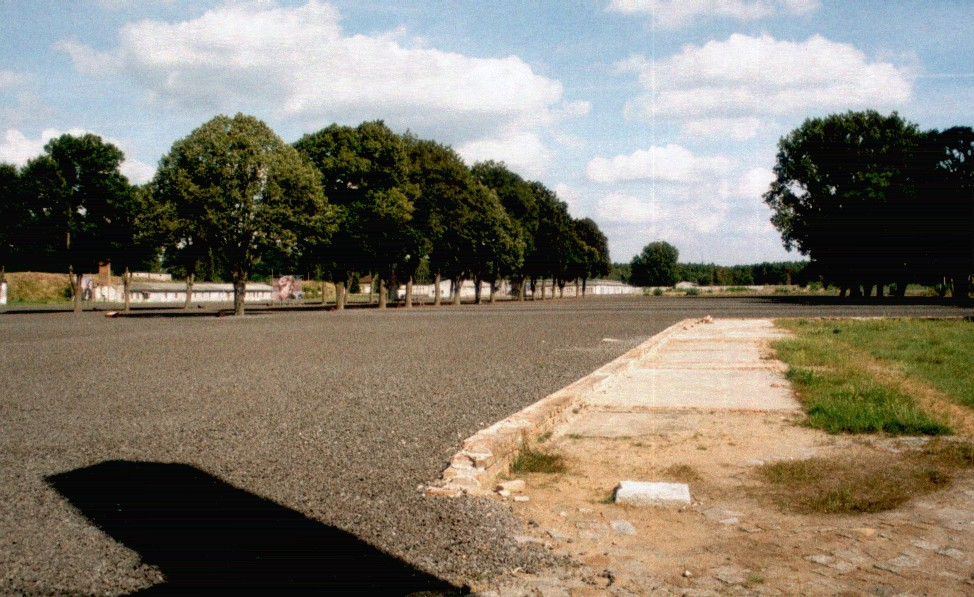
Site of the former women's camp

One form of resistance was the secret education programmes organised by prisoners for their fellow inmates. All national groups had some sort of programme. The most extensive were among Polish women, wherein various high school-level classes were taught by experienced teachers.

In 1939 and 1940, camp living conditions were acceptable: laundry and bed linen were changed regularly and the food was adequate, although in the first winter of 1939/40, limitations began to be noticeable. The German Communist, Margarete Buber-Neumann, came to Ravensbrück as an inmate after nearly two years in a Russian Soviet Gulag. She described her first impressions of Ravensbrück in comparison to the Soviet camp in Karaganda:

I looked across the great square, and could not believe my eyes. It was surrounded by manicured lawns, covered by flower beds on which bloomed bright red flowers. A wide street, which led to a large open area, was flanked by two rows of wooden barracks, on both sides stood rows of young trees and along the roadside ran straight flower beds as far as the eye could see. The square and the streets seemed freshly raked. To the left towards the watchtower, I saw a white wooden barrack and beside it a large cage, the size of a birdhouse the like you see at a zoo. Within it paraded peacocks (stolzierten) and on a climbing tree dangled monkeys and a parrot which always screamed the same word, "Mama". I wondered, "this is a concentration camp"?

Buber-Nuemann wrote how her first meal in Ravensbrück exceeded her expectations, when she was served sweet porridge with dried fruit (backobst), plus a generous portion of bread, margarine, and sausage.

Conditions quickly deteriorated. Elsie Maréchal, a young Belgian who worked with the Comet Line, was a prisoner at Ravensbrück from 1943 to 1945. She described the conditions:

They didn't shoot the women. We were to die of misery, hunger and exhaustion...when we arrived at Ravensbrück, it was the worst. The first thing I saw was a cart with all the dead piled on it. Their arms and legs hanging out, and mouths and eyes wide open. They reduced us to nothing. We didn't even feel like we had the value of cattle. You worked and you died.

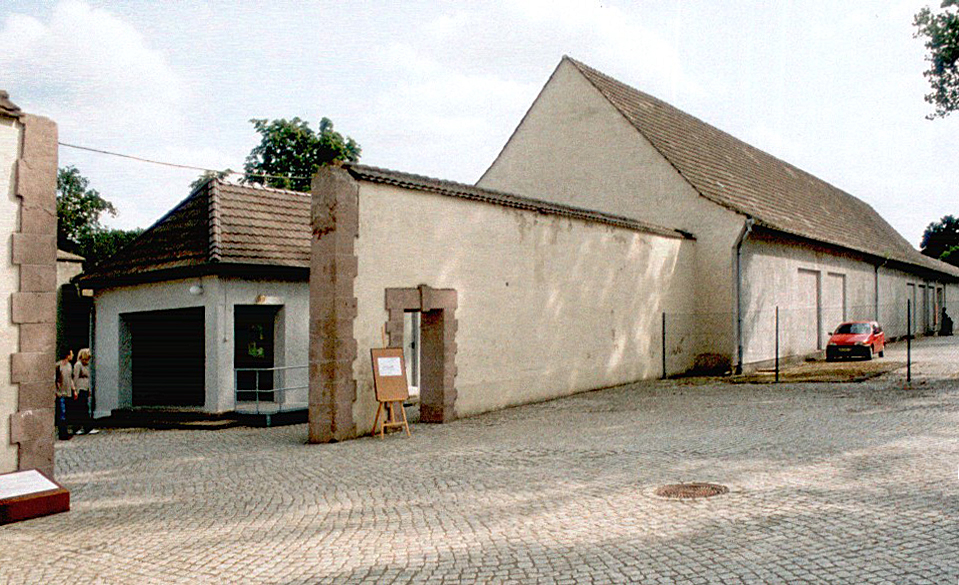
Camp (external view), with guard house

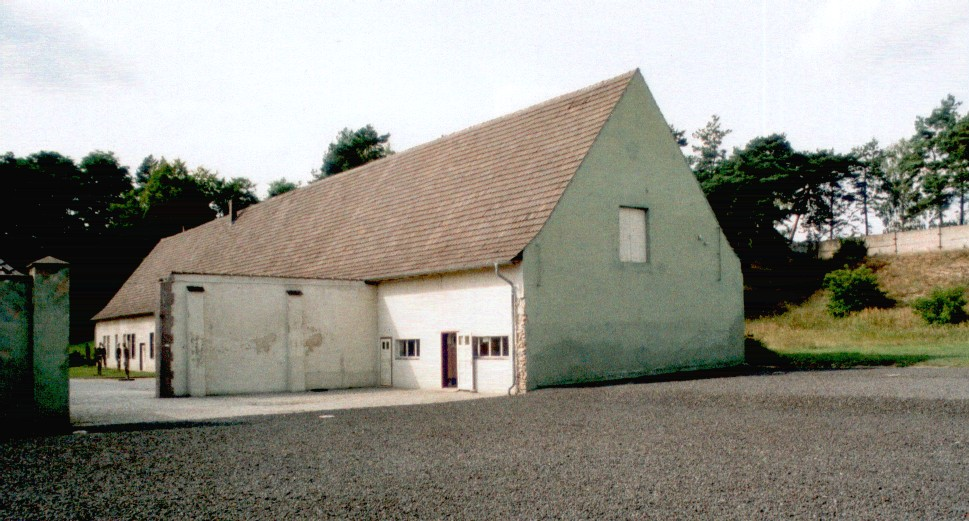
Former telephone exchange and water plant

=== Nazi medical experiments ===
Starting in the summer of 1942, medical experiments were conducted without consent on 86 women; 74 of them were Polish inmates. Two types of experiments were conducted on the Polish political prisoners. The first type tested the efficacy of sulfonamide drugs. These experiments involved deliberate cutting into and infecting of leg bones and muscles with virulent bacteria, cutting nerves, introducing substances like pieces of wood or glass into tissues, and fracturing bones.

The second set of experiments studied bone, muscle, and nerve regeneration, and the possibility of transplanting bones from one person to another. Out of the 74 Polish victims, called Kaninchen, Króliki, Lapins, or "Rabbits" by the experimenters, five died as a result of the experiments, six with unhealed wounds were executed, and (with assistance from other inmates) the rest survived with permanent physical damage. Four such survivors—Jadwiga Dzido, Maria Broel-Plater, Władysława Karolewska, and Maria Kuśmierczuk—testified against Nazi doctors at the Doctors' Trial in 1946.

Between 120 and 140 Romani women were sterilized in the camp in January 1945. All had been deceived into signing the consent form, having been told by the camp overseers that the German authorities would release them if they complied.

=== Forced labor ===
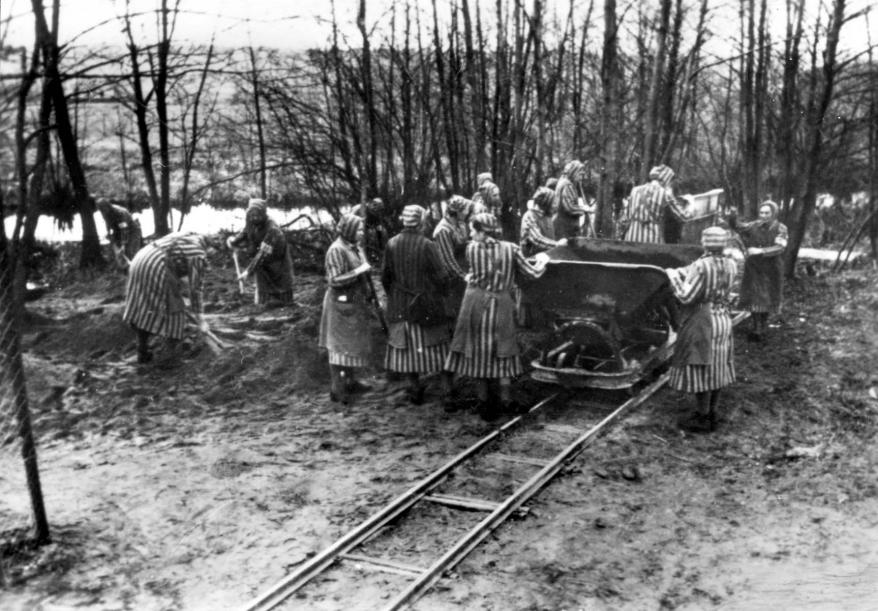
Female prisoners at Ravensbruck performing labor in 1939

All inmates were required to do heavy labor ranging from strenuous outdoor jobs to building the V-2 rocket parts for Siemens. The SS also built several factories near Ravensbrück for the production of textiles and electrical components.

Ravensbrück was the main supplier of women for the brothels set up at many major Nazi camps toward the end of the war. Although women often volunteered for these positions, hoping they would be spared the most difficult physical labour and perhaps receive better rations, most in fact died quickly due to sexual abuse and the rampant spread of venereal disease.

For the women in the camp, it was important to retain some of their dignity and sense of humanity. Therefore, they made necklaces, bracelets, and other personal items, like small dolls and books, as keepsakes. These personal effects were of great importance to the women and many of them risked their lives to keep these possessions. Some of these types of effects can be seen at the exhibition "Voices from Ravensbrück" (hosted by Lund University Library, Sweden).

=== Murder in gas chamber ===
The bodies of those perished or killed in the camp were cremated in the nearby Fürstenberg crematorium until 1943 when SS authorities constructed a crematorium at a site near the camp prison. In January 1945, the SS also transformed a hut near the crematorium into a gas chamber, where they murdered several thousand prisoners before the camp's liberation in April 1945. In particular, they executed some 3,600 prisoners from the Uckermark police camp for "deviant" girls and women, which was taken under the control of the Ravensbrück SS at the start of 1945.

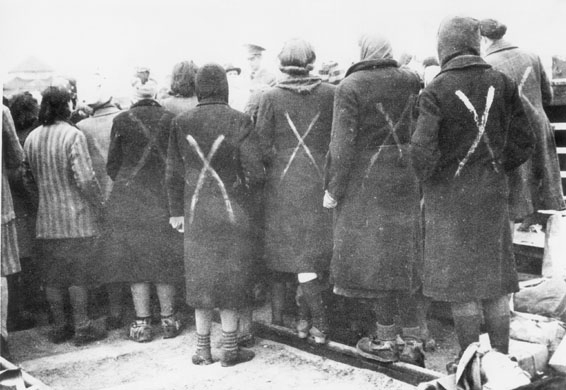
Surviving female prisoners gathered when the Red Cross arrived at Ravensbrück in April 1945. The white paint camp crosses show they were prisoners, not civilians.

== Death march and liberation ==
In January 1945, prior to the liberation of the remaining camp survivors, an estimated 45,000 female prisoners and over 5,000 male prisoners remained at Ravensbrück, including children and those transported from satellite camps only to be murdered in the gas chamber, which was being performed in haste.

With the Soviet Red Army's rapid approach in the spring of 1945, the SS leadership decided to remove as many prisoners as they could, in order to avoid leaving live witnesses behind who could testify as to what had occurred in the camp. At the end of March, the SS ordered all physically capable women to form a column and exit the camp in the direction of northern Mecklenburg, forcing over 24,500 prisoners on a death march. Some 2,500 ethnic German prisoners remaining were released, and 500 women were handed over to officials of the Swedish and Danish Red Cross shortly after the evacuation. On 30 April 1945, fewer than 3,500 malnourished and sickly prisoners were discovered alive at the camp when it was liberated by the Red Army. The survivors of the death march were liberated in the following hours by a Soviet scout unit.

== Ravensbrück trials ==
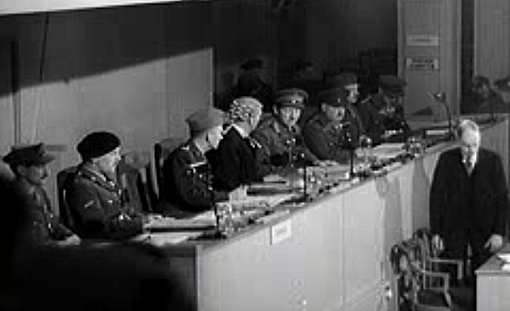
The first Ravensbrück trial, 1947: sentencing

The SS guards, female Aufseherinnen guards, and former prisoner-functionaries with administrative positions at the camp were arrested at the end of the war by the Allies and tried at the Hamburg Ravensbrück trials from 1946 to 1948. Sixteen of the accused were found guilty of war crimes and crimes against humanity and sentenced to death.

Having fled to Bavaria, Fritz Suhren and Hans Pflaum were caught by the American troops in 1949 and were sent to the French occupation zone. The trial and appeal took place from February to May 1950. The jury was composed of representatives from the French, Dutch and Luxembourg governments, presided by the chief justice officer of the French zone. Several dozens of former prisoners were subpoenaed. Suhren and Pflaum were accused of war crimes and crimes against humanity. They were sentenced to death and executed on 12 June 1950.

== Memorial site ==
=== German Democratic Republic ===
On the site of the former concentration camp, there is a memorial. In 1954, the sculptor Will Lammert was commissioned to design the memorial site between the crematorium, the camp wall, and Schwedtsee Lake. Up to his death in 1957, the artist created a large number of sculpted models of women. On 12 September 1959, the Ravensbrück National Memorial was inaugurated outside the former concentration camp on an area of 3.5 ha between the former camp wall and the shore of the Schwedtsee Lake. Rosa Thälmann, a former concentration camp inmate and widow of the politician Ernst Thälmann, held the opening speech. Compared to Buchenwald and Sachsenhausen, it was the smallest of the three National Memorials of the German Democratic Republic (GDR).

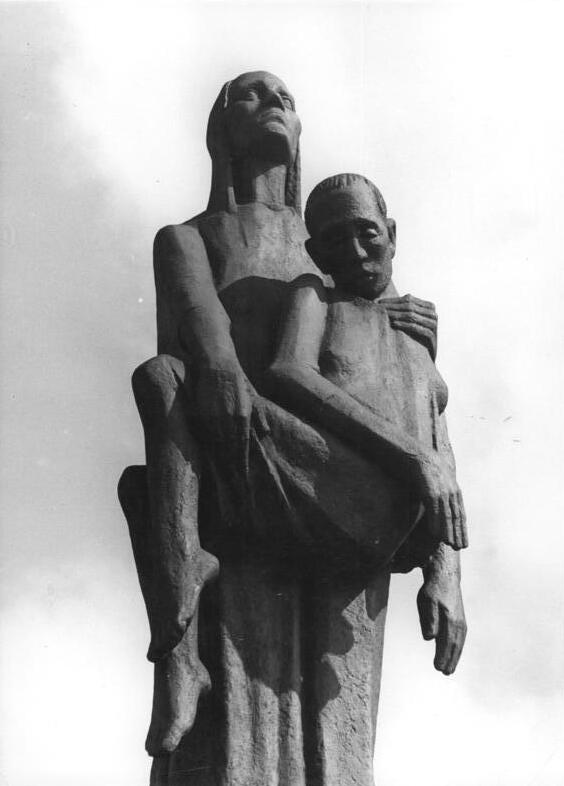
Will Lammert, memorial statue Tragende (Woman with Burden), 1959

For the inaugural opening of the National Memorial site, a scaled-up version of Tragende (Woman with Burden) was created (under the supervision of Fritz Cremer) and exhibited. This central symbolic figure, also known as the "Pietà of Ravensbrück", stands atop a stele on the peninsula in Lake Schwedtsee. The Zwei Stehende (Two Women Standing) monument also has its origins in Lammert's models. Other statues, which were also originally created for Ravensbrück, have been on display at the Old Jewish Cemetery in Berlin Mitte since 1985, in commemoration of the Jewish victims of fascism.

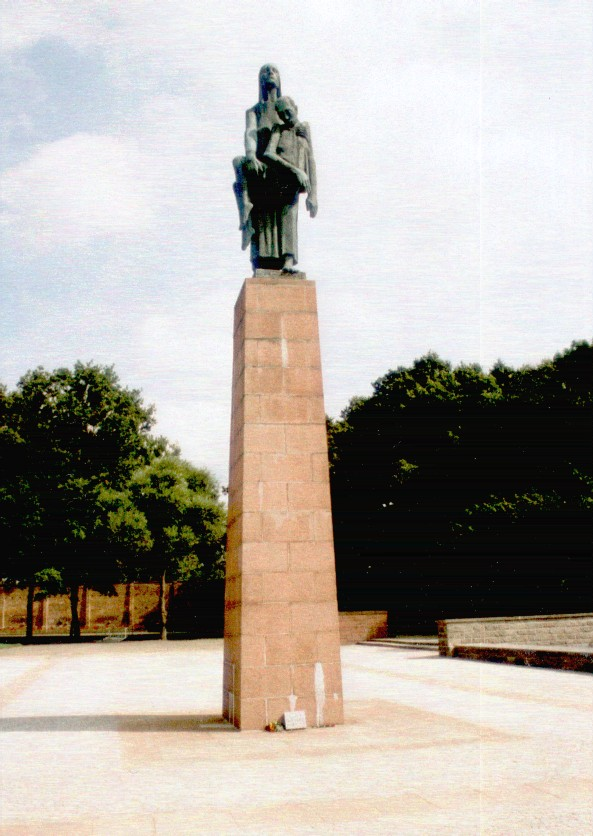
Statue, 2005

Since 1984, the former SS headquarters have housed the Museum des antifaschistischen Widerstandskampfes (Museum of Anti-fascist Resistance). After the withdrawal from Germany of the Soviet Army, which up to 1993 had been using parts of the former camp for military purposes, it became possible to incorporate more areas of the camp into the memorial site.

The three National Memorials Buchenwald, Sachsenhausen, and Ravensbrück played a central role in the GDR's remembrance policy under Erich Honecker. They were controlled by the Ministry of Culture and served as places of identification and legitimisation of the GDR. According to historian Anne-Kathleen Tillack-Graf the political instrumentalisation of these memorials, especially for the current needs of the GDR, became particularly clear during the major celebrations of the liberation of the concentration camps.

=== After German reunification ===
Today, the former accommodation blocks for the female guards are a youth hostel and youth meeting center. In the course of the reorganization, which took place in the early 1990s, the Museum des antifaschistischen Widerstandskampfes was replaced by two new permanent exhibitions: "Women of Ravensbrück", which displays the biographies of 27 former prisoners, and "Ravensbrück. Topography and History of the Women's Concentration Camp", which provides information about the origins of the camp, describes daily life in the camp, and explains the principle of Vernichtung durch Arbeit (extermination through work). Since 2004 there has also been an exhibition about the female guards at the Ravensbrück Women's Concentration Camp, housed in another of their former accommodation blocks. Additionally, temporary exhibitions of special interest are held regularly at the memorial.

On 16 and 17 April 2005, a ceremony was held to commemorate the 60th anniversary of the camp's liberation. Among those invited were approximately 600 survivors from all over the world, mostly eastern Europe. At the same time a new, permanent outdoor exhibition was opened, on the theme of the train transports to Ravensbrück. Its central exhibit is a refurbished goods wagon. The exhibition's information boards describe the origins of the transports and how they developed over time and explain the different types of trains, where they arrived, and the part played by the local residents. It is probably the only exhibition so far at a German memorial which is dedicated solely to the subject of the transports to the camp.

== Monuments outside of Germany ==
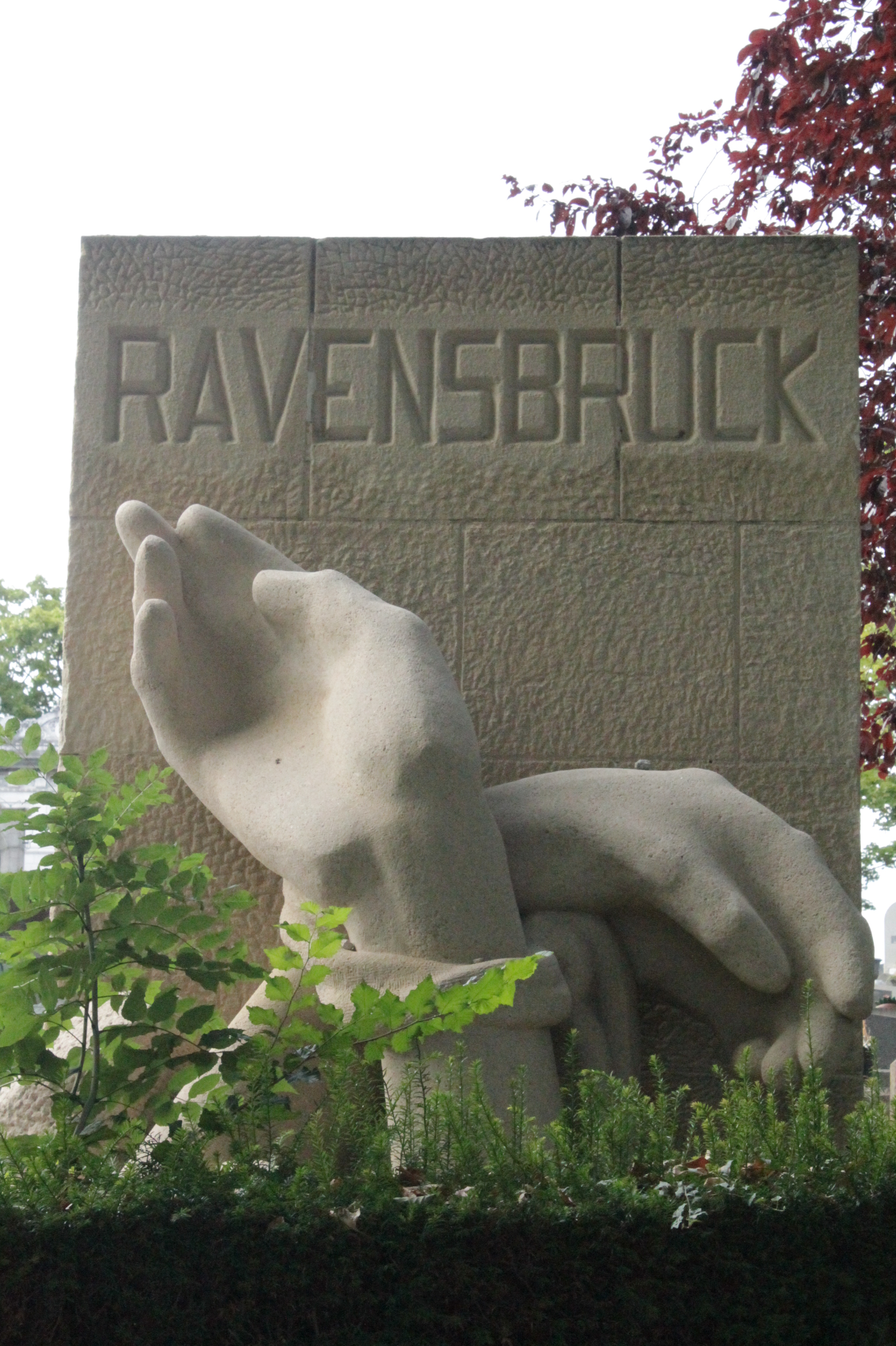
Memorial to Ravensbruck Concentration Camp, Pere Lachaise Cemetery, Paris

A monument to the French victims of Ravensbruck is one of the memorials to several concentration camps in Pere Lachaise Cemetery in Paris.

== Archaeology and artifacts ==
Ravensbrück did not have its own burial site, so most of the bodies were kept nearby at the site of their cremation. In 2019, the archaeological remains of Polish women were found in the Fürstenberg cemetery. Nine urns and two plaques were discovered. Their ashes were found buried with metal plaques that had once been part of their urns. The urns had since broken down in the soil but the plaques still have the identities of those who were buried there. Previously in 1989, a mass grave was found by the cemetery accidentally. In more recent excavations, archaeologists have found human body parts that were never fully burned in cremation. Ravensbrück archaeology is hard to come by from the actual site itself, as most of its artifacts escaped with its survivors.

Many of these artifacts were lost once some of the survivors reached Sweden. Survivors kept them hidden in the waistbands and hems of their clothes. As the women were being cleaned, their clothes were burned. While the women showed hesitation in getting rid of their clothes, no one voiced why they were upset about it. They didn't yet trust the people taking care of them after all they had endured. Karin Landgren Blomqvist helped the survivors but regrets this detail:

The clothes one was to take care of proved to be dirty rags, infested with lice, which were according to Swedish standards too worn down to be worth cleaning. The consequence was that it was all burned. Many survivors protested, but few dared to say why. They dared not believe we were fully without German influence. We had been too naïve and unsuspecting. Inseams, hems, and waistbands, many had with great effort and danger for life during internment in camp managed to save personal souvenirs and treasures. Now, when liberation was a fact, they lost these very last objects from their original lives.

These were things secretly made in the camp. Prisoners could be punished if caught but many disregarded camp rules and continued to make art in secret, such as dolls for orphaned or lost children. Chances were not good for children at Ravensbrück. Many lost their mothers, and as a result lost what little protection they did have. Many were medically experimented on or killed. Children on their own would not survive in the camp but women would step forward and behave as surrogate/adoptive mothers, making dolls and taking care of them.

The creation of art or personal belongings in the camp was strictly prohibited. Despite this, there are still artifacts found today that display resistance. A sprig of the lily of the valley is a prime example. While only a piece of plastic, if caught could be considered an act of "sabotage" and largely punishable. In an interview done just after liberation in Sweden, Interview 420 describes: "The smallest infractions were elevated to the level of 'sabotage', which brought the highest possible sentences: whipping, the bunker, and even execution by shooting. For making toe-warmers with camp wool for her stockings in the winter, a prisoner would get 25 blows and two weeks in the bunker". Many of the items were made of spare bits of plastic, wood, or cloth.

In 2017, 27 secret letters were gifted to the Museum of Martyrology in Lublin. These letters describe the camp in detail, including the doctors practicing medical experimentation. Concealed in the sofa of Krystyna Czyż, they spent decades hidden away until their donation. In September 1941, sisters Janina and Krystyna Iwańska, Wanda Wójtasik, and Krystyna Czyż were sent to Ravensbrück for their assistance of the Polish Underground. In 1942, medical experimentation was introduced and began with a group of 86 women, including the four letter-writers. As detailed in the letters, their legs were sliced open with glass or wood before the doctors introduced bacteria and test medicine. If the wounds did not heal, they later found out that it would result in execution. The four survived and lived to write the letters.

Once a month, prisoners were allowed to write letters to their families. These messages were monitored by the guards. The women wrote a message in visible ink, and then in between the lines, they wrote in their own urine. This worked as a version of invisible ink. When held over a heat source or ironed, the message would appear. Cyż communicated this with her brother by referring to a children's book. It instructed him to look for a message using the first letter of every line. It spelled out: "list modem" which translates to "letter in urine". From there the women delivered intelligence about the medical experiments. In 1943, one of the many letters read "Further details of operations. Up to 16 January 1943, 70 people in total have been operated on. From this, 56 from the Lublin September transport, of which 36 were infection operations (without incision), 20 bone operations. ... In bone operations, each cut is reopened. Bones are operated on both legs or just one." and "We are worried that they will want to get rid of the ones who have been operated on as living proof. Bear in mind that in the course of 20 months about a quarter of all the Polish women from political transports have been shot. On 30 April, five more were shot under the guise of being sent to Oświęcim." Not only did they detail medical experiments but brothel work as well. These letters and their information made their way into the Polish Underground, the International Red Cross, the Vatican, and the Polish government-in-exile in London. Eventually, these letters would be used as evidence for the trials. These artifacts give records and witness accounts from Ravensbrück and are now being preserved.

When Ravensbrück was liberated a note was found on the body of a dead girl. It read as follows:

"O Lord, remember, not only the men and women of good will, but also those of ill will.

But do not remember all the suffering they have inflicted on us; remember the fruits we have borne, thanks to this suffering:

our comradeship, our loyalty, our humility, our courage, our generosity, the greatness of heart which has grown out of all this,

and when they come to judgement, let all the fruits we have borne be their forgiveness."

== See also ==
- List of Nazi concentration camps
- Hamburg Ravensbrück trials
- Holocaust memorial landscapes in Germany
- International Ravensbrück Committee
- White Buses
- If This Is a Woman by Sarah Helm
- Across the Lake: A Novel of the Holocaust and Ravensbrück, Patrick Hicks
