= Johanna Bormann =

Nazi concentration camp guard

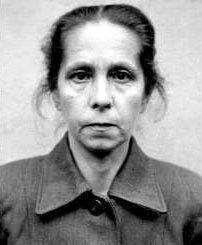
- Mugshot of Bormann in August 1945, while she was awaiting trial
- Born: 10 September 1893; Birkenfelde, Prussia, German Empire
- Died: 13 December 1945 (aged 52); Hamelin, Schaumburg-Lippe, Germany
- Status: Executed by hanging
- Conviction: War crimes
- Trial: Belsen trial
- Penalty: Death

Johanna Bormann (10 September 1893 – 13 December 1945) was a German prison guard at several Nazi concentration camps from 1938. She was executed as a war criminal at Hamelin after a court trial in 1945.

== Early life ==
Bormann was born on 10 September 1893 in Birkenfelde, East Prussia. Not much is known about her early life, but she was raised in the Catholic faith. She had briefly pursued a career as a missionary for Deutsche Mission.

== Career, trial and execution ==
At her trial, Bormann said she had joined the Auxiliary SS, on 1 March 1938, as a civilian employee. "to earn more money". She first served at the Lichtenburg concentration camp in Saxony under SS Oberaufseherin Jane Bernigau. She worked in the camp kitchens.

In 1939, she was assigned to oversee a work crew at the new Ravensbrück women's camp near Berlin. In March 1942, Bormann was one of a handful of women selected for guard duty at Auschwitz in occupied Poland. Short in stature, she was known for her cruelty. Victims called her "Wiesel" (weasel) and "the woman with the dogs". She was also known to sing Nazi songs.

In October 1942, Bormann went to Auschwitz-Birkenau as an Aufseherin (female guard). Her supervisors included Maria Mandl, Margot Dreschel and Irma Grese. Bormann was moved to Budy, a nearby subcamp, where she was chief overseer.

In 1944, as German losses mounted, Bormann was transferred to the auxiliary camp at Hindenburg (present-day Zabrze, Poland) in Silesia. In January 1944 she returned to Ravensbrück. In March 1944 she arrived at her last post Bergen-Belsen, near Celle, where she served under Josef Kramer, Irma Grese and Elisabeth Volkenrath (all of whom had served with her in Birkenau). When leaving Bergen-Belsen, she had packed a suitcase with her belongings and stolen jewellery and money. On 15 April 1945 the British Army took Bergen-Belsen, finding over 10,000 corpses and 60,000 survivors.

Bormann was later incarcerated and interrogated by the British, then prosecuted at the Belsen Trial, which lasted from 17 September 1945 to 17 November 1945. The court heard testimony relating to murders she had committed at Auschwitz and Belsen sometimes unleashing her "big bad wolfhound" German Shepherd on helpless prisoners. She denied all of the charges, only admitting to slapping prisoners with her hands to discipline them.

She was found guilty and hanged (along with Grese and Volkenrath) on 13 December 1945. Her executioner was Albert Pierrepoint.
