= Female guards in Nazi concentration camps =

Female retinue of the SS
- Weibliches Gefolge der SS (SS-Gefolge)
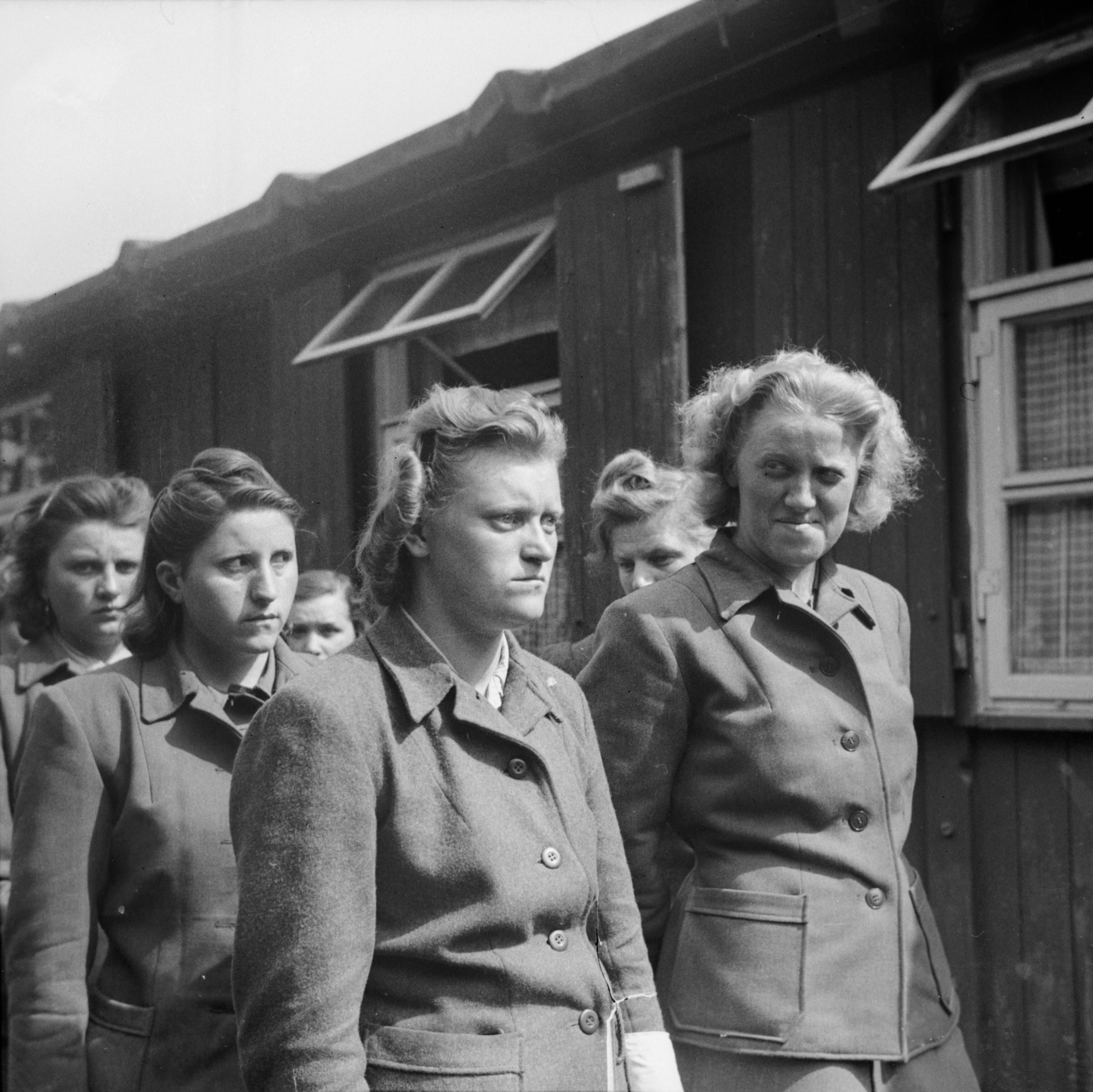
- Aufseherinnen being escorted to bury deceased prisoners in mass graves following the liberation of Bergen-Belsen (19 April 1945)

Agency overview
- Formed: 1938
- Dissolved: 1945
- Type: Auxiliary organization
- Jurisdiction: Nazi Germany
- Employees: Approximately 3,500
- Parent agency: Schutzstaffel; SS-Totenkopfverbände

SS-Aufseherin (pl. SS-Aufseherinnen; German: [ˈaʊ̯fˌzeːəʁɪn]; lit. 'female SS overseer' (Note: Helferin (pl. Helferinnen), which means "female helper", is not synonymous with the position title Aufseherin.)) was the position title for a female guard in Nazi concentration and extermination camps. Female camp personnel were members of the SS-Gefolge auxiliary organization, which served the SS-Totenkopfverbände (SS-TV) in a limited capacity as these women were not formally recognized as members of the Schutzstaffel (SS).

== Background ==
In April 1933, a workhouse in Moringen was made into a detention facility under Hanover administration. In November of that year, 141 women, the majority of whom were suspected or confirmed Communists, were imprisoned there. Prisoners usually stayed in Moringen for a few weeks before being released. The facility did not become one associated with reports of mistreatment, and group discussions were held daily to "re-educate". The facility closed in March 1938, and was replaced by the Lichtenburg concentration camp, which opened in Saxony in late 1937, and became known as the first SS-run women's concentration camp. It was commanded by SS-Hauptsturmführer Max Koegel and staffed by recruited and conscripted women who worked as guards.

Reichsführer-SS Heinrich Himmler directed the construction of a larger second women's concentration camp in November 1938, after Lichtenburg's limited capacity had become an issue due to a rising number of arrests. Ravensbrück commenced operations in May 1939, serving as the central camp for female prisoners. It was here that the position of SS-Aufseherin was established.

On 1 September 1939, Hitler delivered a speech at the Reichstag, in which he stated: "I expect every German woman to integrate herself into the great community-in-struggle in an exemplary fashion and with iron discipline!". (Note: Domarus 1997, p. 1756) This was the given order despite the views he held in regards to women:

Women have the talent, which is unknown to us males, for giving a kiss to a woman-friend and at the same time piercing her heart with a well-sharpened stiletto. To wish to change women in this respect would be ingenuous: women are what they are. Let's come to terms with their little weaknesses…I prefer to see them thus occupied than devoting themselves to metaphysics. There's no worse disaster than to see them grappling with ideas.

— Adolf Hitler, Hitler's Table Talk (1942) (Note: Trevor-Roper 2008, p. 266)

The Bund Deutscher Mädel (BDM) was in support of the 1939 speech and had it written in the organization's 1940 yearbook.

== Recruitment and conscription ==
Advertisements were posted in newspapers, such as the Hannoverscher Kurier, which sought out German women between the ages of 20 and 40 to guard women who "committed an offense against the 'Volk community" at a "military installation". For women seeking employment or a higher pay, the job offer was enticing because of the free housing, prepared meals, and the absence of required qualifications. Although a small number of newspaper clippings have survived after the war, history professor Jack G. Morrison claims that the advertisements neglected to mention concentration camps.

In December 1942, the age range of 20–40 broadened and became 17–45 as tensions grew with the advancement of Allied forces and the Oberkommando der Wehrmacht's loss in the Battle of Stalingrad. During this time, many women were recruited by the labor office, which became a source of contention in postwar testimonies. Johanna Langefeld, who was an Oberaufseherin at numerous concentration camps, stated in her testimony: "There were also cases in which women were sent by one of the labor offices to work as guards at Ravensbrück. This happened most often to women who had refused once or even twice to take the job that had been assigned to them, which meant they were likely to be arrested the next time they refused to take the work assigned to them".

The need for female guards in concentration camps became critical when Reichsleiter Joseph Goebbels declared total war against Allied forces in his Sportpalast speech on 18 February 1943. (Note: Longerich 2015, p. 559) Hitler raised the age limit for women's involvement to 50 and made employment in military equipment production mandatory in his 1943 and 1944 decrees pertaining to both male and female participation in the defense of the Reich. The 1943 order exempted individuals who worked at least 48 hours a week, employers of at least five workers, those working in agriculture or health services, pregnant women, and women with one child under the age of six or two children under the age of 14. Despite these measures, only a small number of women voluntarily sought out such work, resulting in an increase in SS recruiting and labor office conscriptions. (Note: Broszat 1996, p. 178)

== Acclimatisation and training ==
When the Nazi Party realized that Nazi Germany was losing the war, concentration camp personnel destroyed many records, leaving little information regarding how Aufseherinnen were trained. Ravensbrück has the most preserved records on training practices, largely due to its role as the primary training camp for women from 1942 to 1945.

Upon arrival at Ravensbrück, the recruited and conscripted women were made to sign a slew of documents, including a declaration of confidentiality, a vow not to reprimand prisoners physically or verbally, and an oath of loyalty to Hitler and their superiors. The women were then led to their on-camp quarters. The ensuing training period lasted anywhere from one to six weeks, but as Aufseherin prospects were brought in at an increasing rate, this range decreased to just one week for some women. In June 1942, conscripted Aufseherin Anna David (Note: Sulej 2020, p. 180) provided testimony of her arrival at Ravensbrück:

At the very beginning, we were issued a uniform and had to give an oath. They instructed us on methods for dealing with prisoners. We were told that escape attempts must be prevented at any cost, and that we were to report even the smallest violation on the part of the prisoners…During the training course, every graduate had to take part in various duties, and learn how to carry them out in accordance with camp regulations.

A three-month probationary period follows training, during which each prospective is partnered with an experienced Aufseherin who acts as a mentor and is tasked with overseeing a work detail. (Note: This aspect of the training program was only implemented in 1939.) In 1939, Hermine Braunsteiner received mentoring from Maria Mandl, who was then the Oberaufseherin of Ravensbrück. In a postwar testimony, Braunsteiner states that all Aufseherinnen were taught how to "handle, shoot, and clean their service weapon".

According to Commandant's Order No. 3, issued 24 July 1942, new Aufseherinnen received ideological training every Saturday between five and six o'clock in the evening. As part of the curriculum, two antisemitic Nazi propaganda films were shown, including Jud Süß.

== Membership ==
Due to missing and destroyed documentation pre-liberation, the exact number of women who became Aufseherinnen between 1938 and 1945 has been disputed. Based on published literature and surviving evidence from numerous concentration camps, it is estimated that 3,500 women served as guards. (Note: Wachsmann 2015, p. 544) Historian Bernhard Strebel has further broken down this figure, estimating that 313 women were employed at Ravensbrück as camp personnel in late 1942 from payroll records. By late 1944, the total surpassed 3,000.

== Ranks and uniforms ==
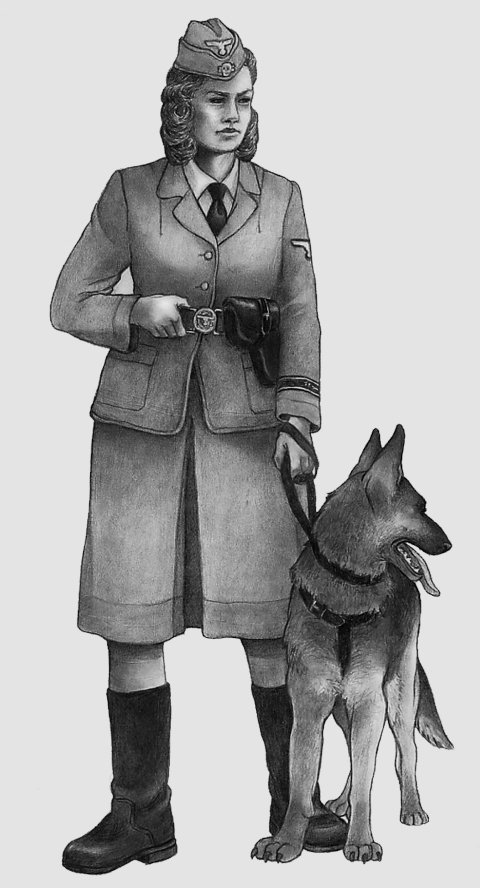
Artistic depiction of an Aufseherin uniform

Braunsteiner has claimed that the first group of women assigned to Ravensbrück were only given blue smocks to wear. About a year later, prototype uniforms were supplied. In the first design, a light gray loden cloth jacket and culottes were worn with a blue blouse, black boots, and a light gray side cap. Only after Himmler's visit to Ravensbrück in the spring of 1940 did Aufseherinnen receive standardized uniforms. Two military gray uniforms, one for winter and one for summer, were provided, together with two pairs of boots, blouses, a cap, and sportswear. (Note: Mailänder 2015, p. 100) Hats and jewelry were prohibited, with the exception of the designated side cap or a straw hat on hot days. (Note: Füllberg Stolberg 1994, p. 224)

To denote rank, uniforms displayed aluminium braiding on the shoulders and sleeves, as well as badges and awards such as the War Merit Medal Second Class.

=== Aufseherin ===
Aufseherin means "female overseer". Aufseherinnen were in charge of conducting the daily roll call, or appellplatz, allocating inmates to work details, and guarding prisoners.

Name	History	Years of service	Ref
1 bar
Jenny-Wanda Barkmann	Aufseherin at Stutthof	1944–1945	(Note: Wynn 2020, p. 137)
Erna Beilhardt	Aufseherin at the Heiligenbeil subcamp of Stutthof	1944–1945	(Note: Megargee 2009, p. 1459)
Erika Bergmann	Aufseherin at Ravensbrück and its Genthin subcamp, and the Neurohlau subcamp of Flossenbürg	1943–1945	(Note: Nick 2019, p. 294)
Johanna Bormann	Aufseherin at Lichtenburg, Ravensbrück, Auschwitz II-Birkenau and its subcamp Hindenburg, and Bergen-Belsen	1939–1945	(Note: Benz & Distel 2007, p. 181)
Hermine Böttcher Brückner	Aufseherin at Ravensbrück and Majdanek.	1942–1945	
Herta Bothe	Aufseherin at Ravensbrück, Stutthof and its Bromberg-Ost subcamp, Auschwitz, and Bergen-Belsen	1942–1945	
Irene Haschke	Aufseherin at Gross-Rosen and its subcamp Mährisch-Weißwasser, and Bergen-Belsen	1944–1945	(Note: Álvarez 2012, p. 294)
Ruth Elfriede Hildner	Aufseherin at Ravensbrück, Dachau, and the Helmbrechts subcamp of Flossenbürg	1944–1945	(Note: Álvarez 2012, p. 291)
Anneliese Kohlmann	Aufseherin at the Neuengamme subcamps Neugraben and Hamburg-Tiefstack, and Bergen-Belsen	1944–1945	(Note: Buggeln 2015, p. 243)
Hildegard Lächert	Aufseherin at Majdanek, Auschwitz, Bolzano, and Mauthausen-Gusen	1942–1945	(Note: Álvarez 2012, pp. 268–270)
Ewa Paradies	Aufseherin at Stutthof and its subcamp Bromberg-Ost	1944–1945	(Note: Álvarez 2012, p. 287)
Margarete Rabe	Aufseherin at Ravensbrück and its Uckermark subcamp	1944-1945	
Erna Wallisch	Aufseherin at Ravensbrück and Majdanek	1940-1945	(Note: Mailänder 2015, p. 137)

=== Hundeführerin ===
Hundeführerin means "female dog handler". There is little documentation on female dog handlers in concentration camps, with the only known name being that of Elfriede Rinkel, though it is assumed that they had similar training and responsibilities to their male counterparts. Himmler allegedly ordered for Aufseherinnen to not carry guns, though this is refuted by Braunsteiner's testimony, so some women were armed with German shepherds who Himmler demanded to be "trained to savage to death anyone except their handler". (Note: O'Reilly & Dugard 2018, p. 241)

Name	History	Years of service	Ref
1 bar with star
Elfriede Rinkel	Hundeführerin at Ravensbrück	1944–1945	(Note: Nick 2019, p. 297)

=== Kommandoführerin ===
Kommandoführerin means "commanding officer", though the women with this title were just in charge of overseeing certain work details in a concentration camp. (Note: Długoborski & Piper 1995, p. 283)

Name	History	Years of service	Ref
1 bar with star
Alice Orlowski	Aufseherin at Ravensbrück and Majdanek; Kommandoführerin at Majdanek, Plaszow-Kraków, and Auschwitz II-Birkenau	1941–1945	

=== Blockführerin ===
Blockführerin and blockleiter means "block leader". The terms blockälteste, meaning "block senior" and blockova were the titles given to prisoners if they, like the appointed blockführerin, were put in charge of maintaining order within their respective block. (Note: Hore 2016, p. 147)

Name	History	Years of service	Ref
1 bar with star
Ulla Jürß	Aufseherin and Blockführerin at Ravensbrück	c. 1942–1944	(Note: Brown 2002, p. 129)
Elisabeth Lupka	Aufseherin at Ravensbrück; Blockführerin at Auschwitz II-Birkenau	1943–1945	

=== Arbeitsdienstführerin ===
Arbeitsdienstführerin means "labor service leader". These women were in charge of assigning work details amongst the prisoners, maintaining efficiency within the concentration camp, and overseeing kommandoführerinnen. (Note: Posner 2000, p. 219)

Name	History	Years of service	Ref
1 bar with star
Greta Bösel	Arbeitsdienstführerin at Ravensbrück	1944–1945	(Note: Hördler 2015, p. 413)
Elisabeth Hasse	Kommandoführerin at the Auschwitz subcamps of Budy and Rajsko; Arbeitsdienstführerin at Auschwitz II-Birkenau	c. 1942–1945	(Note: Megargee 2009, p. 233)
Hilde Lobauer	Arbeitsdienstführerin at Auschwitz II-Birkenau and Bergen-Belsen	1944–1945	(Note: United Nations War Crimes Commission 1947, pp. 274–277)

=== Rapportführerin ===
Rapportführerin means "report leader". Rapportführerinnen coordinated daily schedules and work schedules from an office within the camp and received reports from other guards regarding any incidents, illnesses, and deaths.

Name	History	Years of service	Ref
1 bar with star
Irma Grese	Aufseherin at Ravensbrück, Oberaufseherin Auschwitz II-Birkenau, Arbeitsdienstführerin and Rapportführerin in Bergen-Belsen	1942–1945	

=== Erstaufseherin ===
Erstaufseherin means "first supervisor".

Name	History	Years of service	Ref
Therese Brandl	Aufseherin at the Dachau subcamp Mühldorf, Rapportführerin at Ravensbrück and Auschwitz I, Erstaufseherin at Auschwitz II-Birkenau	1940–1945	(Note: Álvarez 2012, p. 309)

=== Oberaufseherin ===
Oberaufseherin means "head female overseer". Oberaufseherinnen were responsible for directing and supervising Aufseherinnen and reporting roll-call numbers to camp headquarters. In some camps, this position was equivalent to that of a Schutzhaftlagerführerin.

Name	History	Years of service	Ref
3 aluminum stripes, 9mm aluminum collar braid; upper edge of hat has a silver-gray braid
Jane Bernigau	Aufseherin at Lichtenburg and Ravensbrück; Oberaufseherin at Gross-Rosen	1938–1945	
Dorothea Binz	Aufseherin and Oberaufseherin at Ravensbrück	1939–1945	(Note: Álvarez 2012, p. 150)
Hermine Braunsteiner	Aufseherin at Ravensbrück and Majdanek; Oberaufseherin at the Genthin subcamp of Ravensbrück	1939–1945	(Note: Wynn 2020, pp. 133–135)
Gertrud Heise	Aufseherin at Ravensbrück, Majdanek, Kraków-Płaszów, Auschwitz II-Birkenau, and Neuengamme; Kommandoführerin at the Obernheide subcamp; Oberaufseherin at the Obernheide subcamp of Neuengamme	1941–1945	(Note: Megargee 2009, p. 1097)
Johanna Langefeld	Aufseherin at Lichtenburg; Oberaufseherin at Lichtenburg, Ravensbrück and Auschwitz	1936–1945	(Note: Herbermann 2000, p. 125)
Hildegard Neumann	Oberaufseherin at Ravensbrück and Theresienstadt	1944–1945	(Note: Álvarez 2012, p. 261)
Gerda Steinhoff	Blockführerin at Stutthof and Oberaufseherinat its subcamps Danzig–Holm and Bromberg-Ost	1944–1945	(Note: Álvarez 2012, p. 265)
Elisabeth Volkenrath	Oberaufseherin at Auschwitz II-Birkenau and Bergen-Belsen	1941–1945	
Emma Zimmer	Aufseherin at Lichtenburg; Oberaufseherin at Ravensbrück and Auschwitz II-Birkenau	1938–1945	(Note: Herbermann 2000, p. 195)

=== Chef Oberaufseherin ===
Oberaufseherin means "female chief senior overseer".

Name	History	Years of service	Ref
Margarete Gallinat	Chef Oberaufseherin at Herzogenbusch	1940–1945	(Note: Schwartz 2018, p. 100)
Anna Klein	Chef Oberaufseherin at Ravensbrück	1939–1945	(Note: Brown 2002, p. 139)

=== Schutzhaftlagerführerin ===
Schutzhaftlagerführerin, commonly shortened in literature as Lagerführerin, means "camp leader". Lagerführerinnen dealt with affairs concerning the prisoners at the concentration camp, coordinated with the Labor Squad office to appoint work details to prisoners, and worked closely with the subordinate Oberaufseherinnen.

Name	History	Years of service	Ref
Luise Danz	Aufseherin at Ravensbrück, Majdanek, Kraków-Płaszów, Auschwitz II-Birkenau, and the Malchow subcamp of Ravensbrück; Kommandoführerin and Rapportführerin at Auschwitz II-Birkenau; Oberaufseherin at Malchow; Lagerführerin at Auschwitz II-Birkenau, Camps B and C	1943–1945	(Note: Hellinger & Lee 2022, p. 207) (Note: Hellinger & Lee 2022, p. 243)
Else "Elsa" Ehrich	Lagerführerin at Majdanek	1940–1945	
Maria Mandl	Aufseherin at Lichtenburg, Oberaufseherin at Ravensbrück, Lagerführerin at Auschwitz II-Birkenau	1938–1945	
Ruth Neudeck	Aufseherin and Blockführerin at Ravensbrück; Oberaufseherin at Uckermark; Lagerführerin at the Barth subcamp of Ravensbrück	1944–1945	(Note: Heath 2018, p. 204)
Erna Petermann	Lagerführerin at Gross-Rosen	1944–1945	(Note: Rudorff 2018, p. 706)
Lotte Toberentz	Lagerführerin at Ravensbrück	1942–1945	(Note: Schwarze 2009, p. 109)

== Daily life ==
=== Housing ===
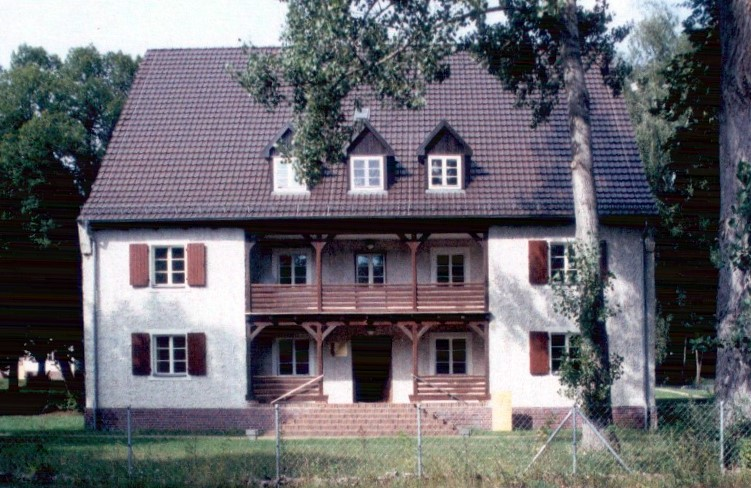
Ravensbrück residential building (2005)

Aufseherinnen were housed at Ravensbrück based on their rank. Since personal and intimate contact with the opposite sex was prohibited, the eight apartments on the campgrounds were all far from the men's quarters. Only young and unmarried guards were placed in these apartments, each of which were two stories with ten bedrooms and four attic rooms. Each building is believed to have held at least 112 women. Private housing arrangements were made for married women and mothers. Despite the policy that male and female camp personnel be separated on camp grounds, it remained a problem, with Oberaufseherinnen Maria Mandl and Dorothea Binz engaging in their own liaisons while employed there.

=== Recreation ===
Aufseherinnen were allowed to leave Ravensbrück only on specific days and with a curfew of 11 P.M., which a number of them ignored. During the spring and summer, the women frequented movie theaters, pubs, and festivals. If they remained in campgrounds, free time was spent sewing or getting their hair done at the prisoner-run salon. (Note: Mailänder 2015, pp. 90, 104)

The women did not have to do their own laundry, cleaning, or cooking as prisoners were made to do it for them. Some Aufseherinnen considered this a luxury. Herta Ehlert stated in her postwar testimony: "Well, I want to be quite honest, I had never such a good life as in the beginning at Ravensbrück when I arrived".

== Trials and sentences ==
=== Majdanek trials ===
We were no longer human. Commands were always given. […] We were not allowed to speak with each other or the prisoners. We had to work whether it was raining or snowing, whether it was cold or hot. Imagine yourself standing in a storm for twelve hours and losing everything.

— Hildegard Lächert, 1984

Elsa Ehrich was the first and only woman to face a death sentence in the second Majdanek trial, which took place between 1946 and 1948. (Note: Gigliotti & Tempian 2016, p. 189) (Note: Marszałek 1986, p. 188) Between 1975 and 1981, Alice Orlowski, Hermine Braunsteiner (life imprisonment), Hildegard Lächert (12 years imprisonment), (Note: Marszałek 1986, p. 190) and Hermine Böttcher Brückner (acquitted and released) (Note: Marszałek 1986, p. 189) appeared in court for the third trial.

Orlowski died of natural causes during court proceedings, (Note: Álvarez 2012, p. 302) but had first been tried in the 1947 Kraków Auschwitz trial and received a sentence of 15 years in prison. Witnesses identified Braunsteiner based on the War Merit Medal, which she wore every day on her jacket while working at the Majdanek camp. Conversely, Böttcher Brückner was pinned by survivors at the Majdanek trial as being "good" and "humane", in comparison to other Aufseherinnen, though she had struck the prisoners from time to time. (Note: Mailänder 2015, pp. 237–238)

=== Belsen trials ===
The first Belsen trial took place in 1945, in which Irma Grese, Elisabeth Volkenrath, and Johanna Bormann received a sentence of death by hanging. Herta Bothe, Hilde Lobauer, and Irene Haschke received prison sentences of ten years, while Herta Ehlert received 15 years. (Note: United Nations War Crimes Commission 1947, p. 125) Gertrud Heise and Anneliese Kohlmann were only sentenced the following year during the second Belsen trial, receiving 15 years and two years' imprisonment, respectively. (Note: Brown 2002, p. 247)

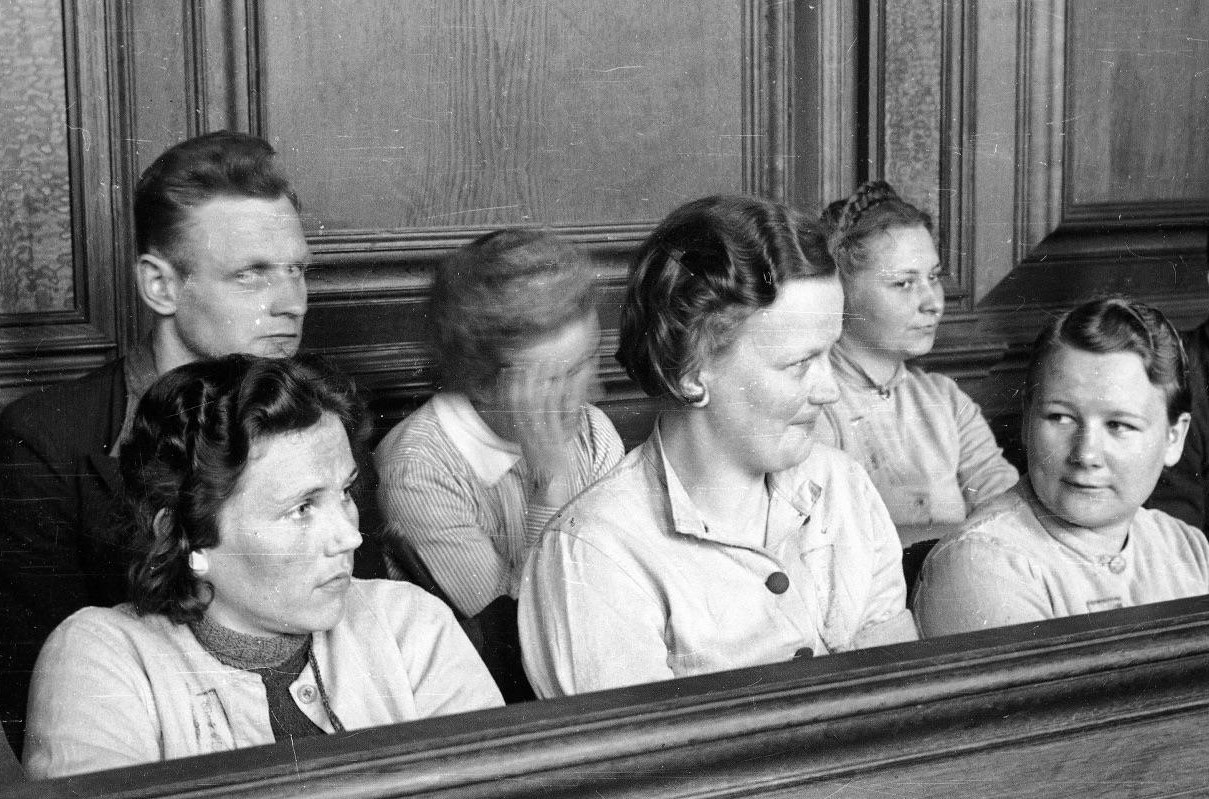
Row 1, left to right: Becker, Steinhoff, Klaff; Row 2: Beilhardt, Barkmann (April/May 1946)

=== Stutthof trials ===
Jenny-Wanda Barkmann, Elisabeth Becker, Wanda Klaff, Ewa Paradies, and Gerda Steinhoff all received a sentence of death by hanging in the first Stuffhof trial, which took place Gdańsk, Poland in 1946. Erna Beilhardt had been the only woman to not receive a death sentence, having only received five years in prison.

=== Kraków Auschwitz trial ===
The 1947 Auschwitz trial in Kraków, Poland sentenced Maria Mandl (Note: Eischeid 2024, pp. 265–266) and Therese Brandl to death by hanging. Luise Danz was sentenced to life in prison. Alice Orlowski and Hildegard Lächert were sentenced to 15 years in prison.

== Aftermath ==
=== Perpetrators after the war ===
One of the few former Aufseherinnen to tell her story to the public was Hertha Bothe, who had been employed at Ravensbrück in 1942, then at Stutthof and its Bromberg-Ost subcamp, Auschwitz, and Bergen-Belsen. She was given early release in the mid-1950s from her ten-year prison sentence. In an interview recorded in 1999, Bothe was asked if she regretted being a concentration camp guard. She replied, "Did I make a mistake? No. The mistake was that it was a concentration camp, but I had to go. Otherwise, I would have been put into it myself; that was my mistake". Though Bothe claimed that refusal of the job would have resulted in her own arrest—an explanation given by many former Aufseherinnen—it was unlikely to have been true, as surviving records have shown that the new recruits refusing to remain as guards in Ravensbrück did not face consequences.

Former Ravensbrück Hundeführerin Elfriede Rinkel was 84 and living in San Francisco when she was deported to Germany by the U.S. Justice Department in August 2006. She kept her participation in the Nazi Party a secret from her family, friends, and Jewish-German husband of 42 years, Fred. She had emigrated to the United States in 1959 in search of a better life, and had omitted Ravensbrück from the list of residences on her visa application. Rinkel ultimately faced no criminal charges in Germany, as the statute of limitations had expired. The case continued to be examined until her death in 2018.

== See also ==
- SS-Totenkopfverbände concentration camp personnel
- SS-Helferinnenkorps - formation of female communications and clerical personnel
