= Emma Zimmer =

Concentration camp overseer

- Zimmer in British military custody
- Born: 14 August 1888; Haßmersheim, Grand Duchy of Baden, German Empire
- Died: 20 September 1948 (aged 60); Hamelin Prison, Allied-occupied Germany
- Occupation: Overseer
- Political party: Nazism
- Status: Executed by hanging
- Conviction: War crimes
- Trial: Hamburg Ravensbrück trials
- Penalty: Death

Emma Anna Maria Zimmer (née Mezel; 14 August 1888 – 20 September 1948) was an overseer at the Lichtenburg concentration camp, the Ravensbrück concentration camp and the Auschwitz-Birkenau extermination/concentration camp for several years during the Second World War.

== Life ==
Mezel was born in Haßmersheim, in what was then the Grand Duchy of Baden, and was the eldest child of pharmacist Oscar Mezel and his wife Maria, née Lang. In 1938 she became a guard at the Lichtenburg early concentration camp, where she became assistant camp leader under Johanna Langefeld. She worked alongside Maria Mandl, who became a top-ranking official at the Auschwitz-Birkenau extermination camp.

In 1939 Zimmer was assigned to the Ravensbrück concentration camp, where she served as assistant chief leader, then in October 1942 she became assistant camp leader at Auschwitz II (Birkenau) as an SS-Stellvertretende Oberaufseherin.

On 1 June 1943, a month before her 55th birthday, she was granted permission to stay on staff as an overseer at Ravensbrück, despite her age. She was one of the first chief woman officers at Ravensbrück from 1939 to 1941 and took an active part in the selection of internees to be gassed during 1941 at the Bernburg Euthanasia Centre near Berlin.

Zimmer served as a guard at Ravensbrück and was known in the camp for being brutal and sadistic in her duties, often dealing out corporal punishment. She reportedly "liked to slap", "lashed out with her jackboots" and "walked up and down the ranks carrying a large document file, with which she would beat inmates about the head for the slightest movement or sound". Zimmer referred to prisoners as “bitches” and “dirty cows” who needed to be put into their place and "abused and bullied them in an extreme way."

At Auschwitz she was particularly feared: "Our supervisor was an old and mean SS-woman called Emma Zimmer. She was vicious and dangerous and frightening us constantly with threats, proclaiming in a sadistic voice, ‘I will report you and then you will go away, you know where? Just one way-up the chimney.’ We hated her and were scared of her."

She was awarded the War Merit Cross Second Class without swords for her long service in the SS.

== Death ==
Zimmer stood trial at the seventh Ravensbrück Trial and was sentenced to death for her war crimes. She was hanged by the British executioner Albert Pierrepoint on the gallows at Hamelin Prison on 20 September 1948, when she was 60 years old.

== See also ==
- Female guards in Nazi concentration camps
