= Herta Ehlert =

Guard of Nazi concentration camps

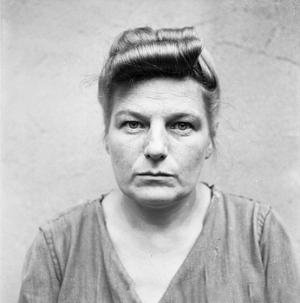
- Herta Ehlert in August 1945
- Born: 26 March 1905; Berlin, German Empire
- Died: 4 April 1997 (aged 92); Germany
- Occupation: Nazi concentration camp guard
- Organization: SS-Gefolge (Women's SS Division)
- Status: Deceased
- Motive: Nazism
- Conviction: War crimes
- Trial: Belsen trial
- Penalty: 15 years imprisonment; commuted to 12 years imprisonment

Herta Ehlert (née Liess; 26 March 1905 – 4 April 1997) was a female guard at many Nazi concentration camps during the Holocaust.

== During the war ==
Ehlert was working as a bakery assistant until she was called for Schutzstaffel (SS) work by the Labor Exchange on 15 November 1939. She maintained that she was a conscript when she began working as a "novice" at Ravensbrück concentration camp. She stated, "I had to see that civilian workers did not mix with the prisoners, and later on, I was detailed to working parties outside camp."

In October 1942, she was moved as an Aufseherin to the Majdanek camp near Lublin, Poland. She claimed she was moved as a punishment for being too nice to the prisoners, by not giving them harsh enough punishments and helping to feed them. However, according to the Belsen Trial, she had received a bonus, as well as better working conditions at this camp.

By mid-1944, she was transferred to Kraków-Płaszów concentration camp. Halina Nelken described Ehlert at Plaszow in these words: "immensely obese, sly, vicious in character, and an absolute master in using the whip. She was the overseer in charge of the kitchen. Through a small window, she would spy on the Jewish women while they were at work peeling potatoes or onions, washing dishes, and doing other chores necessary in the kitchen. Once, Ehlert even ordered the women who were at work to undress completely. After they had stripped, Ehlert searched each one extremely thoroughly, looking, no doubt, for rings, money, wrist watches, and other valuables. She remained at her job until the final liquidation of the Plaszów camp. She, too, was on the death march when the time came for us to retreat along with Germans." SS officers there noticed she was too lenient, polite and helpful to the prisoners, so the SS returned her to Ravensbrück to undergo another training course, this time by Dorothea Binz. During this time, Ehlert divorced her husband.

Ehlert was later moved to the Auschwitz concentration camp as an Aufseherin, where she oversaw women in Kommandos (slave labor groups). Ehlert later served as a guard at the Auschwitz subcamp in Rajsko, Poland, before she was transferred to the Bergen-Belsen concentration camp, where she became deputy wardress under Oberaufseherinnen Elisabeth Volkenrath and Irma Grese.

== Trials ==
When the British Army liberated the Belsen camp, Ehlert was arrested and tried at the Belsen Trial. She was defendant #8 during the trial. While on trial, Ehlert was asked if she had committed theft, witnessed severe beatings, had committed murder and so on, to which she had denied most accusations. Ehlert was remanded along with all 45 defendants, and pleaded not guilty to all charges. She was found guilty at Belsen and innocent at Oświęcim. Ehlert was sentenced to 15 years in prison. Her sentence was reduced to 12 years, and Ehlert was released early on 7 May 1953.

== After the war ==
After the war, she remarried and lived under the name Herta Naumann. She died in April 1997, aged 92.

== See also ==
- SS-Totenkopfverbände – Branch of the SS that managed the Nazi camps (1936–1945)
- Concentration Camps Inspectorate – SS administrative authority for concentration camps
- List of Nazi concentration camps
- Nuremberg principles – Guidelines for determining what constitutes a war crime
- Denazification – Allied initiative to remove Nazism
- Women in Nazi Germany – Nazi policies regarding the role of women in German society
