= Margot Dreschel =

Nazi concentration camp guard

Margot Drechsel
- Born: 17 May 1908; Neugersdorf, Saxony, German Empire
- Died: 28 May 1945 (aged 37); Bautzen, Allied-occupied Germany
- Cause of death: Execution by hanging
- Other names: Margot Drechsel, Margot Drechsler, Margot Drexler
- Occupation: SS-Aufseherin

Margot Elisabeth Drechsel, also spelled Drechsel, Drechsler or Drexler (17 May 1908 – 28 May 1945), was an SS-Aufseherin (concentration camp guard) at Nazi concentration camps during World War II. For her role in the Holocaust, she was sentenced to death and hanged.

== Ravensbrück concentration camp ==
Before her enlistment into the SS-Aufseherinnen, she worked at an office in Berlin. On 31 January 1941, Drechsel arrived at Ravensbrück concentration camp to receive guard training. She initially held the position Aufseherin at Ravensbrück, the basic role of a female guard, and was in charge of interned women. She trained under Oberaufseherin (Senior Overseer) Johanna Langefeld in 1941, and quickly became an SS-Rapportführerin (Report Overseer), a more senior guard.

== Auschwitz-Birkenau concentration camp ==
On 27 April 1942, Drechsel was selected for transfer to the newly opened Auschwitz II – Birkenau concentration camp in occupied Poland. Drechsel began her duties at Birkenau in August 1942 as soon as the women's camp was established there, with women transferred from Auschwitz to Birkenau during expansion. She served under Maria Mandl and worked as an associate of Josef Mengele.

Drechsel was head of all camp offices in Auschwitz. Her appearance was reportedly repellent, as one female Auschwitz prisoner recounted: "camp leader Drechsel was there, her buck teeth sticking out, even when her mouth is closed." Inmates described her as vulgar, thin and ugly. After the war, many survivors testified of her notoriously brutal beatings. She carried out indoor selections wearing a white coat and white gloves, disguised as a doctor.

Once Mrs Drechsel [Drechsel] came, with her huge bloodhound, undressed everybody, took away even our shoes, and we had to stand for hours completely naked, none of us were thinking of life any more, the gas chamber seemed unavoidable.

— War Crimes Trials. Protocol 3309, SS Female Overseers in Auschwitz

Drechsel regularly moved between the Auschwitz I camp and Birkenau, and involved herself in selections of women and children to be either exploited as slave labor, or murdered in the gas chambers. On 1 November 1944, she went to Flossenbürg concentration camp as an Oberaufseherin and as a trainer of enlisted overseers. In January 1945, she was moved back to the Ravensbrück subcamp at Neustadt-Glewe.

== Arrest and execution ==
Drechsel fled from Ravensbrück in April 1945 as Nazi Germany surrendered.

In May 1945, several former Auschwitz prisoners recognized her on a road from Pirna to Bautzen in the Soviet zone, and took her to the Soviet Military Police. The Soviets condemned her to death and executed her in May or June 1945 by hanging in Bautzen.

== See also ==
- Female guards in Nazi concentration camps
