= Hoheneck Fortress =

Former prison in Stollberg, Germany

Hoheneck
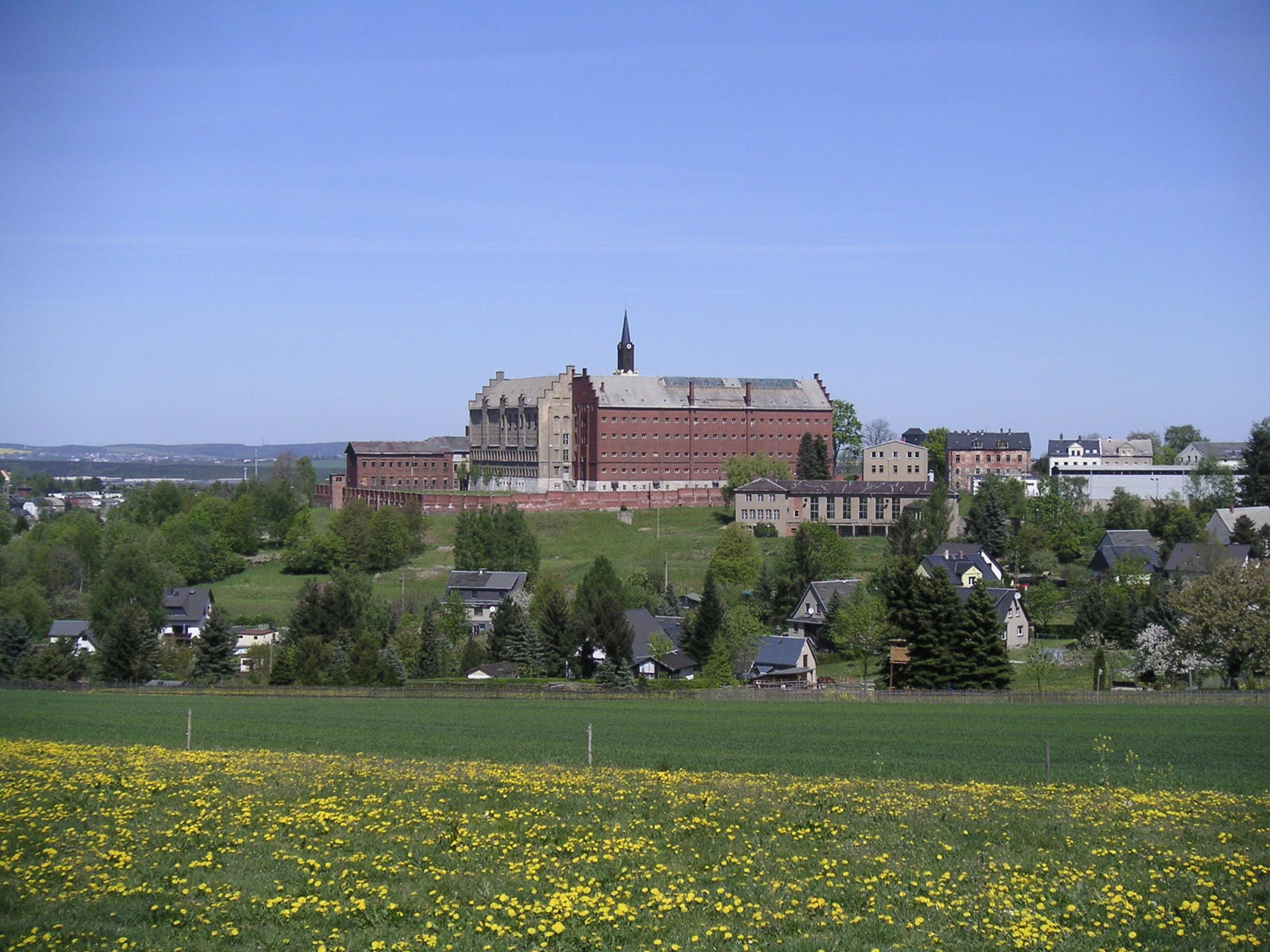
- Interactive map of Hoheneck
- Location: Stollberg, Saxony, Germany; 50°42′17″N 12°47′3″E
- Status: Closed
- Security class: Maximum
- Opened: 1862
- Closed: 2001
- Managed by: City of Stollberg

Hoheneck Women's Prison (German: Frauengefängnis Hoheneck) was a women's correctional facility in operation between 1862 and 2001 in Stollberg, Germany. It became most notable as a detention facility for female political prisoners in East Germany. The prison was designed to hold up to 600 inmates, however, as many as 1,600 were detained there.

The short film Broken: The Women’s Prison at Hoheneck examines forced labour in Hoheneck Prison.

== Notable inmates ==
- Erika Bergmann: Nazi war criminal and Ravensbrück concentration camp guard
- Ulla Jürß: Nazi war criminal and Ravensbrück concentration camp guard
- Erna Petri: Nazi war criminal
- Jutta Fleck: Attempted escapee from the German Democratic Republic
- Gabriele Stötzer: Experimental artist imprisoned for gathering signatures in protest of the expatriation of Wolf Biermann

== See also ==
- Berlin-Hohenschönhausen Memorial
- Memorial and Education Centre Andreasstrasse
