= Herta Bothe =

German concentration camp guard (1921–2000)

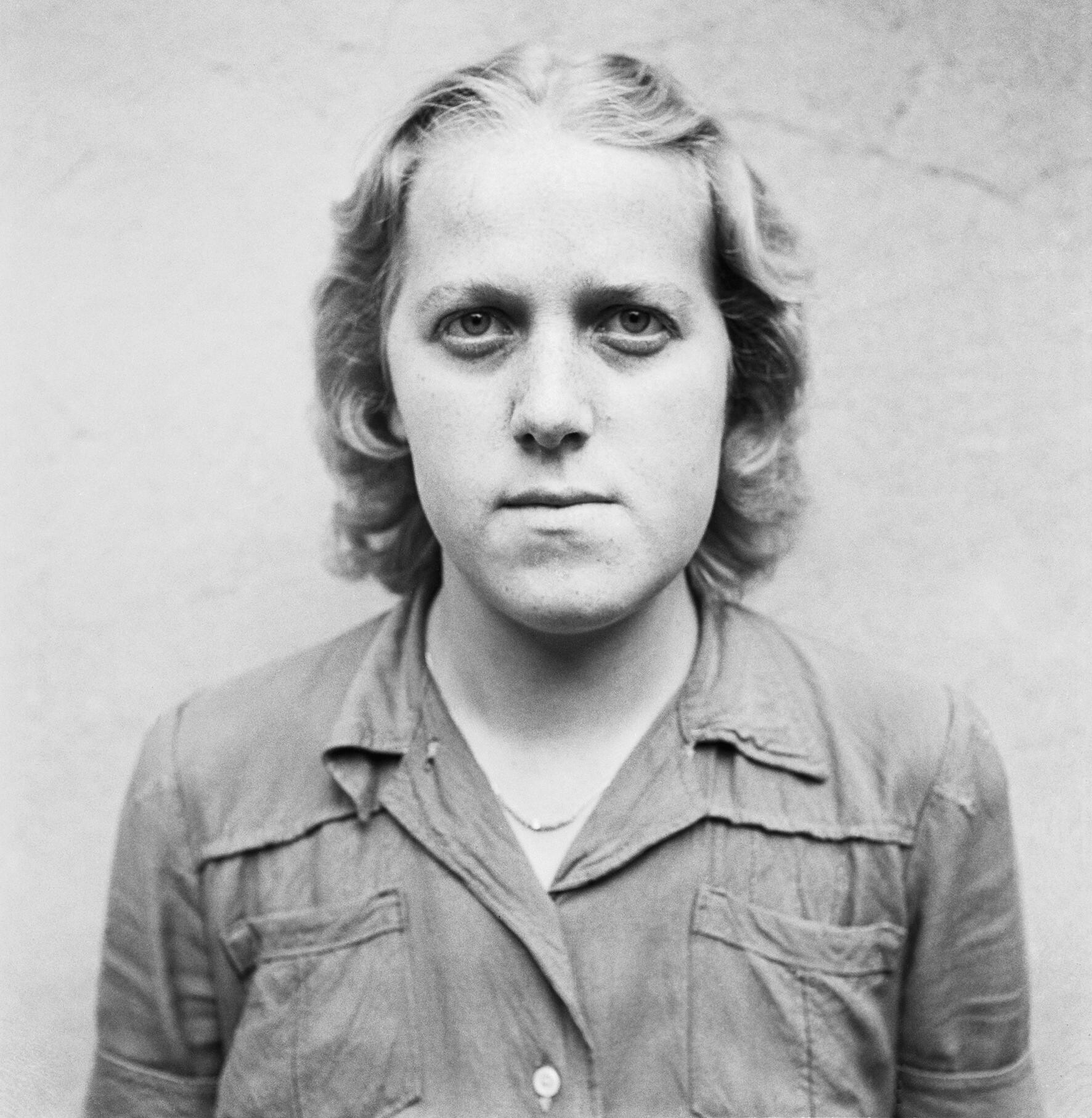
- Bothe awaiting trial in Celle (August 1945)
- Born: 3 January 1921; Teterow, Mecklenburg-Schwerin, Weimar Republic
- Died: 16 March 2000 (aged 79); Germany
- Status: Released
- Motive: Nazism
- Conviction: War crimes
- Trial: Belsen trial
- Penalty: 10 years imprisonment
- Military career
- Allegiance: Nazi Germany
- Branch: Schutzstaffel
- Service years: 1942–1945

Herta Bothe (3 January 1921 – 16 March 2000) was a German concentration camp guard during World War II. She was imprisoned for war crimes after the defeat of Nazi Germany, and was subsequently released early from prison on 22 December 1951.

== Biography ==
=== Early life ===
Herta Bothe was born on 3 January 1921 in Teterow, Mecklenburg-Schwerin. Her father was a woodworker. In 1938, at the age of seventeen, Bothe helped her father in his small Teterow wood shop, then worked temporarily in a factory, then as a hospital nurse. In 1939, Bothe was a member of the Bund Deutscher Mädel (League of German Girls).

=== Guard at Ravensbrück-Stutthof ===
In September 1942, Bothe became the SS-Aufseherin camp guard at the Nazi German Ravensbrück concentration camp for women. The former nurse took a four-week training course and was sent as an overseer to the Stutthof camp near Danzig (now Gdańsk). There she became known as the "Sadist of Stutthof" due to her brutal beatings of prisoners.

In July 1944, she was sent by Oberaufseherin Gerda Steinhoff to the Bromberg-Ost (Bromberg East) subcamp.

On 21 January 1945, the 24-year-old Bothe accompanied a death march of women prisoners from central Poland to the Bergen-Belsen concentration camp near Celle. While en route to Bergen-Belsen, she and the prisoners stayed temporarily at Auschwitz concentration camp, arriving at Belsen between 20–26 February 1945.

=== Guard at Bergen-Belsen ===
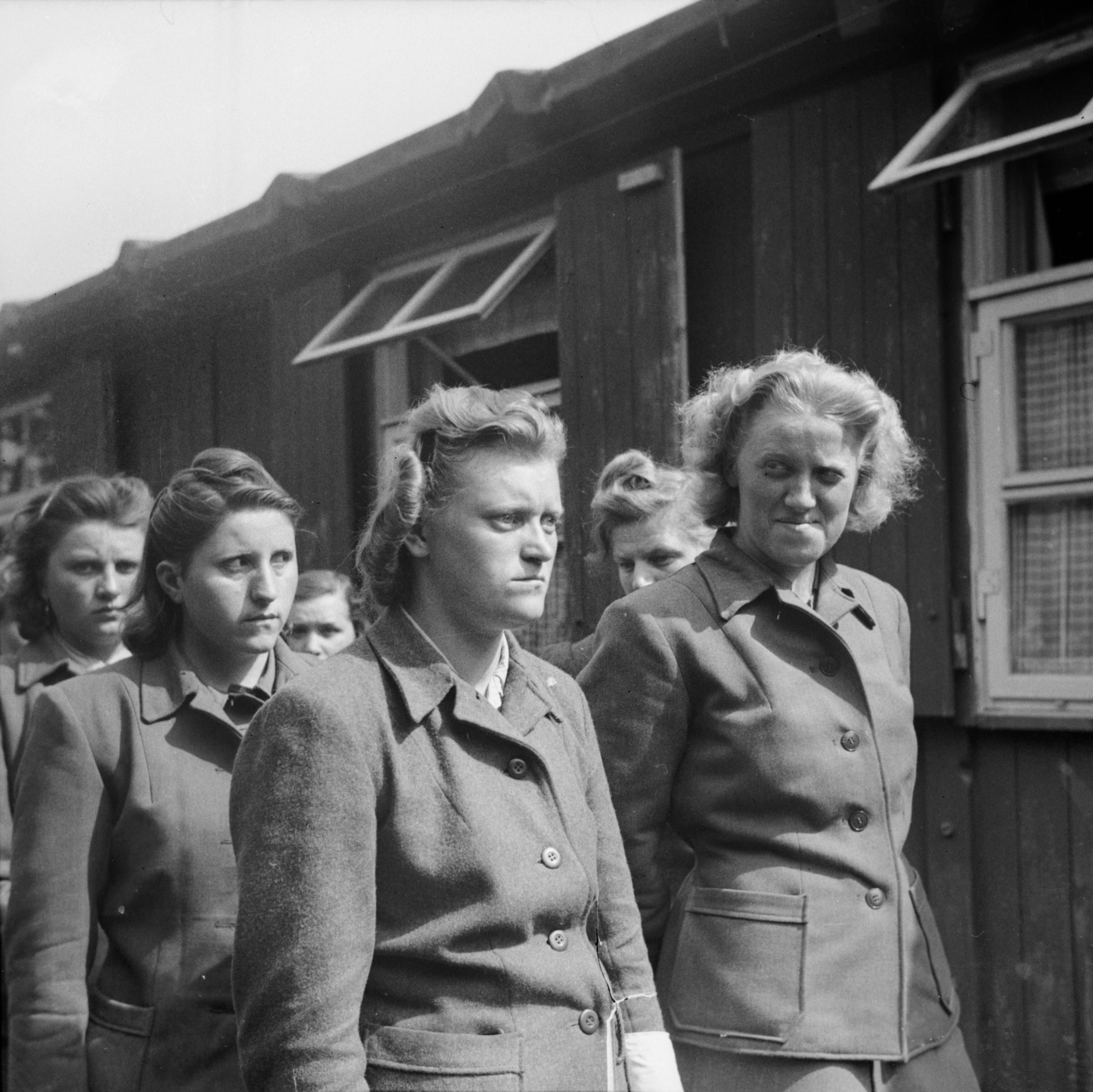
19 April 1945 Bergen-Belsen SS women camp guards are paraded for work in clearing the dead. The women include Hildegard Kanbach (first from left), Magdalene Kessel (second from left), Irene Haschke (centre, third from right), the Head Wardress, Herta Ehlert (second from right, partially hidden) and Herta Bothe (first from right). Herta Bothe (also known as Hertha Bothe) accompanied a death march of women from central Poland to Bergen-Belsen. She was sentenced to 10 years imprisonment and released early from prison on 22 December 1951. Elisabeth Volkenrath was head wardress of the camp and sentenced to death. She was hanged on 13 December 1945. Irene Haschke was sentenced to 10 years imprisonment.

Once in the camp Bothe supervised a group of sixty women prisoners who were conscripted to a wood cutting brigade. The camp was liberated by British forces on 15 April 1945 and Bothe was arrested.

=== Trial ===
She is said to have been the tallest woman arrested; she was 6 ft 3 in (191 cm) tall. Bothe also stood out from other Aufseherinnen because, while most of the SS women wore black jackboots, she was in ordinary civilian shoes. The Allied soldiers forced her to place corpses of dead prisoners into mass graves adjacent to the main camp. She recalled in an interview some 60 years later that, while carrying the corpses, they were not allowed to wear gloves, and she was terrified of contracting typhus. She said the dead bodies were so rotten that the arms and legs tore away when they were moved. She also recalled the emaciated bodies were still heavy enough to cause her considerable back pain. Bothe was arrested and taken to a prison at Celle.

At the Belsen Trial she was characterized as a "ruthless overseer" and sentenced to ten years in prison for using a pistol on prisoners. Bothe admitted to striking inmates with her hands for camp violations like stealing but maintained that she never beat anyone "with a stick or a rod" and added that she never "killed anyone." – Her contention of innocence was deemed questionable as one Bergen-Belsen survivor claimed to have witnessed Bothe beat a Hungarian Jew named Éva to death with a wooden block. Another teenage survivor named Wilhelm Grunwald stated that he saw her shoot two prisoners. He testified that "I saw several very weak prisoners carrying a food container from the kitchen block. As it was filled it was very heavy the women could not stand the weight and put it down to rest. At that moment I saw Bothe shoot at the two prisoners with her pistol. They fell down, but I cannot say if they were dead or wounded, but as they were very weak, thin and undernourished I have no doubt that they died."

After serving six years of her sentence, she was released early from prison on 22 December 1951.

=== Later life and death ===
During an interview that was recorded in 1999 but not broadcast until some years later, Bothe (living in Germany under the name Lange) became defensive when asked about her decision to be a concentration camp guard. She replied:

"Did I make a mistake? No. The mistake was that it was a concentration camp, but I had to go to it, otherwise I would have been put into it myself. That was my mistake."

Bothe died on 16 March 2000, at the age of 79.

== See also ==
- List of Nazis
- Female guards in Nazi concentration camps
