= Erich Uhmann =

German teacher and entomologist (1881–1968)

- Born: Erich Leo Ludwig Uhmann; 4 November 1881; Chemnitz, Germany
- Died: 15 January 1968 (aged 86); Stollberg, Germany
- Education: University of Leipzig
- Occupation: Teacher (1908–1943)
- Known for: Contributions to beetle taxonomy
- Awards: honorary doctorate (Humboldt University of Berlin)
- Scientific career
- Fields: Entomology
- Author abbrev. (zoology): Uhmann

Erich Leo Ludwig Uhmann (4 November 1881 – 15 January 1968) was a German teacher and entomologist known for his contributions to beetle taxonomy. Born in Chemnitz, he worked as a secondary school teacher in Stollberg from 1908 to 1943. During this period he also pursued entomological research, largely focusing on hispine beetles, which he continued after retiring from teaching until his death in 1968. A prolific author of scientific papers, Uhmann would come to be recognised as an international expert on hispines, having published over 200 papers on hispine taxonomy.

== Life and career ==
Erich Leo Ludwig Uhmann was born on 4 November 1881 in Chemnitz, Germany, and expressed an interest in botany and entomology early in life. He attended secondary school at the Wettiner Gymnasium in Dresden and graduated in 1902. He began attending the University of Leipzig in 1903, majoring in mathematics and the natural sciences (botany, zoology, geography, and physics). After completing his studies in 1907, he spent a year as a trainee teacher in Chemnitz. In 1908 he took up work as a teacher at a secondary school in Stollberg, remaining here until moving to another school in the same town in 1925, where he worked until his retirement from teaching in 1943. Uhmann married Lydia née Palhorn in 1914 and was briefly drafted to serve in World War I between 1917 and the end of the war in 1918.

Uhmann began studying beetles in 1907 and was an avid collector, becoming a member of the German Entomological Institute in 1914 and making several trips across Europe with fellow beetle collectors Max Link and Karl Dorn. In this period he was focused on staphylinid beetles and the biota of the Ore Mountains, publishing his first scientific paper, Zwei Staphyliniden mit anormalen Bildungen (Col.), in 1919. His severe near-sightedness made collecting beetles in the field increasingly difficult, and in 1925 he was encouraged to pursue the study of the Cassidinae, specifically hispine beetles, by then-director of the German Entomological Institute Walther Horn, who assisted him in establishing connections with museums and collectors to access specimens. Uhmann's first scientific paper on hispines, Beitrag zur Kenntnis der Hispinen (Col.), was published in 1926. He primarily published species descriptions and catalogues of museum holdings, though his work also included identification keys and catalogues compiling lists of known species. Many of these works included original illustrations. From 1949 to 1956 he worked on compiling a worldwide catalogue of all known tribes, genera, and species of hispine beetle published since 1758 that ultimately included 3010 species. The first volume, Coleopterorum Catalogus, Supplementa. Chrysomelidae: Hispinae, Hispinae Americanae, was published in 1957, with a second volume, Coleopterorum Catalogus Supplementa. Chrysomelidae: Hispinae, Hispinae, Africanae, Eurasiaticae, Australicae, published the following year. A supplement, Coleopterorum Catalogus, Supplementa. Chrysomelidae: Hispinae, Corrigenda et Addenda, was published in 1964.

Uhmann began receiving an honorary government pension in 1956 and was awarded an honorary doctorate of natural sciences by the Humboldt University of Berlin on 4 November 1961, his 80th birthday.

== Death and legacy ==
Uhmann died at age 86 on 15 January 1968 in Stollberg, Germany. His specimen collection and correspondences, including 2886 letters dating from 1908 to 1965, are deposited in the German Entomological Institute in Eberswalde. He was among the most prolific authors to publish on the subfamily Cassidinae, alongside Carl Henrik Boheman and Julius Weise, and the most prolific hispine taxonomist of the 20th century. Throughout his life Uhmann published 235 scholarly articles on hispines and proposed 5 tribes, 39 genera, 606 species, and 61 subspecies of hispine beetle.
