= Erika Bergmann =

Nazi guard

- Born: 3 January 1915; Neukölln, German Empire
- Died: 1996 (aged 81); Guben, Brandenburg, Germany
- Occupation: Concentration camp guard
- Status: Deceased
- Motive: Nazism
- Conviction: Murder (6 counts)
- Penalty: Life imprisonment

Details
- Imprisoned at: Hoheneck Fortress

Erika Bergmann (3 January 1915 – 1996) was a German Nazi concentration camp guard at two labor camps during World War II. She was known as the "beast in human skin" (German: Bestie in Menschenhaut) for her cruel treatment of prisoners during her tenure as a warden at Ravensbrück concentration camp, according to a 1990 edition of the East German magazine Für Dich.

== Biography ==
Bergmann was born on 3 January 1915 in Neukölln, at the time an independent city near Berlin. In 1943 she arrived at Ravensbrück concentration camp where she received her initial training and first assignment. In the same year, along with other female concentration guards (German: Aufseherin) she accompanied a transport of prisoners to the Genthin sub-camp where she remained until the end of the war.

After the war, Bergmann moved to East Germany, where she lived until her past was exposed in 1955. She was accused of acts of cruelty towards prisoners, including using a whip and inciting an attack by a dog on prisoners (killing six of them), as well as other crimes. Placed on trial in an East German court in Neubrandenburg, she was found guilty of six murders and sentenced to life imprisonment on 2 November 1955. The explanation of the verdict stated:

"As an Aufseherin in the Ravensbrück concentration camp in the period 1943[-1945], the defendant had mistreated prisoners: one day this Aufseherin had been ordered to take a column of Ravensbrück prisoners outside the camp for leveling work. She used her dog against an approximately 20-year-old Gypsy woman, who, in her opinion, worked too slowly. The four-legged tiger tore the girl's lower body to pieces. Bleeding and with outwardly hanging intestines the unconscious was ordered by Bergmann to be left lying for a few hours there; Bergmann forbade the women to look after the badly injured, when the column returned to the camp in the evening and wanted to take the Gypsy woman with them, only a corpse was found."

In one account of her crimes, she ordered a dog to attack two Gypsy women, who were then bitten by the animal in the ribs and feet. In another instance, after a Polish prisoner was seriously injured by Bergmann's dog during the fall of 1945, that woman was then ordered to work despite the wound, and was given no permission to be treated. A witness stated at the trial that the prisoner had been beaten by Bergmann because her hair had been too long and curly, adding that the beating was so vicious that the prisoner was blind for six months. Another time the same witness was beaten by Bergmann and kicked with her boots, because she had had worn a headscarf in the rain. Bergmann also reportedly shouted: "She who is a prisoner is not a person!" In a different incident, prisoners working in a cellar where thousands of kilos of vegetables were reportedly spoiled by the negligence of SS men were ordered by Bergmann to stand along a fence, and then were then beaten with a dog leash. One prisoner was covered with swollen wounds; another had her face cut open by a nail. In a separate case, a 61-year-old woman was forced to stand for nine hours in the cold, open air while Bergmann showered her with ice-cold water. The woman later died from the abuse, as did a Gypsy who was beaten by Bergmann until she collapsed.

After German reunification in 1990, Bergmann was still in Hoheneck Fortress along with Ulla Jürß, another female concentration camp guard. They both petitioned for clemency and were released on probation in May 1991. At the time of Bergmann's release, she was the longest serving Nazi war criminal tried under East German law. Bergmann died in 1996 in Guben, Germany.
