= Horst and Erna Petri =

Married Nazi war criminals

Horst Petri
- Horst's booking photo after his arrest (1960)
- Born: March 18, 1913; Pfuhlsborn, German Empire
- Died: December 22, 1962 (aged 49); Leipzig Prison, Leipzig, East Germany
- Cause of death: Execution by guillotine
- Political party: Nazi Party; Liberal Democratic Party of Germany; Free German Trade Union Federation; Peasants Mutual Aid Association
- Spouse: Erna Petri (m. 1937)
- Children: 2
- Status: Executed
- Motive: Nazism
- Convictions: War crimes Crimes against humanity Murder; Incitement to murder Accessory to murder Attempted manslaughter Infliction of grievous bodily harm
- Penalty: Death

Details
- Victims: Hundreds
- Span of crimes: 1939–1945
- Country: Ukraine
- Targets: Jews and Partisans
- Date apprehended: August 1961 (for war crimes)
- SS career
- Allegiance: Nazi Germany
- Branch: Schutzstaffel
- Service years: 1934–1945
- Rank: Untersturmführer

Erna Petri
- Erna's booking photo after her arrest (1961)
- Born: Erna Kürbs; May 30, 1920; Herressen, Weimar Republic
- Died: July 2000 (aged 80); Germany
- Political party: Nazi Party; LPG "Drei Tannen"
- Spouse: Horst Petri (m. 1937, executed 1962)
- Children: 2
- Status: Deceased
- Motive: Nazism
- Convictions: War crimes Crimes against humanity
- Penalty: Life imprisonment

Details
- Victims: 10
- Span of crimes: 1942–1943
- Country: Ukraine
- Target: Jews
- Date apprehended: August 1961
- Imprisoned at: Hoheneck Fortress

Horst Petri (March 18, 1913 – December 12, 1962) and Erna Petri (May 30, 1920 – July 2000) were married Nazi war criminals during World War II.

== Early lives ==
After graduating from high school, Horst trained as a farmer and received a graduate degree in farming in 1935. During this time, he joined the Nazi Party and SS, the former in 1932 and the latter in 1934.

Erna Kürbs was born into a farming family in the village of Herressen near Weimar. In 1936, the 16-year-old Erna met Horst, who spoke to her about the Greater German Reich. Although her father was opposed, the two quickly struck up a relationship. When Erna became pregnant a year later, the two wed in 1938. The child was a boy. Erna became pregnant once more in 1942 and had a daughter in January 1943.

== War crimes ==
In 1939, Horst received SS Camps Division training at the Dachau and Buchenwald concentration camps. During the war, he would eventually rise to the rank of Untersturmführer.

In June 1942, the Petris moved to the Grzenda manor house in Poland after Horst was appointed as a plant manager there. They received frequent visits from SS and Wehrmacht officers. Within two days of moving, Erna witnessed her husband beating a laborer. Horst also routinely raped his female servants. Local farmers called him a sadist who enjoyed whipping Ukrainians, Poles, and Jews.

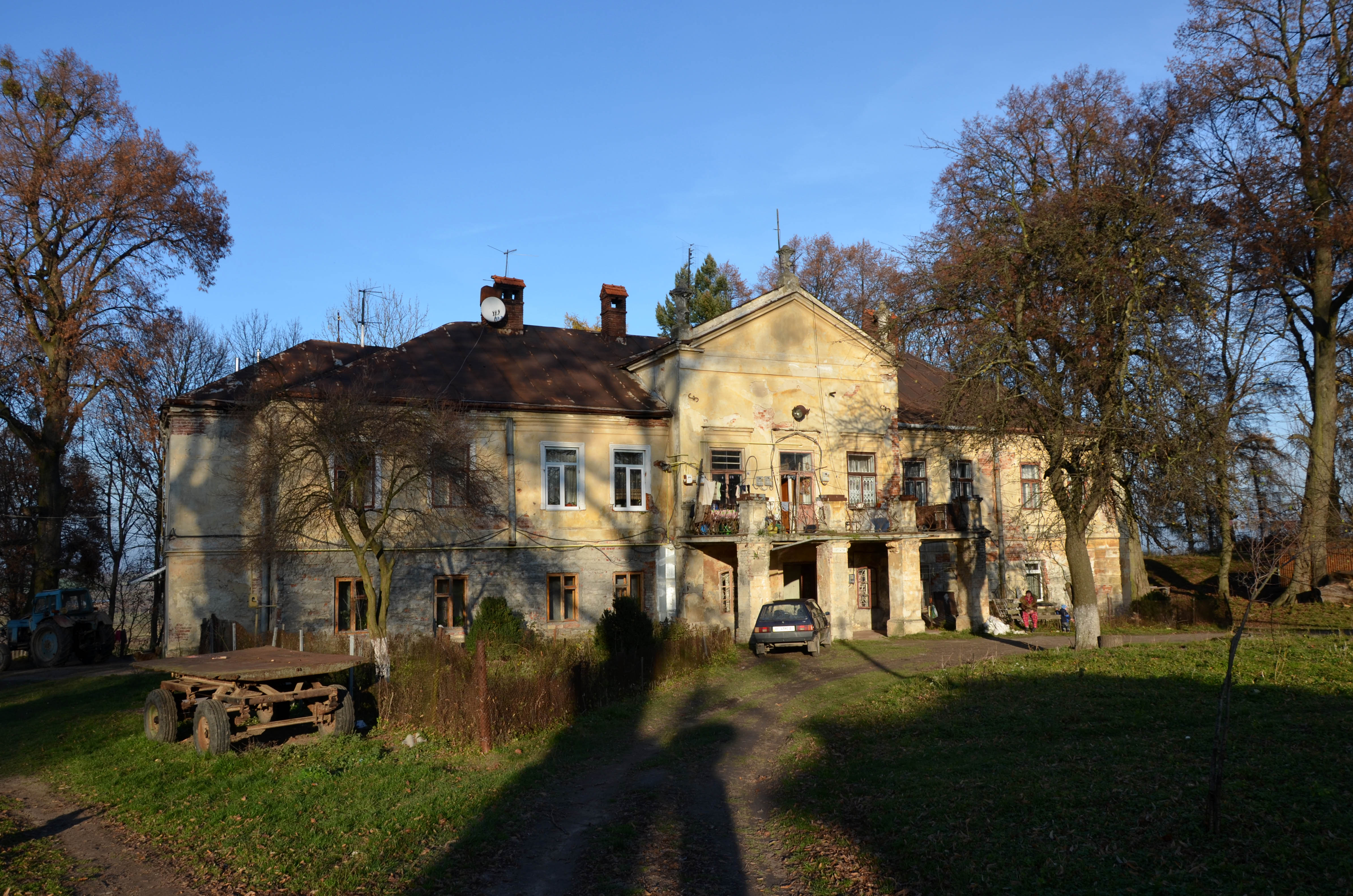
The Grzenda manor house, pictured in 2015

When four Jews were caught in the estate while trying to escape from a transport to a concentration camp, Horst told Erna and her female guest that "this was men's work, nothing that women should be concerned about." Horst then executed the Jews as they were walking away.

When Horst was not home, he participated in mass shootings of the Jewish population in a town next to the estate. He also participated in mass deportations, and the massacre of 15 Ukrainian farmers who were reported to have delivered food to partisans. He also once indiscriminately bombed a Ukrainian village with grenade launchers after suspecting the citizens of supporting partisans. Seven villagers died.

Erna followed her husband's lead and abused her farm workers. She often fired warning shots at them, sometimes as her son watched. On one occasion, Erna had her husband send three Ukrainian peasant women to Janowska concentration camp after they refused to work. To her surprise, all three women were spared death, and she allowed them back to the manor several weeks later. Erna also accompanied her husband on hunts for fugitive Jews, during which she personally killed four Jewish men.

After the harvest in autumn 1942, the approximately 150 Jews from Grzenda were also transported to the Janowska concentration camp or the Belzec extermination camp.

In September 1943, Erna was returning from a shopping trip in Lvov in her carriage when she came across six nearly naked boys (aged 6 to 12) crouching by the side of the road. The children had escaped from a railcar destined for Sobibor camp. The children were terrified and hungry. When Erna realized they were Jewish escapees, she calmed them, took them home, fed them and waited for her husband to return. When Horst did not return after several hours, Erna took the children into the woods to a pit where other Jews had been buried, lined them up, and shot them one by one execution-style.

In 1944, the Petris fled their manor due to the advance of the Red Army. Horst got his SS tattoo removed to destroy evidence. He was taken prisoner by U.S. soldiers, but was released in May 1945.

== Arrest and trial ==
Horst and Erna both avoided detection during the initial search for war criminals in the post-war period. They settled down in East Germany and became farmers. Horst joined the Liberal Democratic Party of Germany, the Free German Trade Union Federation, and the Peasants Mutual Aid Association.

In 1957, the Petris' son fled the country, drawing the attention of the Stasi, which started surveilling them. They were arrested for "anti-state activities" in July or August 1961. While searching through their house, Stasi officers found no evidence of the couple plotting against the state. However they happened to come across photos of the Grzenda manor and a guestbook from the war. The guestbook contained the names of numerous senior SS officers and Wehrmacht officers. The most damning name was that of Fritz Katzmann.

Both Petris were interrogated for months. Horst confessed. Erna initially denied everything, but also confessed after about a month of questioning. Asked why she did not talk sooner, she said she feared punishment, but thought her husband would take the blame for her crimes.

Erna told the officers that she had learned how to best kill someone while overhearing her husband's colleagues discussing the mass shootings of Jews. Officials said that "from time to time", she showed "human emotions". However, most of them were disgusted and could not understand how she was able to shoot children.

- Why did you shoot the Jewish men and children?
  - I was barely twenty-five years old, still young and inexperienced. I lived only under my husband, who was in the SS and carried out shootings of Jewish persons. I seldom came into contact with other women, so that in the course of this time I became more hardened, desensitized. ... I wanted to show [the SS men] that I, as a woman, could conduct myself like a man. So I shot four Jews and six Jewish children. I wanted to prove myself to the men ... .
- "How could you as a mother of two children … shoot innocent Jewish children?"
  - "I am unable to grasp at this time how in those days I was in such a state as to conduct myself so brutally and reprehensibly. However, I had been so conditioned to fascism and the racial laws, which established a view toward the Jewish people. As was told to me, I had to destroy the Jews. It was from this frame of mind that I came to commit such a brutal act."

Both confessions were detailed and consistent with one another. The Stasi then turned over the evidence to the local prosecutor, who charged them with numerous offenses, including war crimes and crimes against humanity. In September 1962, Erna and her husband went on trial in Erfurt. Seventeen witnesses, mostly former workers from the manor, testified against them. The Petris said they kept the shootings of the children quiet. Horst had told Erna she made the right choice, but told her not to discuss the incident. Erna was a civilian and not authorized to kill Jews. If the news spread, there was a small chance of her facing questioning.

Erna explained that she had fed the children before killing them. She also said after the first two had been killed, the others began to cry, "but not loudly, they whimpered". None of the children fled since they were exhausted after being on a railcar for several days. In an audio recording of the trial, Erna was so open with the details of her crimes that the prosecutor cut her off and said "Thank you, we have heard enough". Although Horst was less cooperative, the testimony of the witnesses confirmed his guilt beyond any doubt. At times, Erna got caught in "memory lapses". She was called out as a liar by the judge.

In his verdict, the judge recognized the passage of time. But while he acknowledged this, he said "it is essential that these crimes be uncovered with regard for the passage of time." He considered having both Petris executed. However, he felt that Erna's husband was partly responsible for her behavior and that "the constant interaction with the SS beasts in Grzenda was a considerable factor in causing her to commit crimes." He also said that overall, Horst's crimes were far more serious:

- The mass shootings and mass deportations of Jews
- Torturing and abusing the locals, often without provocation with the infliction of permanent injuries
- Participating in the drive-by hunts and shootings of Jewish escapees
- Participating in the massacre of 15 Ukrainian peasants who were accused of giving food to partisans
- Using grenade launchers to indiscriminately bomb a Ukrainian village which he suspected of supporting partisans
  - Seven villagers were killed
- Additional murders and executions

No Jewish witnesses were sought for the trial, so Horst's further crimes against Jews were not mentioned. Nevertheless, the evidence showed that Horst had not only routinely abused and murdered people, but that he often did this on his own initiative, without direct orders. According to the judge, this was the deciding factor in sentencing. On September 15, 1962, Erna was sentenced to life in prison, while her husband was sentenced to death.

Horst unsuccessfully appealed to the Supreme Court of East Germany. The appeal was rejected less than a month later. Chief of State Walter Ulbricht had the option to grant clemency. After he declined to intervene, Horst was guillotined at Leipzig Prison on December 22, 1962. Horst's remains were cremated, and he was buried in an unmarked grave.

Erna was sent to Hoheneck Fortress to serve her sentence. Caught off-guard by the severity of the sentencing, she retracted her statements and started to fight her case. Her friends and family reassured her that she could quickly get out of prison. However, Erna's pleas for release, and those of her children on behalf, were routinely ignored by East German officials.

In letters to her attorneys, Erna wrote that the court interpreter had mistranslated the words of the foreign witnesses who testified against her, resulting in her being falsely implicated. She wrote long letters to the prosecutor's office, attempting to explain herself. In a 1963 appeal, Erna insisted that she had never killed anyone nor handled a gun. Only out of "love and fear" had she falsely confessed to murdering the children, hoping to help her husband. Erna then said she had heard about the Jews who were being deported to Lublin to be gassed, and protested. She claimed to have told her husband that "those people are humans after all", only to be silenced by him, who told her to be quiet or she would get in trouble.

All of these claims were rejected. Becoming more desperate, Erna claimed that in 1938, around the time of Kristallnacht, she had protested the treatment of Jews, and that only her pregnancy kept her from being immediately arrested. In a politically riskier appeal, Erna described her interrogation. She claimed that the Stasi had baited her into confessing to the murders with a note from Horst. The note, which she said was a forgery, implicated her in the murders of the children. Erna said she was angry about the note since she was innocent, but had concluded that it was a plea for help from Horst. Erna said she had chosen to take some of the blame for his sake.

In December 1989, after the fall of the Berlin Wall, Erna, now nearly 70, wrote to West German attorneys, describing her interrogation. She claimed that during the war, she had taken regular trips to Lviv for supplies. During her trips, she had visited the Janowska camp to select Jewish laborers and brought them back to her manor. Erna remembered having Jewish women help her in the house, but could not remember what happened to them (during her 1961 interrogation, she described these women as troublemakers). Insisting that she was innocent, Erna wrote, "I sacrificed myself for my husband, the man my parents warned me about." She acknowledged that Horst had killed Jews and was rightfully punished.

Erna's case was re-examined, and her children continued to lobby for her release. They wrote pleas to the West German chancellor, U.S. president, Russian premier, and the German Parliament. Their mother, they claimed, was an innocent victim of Stasi interrogation and torture. They said her confessions were false and taken under duress, and that she had suffered enough regardless. They said she had been in prison, away from her family and grieving her executed husband, for nearly 30 years.

On December 31, 1989, Erna was one of 46 Nazi war criminals convicted under East German law who were in prison. Between 1989 and April 1990, 23 of these convicts were released or died in prison. After taking time served and other factors into account, another five were released in a partial amnesty. After the reunification, Erna, who was still in prison, petitioned for a review of her case.

Although a West German court affirmed the verdict and sentence, Erna was released from prison on health grounds in 1992. One account claims that Stille Hilfe, a relief organization for the SS, convinced a court to release her. Stille Hilfe allegedly paid for Erna's apartment after her release. The organization was likely also responsible for her being invited to Bavaria, where she went on trips to the Alpine mountains and lakes with Gudrun Burwitz, the daughter of Heinrich Himmler and a prominent member of Stille Hilfe. Erna once referred to Burwitz as "the most wonderful woman."

Erna died in July 2000, a few months after her 80th birthday. Two hundred people, which was everyone in her village, and a number of other people whom her family did not know, attended her funeral.

The children of the Petris never retracted their support for their mother. In an interview in 2006, Erna's daughter, who was 18 when her mother was arrested, said her parents had often showed the photo albums to her and special guests. Had she realized that the Stasi were going to eventually find them by chance, she said she would have just gotten rid of them.

== Bibliography ==
- Stargardt, Nicholas (2016). The German war : a nation under arms, 1939-45. London: Vintage. ISBN 9780099539872. OCLC 958464080. pp. 291/20
- Lower, Wendy (2013). Hitler's furies : German women in the Nazi killing fields. Boston: Houghton Mifflin. ISBN 9780547863382. OCLC 852031499.
