= Margarete Gallinat =

Nazi concentration camp guard (born 1894)

- Born: 1894; East Prussian Puntigam
- Died: Unknown
- Occupation: Chief supervisor at Kamp Vught
- Known for: Supervisor at Ravensbrück concentration camp

Oberaufseherin Margarete Gallinat (born 1894, date of death unknown) was the chief supervisor at Kamp Vught, Netherlands. She later became a supervisor at Ravensbrück concentration camp.

== Life ==
Gallinat was born in 1894 in East Prussian Puntigam.

== Work as Oberaufseherin ==
In April 1940, Gallinat read a newspaper ad for Aufseherin and decided to apply. Two months later she started in Ravensbrück, where she worked until the summer of 1943, eventually becoming deputy Oberaufseherin. Survivor testimony stated that she led test victims away to be executed, beat them with her whip and threw stones at them.
