= Lotte Toberentz =

German concentration camp administrator (1900 – unknown)

Lotte Toberentz, born Maria Charlotte Toberentz (27 May 1900 – date of death unknown) was a German concentration camp overseer in Nazi Germany. She was tried in the Third Ravensbrück Trials but was acquitted of crimes due to lack of evidence.

== Career in the Reich ==
Toberentz worked at the Reich headquarters for combating juvenile crime from 1940. She was appointed as the head overseer of the Uckermark concentration camp for girls, a subcamp of Ravensbrück concentration camp, in its early years. From December 1944 to April 1945 she was Lagerführerin (camp leader) of the Ravensbrück concentration camp. She is said to have resisted the dissolution of the camp at the end of World War II.

Toberentz was tried in the Third Ravensbrück Trials at Hamburg in 1948 for her role as Camp Leader at Uckermark. She was acquitted of all crimes due to a lack of evidence. However, the indictment included only crimes against Allied nationals and German non-conformist girls and young women prisoners. It is clear that she was not tried for crimes in Ravensbrück. Freed after the trial, Toberentz became an official in the German police force.

There is evidence of SS Wardress complicity in the crimes of the Camp Administration. "In late 1944, SS women in Ravensbrueck set up next to the crematorium a provisional gas chamber. Here the SS from late Jan[uary] to April 1945 gassed 5 to 6,000 detainees." Also, the United States Holocaust Memorial Museum states that "in late March 1945, the SS transported about 5,600 female prisoners from Ravensbrück to the Mauthausen and Bergen-Belsen concentration camps. In April 1945, the SS guards forced about 20,000 female prisoners, as well as most of the remaining male prisoners, on a brutal and forced evacuation on foot toward northern Mecklenberg."

== Literature ==
- THE CAMP WOMEN: The Female Auxiliaries Who Assisted the SS in Running the Concentration Camp System, by Daniel Patrick Brown.
