= Hilde Lobauer =

Female SS in Auschwitz and Bergen-Belsen

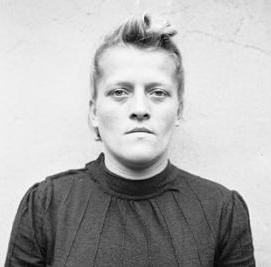
- Born: 8 November 1918 (age 107); Plauen, Germany
- Years active: 1942–1945
- Status: Convicted
- Convictions: 10 years imprisonment

Hilde Lobauer (born 8 November 1918) was a German political prisoner and later a concentration camp guard in Auschwitz-Birkenau and Bergen-Belsen. She was known most as "the SS woman without uniform."

== Life ==
Hilde Lobauer, or Lohbauer, was born in Plauen, Germany, in 1918 and was an unmarried German mother of two. In 1940 she worked in a weaving mill but was sent to Ravensbrück as a political prisoner after refusing to move to a munitions factory in Württemberg to make munitions for the German Army. She was then sent to Auschwitz in March 1942 where she was a prisoner and Kapo in the main camp for four weeks before she was transferred to Birkenau in April 1942.

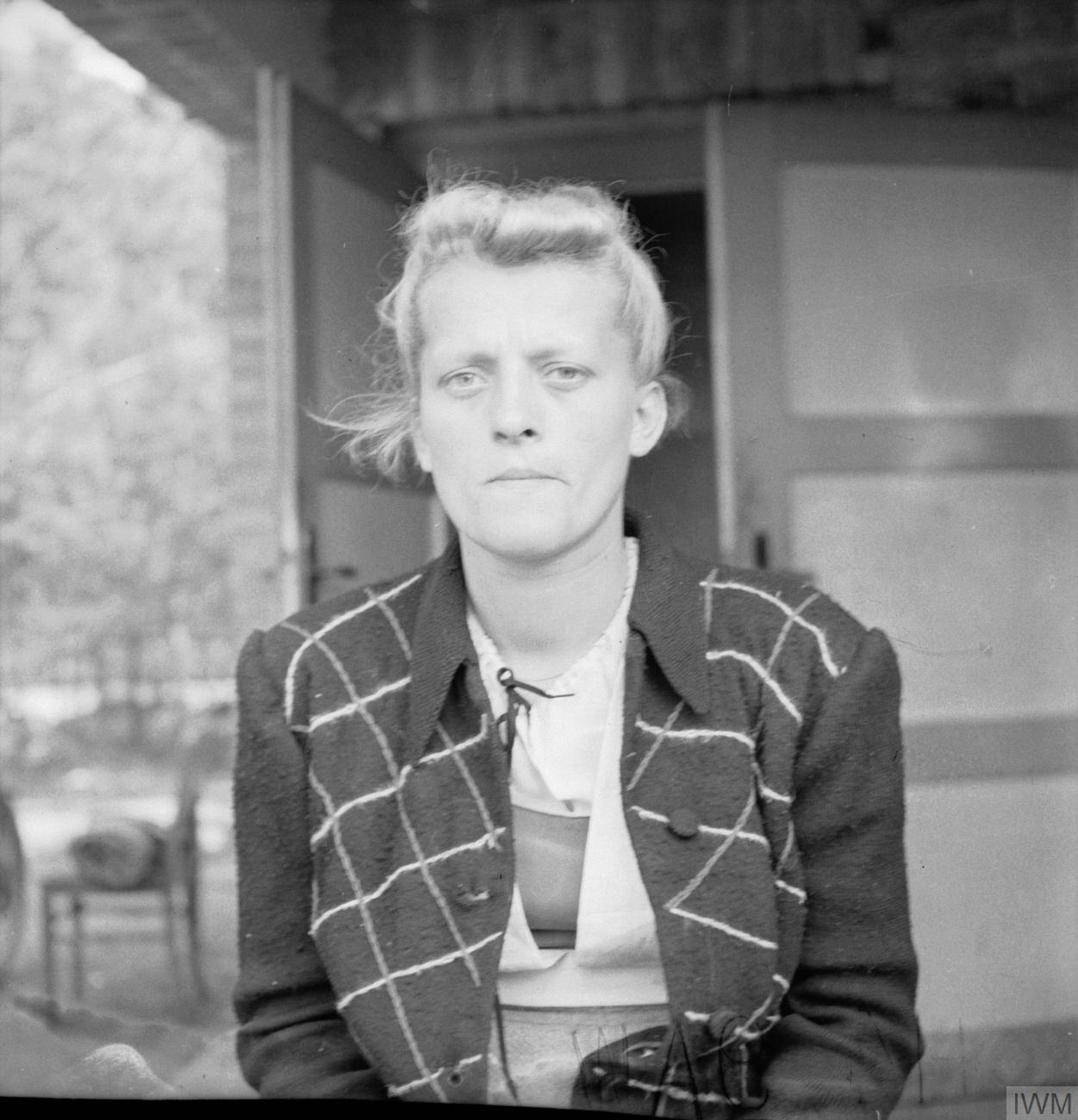
Photo taken by British forces after the liberation of Bergen-Belsen in April 1945

During her time in Auschwitz she controlled prisoners' work, marched them through the camp, and was in charge of basic order and cleanliness. In 1944 she was selected/ordered to become an Arbeitsdienstführerin or labor leader in Birkenau where she worked the compounds "A" and "E" in the women's camp. Her role in Birkenau was similar to her role in the main camp. She took orders from Lagerführer Hasse and Arbeitsdienstführerin Mendel and gave orders to 30 or so Kapos below her. She became known as the SS woman without a uniform.

In March 1945 she was evacuated to Bergen-Belsen alongside Ilse Lothe. In Bergen-Belsen she held her position as a labour leader until the camp was liberated. Bergen-Belsen was liberated in early April 1945 by British forces, and she was taken to Celle prison to await trial. The British initially arrested her on the charge of aiding Nazi scientist Dr. Fritz Kline in his experiments.

== Belsen trials ==
The first Belsen trials started 17 September 1945, in Lüneburg. Lobauer was a principal defendant (number 11) and was represented by British Major L. S. W. Cranfield, R.A. who also represented the infamous Irma Grese, Ilse Lothe, and Josef Klippel. She was identified by many during the trial and accused of drowning women in a pool at Oswiecim, selecting prisoners for the gas chambers, and beating prisoners with a rubber truncheon. When examined by Major Cranfield she denied drowning the women or subjecting them to any excessive beatings. She stated that she was forced by SS leadership to beat the prisoners and that she never beat them hard enough to break the skin. When she was examined on the stand she took accountability only for occasional beatings.

Lobauer was charged on two counts. The first count was for mistreatment of prisoners in Auschwitz-Birkenau and the second charge was for mistreatment of prisoners in Auschwitz. On 17 November 1945, at the age of 27, she was sentenced to 10 years in prison. This was then reduced to 7 years imprisonment, and she was later released 15 July 1950.
