= Irma Grese =

German war criminal and Holocaust perpetrator (1923–1945)

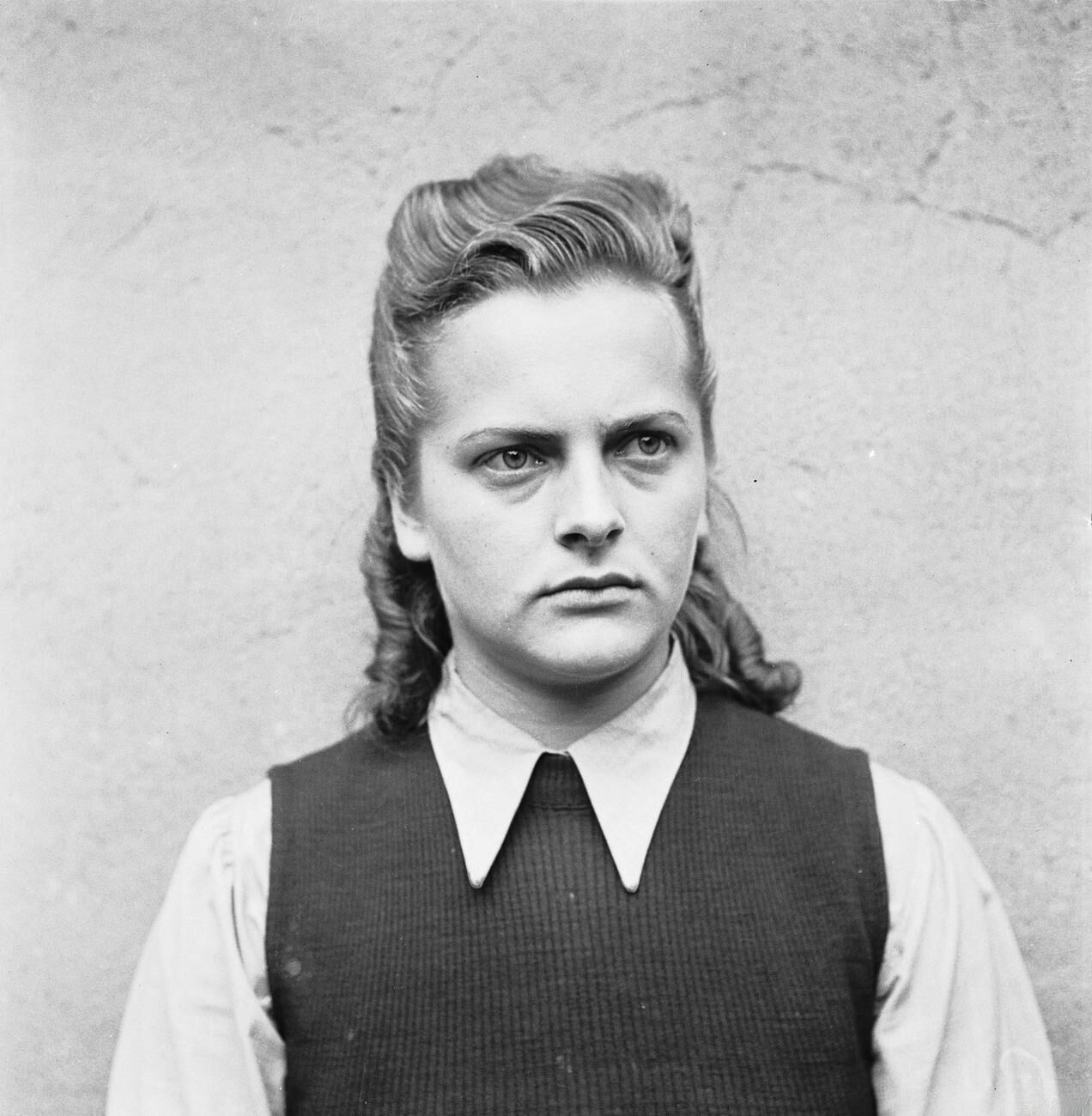
- Grese awaiting trial at Celle, 8 August 1945
- Born: 7 October 1923; Wrechen, Mecklenburg-Strelitz, Germany
- Died: 13 December 1945 (aged 22); Hamelin, Schaumburg-Lippe, Germany
- Other names: Beast of Belsen; Bitch of Belsen; Hyena of Auschwitz; The Beautiful Beast; Angel of Auschwitz
- Status: Executed by hanging
- Motive: Nazism; Sadism
- Conviction: War crimes
- Trial: Belsen trial
- Penalty: Death
- Schutzstaffel (Note: The women in SS-Gefolge were not official members of the Schutzstaffel.)
- Allegiance: Nazi Germany
- Division: SS-Gefolge
- Service years: 1942–1945
- Rank: * Ravensbrück; Aufseherin: Auschwitz II-Birkenau Oberaufseherin; Bergen-Belsen Arbeitsdienstführerin, Rapportführerin
- Units: Ravensbrück; Auschwitz II-Birkenau; Bergen-Belsen

Irma Ilse Ida Grese (Note: Spelt "Greze" or "Griese" in some survivors' memoirs.) (7 October 1923 – 13 December 1945) was a German Nazi concentration camp guard at Ravensbrück, Auschwitz II-Birkenau, and Bergen-Belsen. She has been widely known as the "Hyena of Auschwitz" and the "Beast of Belsen" for the atrocities she committed during her service.

Following the Allied occupation of Nazi Germany in April 1945, Grese was found guilty of war crimes involving the torture and murder of Jewish prisoners at the Belsen trial and sentenced to death by hanging. She was hanged at the age of 22, making her the youngest woman to be judicially executed under British law in the twentieth century.

== Early life ==
Irma Ilse Ida Grese was born on 7 October 1923, in Wrechen, a rural village of Feldberg (since merged into Feldberger Seenlandschaft) to parents Alfred Anton Albert Grese and Berta Wilhelmine Winter. She was the third of five children, the others being Helene, Lieschen, Alfred, and Otto. Alfred worked as a senior milker at the Wrechen Manor House, a small dairy farm with two farmhands and a few cows that provided a modest income for the Grese family. Berta, a housewife, cared for the family garden and the few animals they had, including pigs, geese, and chickens.

According to Daniel Patrick Brown, a professor and author, Berta was a "troubled woman" who struggled with the family's financial instability. In late 1935, she attempted suicide by ingesting hydrochloric acid after discovering Alfred's affair with the daughter of the local pub owner. Berta died months later, in January 1936. Grese, who was twelve years old at the time, found her mother dead.

There are conflicting accounts of Alfred's personality and role as a father in Grese's life. Irma stated in 1943 that he was "very religious and conservative and did not believe in Nazism". She also noted that Alfred enjoyed drinking but did not have alcoholism, had not physically abused his children, had joined the Nazi Party in 1937, and had become an Ortsgruppenleiter (though he was "not an extremist").

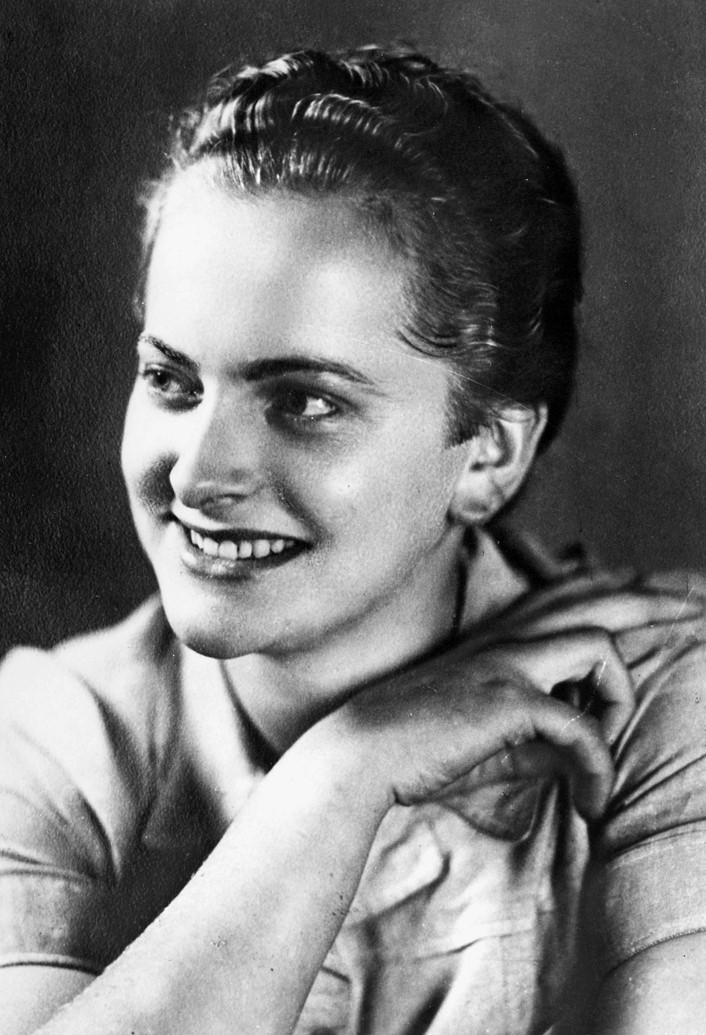
Grese, c. July 1942

Grese became a member of the Bund Deutscher Mädel in 1937 or 1938. She later told survivor Magda Hellinger that she was "quite proud of this because the organization was open only to 'genuine' Aryans"; her membership caused a rift between herself and her father. Grese's previously unremarkable personality began to change during this period. According to Wrechen residents, she became more withdrawn, would "stand on a hill and whistle like some boy", and did not show any interest in interacting with her peers, who allegedly bullied her.

Grese left school in 1938 at the age of fourteen and worked at a dairy factory in Fürstenberg for six months before moving on to work as a retail clerk in a small shop in Lychen for another six. Grese was hired the following year as an apprentice aide to an assistant nurse at the Hohenlychen Sanatorium, where SS personnel received treatment. She was mentored by director Alter Kämpfer Karl Gebhardt, whom Grese later described as a "saint" of the Nazi Party. She was eventually let go from her position in 1941 because she did not meet expectations, though Grese claimed years later that the Reichsarbeitsdienst prevented her from becoming a nurse. Gebhardt pitied Grese and gave her the contact information for a colleague who worked at the Ravensbrück concentration camp.

== Work as a Helferin ==
=== KZ Ravensbrück (1942–1943) ===
Grese was initially denied entry into Ravensbrück's training program because of her age. She met with Gebhardt's colleague and was instructed to come back when she turned eighteen, which was six months away. She did not return within the expected time frame; however, this was because she was hired to work at another dairy farm from March 1941 to June 1942.

In July 1942, she entered Ravensbrück as a trainee. She completed the program in three weeks, after which she was given the title of Aufseherin. During her seven-month employment at the camp, where she received fifty-four Reichsmarks per month, she was claimed to have excelled.

Grese went to see her father Alfred in 1943, who had remarried in 1939 to a widow with four children of her own, while wearing her SS uniform. Alfred was initially impressed with Grese, who had not told him about the violence she had inflicted on the prisoners at the camp. Alfred's opinion changed when his stepdaughter came to him in tears because Grese had torn the head and limbs off her doll, and his young son playfully aimed Grese's revolver at him. Alfred reacted by taking the revolver from his son and striking Grese with it. Grese's sister Helene recalled the situation at the Belsen trial, stating that she had not seen their father act violently against Grese, but she had heard them argue because the latter was in the Schutzstaffel.

Grese returned to Ravensbrück immediately following the incident (her final return home), and spent the rest of her time at the concentration camp overseeing work details until March 1943, when she was transferred to Auschwitz II-Birkenau.

=== KZ Auschwitz II-Birkenau (1943–1945) ===
Grese was assigned to "Camp B" after arriving at Birkenau in March 1943, where she worked as a telephone operator in the office of a Blockführer. She allegedly committed a violation while working on this assignment, prompting her to be transferred to oversee a Strafkommando (punishment detail). While she would claim during the Belsen trial that she only oversaw this section for two days, Kapo Helena Kopper argued that Grese was in charge for seven months and was responsible for the deaths of at least thirty prisoners per day.

Grese was assigned various duties within the camp over the next few months. In the autumn, she led a gardening squad before taking over as mail censor from Aufseherin Elisabeth Volkenrath in December. Grese, who was 20 years old at the time, was promoted to Oberaufseherin, performing satisfactorily.

In May 1944, Grese was given the authority to oversee "Camp C", which consisted of 31 huts and held approximately 30,000 Jewish women from Poland and Hungary. However, survivor Helen Spitzer Tichauer revealed in her 1945 testimony that Grese was insufficiently qualified to command this section of Birkenau alone. She was assigned to work alongside Aufseherin Luise Danz, a new transfer from the Kraków-Płaszów concentration camp.

She was one of the most beautiful women I have ever seen. Her body was perfect in every line, her face clear and angelic and her blue eyes the gayest, the most innocent eyes one can imagine. And yet, Irma Greze was the most depraved, cruel, imaginative sexual pervert I ever came across.

— Gisella Perl,
I Was a Doctor in Auschwitz

Grese committed the majority of her violent acts while in command of "Camp C", where she wielded a rubber truncheon, pistol, and whip. Survivor Abraham Glinowieski stated in his testimony that Grese sent both sick and healthy Hungarian Jews to the gas chambers during selection. Survivor Edith Trieger also claimed Grese punched and kicked prisoners who attempted to flee the selection parades. Grese frequently ordered prisoners to "make sport", which referred to strenuous punitive exercises.

Survivor Olga Lengyel made numerous claims about Grese's sexual relations with SS personnel and both male and female Jewish prisoners while at Birkenau. Grese allegedly had affairs with married physician Josef Mengele and Lagerführer Josef Kramer, but her relationship with the former ended when he discovered her illicit liaisons with women.

Grese's sexual interactions with imprisoned Jewish women were sadistic in nature and frequent, according to a prisoner who had been appointed as her maid. Survivor Lengyel stated in her memoir that Grese had "favorite" prisoners whom she would treat as slaves for a period of time until she became bored, at which point she would send the women to the gas chambers. Survivor Gisella Perl, who worked as a doctor at Birkenau, wrote in her own memoir that Grese experienced orgasmic pleasure while watching her operate on young women's breasts that had been cut open by Grese's whip and infected with lice or dirt, using only a knife and no anesthesia. Perl also stated that Grese would kick the young woman being operated on if her screams interfered with her arousal.

Grese remained at Birkenau's "Camp C" until her brief transfer back to Ravensbrück on 18 January 1945, when all personnel were ordered to move westward due to the advance of Soviet forces.

=== KZ Bergen-Belsen (1945) ===
Grese's final assignment was to Bergen-Belsen in early March 1945. During her three-and-a-half week tenure, she served as Arbeitsdienstführerin (labor service leader) and Rapportführerin (commander of Blockführerinnen).

She was not supposed to be assigned to Bergen-Belsen because Lagerführer Kramer planned to transfer her to another camp once she arrived. She was vehemently opposed to the transfer, however, because she wanted to stay with her new lover Oberscharführer Franz Wolfgang Hatzinger, a married man fourteen years older whom Grese affectionately referred to as "Hatchi". (Note: Hellinger writes Hatzinger's forename as Fritz in her memoir.) During the Belsen trial, Aufseherin Johanna Bormann testified that Grese and Hatzinger "were very close and regularly sneaked off secretly to have sex".

Grese repeated the torturous and sadistic acts she committed at Birkenau in Bergen-Belsen. This included forcing prisoners to "make sport", which she justified during her trial because she believed the prisoners were "capable of partaking in such physical torment".

== Arrest and the Belsen trial ==
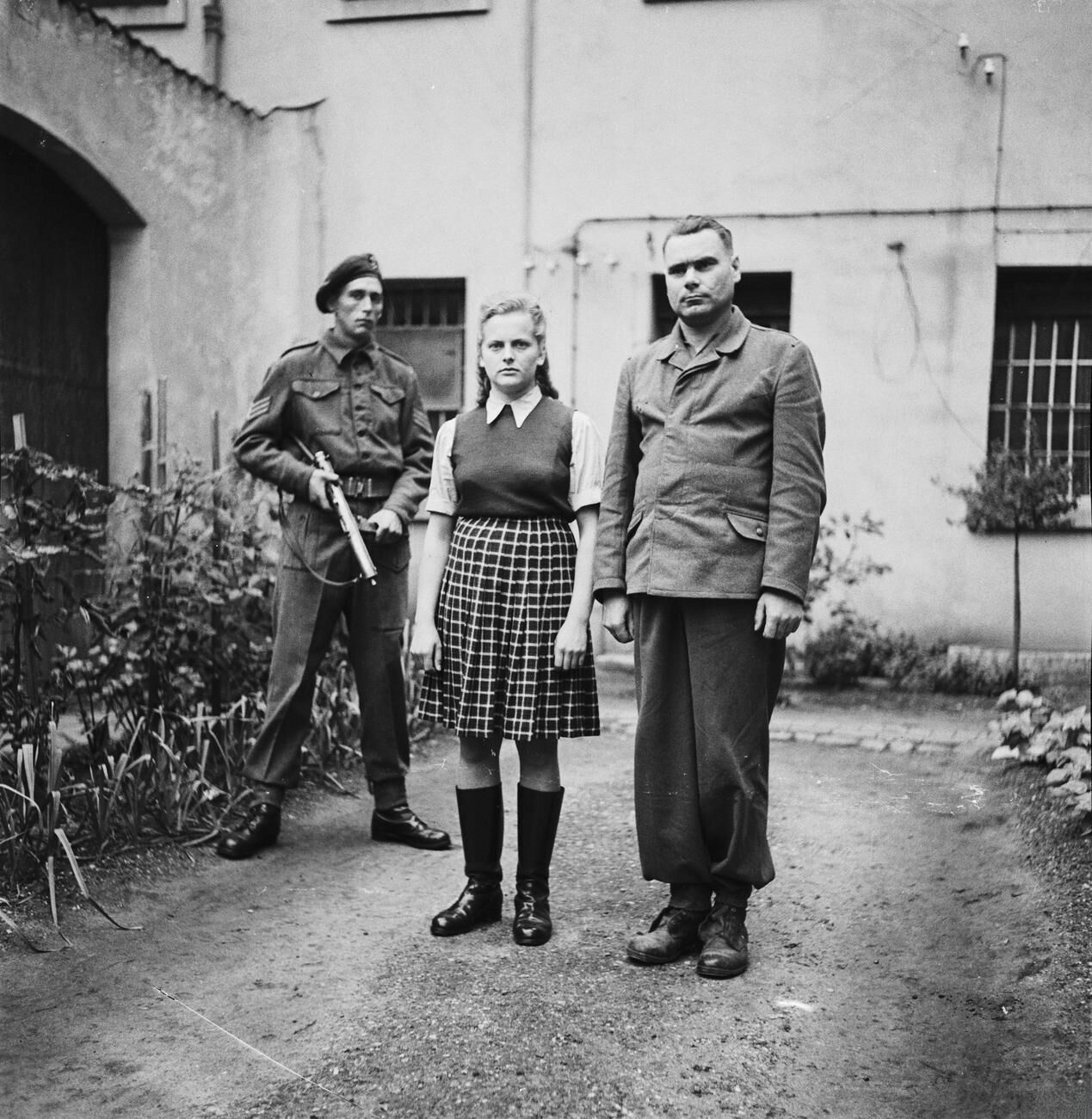
Grese and Kramer in the Celle courtyard, 8 August 1945

British forces liberated Bergen-Belsen on 15 April 1945. Grese and some other high-ranking SS officers chose to remain at the camp while Lagerführer Kramer issued the official call to surrender. Grese was said to have appeared arrogant when the British arrived at the camp and became hostile when she attempted to attack a British officer who entered one of the huts, causing her to be immediately restrained. Hatzinger died of typhus on 23 April 1945.

Grese was arrested and imprisoned at the Wehrmacht Tank Training School, three kilometers (2 miles) from the camp, where she was interrogated for two days.

Grese's trial in Lüneburg began on 17 September 1945, alongside 44 other defendants, and became known as the Belsen trials, even though the majority of the atrocities were committed at Birkenau. Grese faced two separate charges for war crimes committed at Bergen-Belsen and Birkenau between 1 October 1942 and 30 April 1945. Grese defended herself against these charges, saying, "Himmler is responsible for everything that has happened, but I suppose I am as much to blame as the others above me".

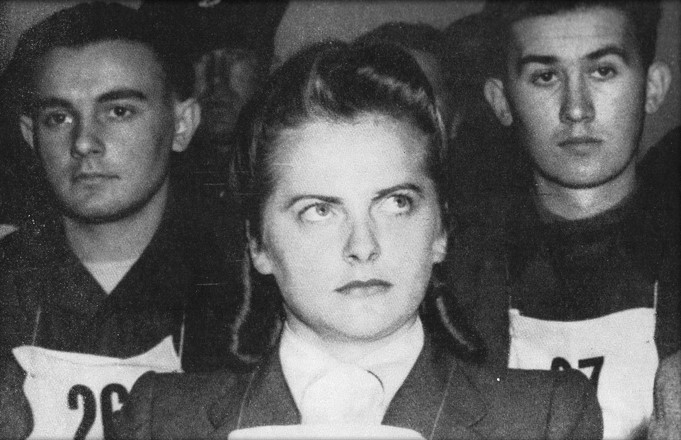
Grese at the Belsen trial, 17 September 1945

Grese's cold, arrogant, and unremorseful demeanor persisted throughout the trial, with terse answers to questions such as "I should know better than you whether or not I had a dog, don't you think?" and "I wish you would stop repeating the word 'regularly'", alluding to the numerous accusations made against her for her repeated violent acts against the prisoners. Grese's only moment of vulnerability came when her sister Helene gave character witness testimony, recounting the volatile interaction between Irma and their father in 1943, which caused her to break down sobbing. Helene also testified that she did not believe Grese could have acted violently against any prisoners, stating that "in our school days when, as it sometimes happens, girls were quarrelling or fighting, my sister never had the courage to fight, but on the contrary, she ran away".

Grese was found guilty of both war crime charges on day 54 of the Belsen trial. When it was declared that she would be hanged, she initially "showed total indifference" before she "broke into sobs" and later was found crying in fear in her cell. Her subsequent clemency appeal was denied because all anticipated pleas from the accused were rejected in advance.

Grese remained in the Lüneburg prison until 8 December, when she and the other ten guards sentenced to death were transferred to the Hamelin Prison.

== Execution ==
Grese and two other SS women, Elisabeth Volkenrath and Johanna Bormann, were sentenced to death. Grese was heard sobbing in her cell before the execution. On the morning of 13 December 1945, she was the second woman to be hanged by British executioner Albert Pierrepoint. Her final word was "Schnell" ("Quick"). Another source claims she had to be dragged "kicking" to the gallows. She was said to have been hanged first, as Pierrepoint wanted to "[spare] her any kind of trauma" because she was the youngest prisoner on the list to be executed, at 22 years old, but this was not the case. The original, dated and timed witnessed statements of the returned death warrants record that Volkenrath was the first to be executed at 09:34, Grese was the second at 10:03, and Bormann at 10:38.

To prevent people from turning Grese—and the rest of the men and women executed that day—into martyrs, the President of the Court ordered that her body and all the others be buried in the courtyard of Hamelin Prison rather than the cemetery. In 1954, the Lower Saxony government reburied all the remains in Friedhof Am Wehl cemetery, continuing the Allied policy of using mass graves. The cemetery was the focal point of neo-Nazi rallies until a Free German Workers' Party demonstration in 1986 led local authorities to level and stop tending the grave site.

== See also ==
- Female guards in Nazi concentration camps
