= Elisabeth Hasse =

Nazi guard at Auschwitz (1917–1946)

Elisabeth Hasse (December 24, 1917 – October 3, 1946) was a Nazi SS female supervisor and guard at Auschwitz concentration camp.

== Life ==
Hasse worked as director of the women's work detail at Rajsko, Auschwitz sub-camp, and was posted to Auschwitz concentration camp in October 1942. She was known for her brutal treatment of prisoners in the concentration camps. After the war, she was tried by a Soviet military tribunal, found guilty of war crimes, sentenced to death, and executed.
