= Haßmersheim =

- Municipality
- Coat of arms

- Location of Haßmersheim within Neckar-Odenwald-Kreis district
- Interactive map of Haßmersheim
- Location within Germany Location within Baden-Württemberg
- Coordinates: 49°18′1″N 9°8′57″E
- Country: Germany
- State: Baden-Württemberg
- Admin. region: Karlsruhe
- District: Neckar-Odenwald-Kreis
- Subdivisions: 3

Government
  - Mayor (2021–29): Christian Ernst (Ind.)

Area
  - Total: 19.15 km^{2} (7.39 sq mi)
- Elevation: 145 m (476 ft)

Population (2025-12-31)
  - Total: 5,129
  - Density: 267.8/km^{2} (693.7/sq mi)
- Time zone: UTC+01:00 (CET)
  - Summer (DST): UTC+02:00 (CEST)
- Postal codes: 74855
- Dialling codes: 06266, 06261 (Hochhausen)
- Vehicle registration: MOS, BCH
- Website: www.hassmersheim.de

Haßmersheim (South Franconian: Hassmerse or Hassemse) is a municipality in the district of Neckar-Odenwald-Kreis, in Baden-Württemberg, Germany.

== Administration ==
Haßmersheim consists of three subdivisions:

- Haßmersheim, population 3,649
- Hochhausen, population 730
- Neckarmühlbach, population 532
