= Jane Bernigau =

Female Nazi concentration camp guard (1908–1992)

Gerda "Jane" Bernigau (5 October 1908 – 23 March 1992) was an SS Oberaufseherin in Nazi concentration camps before and during World War II.

== Camp work ==
Bernigau was born on 5 October 1908, in Sagan, Germany (now Żagań, Poland). She worked in orphanages as a young woman.

In 1938, she joined the camp staff at the Lichtenburg early camp in eastern Germany. There, because of her willingness to get her job done, she was eventually promoted to chief wardress (Oberaufseherin) over the vast system of Gross-Rosen women's satellite camps. In May 1939, Bernigau was sent to Ravensbrück concentration camp as a guard.

In September 1942 (or 1943), Bernigau was sent as a wardress to the Mauthausen-Gusen concentration camp satellite camp at Sankt Lambrecht. Bernigau was posted to the Gross-Rosen concentration camp in 1944 as chief wardress and dealt with the initial training of female guard candidates until they were dispersed out to Langenbielau/Reichenbach for completion of their course.

She was awarded the Kriegsverdienstkreuz II. Klasse ohne Schwerter medal in 1944 for her devotion to the Third Reich and her camp services, and she had tremendous power over her subordinate female guards as well as the women prisoners in the sub-camps. In her 2008 book, A Narrow Bridge to Life, Bella Gutterman wrote: "The commander of Gross-Rosen inspected the camps frequently and went on field trips to choose appropriate locations for new camps. SS Chief Supervisor Jane Bernigau did a stint in Gross-Rosen and sometimes accompanied the commander on visits that had been chosen for new camps. She also joined him in visits to camps and factories where the employment of prisoners had to be regularized."

== Evasion of justice ==
In February 1945 Bernigau accompanied male SS leaders from Gross-Rosen to Reichenau, from where she fled during May 1945, and was never prosecuted for war crimes.

After the war she lived in West Germany. According to the German historian Isabell Sprenger, Bernigau was several times interrogated by the authorities, for the last time in 1976. She died in Husum in March 1992 at the age of 83.

== Sources ==
- Brown, Daniel Patrick (2002). The Camp Women: The Female Auxiliaries Who Assisted the SS in Running the Nazi Concentration Camp System. Schiffer Publishing. ISBN 0-7643-1444-0.
- Isabell Sprenger: Aufseherinnen in den Frauen-Außenlagern des Konzentrationslagers Groß-Rosen, Werkstatt Geschichte 12, Ergebnisse Verlag, Hamburg 1995, s. 21-33
