= Magda Hellinger =

Czechoslovak teacher (1916–2006)

Magda Hellinger (1916–2006) was a Jewish woman who, during World War II as a prisoner, at Auschwitz-Birkenau, saved dozens of women from certain death.

Hellinger was born in eastern Czechoslovakia to a father who taught Jewish history and German. He imparted his skills in German to his daughter, which she would put to use in Auschwitz. Interested in Zionism from an early age, she joined a Zionist youth organization, and worked as a kindergarten teacher.

In March 1942, she was sent to Auschwitz, where she was given administrative roles over the prisoners, then became a top cam supervisor in Birkenau. Some survivors accused her of working with the Nazis, others defended her and that she did what she could to help. After the War, Magda lived in Israel and later moved to Australia.

Hellinger died in 2006 at age 89 a few years after she had self-published her memoir and had given testimony, which was taped on a few occasions. After her death, her daughter Maya Lee (with the help of a co-writer, David Brewster) added to that memoir after doing more research. She published The Nazis Knew My Name in 2022.

== Bibliography ==
- Magda Hellinger, Maya Lee, and David Brewster. The Nazis Knew My Name: A Remarkable Story of Survival and Courage in Auschwitz. Atria, 2022. ISBN 9781982181239.
