= Stollberg =

- Town
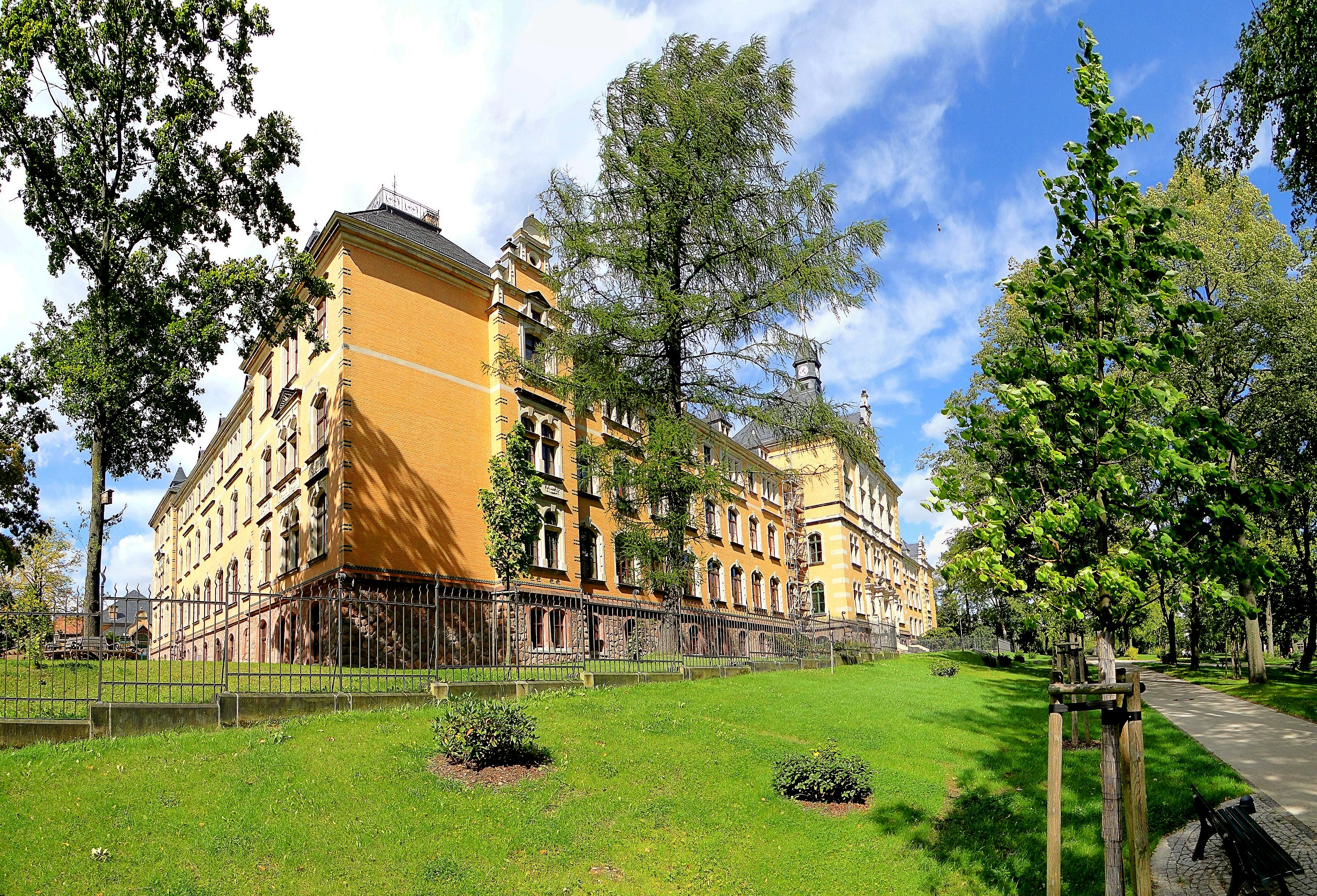
- Carl von Bach Gymnasium

- Coat of arms

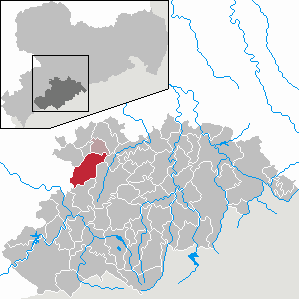
- Location of Stollberg within Erzgebirgskreis district
- Interactive map of Stollberg
- Location within Germany Location within Saxony
- Coordinates: 50°42′30″N 12°46′42″E
- Country: Germany
- State: Saxony
- District: Erzgebirgskreis
- Subdivisions: 7

Government
  - Mayor (2017–24): Marcel Schmidt

Area
  - Total: 38.99 km^{2} (15.05 sq mi)
- Elevation: 464 m (1,522 ft)

Population (2025-12-31)
  - Total: 11,031
  - Density: 282.9/km^{2} (732.8/sq mi)
- Time zone: UTC+01:00 (CET)
  - Summer (DST): UTC+02:00 (CEST)
- Postal codes: 09366
- Dialling codes: 037296
- Vehicle registration: ERZ, ANA, ASZ, AU, MAB, MEK, STL, SZB, ZP
- Website: www.stollberg-erzgebirge.de

Stollberg (German pronunciation: [ˈʃtɔlˌbɛʁk]) is a town in Saxony, Germany, in the district Erzgebirgskreis. It is situated 20 km east of Zwickau and 17 km southwest of Chemnitz. It was the site of the Hoheneck women's prison until 2001.
