= Elfriede Rinkel =

German concentration camp guard deported from the United States

- Born: Elfriede Lina Huth; July 14, 1922; Leipzig, Germany
- Died: July 2018 (aged 95–96); Willich, Germany
- Occupation: Guard at the Ravensbrück concentration camp

Elfriede Lina Rinkel (née Huth; 14 July 1922 – July 2018) was a German Nazi guard at the Ravensbrück concentration camp from June 1944 until April 1945, known for using an SS-trained guard dog to abuse prisoners.

After the war she fled to the United States and married a German Jewish man who she claimed never knew about her role in the Holocaust. In 2004 she was discovered and in 2006 she was deported to Germany on suspicion of Nazi-sponsored persecution, but all criminal proceedings were dropped. She was never tried and died in a nursing home.

== Atrocities at Ravensbrück concentration camp ==
Ravensbrück was the Nazis' largest concentration camp for women. There, 132,000 women and children (and 20,000 men) were imprisoned. In 1945, while Rinkel worked there, thousands of prisoners were killed on the orders of the SS in the gas chambers.

== Post-war marriage and trials ==
She left Germany for the United States and was admitted as an immigrant on or around 21 September 1959 in San Francisco, California. At a German-American club in San Francisco she met Fred William Rinkel, a German Jew whose family had been murdered in the Holocaust, and they married about 1962. Together, they mixed in Jewish circles, attended synagogue and donated to Jewish charities. Fred died in 2004 and was buried in a Jewish cemetery. Rinkel stated she never told her husband of her past.

Eventually, the Office of Special Investigations uncovered her whereabouts, and approached her on 4 October 2004. Rinkel confessed to having worked in the Ravensbrück concentration camp from June 1944 until April 1945, as a voluntary dog handler: this activity was better paid than the ordinary work of supervisors. She claimed that she did not use her dog as a weapon against prisoners, and that she did not join the Nazi Party. However, other information contradicts this: "One prisoner reported that women were even worse than men in commanding their dogs to brutally attack inmates." Rinkel claimed to have always behaved correctly. Insa Eschebach, a historian and the director of the Museum of the Ravensbrück concentration camp, deemed this a protective claim. Dogs could be used recklessly. Some guards let the animals go on prisoners, on whom they, with sometimes fatal consequence, inflicted severe bite wounds.

Since other crimes were barred, the Central Office of the State Justice Administration for the Investigation of National Socialist Crimes in Ludwigsburg examined only whether it is possible to prove whether Rinkel murdered any inmates. If that could be proved, it risked a life sentence. The Simon Wiesenthal Center in Jerusalem insisted on a trial.

On 1 September 2006 Rinkel was deported to Germany under a settlement agreement signed in June 2006 after being charged by a federal law requiring removal of aliens who took part in acts of Nazi-sponsored persecution filed by the Justice Department's Office of Special Investigations (OSI) and the United States Department of Homeland Security's Immigration and Customs Enforcement (ICE). The German authorities were informed by the American authorities after her departure and she did not challenge her denaturalisation.

Assistant Attorney General Alice Fisher issued a statement, saying that: "Concentration camp guards such as Elfriede Rinkel played a vital role in the Nazi regime's horrific mistreatment of innocent victims. This case reflects the government's unwavering commitment to remove Nazi persecutors from this country." The San Francisco Jewish community and her neighbours were shocked when the statement was released about Elfriede's past.

After her deportation, Kurt Schrimm from the Central Office of the State Justice Administrations for the Investigation of National Socialist Crimes stated that her files were given to the prosecutor in Cologne. All criminal proceedings were eventually closed due to missing initial suspicion. She spent some time on a farm in the Rhineland with distant relatives, then moved into a nursing home in Willich, Northrhine-Westfalia, where she died in July 2018.
