= Johanna Langefeld =

Nazi concentration camp guard (1900–1974)

- Born: Johanna May; 5 March 1900; Kupferdreh, German Empire
- Died: 26 January 1974 (aged 73); Augsburg, West Germany
- Occupation: Concentration camp guard

Johanna Langefeld (née May; 5 March 1900, Kupferdreh, Germany – 26 January 1974) was a Nazi German guard and supervisor at three Nazi concentration camps: Lichtenburg, Ravensbrück, and Auschwitz. She was arrested and imprisoned for her role in the Holocaust, but she escaped prison and was never tried.

== Early life and Nazism ==
Born in Kupferdreh (now Essen, Germany), Johanna May was brought up in a Lutheran, nationalistic family alongside a sister. She was named after a German heroine figure, Johanna Stegen. Her father was a blacksmith. Her parents instilled her and her sister with values of strict discipline and Kinder, Küche, Kirche.

In 1924, she moved to Mülheim and married Wilhelm Langefeld, who died in 1926 of lung disease. In 1928, Langefeld fell pregnant with another man, left him soon afterward, and moved to Düsseldorf, where her son, Herbert Langefeld, was born that August.

Langefeld was unemployed until age 34, when she began to teach domestic economy in an establishment of the city of Neuss. Satisfied to have a secure career inline with traditional gender roles, she became an adherent of Adolf Hitler partially because he preached that traditional gender roles would make Germany great again. From 1935 onwards, she worked as a guard in a so-called Arbeitsanstalt (working institution) in Brauweiler Abbey, which was a prison for prostitutes, unemployed and homeless women, and other so called "antisocial" women, who were then later imprisoned in concentration camps. Langefeld did not join the Nazi Party until 1937, when the Brauweiler director fired her for resistance to his authority, which included her lack of party membership.

== Nazi concentration camps ==
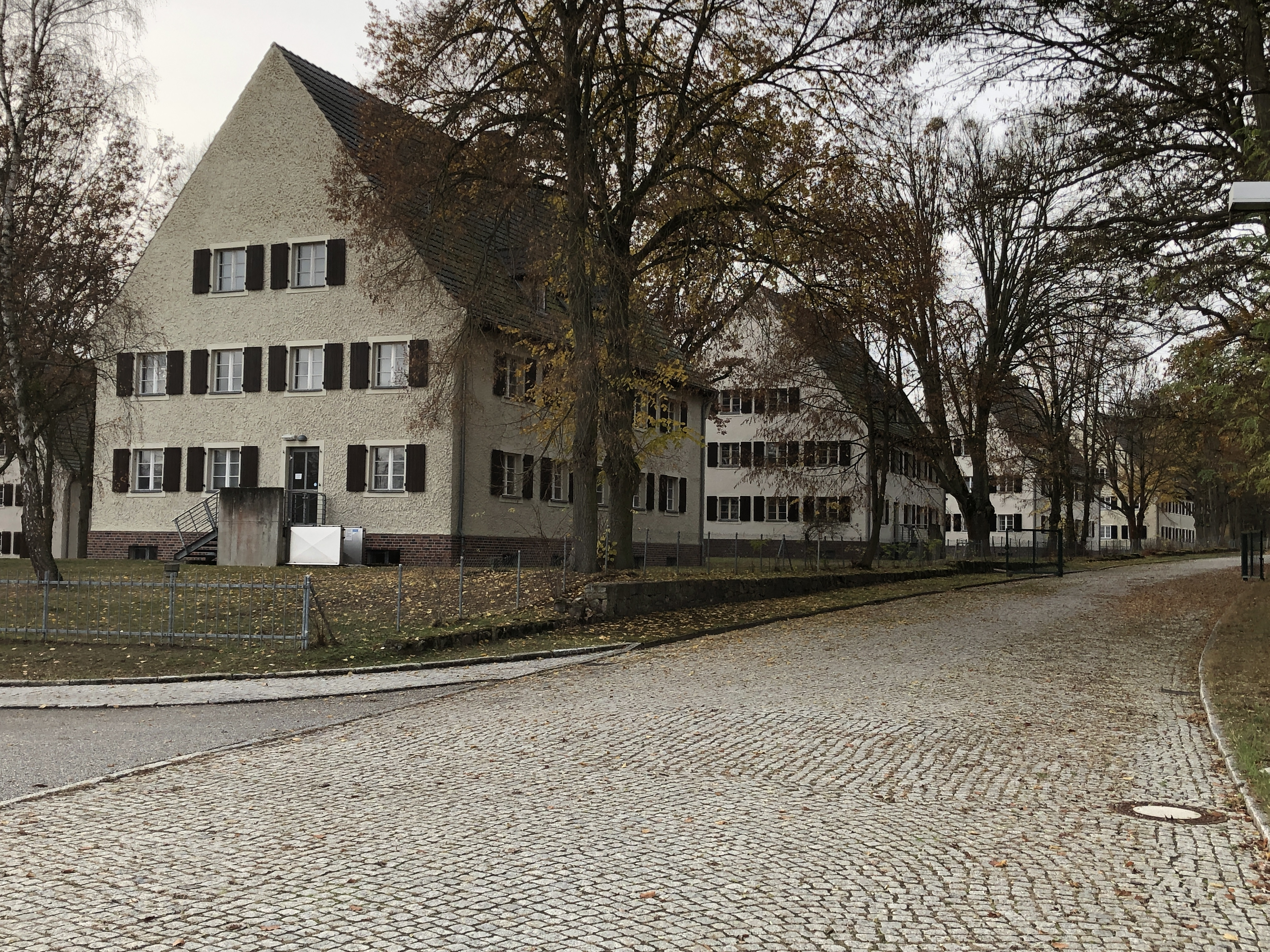
Guard barracks at Ravensbrück

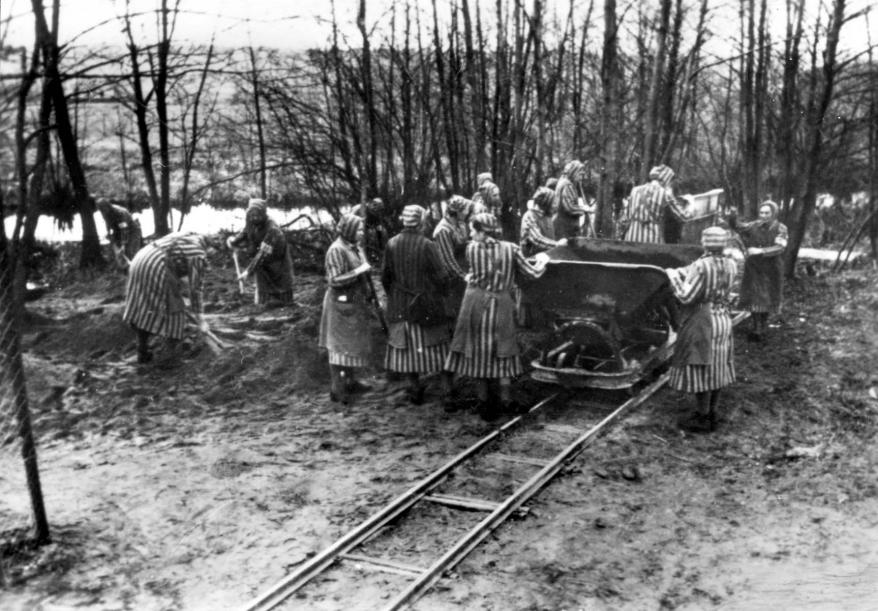
Prisoners at Ravensbrück

In March 1938, Langefeld applied for a job as a camp guard in the first Schutzstaffel (SS) concentration camp for women in Lichtenburg. After one year, she became the female superintendent of this camp, where she stayed until the camp population was transferred to Ravensbrück in May 1939. There, she clashed with camp director Max Koegel, who she believed incompetent and whose job she wanted for herself. While Koegel preferred to keep discipline through beatings, Langefeld believed emphasizing strict protocol was the superior method for controlling female prisoners. Her power struggle with him led her to recruit Blockova loyal only to her to help maintain control of the prisoner population. When Koegel entreated Heinrich Himmler to authorize the use of a wooden horse to aid in beatings, Langefeld protested to no avail. This escalation of punishment led to her developing a guilty conscience, but she did not cease her Nazi activities.

She was in charge of the selections in Ravensbrück during the so-called "14f13” murder campaign. In March 1942, Langefeld was assigned to build a new women's camp in Auschwitz. There, she selected prisoners for death in the gas chamber.

Rudolf Höss, the Commandant of the Auschwitz concentration camp, recalled his contact with Johanna Langefeld as follows:

The chief female supervisor of the period, Frau Langefeld, was in no way capable of coping with the situation, yet she refused to accept any instructions given to her by the leader of the protective custody camp. Acting on my own initiative, I simply put the women's camp under his jurisdiction.

During the visit of Himmler on 18 July 1942, Langefeld tried to get him to annul this order. In fact, Rudolf Höss admitted after the war that “the Reichsführer SS absolutely refused” his order and that he wished “a women's camp to be commanded by a woman”. Himmler ordered that Langefeld should stay in charge of the women's camp and that in the future, no SS man should enter the female camp.

That month, the Auschwitz women's camp was moved to Auschwitz-Birkenau camp three kilometres away. Two weeks later, Langefeld sustained an injury of her meniscus and required a cartilage operation in the Hohenlychen SS Sanatorium near Ravensbrück. During her stay there, she went to see Oswald Pohl, the chief of the SS Main Economic and Administrative Office, in Berlin-Lichterfelde, and convinced him to transfer her back to Ravensbrück.

Maria Mandl became the new Oberaufseherin of the women's prisoner camp in Auschwitz. Oswald Pohl instructed the Chief of Department D of his SS Main Economic and Administrative Office, Richard Glücks, to order that duties of protective custody camp leaders in the Women's Camps be executed thereafter by the female superintendents, the Oberaufseherinnen.

Margarete Buber-Neumann, who became Langefeld's prisoner assistant in Ravensbrück, recorded that Langefeld was dismissed for excessive sympathy with Polish prisoners; she was separated from her son, taken under arrest to Breslau, where an SS tribunal prepared a trial against her. Langefeld never went to trial, and was released from her camp duties. She then moved to Munich and started to work for BMW.

== Trial, later life and death ==
On 20 December 1945, Langefeld was arrested by the U.S. Army, and in September 1946, was extradited to the Polish judiciary preparing a trial in Kraków against SS personnel in Auschwitz. On 23 December 1946, she escaped from prison. Given her prior relatively positive treatment of inmates in this German Nazi concentration camp located on occupied Polish soil, the escape was assisted by Polish staff of the prison where she was held. After the escape she hid in a convent, working in a private home. Sometime around 1957, she returned illegally to live with her sister in Munich. During 1957, she tracked down Buber-Neumann to her home in Frankfurt to apologize in hopes of absolution. At this point, she was missing multiple teeth. She died in Augsburg, Germany, on 26 January 1974, aged 73.

== Personality and brutality ==
Langefeld had a complicated view of contemporary German gender roles. Though she was raised with the belief women should be subordinate to men and was attracted to Hitler for his endorsement of such ideas, she also pushed against patriarchal relationships in her professional life. She strongly believed her life would have been better had she been born male. Growing up, she idolized Eleonore Prochaska, a historical German woman who dressed as a man to fight in the War of the Sixth Coalition.

Though she held some degree of sympathy toward the prisoners under her charge and believed herself to have had a connection with Buber-Neumann, she was also passionately antisemitic. She visibly scowled when looking at Jewish prisoners (a former Ravensbrück prisoner recalled that “her face would fill with hatred”) and never complained about the killing of Jews in the Holocaust. She hated Koegel's disciplinary methods of long, gratuitous beatings, but her own methods were also violent: imposing strict rules either impossible to obey or resulting in long periods of discomfort and having guards kick and slap prisoners for infractions to keep them constantly on their toes. Langefeld herself would sometimes slap prisoners for emphasis. However, she never struck prisoners out of anger.

== See also ==
- Female guards in Nazi concentration camps
