= Ulla Jürß =

Nazi war criminal

Ulla Erna Frieda Jürß (born 2 August 1923) was a Nazi and concentration camp guard. It is unclear in her file when Jürß became a camp guard (estimated between 1942 and 1944).

Jürß was born in Rabenhorst, Germany. She went to Ravensbrück concentration camp where she was trained as an Aufseherin and served in several capacities. She was later promoted to the rank of Blockführerin, and had over 600 women under her control. She was reportedly a brutal block overseer in the camp. In October 1944 she was relieved from duty and went back home.

She was not tracked down until 1966, and until then, lived quietly in East Germany. That year, she was charged with crimes against humanity. An East German court found her and two other former guards, Ilse Göritz and Frida Wötzel, and sentenced them to life imprisonment. After the reunification of Germany, Jürß was released on health grounds in May 1991. After her release, she has also filed a petition for rehabilitation and compensation for the time she spent in prison. This petition was denied, however. It is not known whether Jürß is still alive.
