= Elisabeth Volkenrath =

Nazi concentration camp supervisor

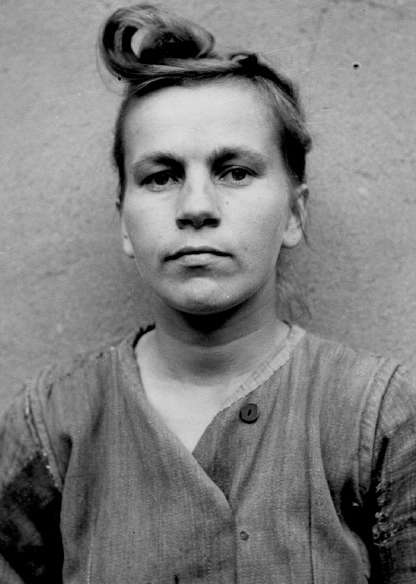
- Volkenrath in 1945
- Born: Elisabeth Mühlau; 5 September 1919; Schönau an der Katzbach, Prussia, German Republic
- Died: 13 December 1945 (aged 26); Hamelin Prison, Allied-occupied Germany
- Known for: War crimes
- Political party: Nazi Party (1941–1945)
- Status: Executed by hanging
- Motive: Nazism
- Conviction: War crimes
- Trial: Belsen trial
- Penalty: Death
- Military career
- Allegiance: Nazi Germany
- Branch: SS-Gefolge
- Rank: Oberaufseherin; SS-Helferin
- Units: Ravensbrück; Auschwitz; Bergen-Belsen

Elisabeth Volkenrath (née Mühlau; 5 September 1919 – 13 December 1945) was a German supervisor at several Nazi concentration camps during World War II.

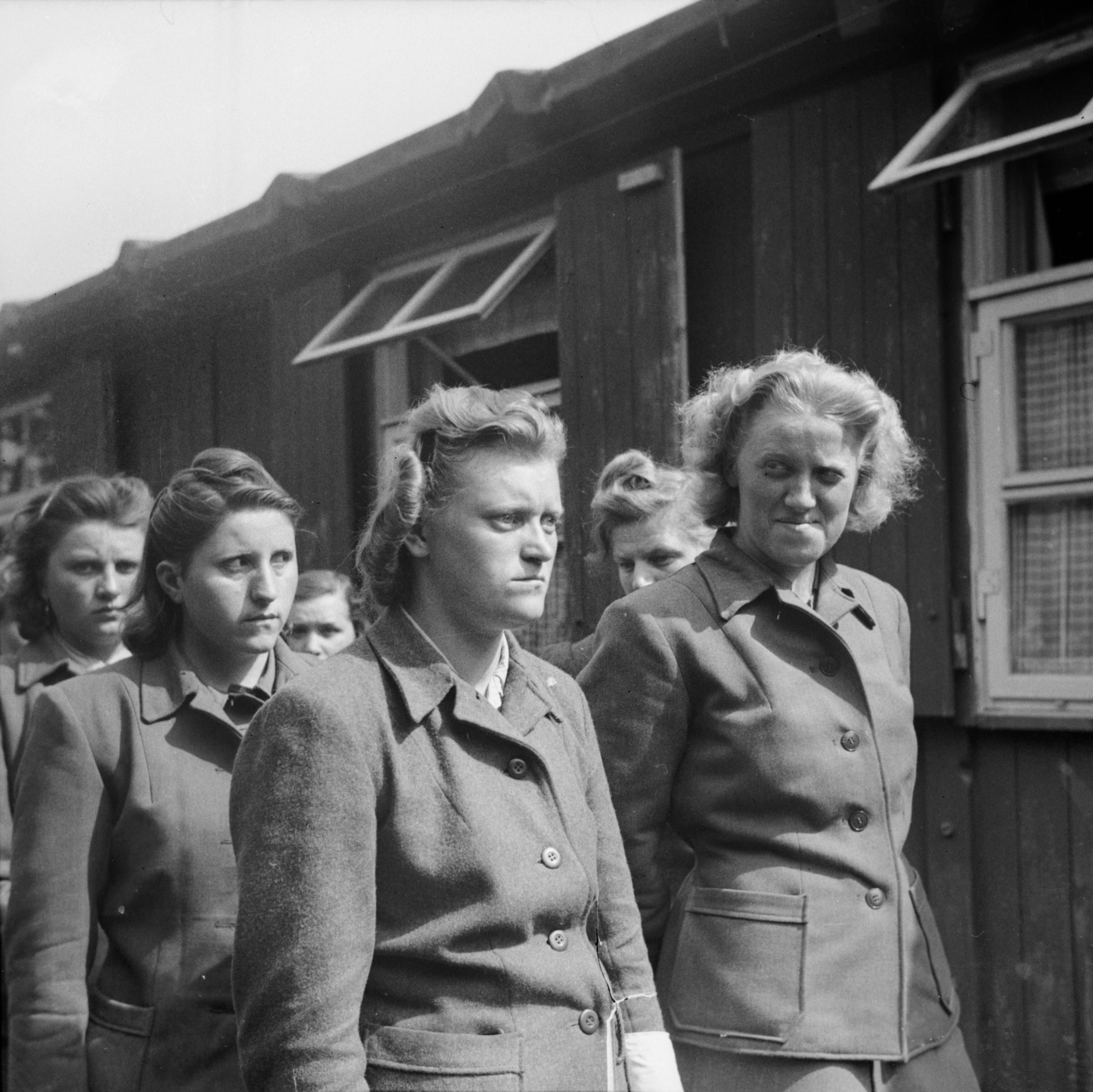
Among SS women camp guards at Bergen-Belsen, including Herta Bothe and Irene Haschke

Volkenrath, née Mühlau, was an ungelernte Hilfskraft (unskilled worker) when she volunteered for service in a concentration camp. In October 1941 she began working at Ravensbrück concentration camp as a guard. In March 1942, she was sent to Auschwitz concentration camp where she worked in the same function as at Ravensbrück. At Auschwitz, she met SS-Rottenführer Heinz Volkenrath, who had worked there since 1941 as SS-Blockführer. The couple married in 1943. She participated in the selection of prisoners for the gas chambers and, in November 1944, was promoted to Oberaufseherin (supervising wardress) for all camp sections for female prisoners at Auschwitz.

Volkenrath was transferred to Bergen-Belsen when Auschwitz was closed. From February 1945, she was Oberaufseherin at Bergen-Belsen.

== Belsen trial and execution ==
In April 1945, Volkenrath was arrested by the British Army, and was tried in the Belsen trials, at which she was convicted of war crimes. She claimed during her testimony that "it was really awful in the camps, but it was awful for us too. We were punished just like the prisoners." Sentenced to death, she was the first woman to be executed by hanging at Hamelin Prison by British official executioner Albert Pierrepoint on 13 December 1945 at 09:34.

== See also ==
- SS-Totenkopfverbände – Branch of the SS that managed the Nazi camps (1936–1945)
- Concentration Camps Inspectorate – SS administrative authority for concentration camps
- List of Nazi concentration camps
- Nuremberg principles – Guidelines for determining what constitutes a war crime
- Denazification – Allied initiative to remove Nazism
- Women in Nazi Germany – Nazi policies regarding the role of women in German society
