= Locations of executions conducted by Albert Pierrepoint =

Albert Pierrepoint (1905–1992) was the most prolific British hangman of the twentieth century, executing 434 men and women between 1932 and 1955. This table records the locations of each of the executions he participated in, the numbers in brackets being the number of executions he was assistant executioner at (often assisting his uncle, Thomas Pierrepoint), the other numbers are those in which he officiated as chief executioner.

Apart from his work within the United Kingdom, Pierrepoint also conducted executions at Dublin's Mountjoy Prison in the Irish Free State and the later Republic of Ireland; for the British colonial authorities in Gibraltar; in the Suez Canal Zone, Egypt; at Graz-Karlau Prison in Austria; and most famously in the British occupation zone of Germany, at Hamelin, where he executed 156 Nazi war criminals.

== Locations ==
The executions conducted by Albert Pierrepoint (as Chief Executioner, in brackets as Assistant Executioner)
Location	Years 1932 to 1955																								Total
Location	32	33	34	35	36	37	38	39	40	41	42	43	44	45	46	47	48	49	50	51	52	53	54	55	Total
Bedford	–	–	–	(1)	–	–	–	–	(1)	–	–	–	–	–	–	–	–	–	–	–	–	–	–	–	2
Crumlin Road, Belfast	–	(1)	–	–	–	–	–	–	–	–	(1)	–	–	–	–	–	–	–	–	–	–	–	–	–	2
Winson Green, Birmingham	–	(2)	–	–	(1)	–	–	–	(2)	–	–	–	–	–	–	–	–	1	1	2	2	–	–	1	12
Bristol	–	–	–	–	–	–	–	–	–	–	–	–	–	–	–	1	–	–	2	–	1	2	–	–	6
Cardiff	–	–	–	–	–	–	–	–	–	–	–	–	–	–	–	–	1	–	–	–	2	–	–	–	3
Durham	–	–	–	–	(1)	–	–	–	(3)	–	(1)	–	1	–	–	–	–	–	1	–	–	–	–	–	6
Saughton, Edinburgh	–	–	–	–	–	–	–	–	–	–	–	–	–	–	–	–	–	–	–	1	–	–	2	–	3
Exeter	–	–	–	–	–	(1)	–	–	–	–	–	–	–	–	–	–	–	–	–	–	–	–	–	–	1
Barlinnie, Glasgow	–	–	–	–	–	–	–	–	–	–	–	–	–	–	–	–	–	–	2	–	2	1	–	–	5
Gloucester	–	–	–	–	–	–	–	(1)	–	–	–	–	–	–	–	–	–	–	–	–	–	–	–	–	1
Hull	–	–	(1)	–	–	–	–	–	–	–	–	–	–	–	–	–	–	–	–	–	–	–	–	–	1
Armley, Leeds	–	–	–	–	–	–	–	–	–	–	–	–	–	–	–	–	–	–	–	–	–	1	–	–	1
Leicester	–	–	–	–	–	–	–	–	–	(1)	–	–	(2)	–	–	–	–	–	–	–	–	1	–	–	4
Lincoln	–	–	–	–	–	–	–	–	–	–	–	–	–	–	–	–	–	1	–	1	1	–	1	1	5
Walton, Liverpool	–	(1)	–	–	–	–	(1)	–	–	–	–	–	–	–	3	–	1	1	1	–	2	1	1	2	14
Holloway, London	–	–	–	–	–	–	–	–	–	–	–	–	–	–	–	–	–	–	–	–	–	–	1	1	2
Pentonville, London	–	–	–	–	–	–	–	–	(3)	1	2	1	4	9	4	3	1	3	2	1	5	2	2	–	43
Wandsworth, London	–	–	(2)	–	–	–	(1)	(1)	–	2 (2)	8	6	1	5	8	2	–	3	1	3	2	3	3	1	54
Strangeways, Manchester	–	–	–	–	–	(1)	(1)	–	–	–	–	–	–	–	–	1	–	1	2	3	2	2	1	–	14
Norwich	–	–	–	–	–	–	–	–	–	–	–	–	–	–	–	–	1	–	1	2	–	–	–	–	4
Oxford	–	–	–	–	–	–	–	–	–	–	(1)	–	–	–	–	–	1	–	–	–	1	–	–	–	3
Perth	–	–	–	–	–	–	–	–	–	–	–	–	–	–	–	–	1	–	–	–	–	–	–	–	1
Shepton Mallet	–	–	–	–	–	–	–	–	–	–	–	(2)	(2)	(3)	–	–	–	–	–	–	–	–	–	–	7
Shrewsbury	–	–	–	–	–	–	–	–	–	–	–	–	–	–	–	–	–	–	–	1	2	–	1	–	4
Swansea	–	–	–	–	–	–	–	–	–	–	–	–	–	–	–	–	–	2	1	–	–	–	1	–	4
Winchester	–	–	–	–	–	–	–	–	–	–	–	–	–	–	–	–	–	1	2	1	–	–	–	–	4
Mountjoy, Dublin	(1)	–	–	–	–	(1)	–	(1)	–	(3)	–	(2)	(1)	1	–	1	1	–	–	–	–	–	1	–	13
Gibraltar	–	–	–	–	–	–	–	–	–	–	–	–	2	–	–	–	–	–	–	–	–	–	–	–	2
Suez Canal Zone, Egypt	–	–	–	–	–	–	–	–	–	–	–	–	–	–	–	–	–	–	3	–	1	–	–	–	4
Hamelin, Germany	–	–	–	–	–	–	–	–	–	–	–	–	–	13	53	69	55	11	–	–	–	–	–	–	201
Karlau, Graz, Austria	–	–	–	–	–	–	–	–	–	–	–	–	–	–	8	–	–	–	–	–	–	–	–	–	8
Total	1	4	3	1	2	3	3	3	9	9	13	11	13	31	76	77	62	25	19	15	22	13	14	6	434

== Notable executions ==
=== Second World War ===
- A total of 156 German war criminals executed between 1945 and 1949, following a series of war trials e.g. the Hamburg Ravensbrück Trials (16 executions between 1947 and 1949) and the Stalag Luft III murder trials, which resulted in 13 executions on 27 February 1948.

The list of condemned includes Johanna Bormann (Auschwitz); Irma Grese, the youngest concentration camp guard to be executed for crimes at Bergen-Belsen concentration camp and Auschwitz (aged 22); and Elisabeth Volkenrath (Bergen-Belsen and Auschwitz); plus another ten men including Josef Kramer (Camp Commandant at Belsen) and Fritz Klein, plus Georg Otto Sandrock and Ludwig Schweinberger, who had both been condemned for murdering Pilot Officer Gerald Hood of the RAF (while Hood was a POW) at Almelo, Netherlands, on 21 March 1945. Of the 13, 11 were condemned at the Belsen Trial and two others (Sandrock and Schweinberger) at a separate trial in Almelo.

All were subsequently executed on the gallows in a purpose-built room at Hamelin Prison on 13 December 1945 at roughly half-hour intervals. The women were hanged individually, the men in pairs. The first execution started at 9.34 am and the last was completed by 4.17 pm. Executing a large number of war criminals in a single day was not unusual for Pierrepoint. For example, he performed the following eleven executions at Hamelin prison on 8 October 1946, which resulted from the Neuengamme War Crimes Trial earlier the same year:

- Adolf Speck
- Alfred Trzebinski
- Andreas Brems
- Anton Thumann
- Bruno Kitt
- Heinrich Ruge
- Johann Reese
- Max Pauly
- Wilhelm Dreimann
- Wilhem Bahr
- Willy Warnke

=== Others ===
- Gordon Cummins, the "Blackout Ripper": Executed at Wandsworth Prison on 25 June 1942.
- August Sangret, the "Wigwam Murderer": Also executed at Wandsworth Prison on 29 April 1943.
- Charlie Kerins, Chief of Staff of the Irish Republican Army, for the murder of Garda Síochána policeman Dennis O'Brien. Hanged on 1 December 1944 in Mountjoy Prison, Dublin.
- John Amery, son of wartime Secretary of State for India Leopold Amery, and the first person to plead guilty to treason in an English court since Summerset Fox in May 1654. He was described by Pierrepoint as "the bravest man I ever hanged". According to the official prison record of the execution, later released and now stored in the National Archives, Amery greeted his executioner with the words "Oh! Pierrepoint", but the executioner took the proffered hand only to put the pinioning strap on, making no reply. However, this account is disputed, as Pierrepoint himself later stated in interview that the two men spoke at length and he felt that he had known Amery "all his life", and there is a story that Amery greeted Pierrepoint with, "Mr. Pierrepoint, I've always wanted to meet you. Though not, of course, under these circumstances!" Hanged at Wandsworth Prison, London, 19 December 1945.
- "Lord Haw-Haw", William Joyce, convicted as a traitor and executed at Wandsworth, 3 January 1946.
- Bruno Tesch, co-inventor of the insecticide Zyklon B used in the Holocaust. Convicted of the crime of complicity in the murder of interned allied civilians by means of poison gas by a British military tribunal at the Curiohaus in Rotherbaum, Hamburg. Executed on 16 May 1946 in Hamelin prison.
- Neville Heath, the "Lady killer" executed at Pentonville on 16 October 1946.
- John George Haigh, the "Acid-bath murderer" executed at Wandsworth on 10 August 1949.
- Timothy John Evans, hanged at Pentonville Prison on 9 March 1950 for the murder of his daughter (he was also suspected of having murdered his wife). Timothy Evans received a posthumous pardon in 1966 for the murder of his daughter. It was subsequently discovered that the perpetrator was Evans' neighbour, John Reginald Christie, who turned out to be a serial killer. He was executed by Pierrepoint on 15 July 1953 at Pentonville. This wrongful execution is acknowledged as a major miscarriage of justice and was a contributing factor for the suspension of the death penalty in Britain in 1965 and its eventual abolition.
- James Corbitt, hanged at Strangeways Prison on 28 November 1950 for the murder of his ex-mistress. Corbitt was a regular at Pierrepoint's pub Help The Poor Struggler.
- James Ronald Robertson, was convicted of murdering Catherine McCluskey, with whom he was conducting an extramarital affair; he was hanged on 16 December 1950 at Barlinnie Prison. Robertson was a constable with Glasgow Police and the only serving police officer executed in Britain in the 20th century.
- James Inglis, on 8 May 1951, the fastest hanging on record – a total of seven seconds elapsed from the time that Inglis left the Condemned Cell.
- Derek Bentley, executed at Wandsworth on 28 January 1953 for his part in the death of Police Constable Sidney Miles. The execution was carried out despite pleas for clemency by large numbers of people, including 200 members of parliament, the widow of Miles, and the jury's recommendation in the trial. After a 45-year-long campaign, Bentley received a posthumous pardon in July 1998, when the Court of Appeal ruled that Bentley's conviction was "unsafe" and quashed it. An article written by Pierrepoint for The Guardian, but withheld until the pardon was granted, dispelled the myth that Bentley had cried on his way to the scaffold. To the last, he believed he would be reprieved.
- Michael Manning, Irish rapist and murderer, last person to be executed in the Republic of Ireland, and one of four condemned men the Irish government had hired Pierrepoint to execute after having failed to train its own hangman. Executed at Mountjoy Prison in Dublin on 20 April 1954.
- Ruth Ellis, the last woman to be executed in Britain, for the murder of her lover. Executed at Holloway Prison on 13 July 1955. Pierrepoint had no regrets about her execution; it was one of the few times he spoke publicly about one of his charges and he made it clear he felt she deserved no less.
- Louisa May Merrifield, executed at Strangeways Prison in 1953 for poisoning her elderly employer Mrs Sarah Ann Ricketts.

== Sources ==
- Fielding, Steve (2008). "Appendix 2: List of Executed Persons". Pierrepoint: A Family of Executioners. John Blake. ISBN 978-1-84454-611-4.
