= Stanley Cross =

Stanley Cross may refer to:

- Stanley Cross (executioner), English executioner
- Stan Cross, Australian political cartoonist
