= James Inglis (murderer) =

British man executed for murder

- Born: c. 1922; Scotland
- Died: 8 May 1951 (aged 29); Strangeways Prison, Manchester, England
- Status: Executed by hanging
- Conviction: Murder (20 April 1951)
- Penalty: Death

James Inglis (c. 1922 – 8 May 1951) was a Scottish man executed for murder, at the age of 29.

Having confessed to strangling Alice Morgan, a 50-year-old woman who was working as a prostitute in Kingston upon Hull on 1 February 1951 after a quarrel over payment, Inglis opted to plead insanity at his trial. The jury did not believe his version of events, and on 20 April he was sentenced by Mr Justice Ormerod to be hanged. He was gaoled at Strangeways Prison to await execution. Because Inglis did not appeal against his sentence, execution was scheduled to take place only three weeks after the trial ended (according to law, after the passage of three Sundays).

On the morning of 8 May 1951, the executioner, Albert Pierrepoint and his assistant, Syd Dernley, escorted Inglis from his cell to the gallows immediately adjacent, and hanged him without delay. This was the fastest British hanging on record, taking just seven seconds from the time that Inglis was removed from his cell to the moment that the trapdoor opened. Dernley later related that Inglis practically ran to his execution, following the prison guard's advice to go quickly and "without fuss".

Inglis's execution is featured in the 2006 film Pierrepoint; although Inglis's name is not mentioned, the character "Maximovsky" was supposed to represent him.
