= Gordon Cummins =

British serial killer who exploited wartime blackouts (1914–1942)

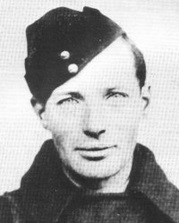
- Gordon Frederick Cummins, c. 1941
- Born: 18 February 1914; New Earswick, North Riding of Yorkshire, England
- Died: 25 June 1942 (aged 28); HMP Wandsworth, London, England
- Cause of death: Execution by hanging
- Other names: The Blackout Killer; The Blackout Ripper; The Wartime Ripper
- Occupation: Royal Air Force serviceman
- Height: 5 ft 7 in (170 cm)
- Spouse: Marjorie Stevens (m. 1936)
- Parent(s): John Cummins; Amelia Lee
- Status: Executed
- Allegiance: United Kingdom
- Motive: Sexual sadism; Robbery; Rage
- Conviction: Murder (28 April 1942)
- Penalty: Death

Details
- Victims: 4–6
- Span of crimes: 12 October 1941 or 9 February 1942 – 13 February 1942
- Date apprehended: 14 February 1942

Gordon Frederick Cummins (18 February 1914 – 25 June 1942) was a British serial killer known as the Blackout Killer, the Blackout Ripper and the Wartime Ripper, who murdered four women and attempted to murder two others over a five-day period in Central London in February 1942. He is also suspected of committing two earlier murders in October 1941.

Convicted of the murder of 33-year-old Evelyn Oatley, Cummins was sentenced to death on 28 April 1942; he was hanged at HMP Wandsworth on 25 June, and is the only convicted murderer in British criminal history known to have been executed during an air raid.

All the victims of the Blackout Ripper were strangled, with the bodies of three of his victims extensively mutilated at the point of or after death. The murders themselves have been described by one former detective superintendent within the Metropolitan Police as "by far the most vicious" he ever investigated during his entire career.

Cummins became known as the "Blackout Killer" and the "Blackout Ripper" because he committed his murders during the imposed wartime blackout and because of the extensive mutilations inflicted upon his victims' bodies. He is also known as the "Wartime Ripper" as his murders were committed at the height of World War II.

== Early life ==
Gordon Frederick Cummins was born in New Earswick, North Riding of Yorkshire, on 18 February 1914, the first of four children born to John Cummins and his wife Amelia (née Lee). Cummins's father was a civil servant who ran a school for delinquent youths; his mother was a housewife. As a child, Cummins received a private education in Llandovery, South Wales, although contemporary reports from his years at the Llandovery County Intermediate Secondary School describe his academic performance as unremarkable, with teachers later recollecting he was much more preoccupied with socialising than his studies. Nonetheless, Cummins did obtain a diploma in chemistry at age sixteen. After completing his schooling in 1930, Cummins attended Northampton College of Technology, where he was again a lackadaisical student. He abandoned his studies on 1 November 1932, determined to establish a career on his own terms.

At the age of eighteen, Cummins moved to Newcastle, where he briefly worked as an industrial chemist. He was dismissed from this employment after five months. In August 1933, Cummins found work as a tanner in Northampton, although he was fired from this employment for poor timekeeping after thirteen months, thereafter briefly alternating between part-time work and casual labour. In October 1934, Cummins relocated to London and obtained a job as a leather dresser in a clothing factory, earning £3 a week (the equivalent of approximately £188 as of 2026). He later trained to become a foreman at this firm.

While residing in London, Cummins developed a desire to live the life of an aristocrat. He frequented hotels and clubs in the West End, falsely claiming to acquaintances to be the illegitimate son of a peer and to be receiving an allowance from this fabled individual. To support this contention, Cummins refined his accent to imitate that of an Oxfordian, invariably smoked expensive cigarettes, and insisted on being referred to as "the Honourable" Gordon Cummins. He frequently engaged in acts of theft or embezzlement to financially maintain this facade, and regularly bragged to colleagues of his sexual excursions with local women. To his employers, Cummins's extravagant lifestyle impacted his work performance, and he was fired from his job on 8 February 1935. Shortly thereafter, he moved into his brother's flat in Queens Mews, Bayswater, as he considered his next career move.

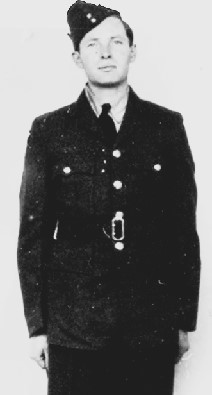
Cummins, c. 1941

=== Royal Air Force ===
In November 1935, Cummins volunteered to join the Royal Air Force (RAF). He enlisted at the Air Crew Reception Centre in Regent's Park, London, where both serving members of the RAF and new recruits were assessed for training. Cummins initially trained as a rigger, tasked with undertaking pre-flight checks on aircraft. He was regarded by his superiors as an ambitious individual, although his boastful attitude and false claims of bastard nobility made him unpopular with many of his fellow servicemen, who viewed him as somewhat vain and derisively nicknamed him "the Duke." In May 1936, Cummins became acquainted with Marjorie Stevens (b. 10 March 1915), the secretary of a West End theatre producer, at an Empire Air Day event in the village of Henlow. Following a seven-month courtship, the couple married at the Paddington Register Office on 28 December and moved into their own flat. They had no children. (Note: According to author Penny Pembroke, a daughter named Delcyia Lee was born to the couple in June 1939, but given for adoption shortly after her birth.)

Initially, Cummins was stationed with the Marine and Armament Experimental Establishment at Felixstowe, Suffolk. Between 1936 and 1939, he relocated with this military research and test organisation to Scotland. On 25 October 1939, shortly after the outbreak of the Second World War, Cummins was transferred to Helensburgh, Dunbartonshire. He remained stationed in Dunbartonshire until April 1941, when he was posted to Colerne, Wiltshire, where he was billeted off base and resided with a local farmer. At this posting, Cummins reached the junior rank of leading aircraftman, although he held aspirations to become a Spitfire pilot. (Note: While Cummins was stationed at Colerne, three women were assaulted by an unknown airman in separate incidents. Two of these assaults occurred in Bath, and one in Ford. In each instance, the victim was unable to provide a description of her attacker. It is unknown whether Cummins was the perpetrator of any of these assaults.)

On 10 November 1941, Cummins was posted to Cornwall. At this new posting, his braggadocio among his fellow airmen earned him the nickname "the Count." While stationed in Cornwall, Cummins joined a Falmouth social club named the Blue Peter Club and occasionally assisted the proprietress by tending the bar. However, he was relieved of his bartending duties within weeks when found to be serving free drinks to RAF personnel. Shortly thereafter, the proprietress discovered that approximately £35 worth of jewellery had been stolen from her apartment. Although both she and local police suspected Cummins of committing this theft, no evidence was found to prove his guilt.

The following January, having accrued over 1,000 hours of flight experience, Cummins appeared before the RAF selection board to take an aviation exam. His exemplary performance earned him a transfer to the Air Crew Receiving Centre in Regent's Park, where he was to be stationed with 300 other men. Cummins was ordered to report for duty at 10 a.m. on 2 February 1942.

== Murders ==
Cummins is known to have murdered at least four women and to have attempted to murder two others over a period of five days in February 1942. He is also suspected of previously murdering two other women in October 1941. The majority of his known victims were women who he encountered in or near to West End pubs and clubs and who engaged in prostitution—typically with servicemen. (Note: The arrival of American servicemen in England following America's entry into the war in December 1941 saw an increase in prostitution in several British cities. Many prostitutes are known to have increased the price they charged for sexual services to military personnel of any nationality.)

All of Cummins's known murders and attempted murders were committed in London during wartime blackout conditions, imposed in September 1939. (Note: The blackout had been imposed in Britain on 1 September 1939, just two days before Britain and France declared war on Germany. All households were instructed to draw drapes of dark-coloured material across all windows at the onset of dusk, with instructions these drapes could not be washed, as washing the garments would make them more permeable to light. Bus and taxi drivers were also instructed to cover their headlights in a manner which allowed only minimal visibility.) By the time of his arrest, Cummins had accrued neither a previous criminal record nor a known history of violence.

=== First suspected murders ===
Cummins is suspected of committing his first two murders in October 1941. At the time of these two murders, Cummins was stationed in Colerne, although when on leave, he is known to have frequently visited London, residing at an address in nearby St John's Wood.

==== Maple Churchyard ====
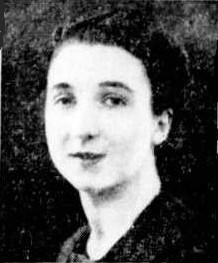
Maple Churchyard

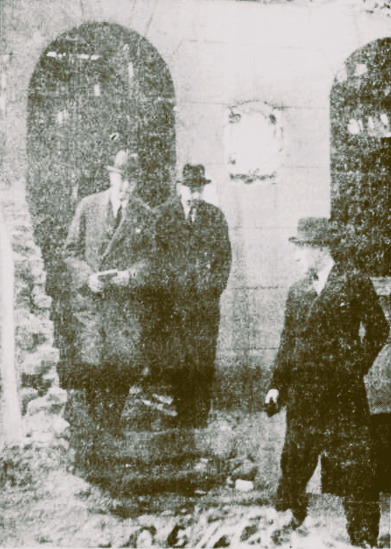
Sir Bernard Spilsbury (left), pictured at the crime scene of the murder of Maple Churchyard

Cummins's first suspected victim was a 19-year-old clerk named Maple Churchyard, who was murdered at approximately 9:15 p.m. on the evening of 12 October. Churchyard resided with her parents in Tufnell Park, Islington. Although she spent many evenings volunteering as a helper in a West End services canteen, she is known to have frequently engaged in casual sexual relations with servicemen whom she typically encountered in the vicinity of Tottenham Court Road. She was last seen alive at Charing Cross Station by a friend named Vera Whymark approximately thirty minutes before her murder, intending to catch a bus home.

Churchyard's nude body was found by demolition workmen in a bombed house on Hampstead Road the day after her murder. She had been strangled to death with her own camiknickers by an individual described by the pathologist who examined her body as being a left-handed individual, as the bruising around Churchyard's neck indicated her murderer had more strength in his left hand than his right. In addition, her handbag had been emptied, with several of its contents missing. Churchyard had not been sexually assaulted and her body had not been mutilated.

==== Edith Eleanora Humphries ====
Five days later, on 17 October, a 48-year-old widow named Edith Eleanora Humphries was found lying on her bed at her home on Gloucester Crescent, Regent's Park—less than one mile from the site of Churchyard's murder. She had been extensively bludgeoned about the face and head before her assailant had attempted to strangle her before cutting her throat. Humphries had also suffered a single stab wound to her skull, which had penetrated her brain. She was still alive at the time of her discovery, but died shortly after her admission to hospital. The door to her property was ajar, and investigators found no signs of a forced entry to her home. Several items of jewellery had been stolen.

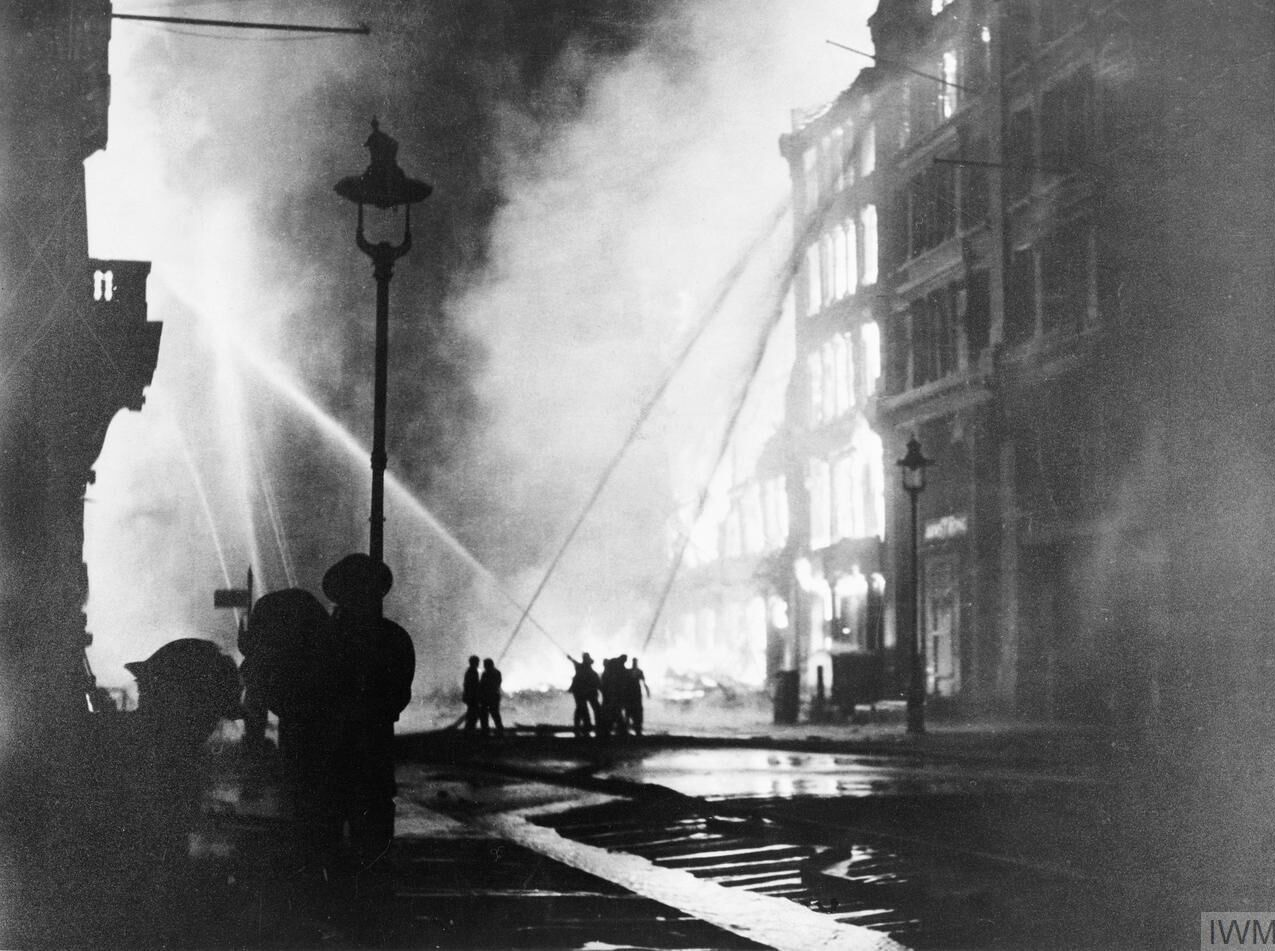
The air raids upon London and other British cities throughout World War II resulted in enforced nighttime blackout measures

=== Blackout murders ===
On Saturday 7 February 1942, Cummins left an RAF establishment in St John's Wood to visit his wife at the flat they rented in Southwark. The following evening, he borrowed a £1 note from his wife (the equivalent of approximately £41 as of 2026), explaining that he was "hard up" and that he intended to visit the West End for a "night on the town." Cummins left his home shortly after 6:30 p.m.

==== Evelyn Margaret Hamilton ====
The following morning, the body of 41-year-old pharmacist Evelyn Margaret Hamilton was discovered by an electrician named Harold Batchelor in a street-level air raid shelter in Montagu Place, Marylebone. Hamilton lay on her back with her body strewn across a gutter running through the centre of the shelter, her head turned to the left, and her swollen tongue protruding from her mouth. Her clothes had been disarranged and her scarf wound about her head. Scuff marks on her shoes and broken sections of mortar scattered near her body indicated Hamilton had fiercely struggled with her attacker, who had raised her skirt above her hips, pulled her underwear below knee level, and exposed her right breast. Her handbag—containing approximately £80—had been stolen, although some of the contents were found strewn about the pavement outside the air raid shelter. Hamilton's empty handbag was later found by a police officer on nearby Wyndham Street. No fingerprints were recovered from any of her possessions. A mortuary photograph of Hamilton was identified by her landlady, Catherine Jones, on 10 February; her body was formally identified by her younger sister, Kathleen, one day later.

Hamilton's post-mortem revealed she had been manually strangled by a left-handed individual with such force the cricoid cartilage on both sides of her larynx had been fractured. She had not been sexually assaulted or mutilated, although numerous small cuts and scratches had been inflicted to her right breast and a cut measuring one inch had been inflicted to her left eyebrow.

The day prior to her murder, Hamilton had resigned from her position managing a Hornchurch chemists, which had experienced financial hardships due to the onset of the war, and travelled to Central London via train. At 6:40 p.m. on 8 February, she is known to have informed a Mrs. Maud Yoxall of her plans to leave London and travel to Lincolnshire the following day, as she had been offered a managerial position at a pharmacy in Grimsby, but would be spending one final night in London. She was last seen alive by a waitress at the Maison Lyons Corner House in Marble Arch shortly before midnight, drinking a glass of white wine to celebrate her 41st birthday. The location of her body led investigators to conclude she had been either accosted or attacked as she walked back to her boarding house in the early hours of the following morning, and that her assailant had evidently dragged her body from the street into the air raid shelter.

==== Evelyn Oatley ====
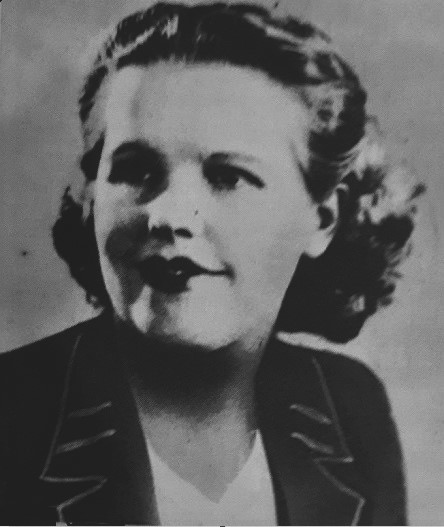
Evelyn Oatley

Shortly after 8:30 a.m. on 10 February, two meter readers discovered the naked and mutilated body of 33-year-old Evelyn Oatley lying diagonally across her bed in her flat at 153 Wardour Street, Soho. She had been beaten about the mouth and chest, then strangled into unconsciousness before a six-inch cut had been inflicted to her throat, severing her right carotid artery. Oatley's head hung over the edge of her bed, with a considerable amount of blood having flown from the wound to her throat onto the floor. Her abdomen, genitalia and thighs had been extensively mutilated with a safety razor blade and a tin opener both at the point of and after death. Six of these wounds had been inflicted around her vaginal cavity, the jagged nature of which suggested they had been inflicted with the tin opener, which lay beside her left leg. (Note: The forensic pathologist who conducted Oatley's autopsy stated his opinion that the incision wounds to her throat had been inflicted "in the position in which she was found with her head hanging over the side of the bed". Furthermore, the external wounds to her genitalia had been inflicted while Oatley had been alive but "at the point of death".) Oatley had also been sexually violated with her own electric torch, which protruded from her vagina, although she had not been raped. A pair of blood-smeared curling tongs was also found close to her body, and a bloodstained Ever-Ready razor blade lay to the left of her head. In addition, the contents of Oatley's leather handbag were strewn across the floor of her bedroom, a box containing an Ever-Ready safety razor was discovered upon her washbasin, and seven unused Gillette safety razor blades were recovered from the small nightstand beside her bed. The door to Oatley's apartment had been closed but not locked. No defensive wounds were found upon Oatley's hands, nails or arms.

Detective Chief Superintendent Frederick Cherrill was able to determine that the fingerprints recovered from the bloodstained tin opener and a single thumbprint located upon the corner of a broken section of mirror which had also been used to mutilate Oatley's body and was found within her leather handbag, indicated that her murderer was a left-handed individual. No match for this set of fingerprints could be found within the police fingerprint bureau, indicating Oatley's murderer had no police record.

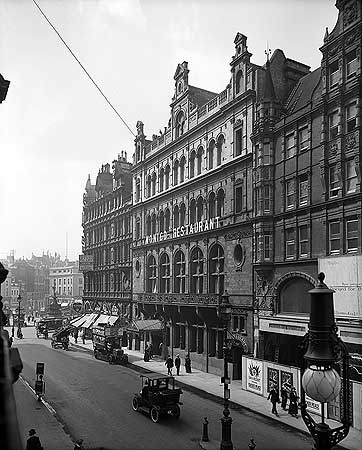
The Café Monico, seen here in 1915. Oatley encountered Cummins outside these premises at approximately 11:35 p.m. on 9 February.

Three eyewitnesses later informed investigators Oatley had been approached by a young, clean-shaven and moustachioed airman with chestnut brown hair and who had been approximately 5 ft 8 in (170 cm) in height, as she stood outside the Café Monico on Shaftesbury Avenue late in the evening prior to her murder. According to these witnesses, when Oatley had asked this individual what his sexual preferences were, he had simply replied, "I like blondes." Oatley was last seen alive by a fellow tenant of 153 Wardour Street named Ivy Poole, who observed her enter the stairwell to the property in the company of this individual at approximately 11:40 p.m. According to Poole, shortly after midnight, she was awoken by the sudden increase in the volume of Oatley's wireless. Poole overheard a BBC news announcer broadcasting a midnight bulletin from the Pacific theatre, followed by a music programme; she did not investigate this disturbance. Shortly thereafter, the wireless volume was turned down.

Oatley was a married woman and former Windmill Girl who, at the outbreak of World War II, had turned to prostitution, using the alias 'Nita Ward,' (Note: Some sources state Oatley's alias to be Leta Ward.) to supplement the income she earned as a nightclub hostess. She had relocated to London from Blackpool in the summer of 1939, and informed her husband of the fact she earned money via prostitution at the end of 1941. Oatley would only engage in prostitution on occasions her husband—who frequently travelled to London to visit his wife—was not present in the capital. Her body was formally identified by her husband the day after her murder.

==== Margaret Florence Lowe ====
In the early hours of Wednesday, 11 February, a 43-year-old prostitute named Margaret Florence Lowe was murdered in her flat at 11 Gosfield Street, Marylebone. She was last seen alive by her neighbour, Florence Bartolini, at approximately 1:15 a.m. walking along the corridor to her flat in the company of a client. Approximately one hour later, Bartolini heard the man exit Lowe's flat, walk down the corridor and onto Gosfield Street, whistling to himself. Lowe's body remained undiscovered until the afternoon of 13 February, when her 15-year-old daughter, Barbara, visited her mother only to be told by a neighbour her mother had not been seen for "two or three days" and that a parcel had remained unclaimed outside her door for the same length of time.

Lowe was found on her divan bed, with the quilts above her body and raised to just below her chin. She lay on her back with her legs positioned apart, her knees bent upwards and a used condom positioned close to a pool of blood near her groin. An autopsy revealed she had been extensively beaten, then strangled to death upon her bed with a silk stocking which was still knotted beneath the right side of her jaw. Froth was visible around her nose and mouth.

Upon examining Lowe's body, forensic pathologist Sir Bernard Spilsbury remarked that the injuries inflicted by her murderer were "quite dreadful," adding that the perpetrator was "a savage sexual maniac" who "indulged in a wicked lust to perpetrate the most diabolical injuries on the women he killed." The mutilations inflicted to Lowe surpassed the savagery of those her murderer had inflicted upon Oatley, with some mutilations inflicted while the victim had still been alive, although at the point of death. She had been beaten about the face and head before her body had been extensively slashed and mutilated with a variety of implements including a razor blade, a vegetable knife, a table knife and a broken poker, all of which were found protruding from or beside her body. (Note: Having concluded Lowe's autopsy, Sir Bernard Spilsbury stated the vegetable knife had been the utensil her murderer had used to inflict the majority of the mutilations to her body.) Her abdomen had been opened, exposing her internal organs, with one further wound inflicted to the right side of her groin being "a deep, gaping wound" measuring ten inches in length. A large serrated bread knife protruded from a wound close to Lowe's groin, a wax candle had also been inserted six inches into her vagina and her uterus had been slashed. Spilsbury was also able to determine the injuries inflicted to Lowe's body left little doubt her murderer had also been responsible for the death of Evelyn Oatley.

Forensic experts recovered fingerprints from the base of a glass candlestick holder standing upon the bedroom mantelpiece, plus a glass tumbler and a half-drunk bottle of Hammerton's oatmeal stout also found at the crime scene. The fingerprints upon the glass candlestick holder—from which the wax candle inserted into Lowe's vagina had been extracted—were found to belong to the perpetrator's right hand, indicating the perpetrator was left-handed.

Lowe was a widowed mother of one who hailed from Southend-on-Sea. Following the death of her husband in 1932, Lowe had sold the family fancy goods business. She later enrolled her daughter, Barbara, in a boarding school before relocating alone to London, where she obtained employment as a house cleaner in 1934. Shortly thereafter, using the alias 'Peggy Campbell,' she began to engage in prostitution—typically encountering her clients in the vicinity of Charing Cross Road. (Note: Due to her refined speech and penchant for wearing felt hats and fur coats, Lowe was also known among West End prostitutes as 'The Lady.') Every third weekend, Barbara would travel to London from Southend via train to visit her mother, and Lowe would devote her weekend to social activities such as visiting the cinema and local landmarks with her daughter.

==== Catherine Mulcahy ====
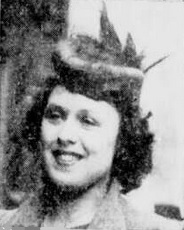
Catherine Mulcahy

On Thursday, 12 February, Cummins accosted a 22-year-old prostitute named Catherine Mulcahy in Regent Street. Mulcahy—who used the alias 'Kathleen King'—agreed to take Cummins to her flat in nearby Southwick Street. The two travelled to her flat via taxi, with Cummins giving her the agreed fee of £2 in advance. Upon entering her flat, Mulcahy lit her gas fire and began removing her clothes, but did not remove her boots. (Note: The evening of 12 February had seen snowfall in Central London, and the weather was markedly cold. Mulcahy had kept her boots on as she undressed to avoid her feet coming into contact with the cold floor.) She later informed police that a "strange smile" appeared on Cummins's face as she removed her clothing, lay upon her bed and beckoned him to join her. Cummins removed his clothes, then approached Mulcahy and clambered atop her; he then immediately slammed his knees into her diaphragm—knocking the wind from her lungs—and attempted to strangle her as he pinned her body to the bed with his own weight. Mulcahy fought her attacker, briefly attempting to dislodge his grip before clawing at his wrists, then kicking him in the stomach with her boot, causing Cummins to fall headfirst to the floor beside her bed. Mulcahy then ran naked and screaming from her flat to that of a neighbour across the hallway as Cummins shouted for a match to illuminate the dimly-lit living room.

Possibly as a means of deterring Mulcahy from reporting the assault to police, Cummins partially dressed himself before approaching her neighbour's flat. He then gave her a further eight £1 notes, stating: "I'm sorry. I think I had too much to drink this evening" as Mulcahy repeatedly shrieked her belief he was a murderer. Cummins then grabbed his coat and fled, unwittingly leaving his RAF webbing belt at her address. Mulcahy reported this incident to police the following day.

==== Doris Elizabeth Jouannet ====
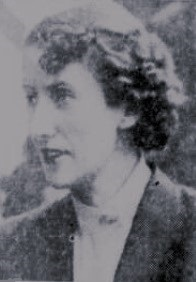
Doris Jouannet

Shortly after his assault upon Mulcahy, Cummins encountered 32-year-old Doris Elizabeth Jouannet (also known as 'Olga'). Jouannet was last seen alive at approximately 10:20 p.m. on 12 February by a friend named Beatrice Lang, with whom she drank a shot of whisky at a corner-house tearoom. According to Lang, Jouannet stated she intended to visit a regular client whom she referred to as "the Captain." The two then parted company on Oxford Street. Shortly thereafter, Jouannet encountered Cummins, accepted his proposal and took him to the two-room ground-floor flat at 187 Sussex Gardens, Bayswater, that she shared with her husband.

At 7 p.m. the following evening, Doris's husband, Henri, returned to the flat he shared with his wife. Noting the living room curtains had not been drawn and the bedroom door locked, he unsuccessfully attempted to pry the door open before phoning the police, who dispatched a constable named William Payne to the property.

Urging Henri to remain in the hallway, Payne pried the door open and turned on the light, discovering Jouannet's body—naked except for an open black nightgown—lying diagonally across the bed with her left hand placed between her legs. A silk stocking was knotted around her neck. Payne then exited the room, stating to Henri, "I must advise you not to go in that room." He then returned to Paddington police station to request the station officer alert Scotland Yard's Criminal Investigation Department and the divisional surgeon to his discovery.

Divisional Detective Leonard Clare arrived at Sussex Gardens shortly after 8 p.m. (Note: By 10:30 p.m., Detective Chief Inspector Edward Greeno and Detective Chief Superintendent Frederick Cherrill had also arrived at the crime scene.) His examination of the body at the crime scene revealed Jouannet's jaw had been broken before she had been strangled with the stocking knotted beneath the left side of her chin. Her abdomen, genitals, left breast and thighs were extensively mutilated with a razor blade and knife in a similar manner to the bodies of Oatley and Lowe. One of the wounds inflicted was a six-inch vertical gash extending between her navel and genitalia; another wound inflicted to her vagina measured six-and-a-half inches. Furthermore, the flesh beneath her left breast had been carved away. The knife used to mutilate Jouannet had been placed on her thigh; the Gillette razor blade had been placed on a dressing table in the corner of the room. Two used condoms lay on the floor beside the bed, and a gold watch and approximately £5 had been stolen from the flat. No clear fingerprints belonging to the perpetrator were recovered from the crime scene.

Spilsbury conducted Jouannet's post-mortem examination at Paddington mortuary on 14 February. Via examining the spillage of blood from Jouannet's wounds, he was able to determine the decedent had been strangled to the point of death before her murderer had first mutilated her breast and left thigh as she died. All other wounds had been inflicted after death. In reference to the nature of the wounds to the victim's body and the locations they had been inflicted, Spilsbury noted the murderer had exercised a degree of calculated restraint when disfiguring his victim above the navel, but that he had worked himself into an evident frenzy when mutilating her genitalia and thigh. Upon completing Jouannet's autopsy, Spilsbury remarked to Detective Chief Inspector Edward Greeno that he had a "madman on parade" before adding, "When you catch him, I'd like to know if he's left-handed."

Jouannet was known to resort only occasionally to street-level prostitution. She had married her elderly husband—who had previously been a dominatrix client of hers—in November 1935, and had remarked to other West End prostitutes that she would only sell sexual favours when she needed "a few extra shillings" to supplement the money given to her by her wealthy husband, who managed a hotel in Sloane Square. Jouannet would engage in prostitution when her husband slept overnight at the hotel, as his employment frequently required him to do.

=== Press coverage ===
Due to wartime restrictions on newsprint, the murders initially received only limited press coverage, largely because of the ongoing global conflict. Nonetheless, the murders quickly became the prime topic of conversation among West End prostitutes, many of whom became increasingly reluctant to offer their services to individuals they did not consider regular and trusted clients. Women who did not engage in prostitution became increasingly reluctant to walk the streets of the West End alone after dusk.

On 13 February, the bodies of both Lowe and Jouannet were discovered within two hours of each other. Both murders were soon linked to the murder of Oatley, and the perpetrator was dubbed by the press as the "Blackout Killer." The murders made headlines nationwide, with several international periodicals also drawing parallels between these murders and those earlier committed by Jack the Ripper.

==== Margaret Heywood ====
On the evening of 13 February 1942, Cummins encountered a young married woman named Margaret Heywood drinking alone at the Universelle Brasserie in Piccadilly Circus. After introducing himself and buying a round of drinks, the two engaged in conversation. Shortly thereafter, Heywood agreed to accompany Cummins to the London Trocadero for a drink and a sandwich. The two then walked in the direction of Haymarket. Heywood later stated that, at this point, Cummins became "unpleasantly forward" toward her: pushing her into a doorway near Piccadilly Circus and groping her waist as he attempted to persuade her to accompany him to a nearby air raid shelter. Heywood consented to a single kiss before informing Cummins she did not know of any nearby air raid shelters, stating, "In any case, I wouldn't go in one with you." Cummins then began fondling Heywood, who resisted, striking at his wrists and pushing his hands away from her body. She then attempted to leave; in response, Cummins seized her by the throat and pushed her back into the doorway. Heywood was then strangled into unconsciousness as Cummins repeatedly muttered the words, "You won't."

As Cummins rifled through Heywood's handbag, he was disturbed by an eighteen-year-old delivery boy named John Shine, who was carrying bottles of drink into the nearby Captain's Cabin pub, forcing Cummins to flee the scene, leaving his RAF-issue gas mask and haversack in the doorway. Shine immediately ran to Heywood's assistance. Noting Heywood had regained consciousness but was largely incoherent, Shine helped her to her feet before offering to accompany her to a hospital as Heywood began weeping. En route, the pair encountered a policeman named James Skinner, who suggested the two accompany him to West End Central Police Station to provide witness statements detailing Heywood's attack before an officer accompanied her to a nearby hospital.

Immediately after his attack on Heywood, Cummins visited a nearby pub, where he realised he had left his gas mask and haversack at the site of the attempted murder, and that the service number printed inside his haversack could be traced to him. In an effort to concoct an alibi, he stole another airman's gas mask and haversack before returning to base.

== Investigation ==
By 13 February, the vast majority of assaults and murders committed by Cummins had been linked to the same individual; however, although the Metropolitan Police had amassed ample physical evidence, they were unaware of the perpetrator's actual identity. In efforts to identify and apprehend the perpetrator, the Metropolitan Police deployed numerous uniformed and undercover police officers in both Paddington and Soho. Via a sting operation, undercover policewomen dressed as prostitutes were deployed to the square mile where the victims of the Blackout Ripper had first encountered their murderer, with male undercover officers deployed at discreet close locations.

Prior to providing his witness statement at West End Central police station, Shine handed the gas mask and haversack to investigators, explaining he had recovered the items from the doorway where he had found Heywood, who insisted the items had been in the possession of her assailant. A detective sergeant named Thomas Shepherd noted the RAF Regimental number (525987) printed on the inside of the haversack. Shepherd immediately contacted the Royal Air Force Police, who in turn contacted Cummins's regiment in Regent's Park. A staff sergeant quickly ascertained the gas mask and haversack had been issued to Cummins. This information was relayed to Shepherd at 11:30 p.m. on 13 February, with the staff sergeant adding Cummins was not at his billet. Shepherd instructed that Cummins be detained when he returned to his billet. He was detained as he attempted to sneak into his billet in the early hours.

=== Arrest ===
On the morning of 14 February, Detective Sergeant Shepherd formally questioned Cummins with regards to the assault upon Margaret Heywood. He claimed to have no memory of attacking her, stating he had spent the previous evening drinking Canadian rye whisky and bitter at the Volunteer pub in Baker Street with a corporal whose name he could not recall before the two took a taxi to Shaftesbury Avenue, where they continued drinking at the Universelle Brasserie. According to Cummins, at this location, he and the corporal drank some more bitter before he "went over to the spirit bar" where he drank several shots of both whisky and brandy before observing a woman "standing at the bottom of the stairs" whom he engaged in conversation and purchased a drink. He further claimed that due to his intoxication, he only held vague recollections of his conversations and time spent with this woman, although he did claim to have a "hazy recollection" of walking on the street in her company before realising in the early hours he had violated his curfew and immediately returned to base.

Cummins claimed to have no memory of actually attacking Heywood but expressed his regrets to having done so and offered to pay her compensation. Questioned as to why two of the knuckles upon his left hand were cut and bruised, Cummins claimed to have received the wounds while performing maintenance upon an aircraft engine.

Immediately after Cummins provided a written statement of his account of the previous evening's events, he was arrested and held on remand upon a charge of causing grievous bodily harm.

Map of Central London, depicting the locations of the four victims of the Blackout Ripper. The flashpoint depicts the location of the Air Crew Receiving Centre in Regent's Park; the yellow circles depict the locations of the attacks on Mulcahy and Heywood.

== Further enquiries ==
An examination of the entries within the billet pass-book on 15 February indicated Cummins had reported back to base before 10:30 p.m. on the dates of the murders and attempted murders investigators had ascribed to the Blackout Killer. However, many entries had been written in pencil, meaning they could easily have been doctored. Furthermore, several of Cummins's entries for the month of February were incomplete, as although he had invariably signed the pass-book when leaving base, he had frequently failed to sign in upon his return. Police questioning of fellow airmen revealed they had been in the habit of vouching for each other's return to base, and that Cummins had spent extravagantly in the week prior to his arrest. Although several of Cummins's roommates initially insisted they had seen him go to bed on the dates in question, and that he had been asleep when they awoke, Detective Chief Inspector Edward Greeno further discovered Cummins and another airman named Felix Sampson had left their billet via a fire escape connected to the billet's kitchenette after midnight on the dates of each of the murders, and both had not returned to base until the early hours of the morning.

A search of Cummins's possessions revealed he had taken various items belonging to the four murder victims linked to the Blackout Killer as keepsakes—the vast majority of which were of little value. One of the items had been a white metal cigarette case engraved with the initials L.W., which had belonged to Evelyn Oatley. This cigarette case—plus Oatley's gold wristwatch—was discovered hidden inside the kitchenette, alongside a photograph of Oatley's mother. Another cigarette case—discovered in Cummins's pocket at the time of his arrest—had belonged to Margaret Lowe. Also discovered were a fountain pen engraved with the initials of victim Doris Jouannet, and her comb—both discovered in a drawer at Cummins's billet and identified by her husband. Investigators also recovered a wristwatch with distinctive repairs which had also belonged to Jouannet, and a distinctive green pencil belonging to Evelyn Hamilton—plus a memo pad which bore the inscription "L.A.C. Cummins"—were later recovered from a dustbin.

Traces of blood were also recovered from a shirt retrieved from Cummins's kit bag, and the inner surface of his belt. Furthermore, an examination of the trouser turn-ups of Cummins's military uniform revealed traces of a distinctive brick dust mixture found at the air raid shelter in which Evelyn Hamilton's body was discovered. Chippings of this mortar were also recovered from Cummins's haversack.

Detective Chief Superintendent Frederick Cherrill was able to match the fingerprint of Cummins's left little finger and thumb with prints found upon the tin opener and broken mirror found near the body of Evelyn Oatley. Cherrill later confirmed fingerprints recovered from two other crime scenes belonged to Cummins. In addition, two of the ten £1 banknotes Mulcahy's attacker had given her before and after he had assaulted her were brand new. Via tracing the serial number of these banknotes, Greeno was further able to determine these two notes had been issued to Cummins on 12 February.

Both Heywood and Mulcahy were later asked to view a police lineup to identify their attacker. Mulcahy was unable to positively identify her attacker, although Heywood unhesitantly identified Cummins as the man who had assaulted her. Cummins continued to protest his innocence, claiming Heywood was mistaken and that another airman must have switched his own gas mask and haversack with his, and may have left the items at the site of the attempted murder in an effort to frame him.

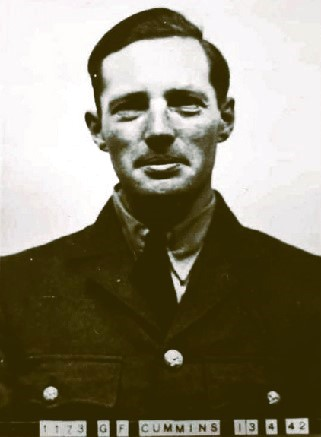
April 1942 mugshot of Gordon Cummins

=== Formal murder charges ===
On 16 February, Greeno drove to HM Prison Brixton to interview Cummins, who recounted his movements between 9 and 13 February. He vaguely inferred to having assaulted Margaret Heywood, but insisted he had never encountered any of the murder victims and claimed to be unable to recognise their photographs. When presented with the victims' personal belongings recovered among his own possessions, Cummins claimed the items had been "taken from a service respirator case I was carrying when arrested, but which was not mine". He then recounted his claim that he had either picked up the wrong haversack or that another airman had switched his own gas mask and haversack with his. Unconvinced of Cummins's claims, Greeno informed him he was to be charged with the murders of Oatley, Lowe, and Jouannet the following morning. He was held on remand at HM Prison Brixton, to await trial.

Cummins was further charged with assaulting Heywood and Mulcahy on 20 February; on this date, hearings were postponed until 12 March. Two weeks later, on 27 March, Cummins again appeared before a judge at Bow Street Magistrates' Court; on this occasion, he was further charged with the murder of Evelyn Hamilton. The Crown later decided to bring Cummins to trial solely for the murder of Evelyn Oatley.

== Trial ==
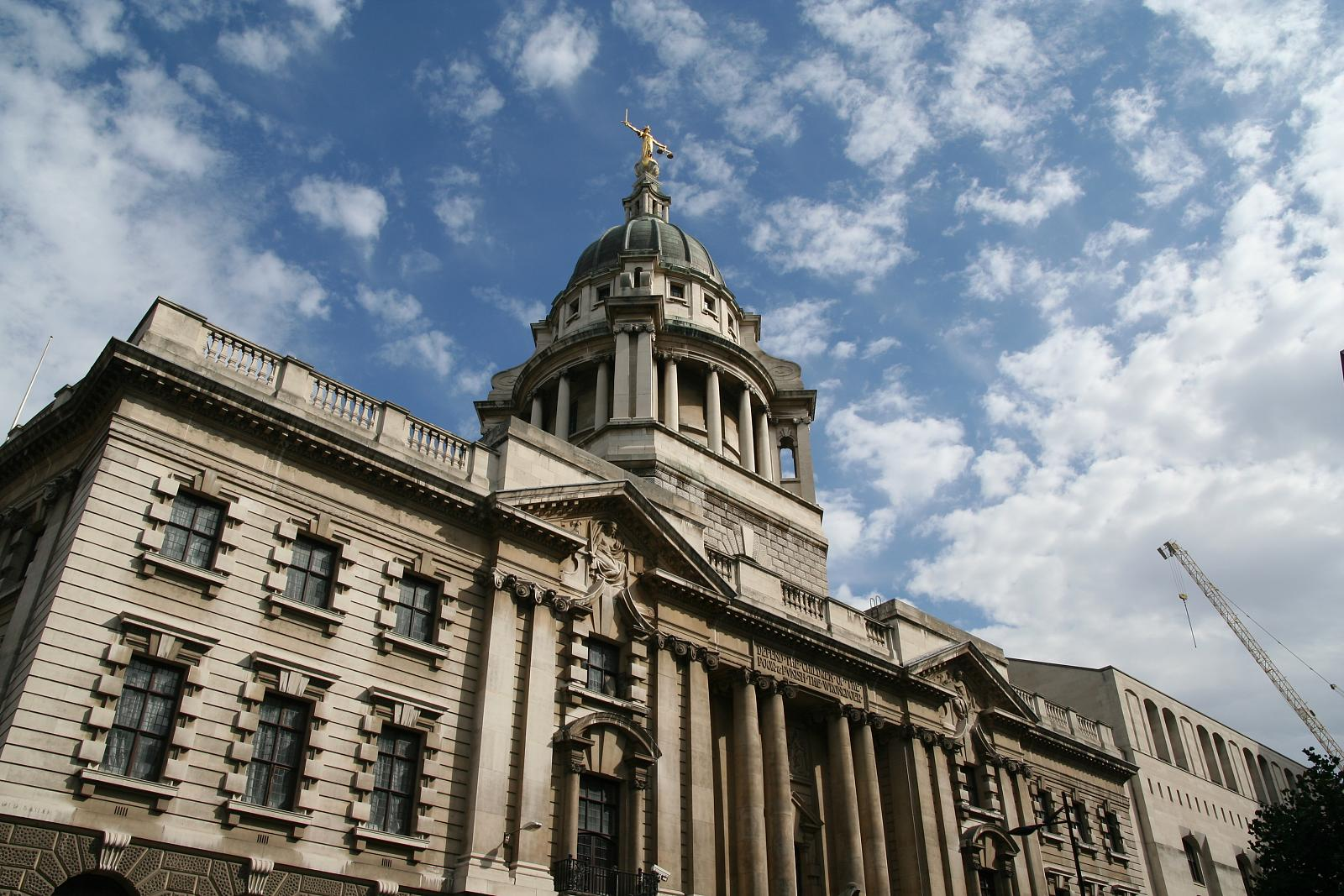
The Old Bailey, London. Cummins was brought to trial at this location on 24 April 1942.

The trial of Gordon Cummins for the murder of Evelyn Oatley began at the Old Bailey on 24 April 1942. He was tried before Mr Justice Asquith. Cummins entered a plea of not guilty to the charge against him; the clerk then informed the jury: "The prisoner at the bar, Gordon Frederick Cummins, is charged upon indictment with the murder of Evelyn Oatley on the tenth day of February this year. To this indictment he has pleaded that he is not guilty. It is your charge to say, having heard the evidence, whether he be guilty or not."

The prosecution consisted of Christmas Humphreys K.C. and G. B. McClure, K.C., with Denis Nowell Pritt K.C. initially appointed to defend Cummins. However, owing to a legal technicality on the first day of the trial (the presentation to the jury of crime scene exhibits pertaining to the murder of victim Margaret Florence Lowe as opposed to Oatley), the jury was excused from duty. The trial restarted before a new jury on 27 April, the defence now consisting of John Flowers K.C. and Victor Durand K.C. Cummins himself seemed largely uninterested in the legal proceedings; occasionally chatting in a light-hearted manner with his lawyers or turning from the bar to smile and wave at his wife, who attended every day of his trial and who steadfastly believed in his innocence.

=== Witness testimony ===
In his opening statement on behalf of the prosecution, Humphreys outlined the discovery of Oatley's body, the injuries inflicted to her body, the weapons her murderer had used to perform the mutilations and the fingerprints recovered at the crime scene. Referring to the prosecution's intention to link Cummins to this murder by the fingerprints investigators had recovered, Humphreys stated: "You will hear from one of the greatest experts in the country upon fingerprints. He will tell you that there have been some half-million fingerprints taken in this time and there have never been two alike. The prosecution would ask you to say, each one of you, that you are satisfied, on the evidence which will be called before you, and nothing else, that this man is the man who murdered Mrs. Oatley on the tenth of February."

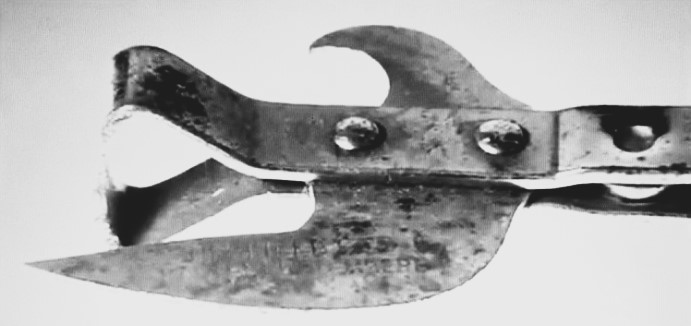
The tin opener used to mutilate the body of Evelyn Oatley. A fingerprint recovered from the handle of this utensil matched that of Gordon Cummins.

The first witness to testify on behalf of the prosecution was Detective Chief Superintendent Frederick Cherrill, who stated he was prepared to publicly stake his reputation that the fingerprints found upon the tin opener and broken mirror at the crime scene which had been used to extensively mutilate Oatley's body precisely matched those he had taken from Cummins following his arraignment on 17 February, adding he had found more than a dozen matching characteristics between the fingerprint impressions of Cummins's left little finger and the print lifted from the tin opener found at the crime scene, and more twenty-five matching characteristics between the impressions of Cummins's left thumb and the thumbprint recovered from the section of broken mirror recovered from Oatley's handbag.

Cherrill repeated these claims during cross-examination from John Flowers, who contended the fingerprint upon the tin opener was too faint to determine a precise identification, stating the quality of the fingerprint was typical for a fingerprint left upon a metal surface, and that any individual who touched the same surface would leave a fingerprint impression of the same quality. In response to further questioning as to discrepancies in the distance between points of identification upon the enlarged photographs of Cummins's fingerprints and those retrieved at the crime scene on display in the courtroom, Cherrill stated the points of discrepancy would appear "very great in an enlarged photograph," adding that original fingerprints can extend up to four millimetres depending on the degree of pressure to which they are subjected. In response to this explanation, Flowers asked Cherrill whether he was prepared to state the fingerprints belonged to Cummins "knowing that a man is being tried for his life"; Cherrill simply responded "Yes".

Sir Bernard Spilsbury followed Cherrill into the witness box to testify as to the post-mortem examination he had conducted upon Oatley's body. Spilsbury testified the cause of death had been the deep cut to her throat, that Oatley would have bled to death in less than five minutes, and that death had occurred at approximately 12:30 a.m. on the morning of the discovery of her body, although the actual time of her death could have been up to two hours before or after this time.

Felix Sampson then testified that between 10:30 and 11 p.m. on the night of Oatley's disappearance, he and Cummins had accosted two prostitutes outside the Café Monico in Piccadilly Circus. The two had agreed to reconvene outside the restaurant after "taking care of business." (Note: Prior to meeting Evelyn Oatley, Cummins solicited the services of a prostitute named Laura Denmark. Cummins had been unable to maintain a full erection in this encounter, and—via masturbation and sensual movements and gestures from Denmark—had gradually ejaculated inside a condom. He then thanked Denmark before apologising, stating he had "[drank] too much" that evening. Cummins then redressed and left Denmark's apartment. He is believed to have encountered Oatley approximately fifteen minutes later.) Sampson testified he had arrived back outside the restaurant at approximately 11:30 p.m. and had waited roughly twenty-five minutes for Cummins to appear before walking alone to a local pub. He had arrived back at St John's Wood at approximately 6 a.m., only to find Cummins asleep. When he later asked Cummins what time he had arrived back at the billet, Cummins had replied "about half-past three or four" in the morning, adding: "The woman I went with didn't satisfy me, so I went and found someone else."

=== Defendant's testimony ===
Cummins chose to testify in his own defence on 27 April. He denied any culpability in Oatley's murder; insisting he had been in the company of another woman on 10 February before returning to his billet. In reference to the fact sections of Sampson's testimony contradicted his own accounts of his movements on the evening of Oatley's death in his statement given to Detective Chief Inspector Greeno, Cummins admitted to having lied in his statement that he and Sampson had reconvened outside the Café Monico at approximately 10 p.m., adding the primary reason was that he had been afraid because Greeno had intimidated him in his initial questioning on 16 February, stating to him: "We have a rope around your neck, and we are going to hang you with it" after he had admitted having been in Oatley's company shortly before her murder, but had insisted she had been alive and well when he had last seen her. He also claimed to have been too drunk on the evening of her death to recall the precise timing of his whereabouts or actions, adding: "I had not a watch, myself. And, of course, in the dark, one cannot see public clocks."

"A sadistic sexual murder has been committed here of a ghoulish and horrible type, but of a type which is not at all uncommon, and that has been done by somebody. What you have to determine is whether, upon the evidence, it has been proved beyond reasonable doubt that the murderer was the man who stands in the dock. His life and liberty are in your hands, but in your hands, also, are the interests of society."

— Mr Justice Asquith, presenting his summation of the case to the jury prior to their deliberations. 28 April 1942.

Both counsels presented their closing arguments to the jury on 28 April. Upon completion of both counsels' closing arguments, Mr Justice Asquith delivered his final instructions to the jury. This address lasted for more than an hour, with the judge outlining key points presented by both prosecution and defence. At 4 p.m., the jury retired to consider their verdict.

== Conviction ==
The jury returned their verdict at 4:35 p.m., having deliberated for just thirty-five minutes. Each juror avoided making eye contact with Cummins as they filed back into the courtroom. When asked by the court clerk as to their verdict, the foreman replied, "Guilty of murder." Cummins displayed no emotion as the verdict was read aloud, although his wife burst into tears. He was then asked whether he had any legal reason or cause as to why the court should not impose the penalty of death. In response, Cummins nervously replied, "I am completely innocent, sir."

Cummins was then formally sentenced to death by hanging. Upon imposing this sentence, Mr Justice Asquith stated: "Gordon Frederick Cummins, after a fair trial you have been found guilty, and on a charge of murder. As you know, there is only one sentence which the law permits me to pronounce, and that is you be taken from this place to a lawful prison, and thence to a place of execution, and that you there be hanged by the neck until you are dead. And may the Lord have mercy on your soul."

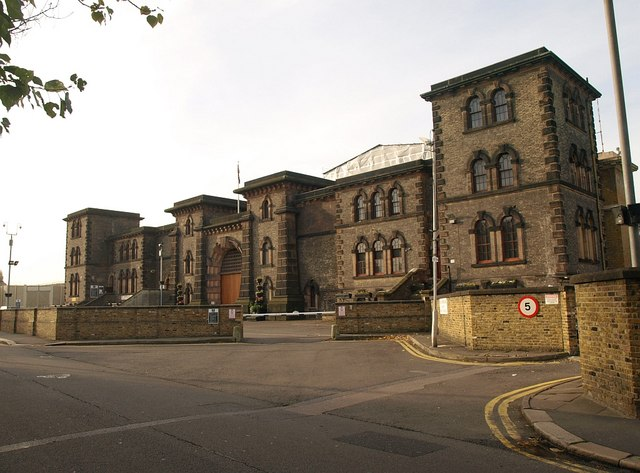
Wandsworth Prison. Cummins was executed within the grounds of this prison on 25 June 1942.

=== Execution ===
Following his conviction, Cummins was held in a condemned cell at HMP Wandsworth to await execution. He voiced no concern over his predicament, and spent much of his time reading whatever materials were available to him. Although he did lodge an appeal against his conviction in which he contended the fingerprint evidence presented against him was flawed, his appeal was rejected by the Lord Chief Justice in early June 1942. Cummins protested his innocence to the end. His wife and family were unwavering in their belief of his innocence and visited him on a frequent basis until his death.

Gordon Cummins was executed by Albert Pierrepoint at HMP Wandsworth at 8 a.m. on 25 June 1942. Contemporary news reports indicate Cummins was given a glass of brandy to calm his nerves. He then walked stoically to the scaffold, flanked by two warders, without offering any resistance. The entire execution process lasted less than two minutes. As per custom, his body was left to hang for one hour prior to the noose being untied from his neck. His body was later buried within the confines of the prison.

Cummins's execution was conducted shortly before a German air raid upon London; his body was removed from the noose and placed upon a stretcher as air raid sirens warned of an impending strike upon the city. He is the only convicted murderer in British criminal history known to have been executed during an air raid.

Charges relating to the other three Blackout Killer murders remained on file. Scotland Yard investigators later stated they strongly believed Cummins had murdered all four women, in addition to the two women murdered in October 1941 while he had been stationed in Colerne prior to his November 1941 posting to Cornwall.

== Media ==
=== Literature ===
- Granger, Ray (1994). "The Wartime Ripper". Real-Life Crimes (72). London, England: Eaglemoss Publications Ltd.: 1588–1592. ISBN 978-1-858-75022-4.
- Honeycombe, Gordon (1983). The Murders of The Black Museum: 1870-1970. New York: Hutchinson Publishing. pp. 371–377. ISBN 978-0-863-79040-9.
- Jessel, David; Wilson, Colin (1991). "The Blackout Killers: Gordon Cummins, August Sangret, Karl Hulten". Murder Casebook: Investigations into the Ultimate Crime. No. 72. London: Marshall Cavendish. ISBN 978-0-748-51448-9.
- Read, Simon (2006). In the Dark: The True Story of the Blackout Ripper. New York: Berkley Publishing Group. ISBN 978-0-425-21283-7.
- Read, Simon (2008). The Blackout Murders: The Shocking True Story. London: JR Books. ISBN 978-1-906-21730-3.
- Storey, Neil R. (2023). The Blackout Murders: Homicide in WW2. Barnsley: Pen & Sword Books. ASIN B0BTJXB91N.

=== Television ===
- The Crime & Investigation Network have broadcast an episode focusing on the Blackout Murders as part of their Murder Casebook series. Presented by Fred Dinenage, this 45-minute episode was first broadcast in November 2012 and features interviews with criminologist David Wilson.

=== Podcast ===
- "The Blackout Killers" (2022). Case 218 of Casefile True Crime Podcast series.

== See also ==
- Capital punishment in the United Kingdom
- HM Prison Wandsworth
- List of executioners
- List of serial killers by number of victims
- List of serial killers in the United Kingdom
- Paul Ogorzow – contemporaneous German serial killer active in Nazi-era Berlin
- Sexual sadism – Paraphilia in which a subject derives gratification from inflicting pain

== Cited works and further reading ==
- Aston, Mark (2005). Foul Deeds and Suspicious Deaths in Hampstead, Holburn and St Pancras. Barnsley: Wharncliffe Books. ISBN 978-1-903-42594-7.
- Bell, Amy (2014). Murder Capital: Suspicious deaths in London, 1933–53. Manchester: Manchester University Press. ISBN 978-0-719-09197-1.
- Bell, Amy (2024). Under Cover of Darkness: Murders in Blackout London. Connecticut: Yale University Press. ISBN 978-0-300-27005-1.
- Blundell, Nigel (2014). The Encyclopedia of Serial Killers. London: Promotional Reprint Company Ltd. ISBN 1-856-48328-2.
- Booth, Charlotte; Billington, Brian (2024). The True Crime Lover's Guide to London. Barnsley: Pen & Sword Books. ISBN 978-1-399-03127-1.
- Cherrill, Frederick (1954). Fingerprints Never Lie: The Autobiography of Fred Cherrill. London: Macmillan. ASIN B0007E08R4.
- Evans, Colin (1996). The Casebook of Forensic Detection: How Science Solved 100 of the World's Most Baffling Crimes. New York City: John Wiley & Sons Inc. ISBN 978-0-471-07650-6.
- Fido, Martin (1995). Twentieth-Century Murder: A Year-By-Year Account of the World's Most Pitiless Crimes. London: Bracken Books. ISBN 978-1-858-91390-2.
- Gaute, J. H. H. (1991). The New Murderers' Who's Who. New York: Dorset Press. ISBN 978-0-747-23270-4.
- Gordon, Michael (2002). The Thames Torso Murders of Victorian London. North Carolina: McFarland & Company, Inc. ISBN 978-0-786-41348-5.
- Gordon, Michael (2018). Murder Files from Scotland Yard and the Black Museum. North Carolina: Exposit Books. ISBN 978-1-476-67254-0.
- Greeno, Edward (1960). War on the underworld. London: John Long Ltd. ASIN B0000CKQQV.
- Howe, Sir Ronald (1961). The Pursuit of Crime. London: A. Barker Publishing. ASIN B000L9Q8UG.
- Hutton, Michael (2012). The Story of Soho: The Windmill Years 1932-1964. Gloucestershire: Amberley Publishings. ISBN 978-1-445-60684-2.
- Jackson, Robert (1963). Coroner, the Biography of Sir Bentley Purchase. London: George G. Harrap and Co. ASIN B0000CLUO8.
- Kaufmann, J. E.; Kaufmann, H. W. (2009). The American GI in Europe in World War II: The March to D-Day. Pennsylvania: Stackpole Books. ISBN 978-0-811-70449-6.
- Lane, Brian (1995). Chronicle of 20th Century Murders. Bournemouth: Select Editions. ISBN 978-0-425-14649-1.
- Lane, Brian; Gregg, Wilfred (1992). The Encyclopedia of Serial Killers. London: Headline Publishing Group. ISBN 978-0-747-23731-0.
- Legg, Penny (2015). Crime in the Second World War: Spivs, Scoundrels, Rogues and Worse. Sevenoaks: Sabrestorm Publishing. ISBN 978-1-781-22009-2.
- Lucas, Norman (1974). The Sex Killers. London: W. H. Allen & Co. ISBN 978-0-491-01481-6.
- McKnight, Gerald (1967). The Murder Squad. London: W. H. Allen & Co. ISBN 978-0-491-00130-4.
- Morris, Jim (2015). The Who's Who of British Crime: In the Twentieth Century. Stroud: Amberley Publishing. ISBN 978-1-445-63924-6.
- Pembroke, Penny (2025). Operation Blackout Ripper: Timeline Truth Be Told. London: Analyst Magazine Inc. ISBN 979-8-900-30009-2.
- Read, Simon (2019). Dark City: Murder, Vice, and Mayhem in Wartime London. Cheltenham: The History Press. ISBN 978-0-750-98985-5.
- Shew, Edward (1961). A Companion to Murder: A Dictionary of Death by Poison, Death by Shooting, Death by Suffocation and Drowning, Death by the Stranglers Hand, 1900-1950. New York: The Knopf Doubleday Publishing Group. ASIN B0000CKPV5.
- Thomas, Donald (2004). The Enemy Within: Hucksters, Racketeers, Deserters, and Civilians During the Second World War. New York: New York University Press. ISBN 978-0-814-78286-6.
- Trow, Meirion James (2008). War Crimes: Underworld Britain in the Second World War. Barnsley: Pen & Sword Books. ISBN 978-1-844-15278-0.
- Tullett, Tom (1979). Strictly Murder: Famous Cases of Scotland Yard's Murder Squad. London: The Bodley Head. ISBN 978-0-370-30097-9.
- Wilson, Colin (1993). Murder in the 1940s. New York City: Caroll & Graf. ISBN 978-0-881-84962-2.
- Wilson, Colin; Wilson, Damon; Wilson, Rowan (1993). World Famous Murders. London: Parragon. ISBN 978-0-752-50122-2.
- Wynn, Stephen (2022). The Blackout Ripper. Philadelphia: Pen & Sword. ISBN 978-1-526-71180-9.
