= Syd Dernley =

English executioner (1920–1994)

- Born: 29 December 1920
- Died: 1 November 1994 (aged 73)
- Occupations: Assistant Executioner, wielder
- Employer: His Majesty's Prison Service/Her Majesty's Prison Service

Syd Dernley (29 December 1920 – 1 November 1994) was appointed assistant executioner by the Home Office in 1949, and participated in 20 hangings until he was replaced in 1954.

In 1950, he assisted Albert Pierrepoint in the hanging of the innocent Timothy Evans for the murder of his family, although John Christie (who was himself executed by Pierrepoint in 1953) committed the murders. On 8 May 1951, Pierrepoint and Dernley escorted convicted murderer James Inglis to the gallows immediately adjacent, and hanged him without delay — the fastest hanging on record, taking only seven seconds from the time his cell door was opened until his fatal 'long drop'.

On 27 April 1954, Dernley was removed from the Home Office Official List of Assistant Executioners. Dernley claimed that no reason was given for his removal, but he suspected it was because of a crude comment he had made about the size of the private parts of an executed man, John Kenneth Livesey, after he had been executed at Wandsworth prison in London on 17 December 1952. Pierrepoint had alluded to such an incident (without mentioning Dernley by name) in his own autobiography. However, the real reason for Dernley's removal from the list was undoubtedly because in 1954 he had been convicted at the Nottinghamshire Quarter Sessions of publishing obscene material. The court sentenced Dernley to six months of imprisonment plus a fine of £50, with costs of £25 awarded against him. Dernley's criminal conviction and subsequent imprisonment constituted firm grounds on which to dismiss him.

A welder in civilian life, Dernley was dubbed, albeit incorrectly, as also Albert Pierrepoint, "the last British hangman" (in fact, this title belongs jointly to Harry Allen and Robert Leslie Stewart). More accurately, Dernley was one of the last surviving hangmen, following the deaths of both Pierrepoint and Allen in 1992.
