= Albert Pierrepoint =

English executioner (1905–1992)

- Born: 30 March 1905; Clayton, West Riding of Yorkshire, England
- Died: 10 July 1992 (aged 87); Southport, Merseyside, England
- Occupations: Executioner, publican
- Employer: His/Her Majesty's Prison Service
- Spouse: Annie Fletcher (m. 1943)
- Father: Henry Pierrepoint
- Relatives: Thomas Pierrepoint (uncle)

Albert Pierrepoint (/ˈpɪərpɔɪnt/ PEER-poynt; 30 March 1905 – 10 July 1992) was an English hangman who executed between 435 and 600 people in a 25-year career that ended in 1956. His father Henry and uncle Thomas were official hangmen before him.

Pierrepoint was born in Clayton in the West Riding of Yorkshire. His family struggled financially because of his father's intermittent employment and heavy drinking. Pierrepoint knew from an early age that he wanted to become a hangman, and was taken on as an assistant executioner in September 1932, aged 27. His first execution was in December that year, alongside his uncle Tom. In October 1941 he undertook his first hanging as lead executioner.

During his tenure he hanged 200 people who had been convicted of war crimes in Germany and Austria, as well as several high-profile murderers—including Gordon Cummins (the Blackout Ripper), John Haigh (the Acid Bath Murderer) and John Christie (the Rillington Place Strangler). He undertook several contentious executions, including Timothy Evans, Derek Bentley and Ruth Ellis and executions for high treason—William Joyce (also known as Lord Haw-Haw) and John Amery—and treachery, with the hanging of Theodore Schurch.

In 1956 Pierrepoint was involved in a dispute with a sheriff over payment, leading to his retirement from the role of hangman. He ran a pub in Lancashire from the mid-1940s until the 1960s. He wrote his memoirs in 1974 in which he concluded that capital punishment was not a deterrent, although he may have changed his position subsequently. He approached his task with gravitas and said that the execution was "sacred to me". His life has been included in several works of fiction, such as the 2005 film Pierrepoint, in which he was portrayed by Timothy Spall.

== Biography ==
=== Early life ===
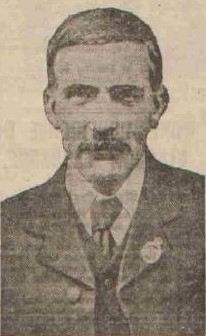
Albert's father Henry

Albert Pierrepoint was born on 30 March 1905 in Clayton in the West Riding of Yorkshire. He was the third of five children and eldest son of Henry Pierrepoint and his wife Mary (née Buxton). Henry had a series of jobs, including a butcher's apprentice, clog maker and a carrier in a local mill, but employment was mostly short-term. With intermittent employment, the family often had financial problems, worsened by Henry's heavy drinking. From 1901 Henry had been on the list of official executioners. The role was part-time, with payment made only for individual hangings, rather than an annual stipend or salary, and there was no pension included with the position.

Henry was removed from the list of executioners in July 1910 after arriving drunk at a prison the day before an execution and excessively berating his assistant. Henry's brother Thomas became an official executioner in 1906. Pierrepoint did not find out about his father's former job until 1916, when Henry's memoirs were published in a newspaper. Influenced by his father and uncle, when asked at school to write about what job he would like when older, Pierrepoint said that "When I leave school I should like to be public executioner like my dad is, because it needs a steady man with good hands like my dad and my Uncle Tom and I shall be the same". (Note: The Pierrepoints were not the first family of official executioners. There were several before them, including James Billington and his three sons, Thomas, William and John; Gregory Brandon and his son, Richard; and the Otway family. Shakespeare refers to "hereditary hangmen" in Coriolanus.)

In 1917 the Pierrepoint family left Huddersfield, West Riding of Yorkshire, and moved to Failsworth, near Oldham, Lancashire. Henry's health declined and he was unable to undertake physical work; as a result, Pierrepoint left school and began work at the local Marlborough Mills. Henry died in 1922 and Pierrepoint received two blue exercise books—in which his father had written his story as a hangman—and Henry's execution diary, which listed details of each hanging in which he had participated. In the 1920s Pierrepoint left the mill and became a drayman for a wholesale grocer, delivering goods ordered through a travelling salesman. By 1930 he had learned to drive a car and a lorry to make his deliveries; he later became manager of the business.

=== As assistant executioner, 1931–1940 ===
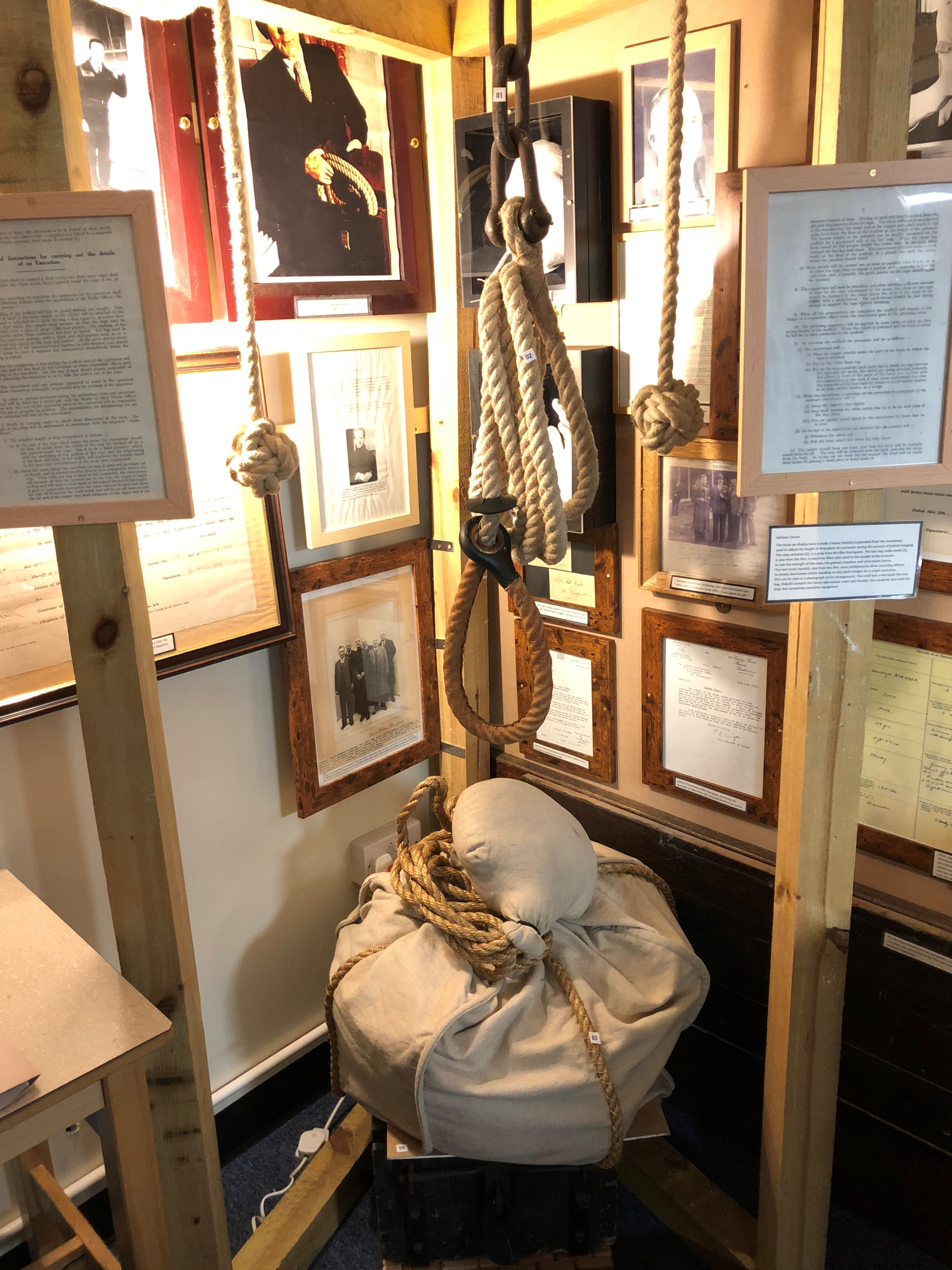
Facsimile of British hangman's equipment, shown at Wandsworth Prison museum

On 19 April 1931 Pierrepoint wrote to the Prison Commissioners and applied to be an assistant executioner. He was turned down; there were no vacancies. He received an invitation for an interview six months later. He was accepted and spent four days training at Pentonville Prison, London, where a dummy was used for practice. He received his formal acceptance letter as an assistant executioner at the end of September 1932. At that time, the assistant's fee was £1 11s 6d per execution (equivalent to £119 in 2025, when adjusted for inflation). Another £1 11s 6d was paid two weeks later if his conduct and behaviour were satisfactory. The executioner was chosen by the county high sheriff—or more commonly delegated to the undersheriff, who selected both the hangman and the assistant. Executioners and their assistants were required to be discreet and the rules for those roles included the clause:

He should clearly understand that his conduct and general behaviour should be respectable, not only at the place and time of the execution, but before and subsequently, that he should avoid attracting public attention in going to or from the prison, and he is prohibited from giving to any person particulars on the subject of his duty for publication.

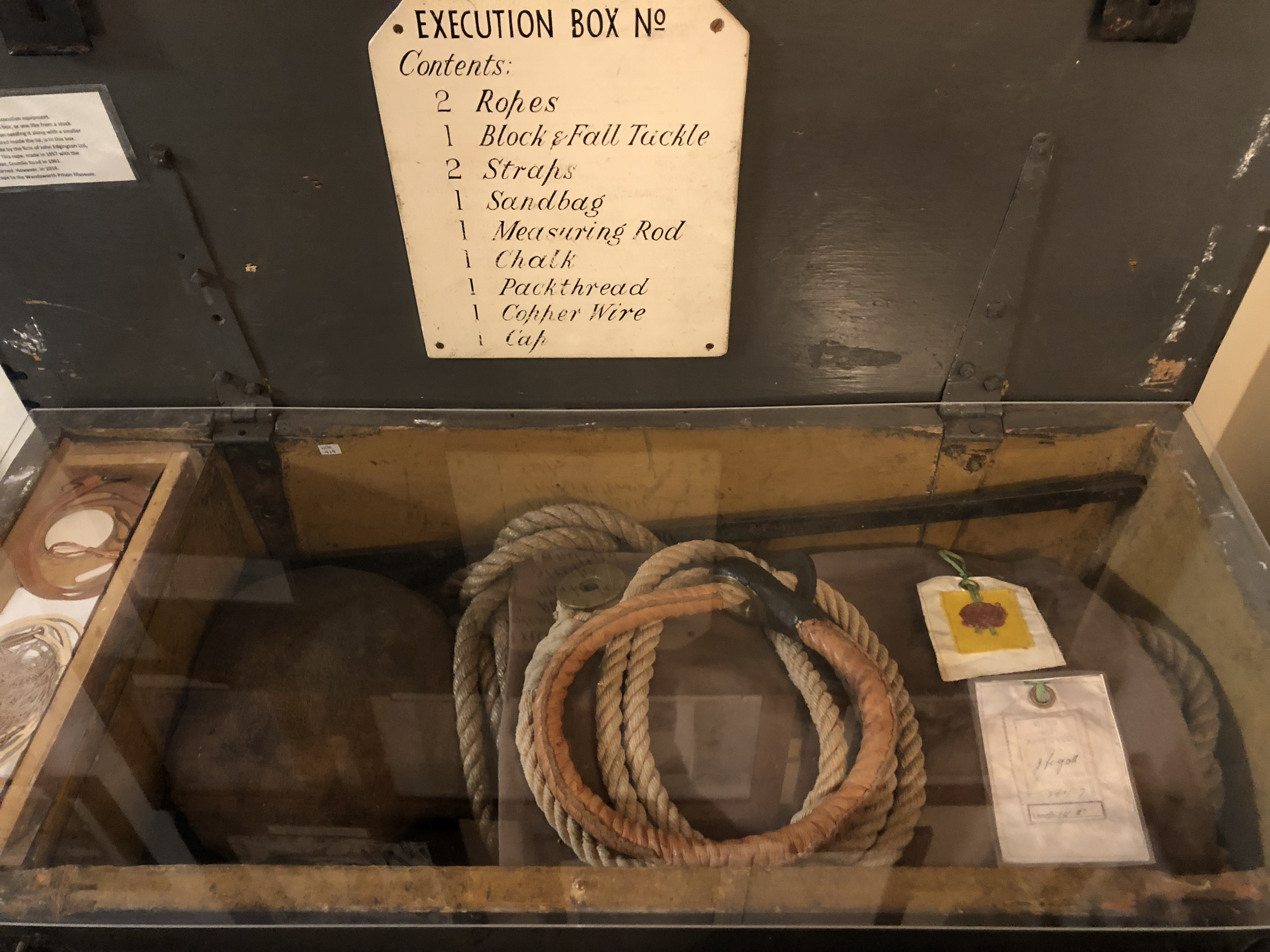
Execution Box number eight, containing all the equipment needed for an executioner; shown at Wandsworth Prison museum

In late December 1932 Pierrepoint undertook his first execution. His uncle Tom had been contracted by the government of the Irish Free State for the hanging of Patrick McDermott, a young Irish farmer who had murdered his brother; Tom was free to select his own assistant as it was outside Britain, and took Pierrepoint with him. They travelled to the Mountjoy Prison, Dublin for the hanging. It was scheduled for 8:00 am, and took less than a minute to perform. Pierrepoint's job as assistant was to follow the prisoner onto the scaffold, bind the prisoner's legs together, then step back off the trapdoor before the lead executioner sprang the mechanism.

For the remainder of the 1930s Pierrepoint worked in the grocery business and as an assistant executioner. Most of his commissions were with his uncle Tom, from whom Pierrepoint learned much. He was particularly impressed with his uncle's approach and demeanour, which were dignified and discreet; he also followed Tom's advice "if you can't do it without whisky, don't do it at all."

In July 1940 Pierrepoint was the assistant at the execution of Udham Singh, an Indian revolutionary who had been convicted of shooting the colonial administrator Sir Michael O'Dwyer. (Note: Singh had been incensed by the 1919 Amritsar massacre, for which he blamed O'Dwyer, the Lieutenant Governor of the Punjab at the time. He offered little defence at his trial and stated "I just shot to make protest. I have seen people starving in India under British Imperialism. I done it ... I am not sorry ... it was my duty.") The day before the execution, Stanley Cross, the newly promoted lead executioner, became confused with his calculations of the drop length, and Pierrepoint stepped in to advise on the correct measurements; Pierrepoint was added to the list of head executioners soon after.

=== As lead executioner, 1940–1956 ===
In October 1941 Pierrepoint undertook his first execution as lead executioner when he hanged the gangland killer Antonio "Babe" Mancini. He followed the routine as established by Home Office guidelines, and as followed by his predecessors. He and his assistant arrived the day before the execution, where he was told the height and weight of the prisoner; he viewed the condemned through the "Judas hole" in the door to judge their build. Pierrepoint then went to the execution room—normally next to the condemned cell—where he tested the equipment using a sack that weighed about the same as the prisoner; he calculated the length of the drop using the Home Office Table of Drops, making allowances for the person's physique, if necessary. (Note: If the drop was too short, the condemned was liable to be strangled to death; too long and there was a risk of decapitation. If the drop was calculated correctly, the prisoner's neck should be broken, resulting in a quick death.) He left the weighted sack hanging on the rope to ensure the rope was stretched and it would be re-adjusted in the morning if necessary.

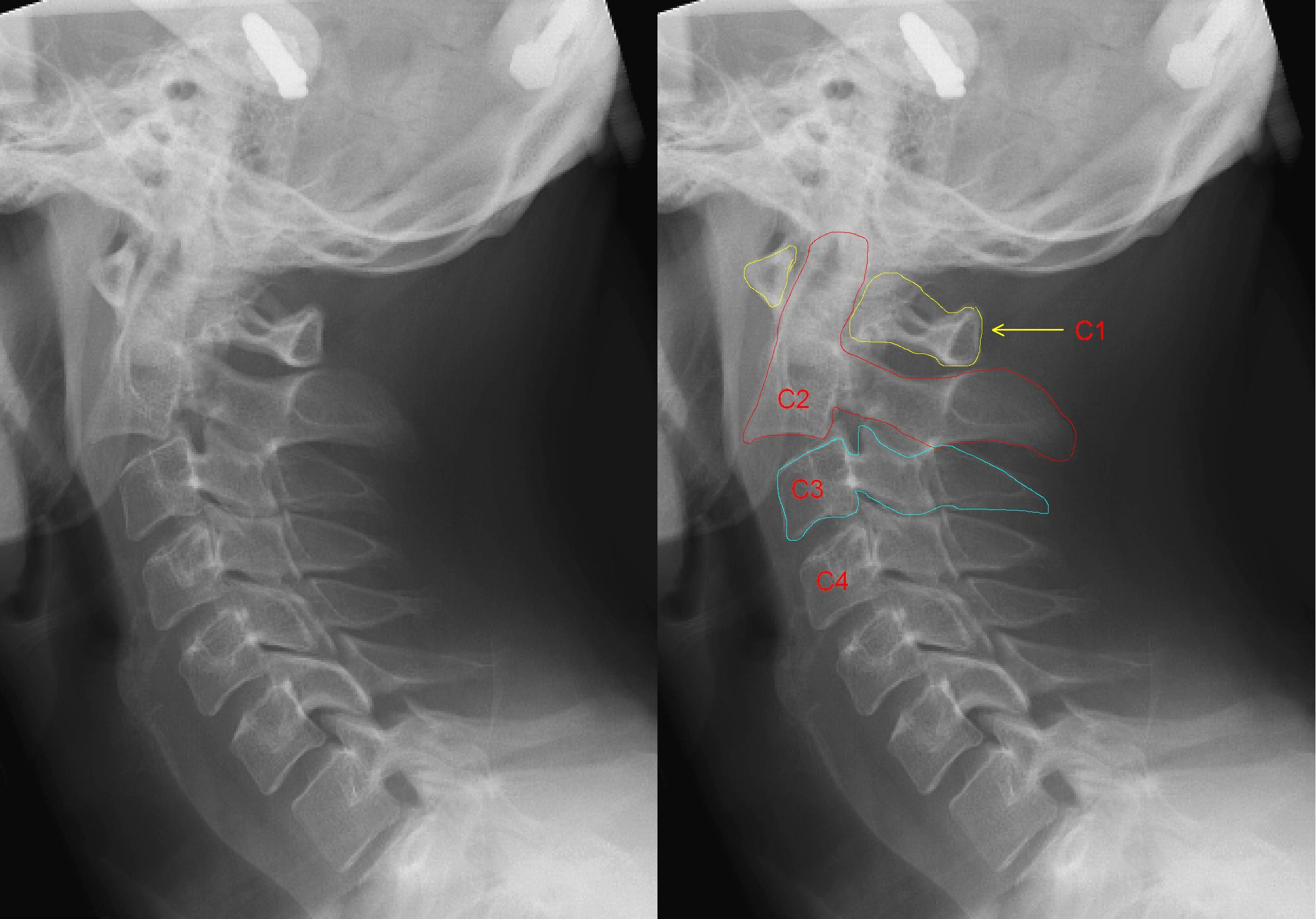
X-ray of the cervical spine with a hangman's fracture. Left without annotation, right with. The C2 (red outline) is moved forward with respect to C3 (blue outline).

On the day of the execution, the practice was for Pierrepoint, his assistant and two prison officers to enter the condemned person's cell at 8:00 am. Pierrepoint secured the person's arms behind his back with a leather strap, and all five walked through a second door, which led to the execution chamber. The prisoner was walked to a marked spot on the trapdoor, whereupon Pierrepoint placed a white hood over the prisoner's head and a noose around their neck. The metal eye through which the rope was looped was placed under the left jawbone which, when the prisoner dropped, forced the head back and broke the spine. Pierrepoint pushed a large lever, releasing the trapdoor. From entering the condemned person's cell to opening the trapdoor took him a maximum of 12 seconds. The neck was broken in almost exactly the same position in each hanging—the hangman's fracture.

==== War-related executions ====
During the Second World War Pierrepoint hanged 15 German spies, as well as US servicemen found guilty by courts martial of committing capital crimes in England. In December 1941 he executed the German spy Karel Richter at Wandsworth Prison. When Pierrepoint entered the condemned man's cell for the hanging, Richter stood up, threw aside one of the guards and charged headfirst at the stone wall. Stunned momentarily, he rose and shook his head. After Richter struggled with the guards, Pierrepoint managed to get the leather strap around Richter's wrists. He burst the leather strap from eye-hole to eye-hole and was free again. After another struggle, the strap was wrapped tightly around his wrists. He was brought to the scaffold where a strap was wrapped around his ankles, followed by a cap and noose. Just as Pierrepoint pushed the lever, Richter jumped up with bound feet. As Richter plummeted through the trapdoor, Pierrepoint could see that the noose had slipped, but it became stuck under Richter's nose. Despite the unusual position of the noose, the prison medical officer determined that it was an instantaneous, clean death. Writing about the execution in his memoirs, Pierrepoint called it "my toughest session on the scaffold during all my career as an executioner". The broken strap was given to Pierrepoint as a souvenir; he used it occasionally for what he thought were meaningful executions.

In August 1943 Pierrepoint married Anne Fletcher after a courtship of five years. He did not tell her about his role as executioner until a few weeks after the nuptials, when he was flown to Gibraltar to hang two saboteurs; on his return he explained the reason for his absence, and she accepted it, saying that she had known about his second job all along, after hearing gossip locally.

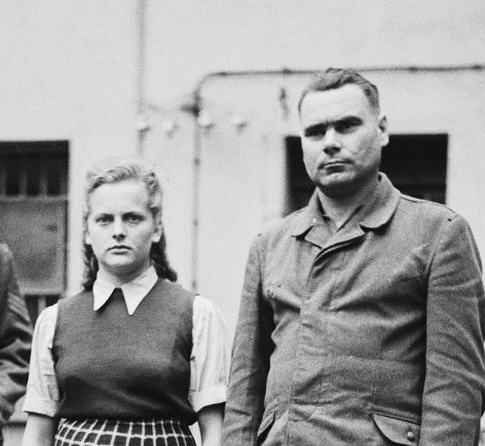
Irma Grese and Josef Kramer, both officials at Bergen-Belsen concentration camp, awaiting trial; both were executed by Pierrepoint.

In late 1945, following the liberation of the Bergen-Belsen concentration camp and the subsequent trial of the camp's officials and functionaries, Pierrepoint was sent to Hamelin, Germany, to carry out the executions of eleven of those sentenced to death, plus two other German war criminals convicted of murdering an RAF pilot in the Netherlands in March 1945. He disliked any publicity connected to his role and was unhappy that his name had been announced to the press by Field Marshal Sir Bernard Montgomery. When he flew to Germany, he was followed across the airfield by the press, which he described as being "as unwelcome as a lynch mob". He was given the honorary military rank of lieutenant colonel and, on 13 December, he first executed the women individually, then the men two at a time. (Note: Pierrepoint subsequently received an anonymous letter every Christmas for several years with a £5 note and the word "Belsen".) Pierrepoint travelled several times to Hamelin, and between December 1948 and October 1949 he executed 226 people, often over 10 a day, and on several occasions groups of up to 17 over 2 days.

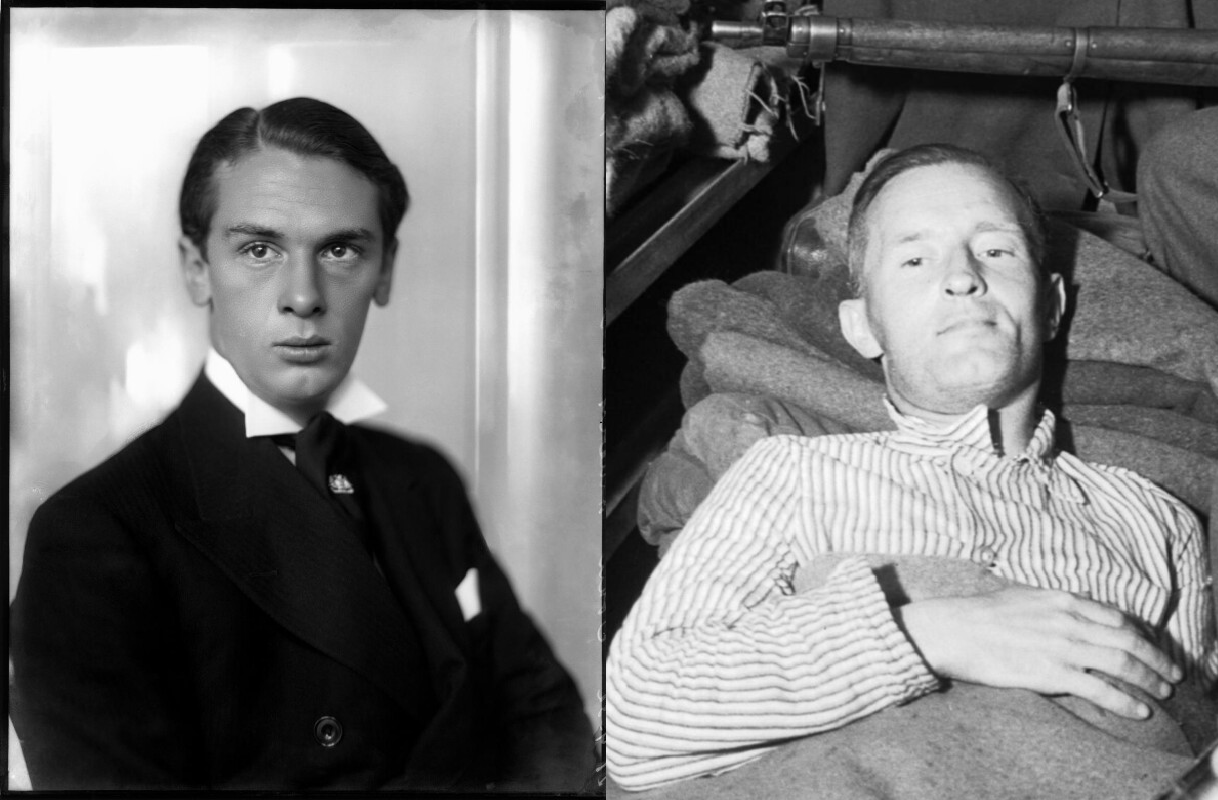
Two of those convicted of treason and hanged by Pierrepoint, John Amery (left) and William Joyce (right)

Six days after the Belsen hangings in December 1945, Pierrepoint hanged John Amery at Wandsworth Prison. Amery, the eldest son of the cabinet minister Leo Amery, was a Nazi sympathiser who had visited prisoner-of-war camps in Germany to recruit allied prisoners for the British Free Corps; (Note: Thirty men joined the organisation as a result of Amery's visits.) he had also broadcast to Britain to encourage men to join the Nazis. He pleaded guilty to treason. On 3 January 1946 Pierrepoint hanged William Joyce, also known as Lord Haw-Haw, who had been given the death sentence for high treason, although it was established that Joyce was born an American citizen, and therefore it was questionable if he was subject to the charge. The following day Pierrepoint hanged Theodore Schurch, a British soldier who had been found guilty under the Treachery Act 1940. Joyce was the last person to be executed in Britain for treason; the death penalty for treason was abolished with the introduction of the Crime and Disorder Act 1998. Schurch was the last person to be hanged in Britain for treachery, and the last to be hanged for any offence other than murder.

In September 1946, Pierrepoint travelled to Graz, Austria, to train staff at Karlau Prison in the British form of long-drop hanging. Previously, the Austrians had used a shorter drop, leaving the executed men to choke to death, rather than the faster long-drop kill. He undertook four double executions of prisoners, with his trainees acting as assistants. Despite Pierrepoint's expertise as an executioner and his experience with hanging the German war criminals at Hamelin, he was not selected as the hangman to carry out the sentences handed down at the Nuremberg trials; the job went to an American, Master Sergeant John C. Woods, who was relatively inexperienced. The press was invited to observe the process, and pictures were later circulated which suggested the hangings had been poorly done. Wilhelm Keitel took 20 minutes to die after the trapdoor opened; the trap was not wide enough, so some of the men hit the edges as they fell—more than one person's nose was torn off in the process—and others were strangled, rather than having their necks broken.

==== Post-war executions ====
Albert Pierrepoint's notebook, where he listed the personal details of the people he executed, including Lord Haw-Haw, and the drop length (in feet and inches) each received during their hanging

After the war Pierrepoint left the delivery business and took over the lease of a pub, the Help the Poor Struggler on Manchester Road, in the Hollinwood area of Oldham. In the 1950s he left the pub and took a lease of the larger Rose and Crown at Much Hoole near Preston, Lancashire. He later said that he changed his main occupation because:

I wanted to run my own business so that I should be under no obligation when I took time off. ... I could take a three o'clock plane from Dublin after conducting an execution there and be opening my bar without comment at half past five.

Sir Ernest Gowers in 1920; Gowers was the chairman of the Royal Commission on Capital Punishment

In 1948 Parliament debated a new Criminal Justice Bill, which raised the question of whether to continue with the death penalty or not. While the debates were proceeding, no executions took place, and Pierrepoint worked solely in his pub. When the bill failed in the House of Lords, hangings resumed after a nine-month gap. The following year, the Home Secretary, Chuter Ede, set up a Royal Commission to look into capital punishment in the UK. Pierrepoint gave evidence in November 1950 and included a mock hanging at Wandsworth Prison for the commission members. The commission's report was published in 1953 and resulted in the Homicide Act 1957 which reduced the grounds for execution by differentiating between capital and non-capital charges for homicide.

From the late 1940s and into the 1950s Pierrepoint, Britain's most experienced executioner, carried out several more hangings, including those of prisoners described by his biographer, Brian Bailey, as "the most notorious murderers of the period ... [and] three of the most controversial executions in the latter years of the death penalty." In August 1949 he hanged John Haigh, nicknamed "the Acid Bath Murderer", as he had dissolved the bodies of his victims in sulphuric acid; Haigh admitted to nine murders, and tried to avoid hanging by saying he drank the blood of his victims and claiming insanity. The following year Pierrepoint hanged James Corbitt, one of the regular customers at Pierrepoint's pub; the two had sung duets together and while Pierrepoint called Corbitt "Tish", Corbitt returned the nickname "Tosh". In his autobiography, Pierrepoint considered the matter:

As I polished the glasses, I thought if any man had a deterrent to murder poised before him, it was this troubadour whom I called Tish, coming to terms with his obsessions in the singing room of Help The Poor Struggler. He was not only aware of the rope, he had the man who handled it beside him, singing a duet. ... The deterrent did not work. He killed the thing he loved.

In March 1950 Pierrepoint hanged Timothy Evans, a 25-year-old man who had the vocabulary of a 14-year-old and the mental age of a ten-year-old. Evans was arrested for the murder of his wife and daughter at their home, the top floor flat of 10 Rillington Place, London. His statements to the police were contradictory, telling them that he killed her, and also that he was innocent. He was tried and convicted for the murder of his daughter. (Note: At the time, capital cases were only carried out for one murder, even if there was evidence for more deaths.) Three years later Evans's landlord, John Christie, was arrested for the murder of several women, whose bodies he hid in the house. He subsequently admitted to the murder of Evans's wife, but not the daughter. Pierrepoint hanged him in July 1953 in Pentonville Prison, but the case showed Evans's conviction and hanging had been a miscarriage of justice. The matter led to further questions on the use of the death penalty in Britain.

In the months before he hanged Christie, Pierrepoint undertook another controversial execution, that of Derek Bentley, a 19-year-old man who had been an accomplice of Christopher Craig, a 16-year-old boy who shot and killed a policeman. Bentley was described in his trial as:

a youth of low intelligence, shown by testing to be just above the level of a feeble-minded person, illiterate, unable to read or write, and when tested in a way which did not involve scholastic knowledge shown to have a mental age between 11 and 12 years.

At the time the policeman was shot, Bentley had been under arrest for 15 minutes, and the words he said to Craig—"Let him have it, Chris"—could either have been taken for an incitement to shoot, or for Craig to hand his gun over (one policeman had asked him to hand the gun over just beforehand). Bentley was found guilty by the English law principle of joint enterprise.

Pierrepoint hanged Ruth Ellis for murder in July 1955. Ellis was in an abusive relationship with David Blakely, a racing driver; she shot him four times after what her biographer, Jane Dunn, called "three days of sleeplessness, panic, and pathological jealousy, fuelled by quantities of Pernod and a reckless consumption of tranquillizers". The case attracted great interest from the press and public. The matter was discussed in Cabinet and a petition of 50,000 signatures was sent to the Home Secretary, Gwilym Lloyd George, to ask for a reprieve; he refused to grant one. Ellis was the last woman to be hanged in Britain. Two weeks after Ellis's execution, Pierrepoint hanged Norman Green, who had confessed to killing two boys in the Wigan area; it was Pierrepoint's last execution.

=== Retirement and later life ===
In early January 1956 Pierrepoint travelled to Manchester for another execution and paid for staff to cover the bar in his absence. He spent the afternoon in the prison calculating the drop and setting up the rope to the right length. That evening the prisoner was given a reprieve. Pierrepoint left the prison and, because of heavy snow, stayed overnight in a local hotel before returning home. Two weeks later he received from the instructing sheriff a cheque for his travelling expenses, but not his execution fee. He wrote to the Prison Commissioners to point out that he had received a full fee in other cases of reprieve, and that he had spent additional money in employing bar staff. The Commissioners advised he speak to the instructing sheriff, as it was his responsibility, not theirs; they also reminded him that his conditions of employment were that he was paid only for the execution, not in the case of a reprieve. Shortly afterwards he received a letter from the sheriff offering £4 as a compromise. On 23 February he replied to the Prison Commissioners and informed them that he was resigning with immediate effect, and requested that his name be taken from the list of executioners.

There were soon rumours in the press that his resignation was connected with the hanging of Ellis. In his autobiography he denied this was the case:

At the execution of Ruth Ellis no untoward incident happened which in any way appalled me or anyone else, and the execution had absolutely no connection with my resignation seven months later. Nor did I leave the list, as one newspaper said, by being arbitrarily taken off it, to shut my mouth, because I was about to reveal the last words of Ruth Ellis. She never spoke.

Pierrepoint's autobiography does not give any reasons for his resignation—he states that the Prison Commissioners asked him to keep the details private. The Home Office contacted the Sheriff of Lancashire, who paid Pierrepoint the full fee of £15 for his services, but he was adamant that he was still retiring. He had received an offer for £30,000 to £40,000 from the Empire News and Sunday Chronicle to publish weekly stories about his experiences. (Note: £30,000 to £40,000 in 1956 equates to approximately £650,000 to £870,000 in 2025, according to calculations based on Consumer Price Index measure of inflation.) The Home Office considered prosecuting him under the Official Secrets Act 1939, but when two of the stories appeared that contained information that contradicted the recollections of other witnesses, they did not do so. Instead pressure was put on the publishers who stopped the stories.

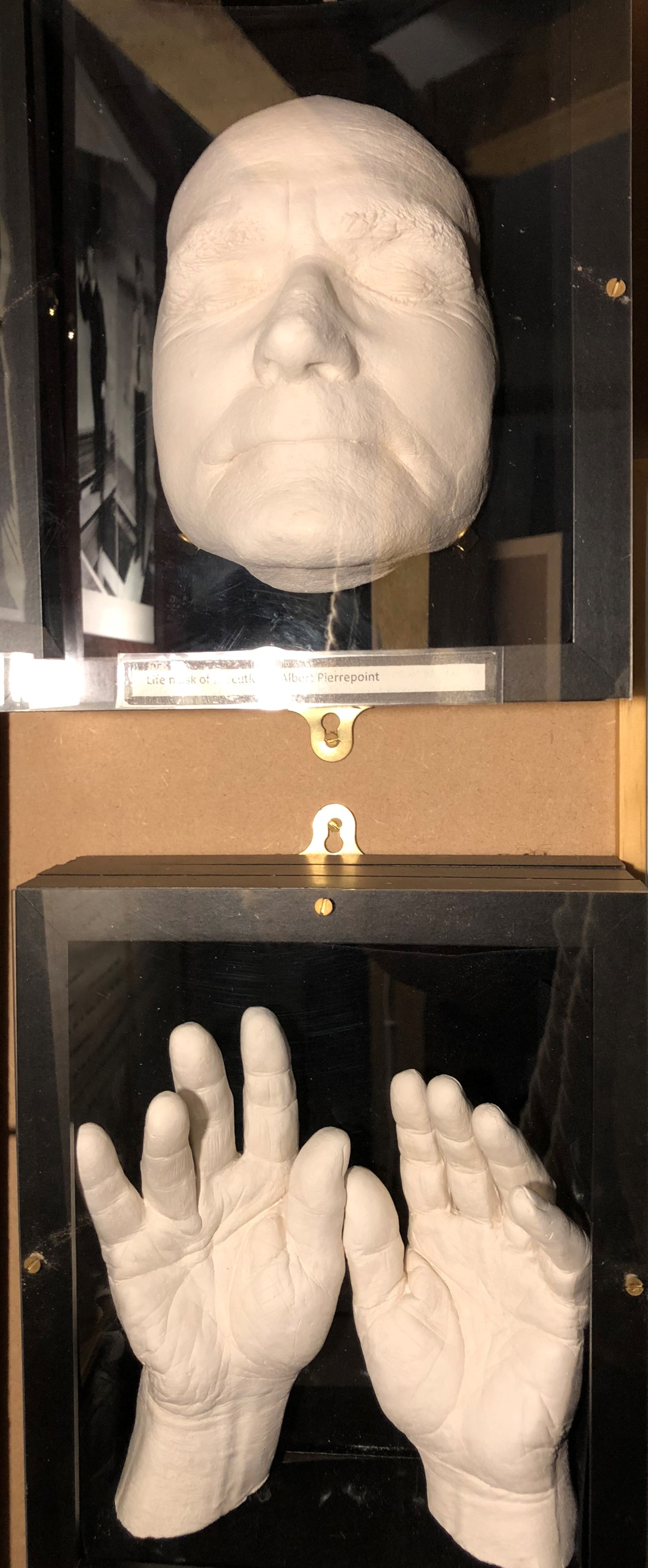
Pierrepoint's life mask and hand casts, at the Wandsworth Prison museum

Pierrepoint and his wife ran their pub until they retired to the seaside town of Southport in the 1960s. In 1974 he published his autobiography, Executioner: Pierrepoint. He died on 10 July 1992, aged 87, in the nursing home where he had lived for the last four years of his life.

== Views on capital punishment ==
In his 1974 autobiography, Pierrepoint changed his view on capital punishment, and wrote that hanging:

... is said to be a deterrent. I cannot agree. There have been murders since the beginning of time, and we shall go on looking for deterrents until the end of time. If death were a deterrent, I might be expected to know. It is I who have faced them last, young lads and girls, working men, grandmothers. I have been amazed to see the courage with which they take that walk into the unknown. It did not deter them then, and it had not deterred them when they committed what they were convicted for. All the men and women whom I have faced at that final moment convince me that in what I have done I have not prevented a single murder.

In a 1976 interview with BBC Radio Merseyside, Pierrepoint expressed his uncertainty towards the sentiments, and said that when the autobiography was originally written, "there was not a lot of crime. Not like there is today. I am now honestly on a balance and I don't know which way to think because it changes every day." Pierrepoint's position as an opponent of capital punishment was questioned by his long-time former assistant, Syd Dernley, in his 1989 autobiography, The Hangman's Tale:

Even the great Pierrepoint developed some strange ideas in the end. I do not think I will ever get over the shock of reading in his autobiography, many years ago, that like the Victorian executioner James Berry before him, he had turned against capital punishment and now believed that none of the executions he had carried out had achieved anything! This from the man who proudly told me that he had done more jobs than any other executioner in English history. I just could not believe it. When you have hanged more than 680 people, it's a hell of a time to find out you do not believe capital punishment achieves anything!

== Approach and legacy ==
Pierrepoint described his approach to hanging in his autobiography. He did so in what Lizzie Seal, a reader in criminology, calls "quasi-religious language", including the phrase that a "higher power" selected him as an executioner. When asked by the Royal Commission about his role, he replied that "It is sacred to me". In his autobiography, Pierrepoint describes his ethos thus:

I have gone on record ... as saying that my job is sacred to me. That sanctity must be most apparent at the hour of death. A condemned prisoner is entrusted to me, after decisions have been made which I cannot alter. He is a man, she is a woman, who, the church says, still merits some mercy. The supreme mercy I can extend to them is to give them and sustain in them their dignity in dying and death. The gentleness must remain.

Brian Bailey highlights Pierrepoint's phrasing relating to hangings; the autobiography reads "I had to hang Derek Bentley", "I had to execute John Christie" and "I had to execute Mrs Louisa Merrifield". Bailey comments that Pierrepoint "never had to hang anybody".

The exact number of people executed by Pierrepoint has never been established. Bailey, in the Oxford Dictionary of National Biography, and Leonora Klein, one of his biographers, state it was over 400; Steven Fielding, another biographer, puts the figure at 435—based on the Prison Execution Books held at The National Archives; the obituarists of The Times and The Guardian put the figure at 17 women and 433 men. The Irish Times puts the figure at 530 people, The Independent considers the figure to be 530 men and 20 women, while the BBC states it is "up to 600" people.

In addition to his 1974 autobiography, Pierrepoint has been the subject of several biographies, either focusing on him or alongside other executioners. These include Pierrepoint: A Family of Executioners by Fielding, published in 2006, and Leonora Klein's 2006 book A Very English Hangman: The Life and Times of Albert Pierrepoint. There have been several television and radio documentaries about or including Pierrepoint, and he has been portrayed on stage and screen, and in literature. (Note: In print: Murder at Wrotham Hill (2012), Diana Souhami's account of the 1946 murder of Dagmar Petrzywalski, includes Pierrepoint, contrasting his role as the executioner of Petrzywalski's murderer with his work hanging Nazi war criminals in the same period.; On film: Pierrepoint is portrayed by Edwin Brown executing Timothy Evans in the 1971 film 10 Rillington Place. Pierrepoint served as an uncredited technical adviser on this film, to ensure the authenticity of the hanging scene.; In the 1991 film Let Him Have It, Pierrepoint is played by Clive Revill, executing Derek Bentley.; Timothy Spall portrayed him in the 2006 film Pierrepoint.; On television: In 2016 John Paul Hurley portrayed Pierrepoint in the BBC production of Rillington Place starring Tim Roth and Samantha Morton.)

On Pierrepoint's resignation, two assistant executioners were promoted to lead executioner: Jock Stewart and Harry Allen. Over the next seven years they carried out the remaining thirty-four executions in the UK. On 13 August 1964 Allen hanged Gwynne Evans at Strangeways Prison in Manchester for the murder of John Alan West; at the same time, Stewart hanged Evans's accomplice, Peter Allen, at Walton Gaol in Liverpool. They were the last hangings in English legal history. The following year the Murder (Abolition of Death Penalty) Act 1965 was passed, which imposed a five-year moratorium on executions. The temporary ban was made permanent on 18 December 1969.

== See also ==
- Locations of executions conducted by Albert Pierrepoint
- List of executioners

== Notes and references ==
=== Sources ===
==== Books ====
- Bailey, Brian (1989). Hangmen of England: History of Execution from Jack Ketch to Albert Pierrepoint. London: Virgin Books. ISBN 978-0-4910-3129-5.
- Barnett, Hilaire (2014). Constitutional & Administrative Law. London: Routledge. ISBN 978-1-317-44622-4.
- Block, Brian P.; Hostettler, John (1997). Hanging in the Balance: A History of the Abolition of Capital Punishment in Britain. Hook, Hampshire: Waterside Press. ISBN 978-1-872870-47-2.
- Dernley, Syd; Newman, David (1990). The Hangman's Tale. London: Pan Books. ISBN 978-0-3303-1633-0.
- Fielding, Steve (2008a). Pierrepoint: A Family of Executioners. London: John Blake Publishing. ISBN 978-1-8445-4611-4.
- Fielding, Steve (2008b). The Executioner's Bible: The Story of Every British Hangman of the Twentieth Century (Kindle ed.). London: John Blake Publishing. ISBN 978-1-8445-4422-6.
- Gowers, Ernest (1953). Royal Commission on Capital Punishment 1949–1953: Report. London: Her Majesty's Stationery Office. OCLC 226990460.
- Hancock, Robert (2000). Ruth Ellis: The Last Woman to Be Hanged. London: Orion. ISBN 978-0-7528-3449-8.
- Hayward, James (2013). Double Agent Snow: The True Story of Arthur Owens, Hitler's Chief Spy in England. London: Simon and Schuster. ISBN 978-0-85720-854-5.
- Head, Michael (2016). Crimes Against the State: From Treason to Terrorism. London: Routledge. ISBN 978-1-317-15793-9.
- Hodgkinson, Peter; Rutherford, Andrew (1996). Capital Punishment: Global Issues and Prospects. Winchester, Hants: Waterside Press. ISBN 978-1-872870-32-8.
- Klein, Leonora (2006). A Very English Hangman: The Life and Times of Albert Pierrepoint. London: Corvo Books. ISBN 978-0-9543255-6-5.
- McLaughlin, Stewart (2004). Execution Suite: A History of the Gallows at Wandsworth Prison 1879–1993. London: HMP Wandsworth. ISBN 978-0-9551-0801-3.
- Marston, Edward (2009). Prison: Five Hundred Years of Life Behind Bars. London: Bloomsbury Academic. ISBN 978-1-905615-33-9.
- Pierrepoint, Albert (1977) [1974]. Executioner: Pierrepoint. London: Coronet. ISBN 978-0-3402-1307-0.
- Rhodes James, Robert (1987). Anthony Eden. London: Macmillan. ISBN 978-0-333-45503-6.
- Twitchell, Neville (2012). The Politics of the Rope: The Campaign to Abolish Capital Punishment in Britain, 1955–1969. Bury St Edmunds, Suffolk: Arena Books. ISBN 978-1-906791-98-8.

==== Journals ====
- "Amery, John (1912–1945)". Oxford Dictionary of National Biography (online ed.). Oxford University Press. 2006. doi:10.1093/ref:odnb/37112. (Subscription, Wikipedia Library access or UK public library membership required.)
- Bailey, Brian (2004). "Pierrepoint, Albert, (1905–1992)". Oxford Dictionary of National Biography (online ed.). Oxford University Press. doi:10.1093/ref:odnb/38768. (Subscription, Wikipedia Library access or UK public library membership required.)
- "Christie, John Reginald Halliday (1899–1953)". Oxford Dictionary of National Biography (online ed.). Oxford University Press. 2013. doi:10.1093/ref:odnb/37280. (Subscription, Wikipedia Library access or UK public library membership required.)
- Dunn, Jane (2008). "Ellis [née Neilson], Ruth (1926–1955)". Oxford Dictionary of National Biography. Vol. 1 (online ed.). Oxford University Press. doi:10.1093/ref:odnb/56716. (Subscription, Wikipedia Library access or UK public library membership required.)
- Madra, Amandeep Singh (2008). "Singh, Udham (1899–1940)". Oxford Dictionary of National Biography (online ed.). Oxford University Press. doi:10.1093/ref:odnb/73200. (Subscription, Wikipedia Library access or UK public library membership required.)
- Morgan, Basil (2017). "Brandon, Richard (d. 1649)". Oxford Dictionary of National Biography (online ed.). Oxford University Press. doi:10.1093/ref:odnb/3266. (Subscription, Wikipedia Library access or UK public library membership required.)
- Nicholas, Siân (2017). "Joyce, William Brooke (known as Lord Haw-Haw) (1906–1946)". Oxford Dictionary of National Biography (online ed.). Oxford University Press. doi:10.1093/ref:odnb/37621. (Subscription, Wikipedia Library access or UK public library membership required.)
- Robin, Gerald D. (September 1964). "The Executioner: His Place in English Society". The British Journal of Sociology. 15 (3): 234–253. doi:10.2307/588468. JSTOR 588468.
- Seal, Lizzie (2016). "Albert Pierrepoint and the Cultural Persona of the Twentieth-Century Hangman" (PDF). Crime, Media, Culture. 12 (1): 83–100. doi:10.1177/1741659015603623. ISSN 1741-6590. S2CID 147231485.

==== News articles ====
- Boseley, Sarah (13 July 1992). "Obituary: Albert Pierrepoint". The Guardian. p. 32.
- Campbell, Denis (13 July 1992). "Capital punishment achieved 'nothing but revenge'". The Irish Times. p. 7.
- Coslett, Paul (19 August 2008). "Albert Pierrepoint". BBC.
- Morrison, Blake (23 November 2012). "Murder at Wrotham Hill by Diana Souhami – Review". The Guardian.
- "Obituary: Albert Pierrepoint". The Daily Telegraph. 13 July 1992. Archived from the original on 21 July 2009.
- "Obituary: Albert Pierrepoint". The Times. 13 July 1992. p. 15.
- Richardson, Robert (13 July 1992). "Obituary: Albert Pierrepoint". The Independent. Archived from the original on 15 October 2010.

==== Websites ====
- "Bentley (Deceased), R v [1998] EWCA Crim 2516 (30 July 1998)". British and Irish Legal Information Institute. 30 July 1998.
- Clark, Gregory (2018). "The Annual RPI and Average Earnings for Britain, 1209 to Present (New Series)". MeasuringWorth.
- "'Let Him Have It' (1991)". British Film Institute. Archived from the original on 10 March 2017.
- "Pierrepoint (2006)". British Film Institute. Archived from the original on 17 July 2016.
- "Rillington Place". BBC.
