= Café Monico =

Coordinates: 51.5118°N 0.1328°W

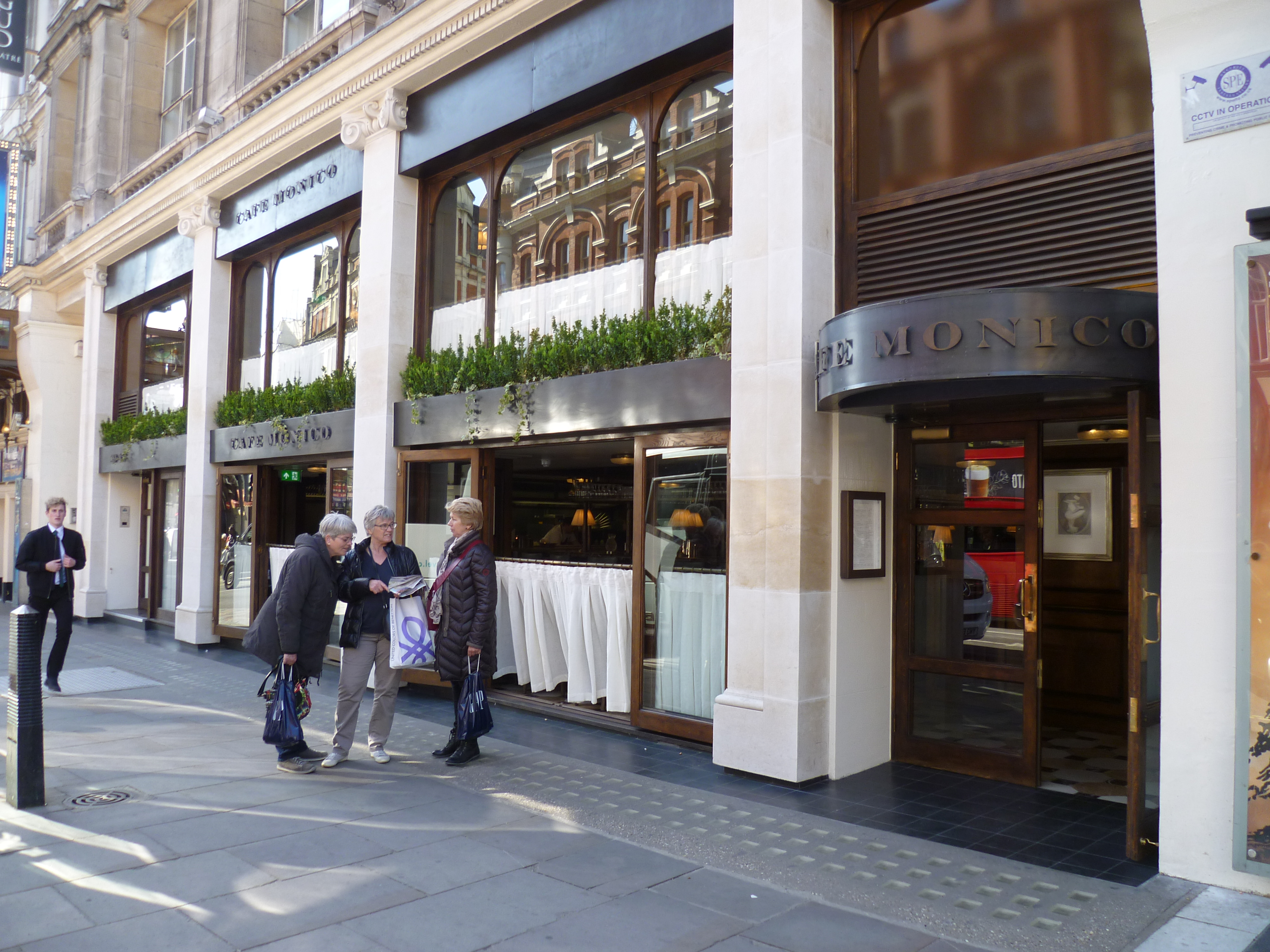
- Interactive map of Café Monico

Restaurant information
- Established: 1877
- Closed: 2021
- Location: Shaftesbury Avenue, London, United Kingdom

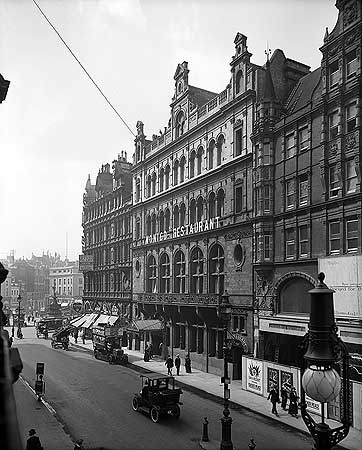
Café Monico in 1915.

Café Monico was a restaurant on London's Shaftesbury Avenue.

It was originally established in 1877 at 15 Tichborne Street in 1877 by the brothers Giacomo and Battista Monico.

The first World Weightlifting Championships, then known as the International Amateur Weight Lifting Championship, was held at the Café Monico in 1891, and the Climbers' Club was formed there in 1897.

The banquet for the London 1899 chess tournament took place there.

After some time as the nightclub Avalon, a refurbished Cafe Monico reopened under the new ownership of Soho House in April 2016. It became a two-floor restaurant serving European dishes under the supervision of consultant chef Rowley Leigh.

The restaurant closed permanently in 2021.

File:London , Kodachrome by Chalmers Butterfield edit.jpg a color photogragh where you can see café monico [then "monico grill"] in the background, 1949.
