= Pierrepoint (film) =

2005 British film by Adrian Shergold

- British theatrical quad
- Directed by: Adrian Shergold
- Written by: Jeff Pope; Bob Mills
- Produced by: Christine Langan
- Starring: Timothy Spall; Juliet Stevenson; Eddie Marsan
- Cinematography: Danny Cohen
- Edited by: Tania Reddin
- Music by: Martin Phipps
- Distributed by: Redbus Film Distribution
- Release dates: 12 September 2005 (Toronto International Film Festival); 7 April 2006 (United Kingdom)
- Running time: 90 minutes
- Country: United Kingdom
- Language: English

Pierrepoint is a 2005 British film directed by Adrian Shergold about the life of British executioner Albert Pierrepoint.

The film premiered at the 2005 Toronto International Film Festival and was released in the UK on 7 April 2006. In the United States, it received a limited theatrical release at three screens on 7 June 2007, grossing $21,766. It was later released on DVD on 30 October 2007.

Commissioned as a television film in 2004, Pierrepoint was broadcast on ITV on 25 August 2008, when it attracted an estimated audience of 3.6 million. The film was renamed Pierrepoint: The Last Hangman for its North American release, although Pierrepoint was not the last British hangman.

== Premise ==
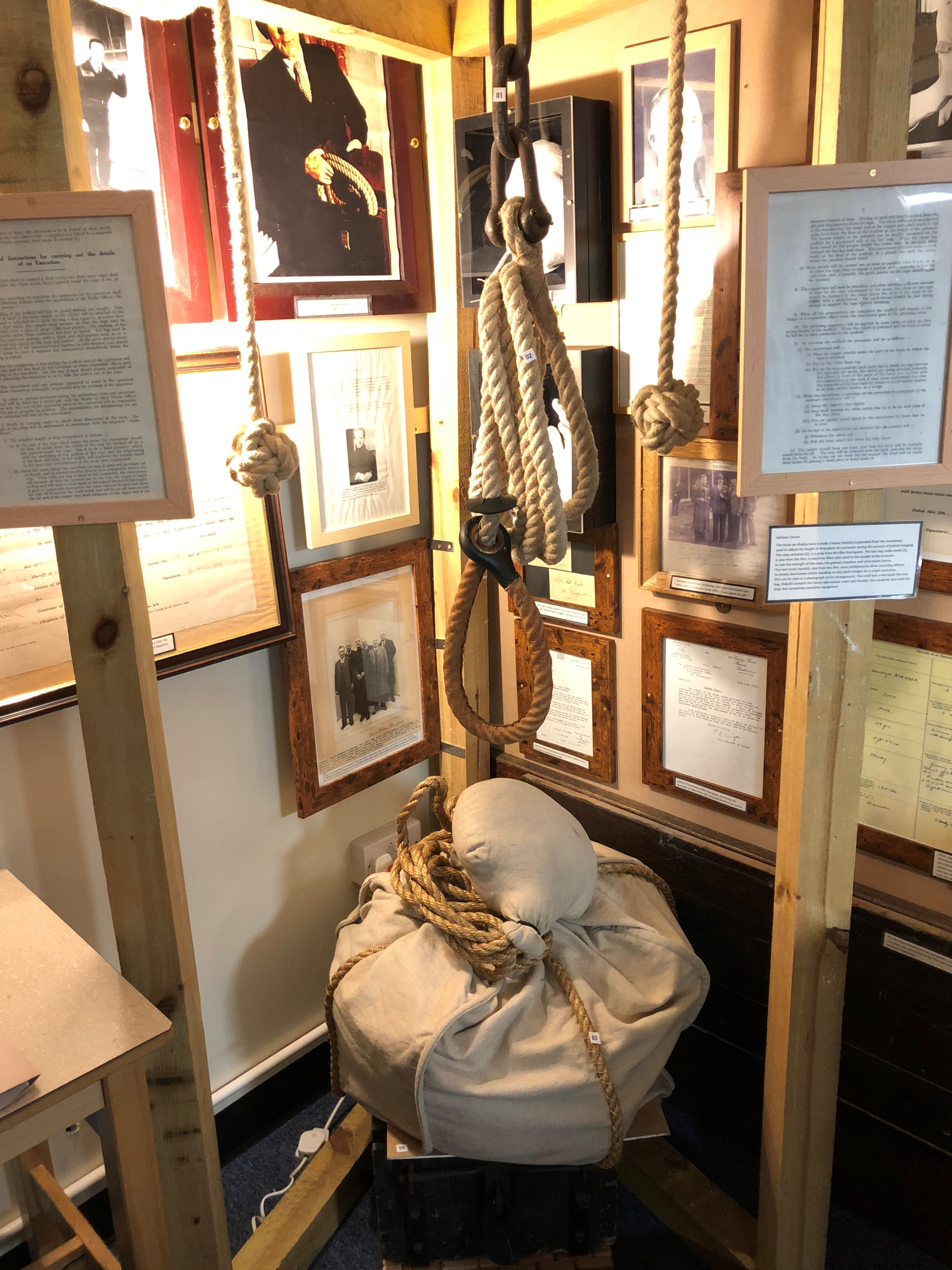
The props used in the film, now on display at Wandsworth Prison museum

The film is loosely based on the life of Britain's most prolific hangman, Albert Pierrepoint (played by Timothy Spall), from the time he is trained for the job and accepted onto the list of the country's official hangmen in 1932 until his resignation in 1956.

The film is a highly fictionalised account of his life and has a strong anti-capital punishment theme. A number of executions occur out of sequence and there are a number of factual errors, such as female prison warders being present at female executions and two newly qualified executioners working together as "Number One" and "Assistant".

== Cast ==
- Timothy Spall as Albert Pierrepoint
- Juliet Stevenson as Annie Pierrepoint
- Eddie Marsan as James "Tish" Corbitt
- Ben McKay as Timothy Evans
- Michael Norton as Josef Kramer
- Lizzie Hopley as Dorothea Waddingham
- Cavan Clerkin as George Cooper
- Mary Jo Randle as Mrs. Corbitt
- Christopher Fulford as Charlie Sykes
- Ian Shaw as Percy
- Ann Bell as Violet Van der Elst
- Robin Soans as Governor Paton-Walsh
- Nicholas Blane as Governor of Strangeways
- Clive Brunt as Warder at Strangeways
- Maggie Ollerenshaw as Mary Pierrepoint, Albert's mother
- Bernard Kay as Uncle Tom
- Claire Keelan as Jessie Kelly
- Clive Francis as Monty
- Sheyla Shehovich as Irma Grese
- Keiran Flynn as Neville
- Tobias Menzies as Lieutenant Llewellyn
- Mary Stockley as Ruth Ellis
- James Corden as Kirky

== Production ==
The hanging scenes and the street protest scenes at the end of the film were at the Historic Dockyard, Chatham.

== Reception ==
On review aggregator website Rotten Tomatoes, the film holds an approval rating of 79% based on 53 reviews, with an average rating of 7/10. The site's critical consensus reads, "Director Adrian Shergold doesn't shy away from the darker elements of the movie's subject, and Timothy Spall is mesmerizing as the title character." On Metacritic, the film has a weighted average score of 68 out of 100, based on 15 critics, indicating "generally favourable reviews".
