= James Corbitt =

British murderer

James Henry "Tish" Corbitt (20 October 1913 – 28 November 1950) was an English murderer hanged at Strangeways Prison in Manchester by Albert Pierrepoint.

== Biography ==
Corbitt was born in Oldham. At the time of the murder of his mistress, Eliza Woods, he was a frequent customer in Pierrepoint’s pub "Help The Poor Struggler" (on Manchester Road, in the Hollinwood area of Oldham), sang with him round the piano and called him "Tosh" while Pierrepoint called him "Tish" (Tish and Tosh were, at that time, common nicknames used between people who were passing acquaintances but who did not know each other's names; they were also the names of two popular fictional comic characters). Corbitt knew about the official sideline of his publican.

At the time of the murder, Corbitt was separated from his wife and his 11-year-old son, and had a mistress, Ms. Woods. In August 1950, he throttled Woods in a hotel room in Ashton-under-Lyne, Lancashire. Her body was found the next morning with the word 'whore' written on her forehead. Corbitt pleaded guilty but insane. At his trial at Liverpool Assizes, the Crown argued the crime was premeditated and cited diary entries detailing Corbitt's plans to kill Woods. He was convicted and sentenced to death by Mr Justice Lynskey.

In his memoirs (Executioner: Pierrepoint), Pierrepoint wrote about his feelings when returning to the pub after Corbitt's execution: "I thought if any man had a deterrent to murder poised before him, it was this troubadour whom I called Tish. He was not only aware of the rope, he had the man who handled it beside him singing a duet. The deterrent did not work."

Pierrepoint goes on to relate Corbitt's final moments:

At twenty seconds to nine the next morning I went into the death cell. He seemed under a great strain, but I did not see stark fear in his eyes, only a more childlike worry. He was anxious to be remembered, and to be accepted. "Hallo, Tosh," he said, not very confidently. "Hallo Tish," I said. "How are you?" I was not effusive, just gave the casual warmth of my nightly greeting from behind the bar.

Pierrepoint goes on to describe how Corbitt smiled and relaxed after this greeting. After strapping Corbitt's arms, Pierrepoint said "Come on Tish, old chap", at which Corbitt went to the gallows "...lightly...I would say that he ran."

The role of Corbitt is played by Eddie Marsan in the 2005 film Pierrepoint, which reproduced the scene.

In 2006, Corbitt's son stated his father "probably deserved the hangman's noose", as he had been contemplating murdering Woods for a year.
