= Graz-Karlau Prison =

Prison in Styria, Austria

Coordinates: 47°03′15.54″N 15°25′46.75″E

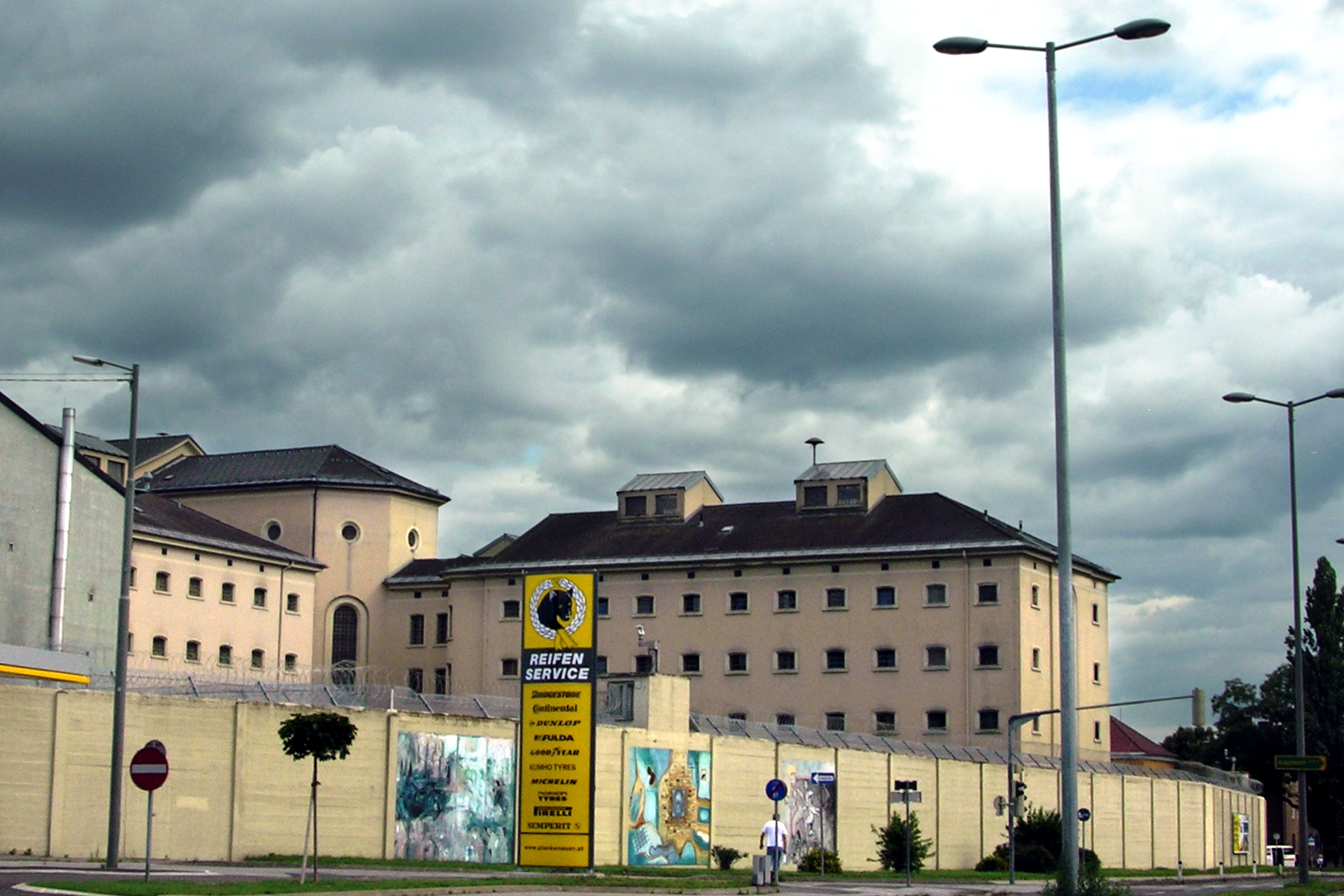
Graz-Karlau Prison (2008)

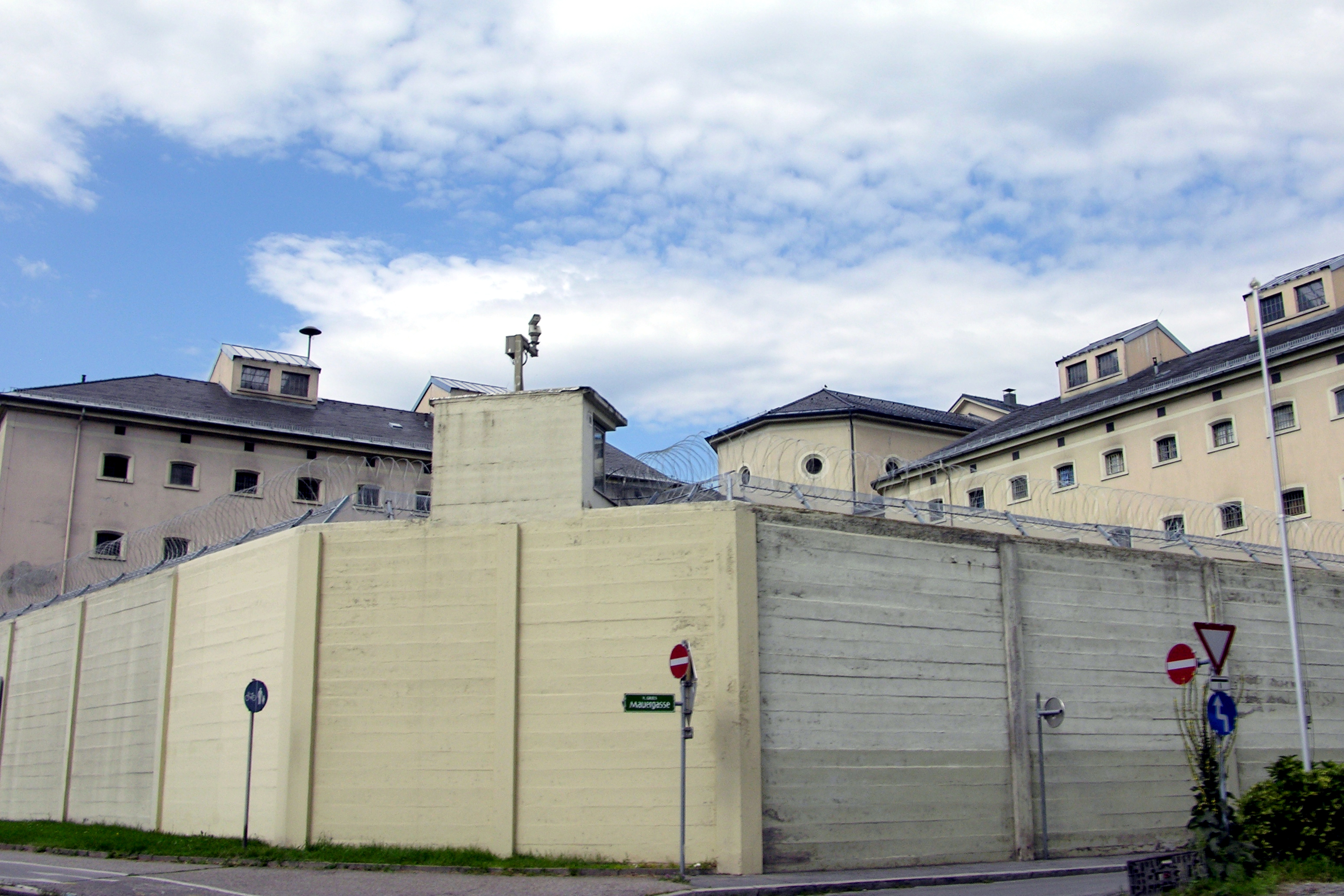
Outer wall of Graz-Karlau

Graz-Karlau Prison (German: Justizanstalt Graz-Karlau) is located in Gries, the 5th district of the city of Graz, capital of the Austrian state of Styria. With a capacity of 552 inmates, Graz-Karlau is the third-largest prison in Austria.

== History ==
Built between 1584 and 1590 in late Renaissance style to designs by Antonio Tade and Antonio Marmoro, it was used as a summer hunting residence for Archduke Karl II of Austria.

Originally, it was called "Dobel Castle". The German word "Dobel" is also written "Tobel", a deep, ravine-like valley or can also be a place and microtoponym. Because the castle's name was similar to the nearby Tobel hunting-lodge in Haselsdorf-Tobelbad, it was renamed Karlau, after the archduke.

From 1769 it was used as a workhouse and in 1794 started to keep French prisoners of war. In 1803, it became a provincial prison for inmates who had sentences of up to 10 years of imprisonment. In 1847 to 1848 and from 1869 to 1872, it was greatly enlarged. Toward the end of World War II, the prison was bombed twice, which killed 14 guards and 107 prisoners. In 1946, the British executioner Albert Pierrepoint travelled to Karlau to train an Austrian executioner and two assistants in the British method of long drop executions. Until then, condemned prisoners were hanged with short drops, effectively strangling them to death. Under the British method, Pierrepoint, the Austrian executioner and the two assistants hanged eight young displaced people for common crimes on 24 September 1946. A method which was continued until Austria abolished capital punishment on 30 June 1950.

The prison was renamed Graz-Karlau on 1 November 1993.

== Notable inmates ==
Among the prison's inmates, it houses or housed prisoners such as the serial killer Jack Unterweger; the letter and pipe bomb terrorist Franz Fuchs; the six-time murderer Udo Proksch; the suspected serial killer Wolfgang Ott and terrorist Tawfik Ben Chaovali, who was involved in the Rome and Vienna airport attacks.
