= Stanley Cross (executioner) =

English executioner

- Born: 9 September 1893; Southampton, Hampshire.
- Died: Unknown
- Occupation: Executioner
- Years active: 1932–1941

Stanley William Cross was an English executioner from Wormwood Scrubs. His career lasted from 1932 to 1941, during which he carried out four hangings as a chief executioner and assisted at 20 others.

Cross, an ex-serviceman, received training at Pentonville Prison in 1932. He assisted in his first hanging on 8 June 1933. Over the next few years, he usually worked as an assistant to Thomas Pierrepoint. He was finally promoted in 1940 and carried out his first commission as chief executioner on 31 July 1940. He also executed two German spies, Jose Waldeburg and Carl Meier, in December. However, Cross apparently miscalculated his prisoners' drop lengths.

He last appeared at an execution on 19 September 1941.

== See also ==
- List of executioners
