= Private sector participation in Nazi crimes =

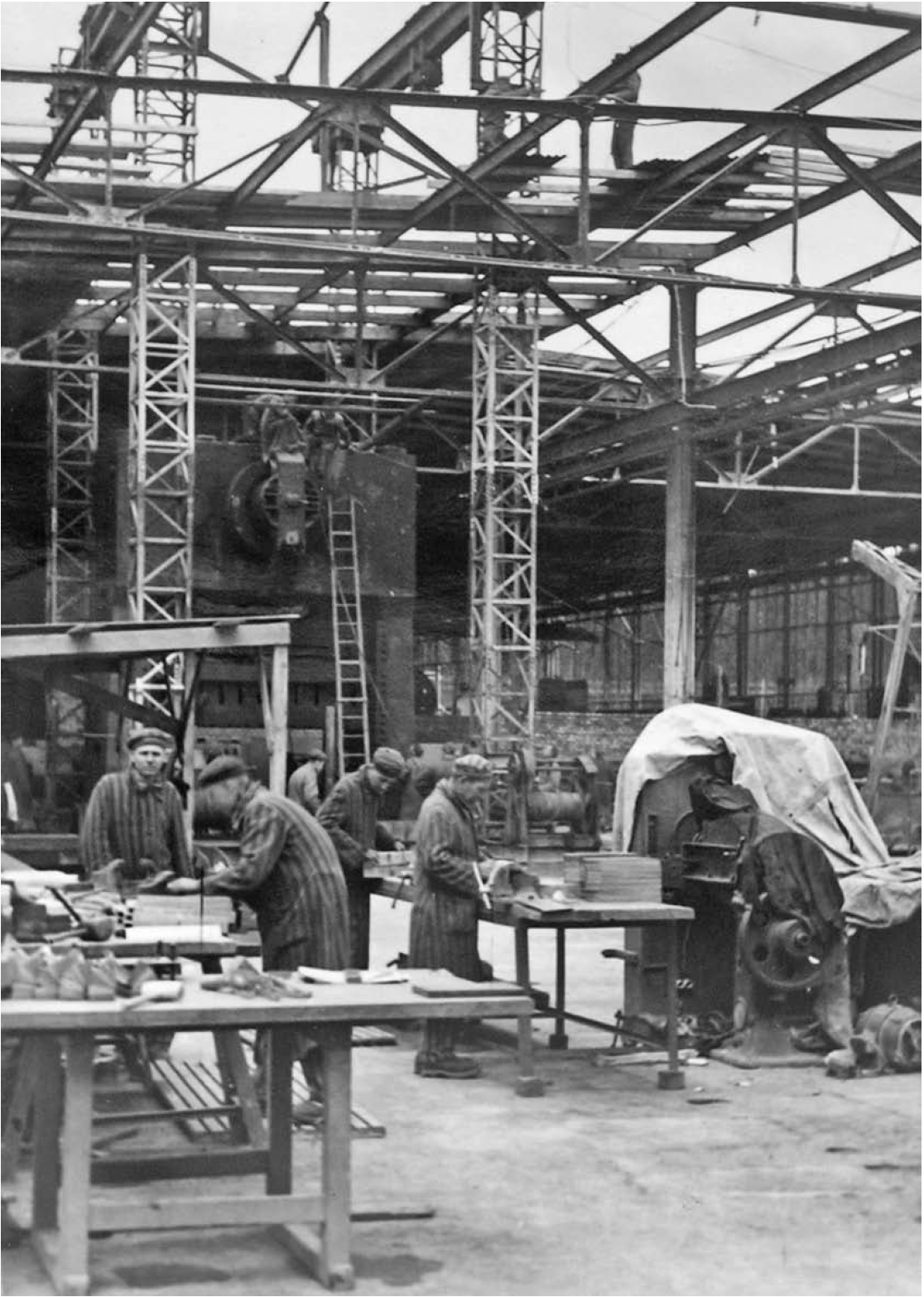
Concentration camp prisoners at a Messerschmitt aircraft factory

Private sector participation in Nazi crimes was extensive and included widespread use of forced labor in Nazi Germany and German-occupied Europe, confiscation of property from Jews and other victims by banks and insurance companies, and the transportation of people to Nazi concentration camps and extermination camps by rail. After the war, companies sought to downplay their participation in crimes and claimed that they were also victims of Nazi totalitarianism. However, the role of the private sector in Nazi Germany has been described as an example of state-corporate crime.

== Aryanization ==
Corporations participated extensively in the process of Aryanization, in which Jews were removed from the economy, in particular by dismissal from employment and confiscation of property. German banks helped in the takeovers of many Jewish companies. Many of these transactions were not profitable for the banks because they followed instructions that confiscated Jewish property should benefit the state. Following the invasion and annexation of other countries such as Austria, Poland, and Czechoslovakia, German banks also helped to Aryanize the Jewish companies there, in close cooperation with the Gestapo. German insurance companies such as Allianz, organized into the Reich Group for Insurance, agreed to pay out all claims related to the 1938 Kristallnacht pogrom to the state, on the grounds that the Jews had been responsible for the pogrom against themselves. By taking this action, they were able to avoid losing money. In November 1941, the insurance companies were ordered to report the assets of Jews who had emigrated or were deported and transfer the money to the state. The companies complained that they did not have the manpower to carry out these instructions, but they did not try to resist the confiscation. Companies also helped the SS sell gold and other property confiscated from Jews murdered by death squads and in the extermination camps. Deutsche Bank and Dresdner Bank laundered at least 744 kilograms (1,640 lb) of "victim gold" converted into bars by Degussa, selling the gold bars in Turkey for foreign currency.

== Forced labor ==
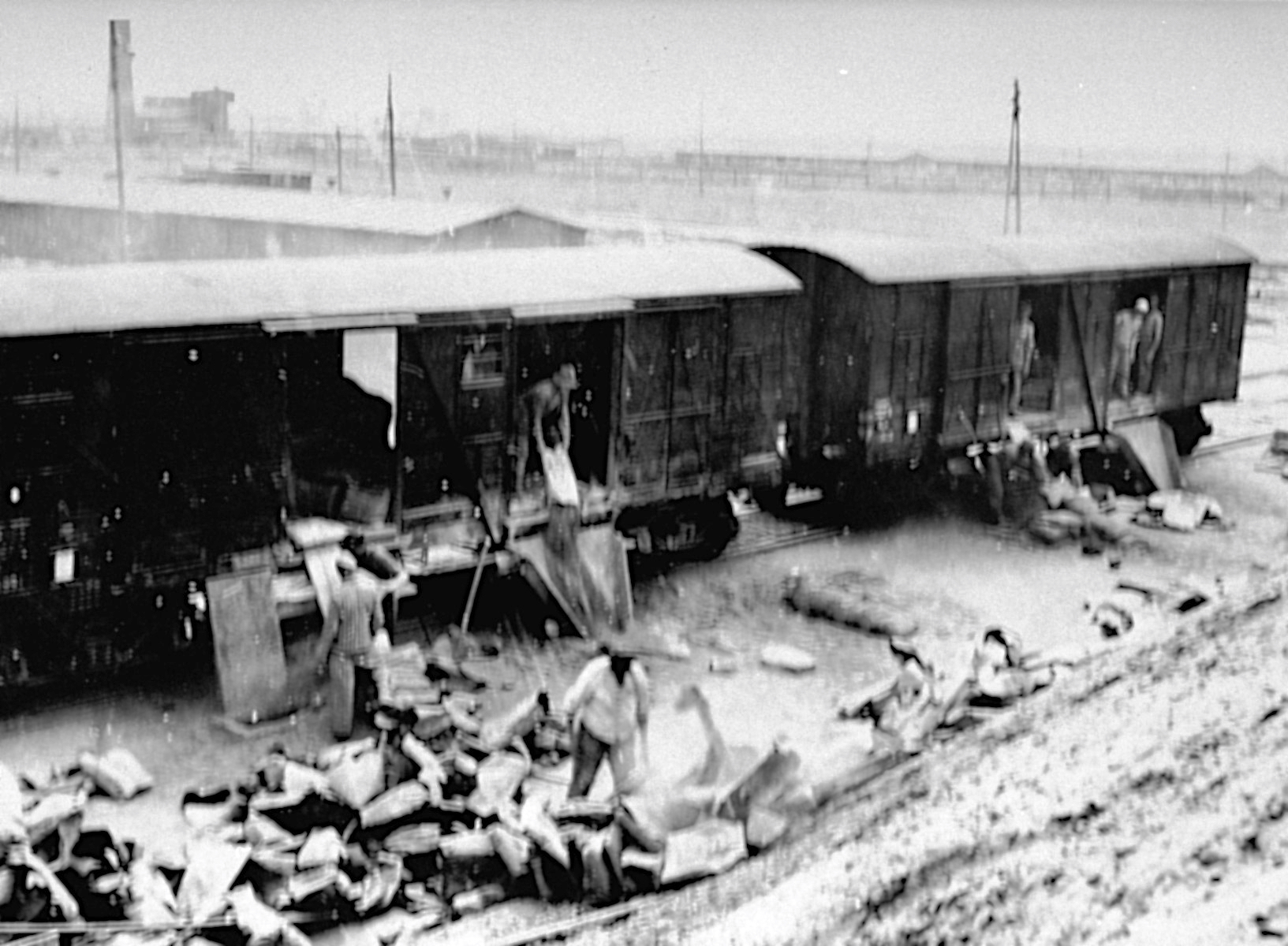
Monowitz prisoners unload cement from trains. The photograph was entered into evidence at the IG Farben trial.

Beginning in 1941, private sector companies leased concentration camp prisoners for forced labor projects. The most notorious example is IG Farben's factory at Monowitz concentration camp. An estimated 35,000 prisoners were forced to work there, of whom 25,000 died. Other major users of forced labor were the Krupp and Flick concerns; Flick used 40,000 slave laborers at one time from the start of the war, more than any other steel company. Subsidiaries of United States companies in Germany also used slave labor during the war.

The price to hire concentration camp prisoners was, until the end of 1942, three or four Reichsmarks daily. This price included the clothing and food of prisoners as well as hiring SS guard details, but the companies had to pay for accommodation and medical care. Therefore, they had a significant effect on the conditions in the camps. Prisoners did not receive any of the money. The per diem cost encouraged employers to push for the extension of the working day as much as possible, which increased the mortality rate of prisoners.

== Nazi human experimentation ==
IG Farben, arranged for Nazi human experimentation to be carried out on unwilling prisoners at Buchenwald, Auschwitz, and Mauthausen. During these experiments, prisoners were deliberately infected with typhus to see whether a drug would be effective. In both treatment and control groups, 50 percent died.

== Mass murders ==
The genocide of Jews and others was facilitated by technologies sold by German companies. Degesch, a subsidiary of IG Farben and Degussa, produced Zyklon B gas, marketed by Tesch & Stabenow. Although it was mostly used for the killing of lice and other pests, about 3 percent of the gas was used for the mass killing of prisoners at Auschwitz-Birkenau and other Nazi concentration camps. The directors of the companies were well aware that the gas was used for the mass murder of humans. Topf and Sons built the crematoria of Auschwitz-Birkenau and other concentration camps, and also built ventilation systems for the gas chambers so that prisoners could be murdered more efficiently.

Nederlandse Spoorwegen, the Dutch railway company, was paid the equivalent of 3 million euros (2019) for transporting more than 100,000 Jews from the Netherlands to concentration and extermination camps.

== Prosecution ==
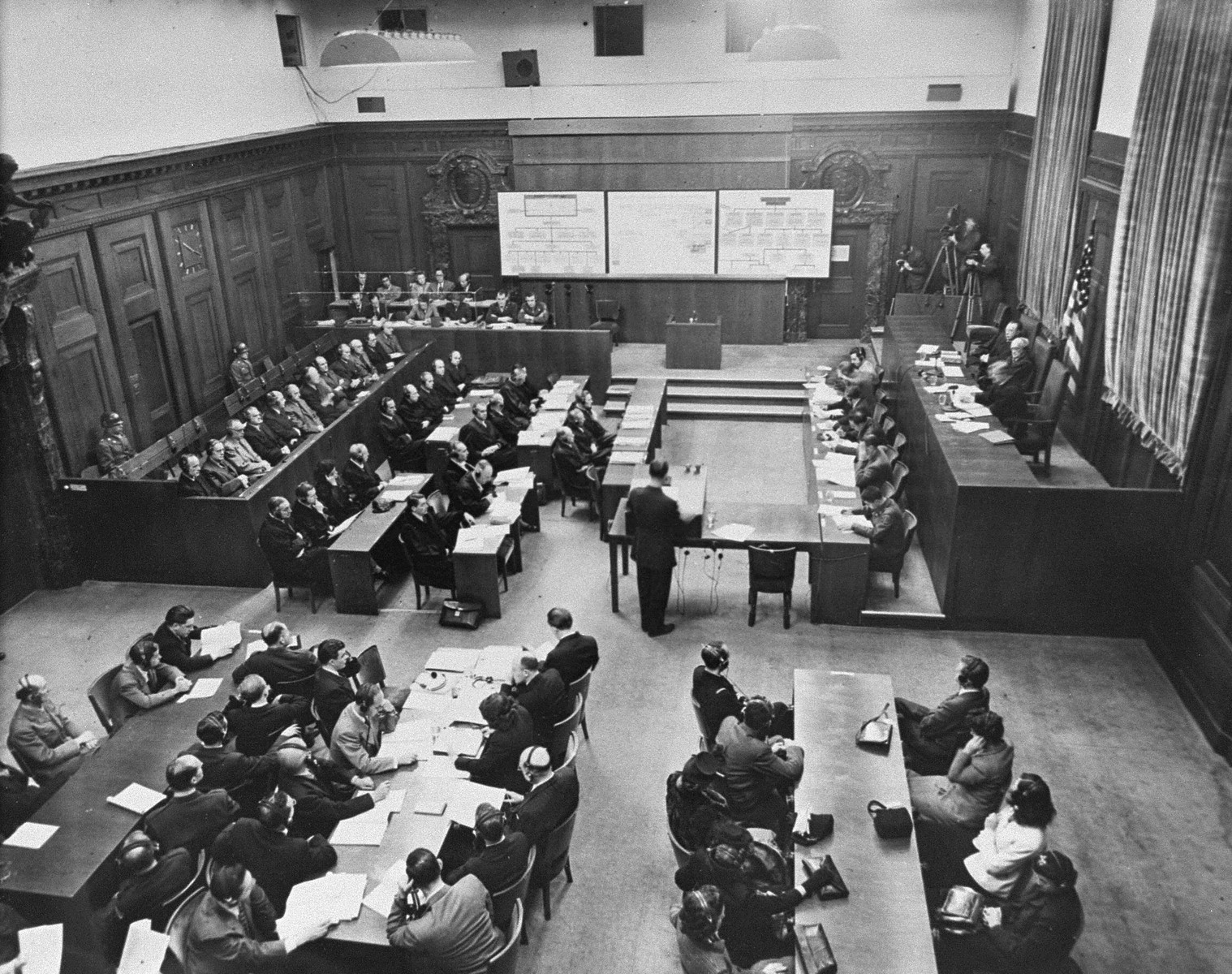
Prosecutor Telford Taylor (standing, center) opens the case against the defendants in the Krupp trial

Individuals and companies in the private sector faced prosecutions and restitution claims after the war for their wrongdoing; however, most were reluctant to take responsibility for their actions. Three of the subsequent Nuremberg trials (Flick trial, IG Farben trial, and Krupp trial) concerned crimes by companies in Nazi Germany. In the Flick and IG Farben trials, the judges accepted the defendants' arguments of necessity in the use of forced labor. The blanket application of the necessity defence effectively nullified the doctrine that superior orders did not exculpate crimes. Grietje Baars writes that the judges resorted to "absurd contradictions" in order to justify lenient verdicts in the context of the Cold War. All convicted industrialists remaining in prison were released by John J. McCloy, the United States High Commissioner of Germany, by 1951, and most confiscated assets were also returned. Many of the convicted businessmen returned to running companies. Some other German businessmen were convicted in denazification trials.

Bruno Tesch, the owner of Tesch & Stabenow, as well as his co-executive, Karl Weinbacher, were both sentenced to death by a British military court after being found guilty as accomplices to murder for supplying Zyklon B to concentration camps, including Auschwitz, knowing how it would be used. Both men were executed, and were the only civilian businessman to be put to death for their roles in the Holocaust in Western Europe.

== Restitution claims ==
Business leaders denied responsibility for the use of forced labor and often claimed, incorrectly, that they had been forced to employ forced labor by Nazi fiat, when in fact they had sought out these prisoners in order to increase their profits and survive the war. Along with portraying themselves as victims of the Nazi regime, industrialists who had used forced labor claimed to have been Nazi opponents. While pursuing claims of Jewish forced laborers against the Flick concern, Benjamin Ferencz observed the "interesting phenomenon of history and psychology that very frequently the criminal comes to see himself as the victim". Likewise, historian Jonathan Wiesen observed that the "language of self-victimization" was frequently used by companies in negotiations over restitution, as they carried out a "self-pitying" attempt to contain the corporate responsibility and liability for Nazi crimes. The companies commissioned several books arguing that they had not been responsible for any crimes, which were blamed exclusively on the Nazi regime.

During an early claim by Auschwitz survivor Norbert Wollheim against IG Farben, the company hired a team of lawyers who argued that the company had actually protected prisoners from SS murder policies. In the 1990s, civil proceedings in the United States led to new settlements with survivors and heirs receiving some compensation. A major settlement in 1999 created a fund of 10 billion Deutsche Marks to compensate survivors. However, Wiesen observes that this was "less an expression of contrition than a pragmatic response to survivors' legal actions".

== See also ==
- Adolf Hitler Fund of German Trade and Industry
- Business collaboration with Nazi Germany
- Economy of Nazi Germany
- Freundeskreis der Wirtschaft
- Industrielleneingabe
- List of companies involved in the Holocaust
- Nazi Billionaires
- Secret Meeting of 20 February 1933
