= West German Industry and the Challenge of the Nazi Past =

2001 book by S. Jonathan Wiesen

- Author: S. Jonathan Wiesen
- Language: English
- Genre: Non-fiction
- Publisher: University of North Carolina Press
- Publication date: 2001
- Publication place: United States

West German Industry and the Challenge of the Nazi Past is a book by American historian S. Jonathan Wiesen, published by University of North Carolina Press in 2001. It focuses on how West German industrialists whitewashed their participation in Nazi crimes during the ten years after the war.
