= Topf and Sons =

1878–1996 German engineering company

J. A. Topf & Söhne
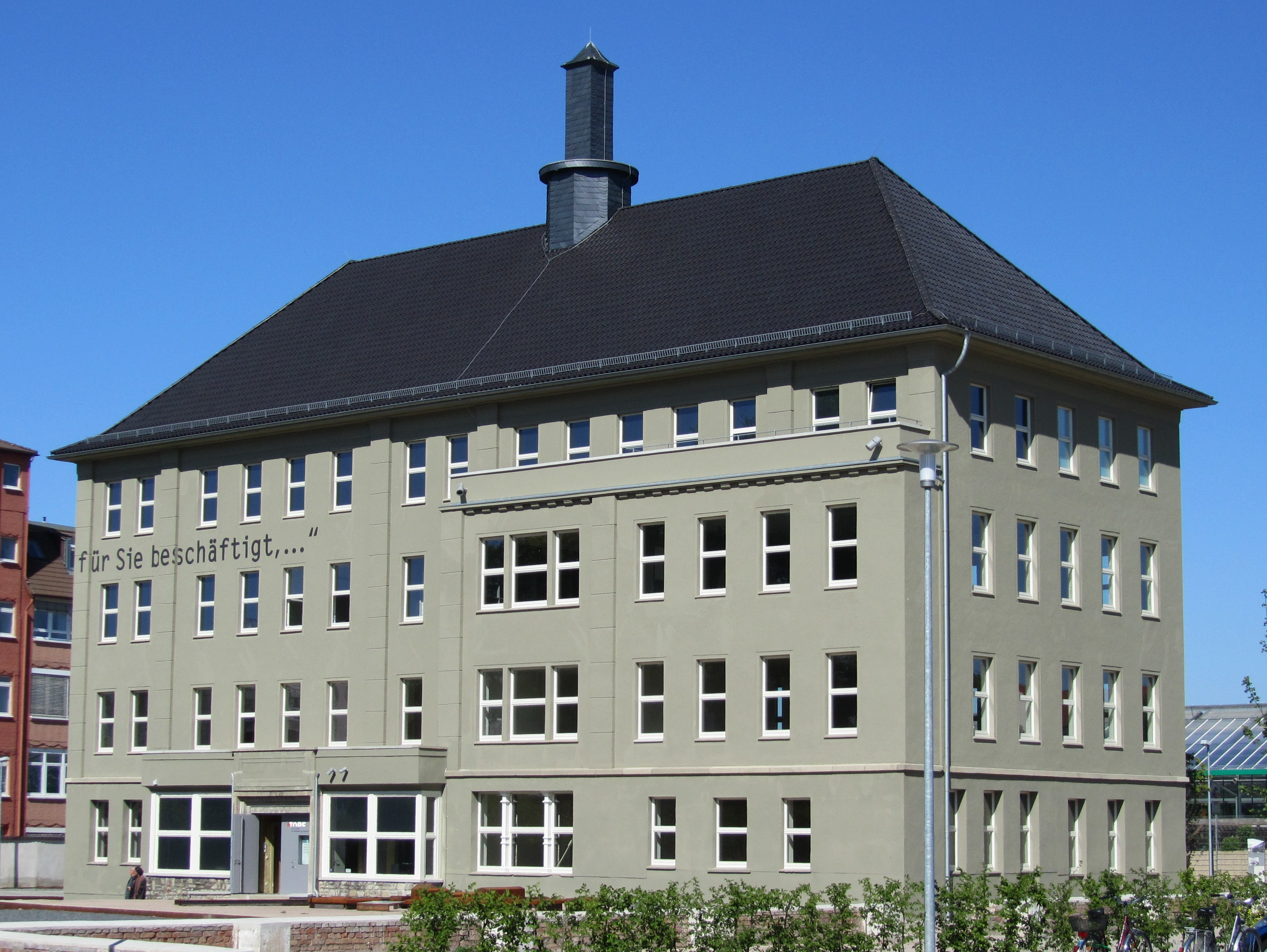
- Former administration building
- Industry: Machine industry
- Founded: 1878; 148 years ago
- Founder: Johannes Andreas Topf (1816–1891)
- Defunct: 1996
- Fate: Nationalized (1946); Privatized (1993); Bankrupt (1996)
- Successors: Topfwerke Erfurt VEB (1946); NAGEMA VEB "Nikos Belojannis" (1952); VEB EMS (1957)
- Headquarters: Erfurt, Germany
- Products: Heating, brewing & incineration equipment, silos, chimneys; Munitions, Luftwaffe aircraft parts; Nazi concentration camp crematoria and gas chamber ventilation
- Revenue: 7 million RM (1941)
- Number of employees: 1,150 (1939)
- Website: Topf & Söhne Memorial Site

J. A. Topf and Sons (German: J. A. Topf & Söhne) was an engineering company, founded in 1878 in Erfurt, Germany by Johannes Andreas Topf (1816–1891). Originally, it made heating systems and brewing and malting equipment. Later, the company diversified into silos, chimneys, incinerators for burning municipal waste, and crematoria. During World War I, it made weapons shells, limbers (carts for carrying artillery) and other military vehicles. In World War II, it also made weapons shells and aircraft parts for the Luftwaffe.

J. A. Topf and Sons was the largest of 12 companies that designed and built crematorium ovens for concentration and extermination camps during the Holocaust, planned and carried out by the Nazi regime from 1935 to 1945. It also made ventilation systems for the gas chambers at Auschwitz II–Birkenau. Topf & Söhne's main competitor in making concentration camp ovens was the Berlin firm H. Kori GmbH, founded in 1887.

At its peak, Topf & Söhne was the largest company of its type in the world. It sold its products globally, as far afield as Russia, Asia, North and South America, Australia, and New Zealand. In the 1940s, less than 2% of its total business came from its concentration camp contracts.

In addition to Auschwitz and Auschwitz II–Birkenau, Topf & Söhne built crematorium ovens for Buchenwald, Dachau, Mauthausen-Gusen, Mogilev ghetto, and the Gross-Rosen concentration camp. Of the five ovens at Dachau concentration camp, four were made by H. Kori and one by Topf & Söhne. In all, Topf built 25 crematorium ovens which had a total of 76 incineration chambers (called 'muffles') for concentration camps. H. Kori built 42 single-chamber ovens at various camps.

Epithets such as "the engineers of the final solution" and "the technicians of mass murder" have been applied to Topf & Söhne, because, to a greater extent than its competitors, it used its considerable expertise to assist the Nazi regime to make mass execution into an efficient, industrial process.

From 1941, Topf & Söhne used forced labour in its factory, as did many other German firms in the Nazi period. At least 620 foreigners were forced to work for the company. These people received wages, but they were paid 25–30% less than the German employees. After the war, the company was confiscated and nationalised by the Soviet administration. The company's history was not fully researched until after German reunification in 1990.

The site of the former factory is now a Holocaust memorial site and a museum. It is the only memorial of its type relating to a civilian company's collaboration in the Holocaust.

== Early history ==
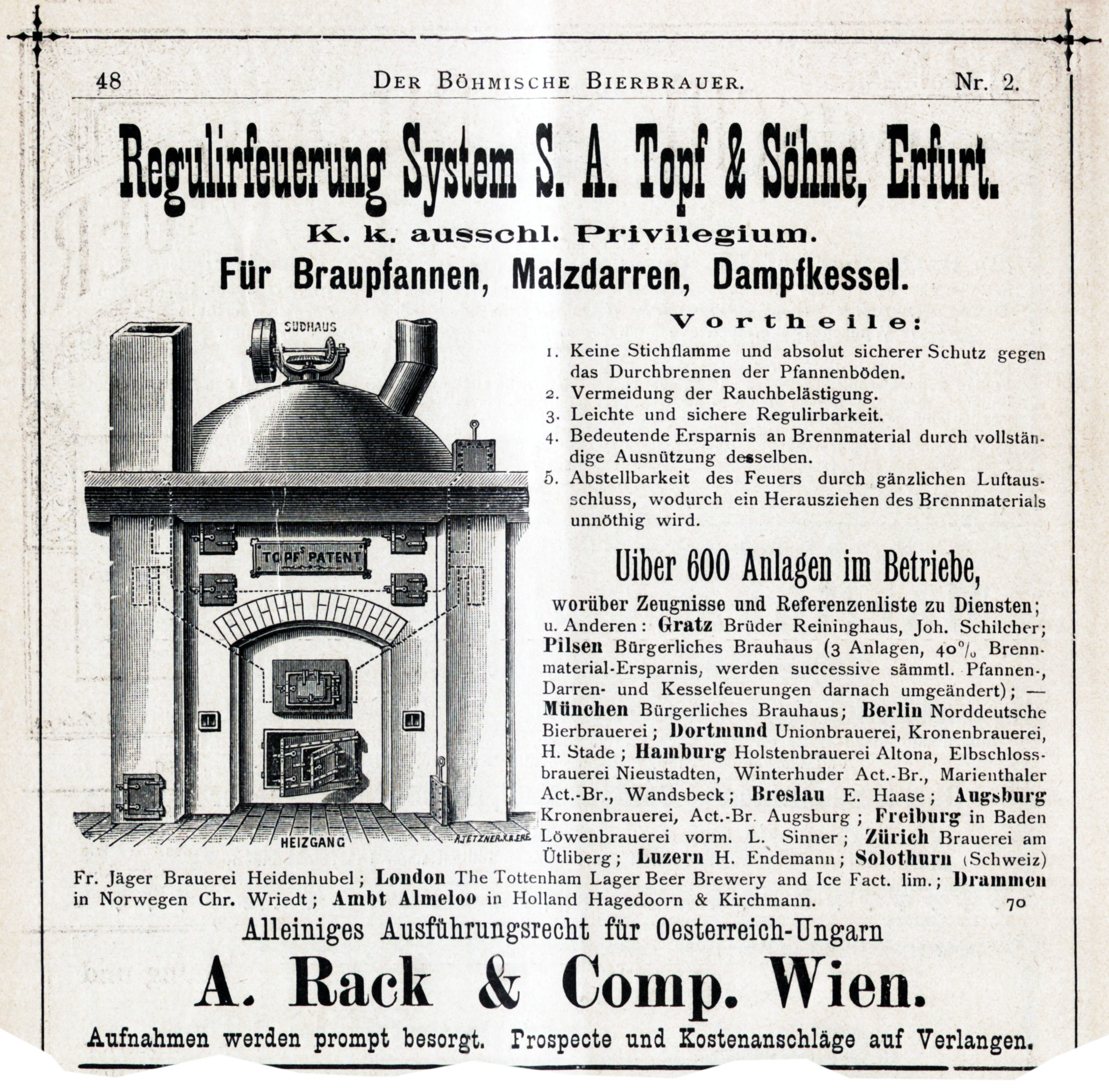
An 1891 advert for a Topf & Söhne patented brewery heating system, listing companies who had bought some of the 600 units already sold

When Johannes Topf founded the firm on 1 July 1878 he was already 62 years old. He owned his own brewery and had also worked in the fuel technology industry. He established the new company to sell a system for heating brewing coppers which he had invented and patented.

He had four sons: Gustav (1853–1893); Albert (1857–1896); Max Julius Ernst, known as Julius (1859–1914) and Wilhelm Louis, known as Ludwig, (1863–1914). A fifth son died in childhood. He founded the firm against the advice of his sons, although the younger two sons, Julius and Ludwig, joined him. By 1885 J.A. Topf & Söhne was producing heating, brewing and malting systems and working collaboratively with other firms to sell products all over Germany and beyond. The two older brothers also joined the company in the late 1880s, but they both died by the mid-1890s; Gustav, aged 40 and Albert, aged 39. Johannes Topf died in 1891, and in 1904 Julius Topf stepped down to become a sleeping partner due to ill health, leaving Ludwig managing it on his own.

The company began manufacturing incinerators for burning municipal waste and, from 1914, crematoria for local authorities, due to the increasing acceptability of cremation as a means of body disposal. By 1914, it was one of the largest firms of its type in the world, employing over 500 staff and exporting to 50 countries.

Ludwig Topf was wealthy and successful, but committed suicide in February 1914, aged 51, due to the stress of running the business. His brother Julius died of blood poisoning later the same year. With the second generation of the Topf brothers all dead, Else Topf (1882–1940), Ludwig's widow, became the owner. The firm's senior managers already had a lot of independence and operations continued without any major upheaval. It prospered during World War I due to contracts for weapons shells and military vehicles.

== Third generation ==
Ludwig and Else Topf had three children: Johanna, known as Hanna, (1902–?); Ludwig (1903–1945), and Ernst Wolfgang (1904–1979). When their father died, the two sons, aged 10 and 9, were sent away to a boarding school. The brothers later became the owners and managers of the firm during the Nazi period.

After leaving school, Ludwig studied machine engineering at the Technische Hochschule Hannover, now the University of Hannover. After graduating from Hannover, he spent a further five years at Leipzig, Berlin, and Rostock universities, studying a wide range of subjects, including economics, law, and sociology. Ernst also studied at Hannover, but took business studies. He returned to Erfurt to do two six-month internships, one in a bank and another in a malting company. He then joined Ludwig in Leipzig, studying at the Handelshochschule, now the Leipzig Graduate School of Management, graduating in 1929.

In 1929, Ernst was employed at Topf & Söhne, and in 1931 Ludwig also joined the firm. In the early 1930s, due to the economic crisis of the Weimar Republic, the company lost business to such an extent that by Spring 1933 it was in danger of bankruptcy. Because of this, at the end of 1932, the brothers were made redundant. They were banned from the company site, due to a rift with their mother, who would not speak to them, and because of political problems. Else Topf was also estranged from her daughter, whose marriage she disapproved of.

This was happening against a backdrop of rising Nazism. The Nazi party first gained seats in the German parliament in 1928. In the 1932 elections they became the second largest party; Adolf Hitler became chancellor in March 1933.

The influence of Nazi staff within the firm also grew. The Topf brothers wanted to return and manage the firm, but at a company works council meeting on 30 January 1933, they were labelled "Judengenossen" (friends of Jews) and not suitable to lead the company. Else Topf supported this stance. The brothers, like their father, did have many good relationships with Jewish friends, neighbours and business contacts. However, for appearances' sake, they were persuaded to join the Nazi party, in April 1933. The ambitious engineer Kurt Prüfer joined at the same time. They were then permitted to return and were appointed joint managers, with Ludwig as the technical manager, and Ernst as the business manager.

== Concentration camp crematoria ==
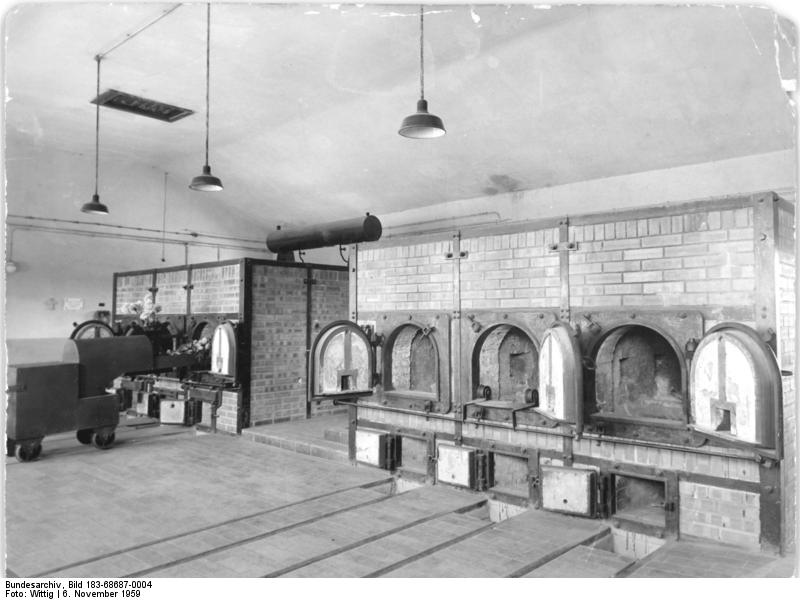
The crematorium at Buchenwald, showing the two, triple-muffle ovens, 1959

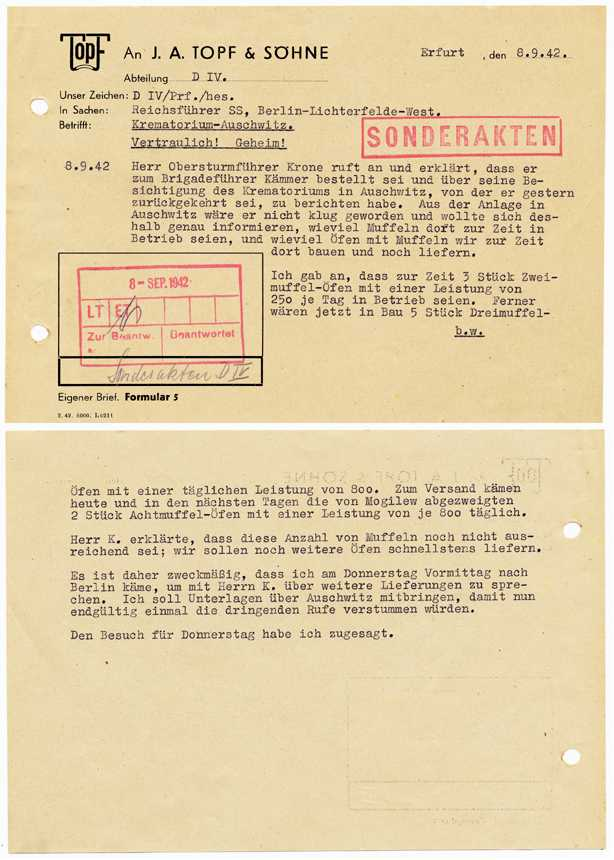
Internal memo 8 Sep 1942, regarding an order for Auschwitz ovens. See citation for a translation.

Kurt Prüfer, the head of Topf & Söhne's small crematoria department, was the main oven designer. He developed a two-muffle transportable oven in September 1939, which was delivered to Dachau concentration camp in November 1939. A 'muffle' is the incineration chamber where the body is put. In order to improve the speed at which bodies burned, the muffles were internally joined, resulting in the ashes of individual bodies being mixed. This was illegal, but all subsequent multi-muffle ovens built for the concentration camps were designed in the same way. A further four, single-muffle ovens were built at Dachau by Topf & Söhne's competitor H. Kori.

Initially, Buchenwald camp, which opened in July 1937, sent bodies to the local Weimar city crematorium. From April 1938 to March 1939, 90% of all cremations at Weimar came from Buchenwald. The unusually high numbers looked suspicious, so the SS wanted their own on-site facilities, although it was illegal for crematoria to be outside of local authority control. A Topf transportable, double-muffle oven was delivered in winter 1939/40, and two, three-muffle stationary ovens were ordered. As with all Topf & Söhne stationary ovens, the parts were made in the factory in Erfurt, and the firm's staff went on site to build them, often spending months at the camps. One staff member, Martin Holich, spent almost 12 months in 1942–43 installing and repairing equipment at Auschwitz-Birkenau.

The muffles of the concentration camp ovens were smaller than those for civil crematoria, because no space for a coffin was needed, which saved both space and fuel. Prüfer later designed ovens with muffles large enough for multiple bodies to be burned simultaneously. Later, in Topf & Söhne's instructions on using the ovens, they advised adding bodies to the muffles at 20-minute intervals as the previous body burned down. Bodies were often pushed in four, five or even six at once.

In addition to making ovens for Buchenwald, Auschwitz and Dachau, Topf & Söhne also supplied a transportable double-muffle oven and a stationary double-muffle oven for Mauthausen-Gusen, a triple-muffle oven at Groß-Rosen and a four-muffle oven at Mogilev ghetto. It is also thought that they supplied transportable ovens to at least one of the Nazi euthanasia institutions, in which a total of over 70,000 physically and mentally disabled people were murdered in 1940 and 1941.

=== Auschwitz I and II ===
From August 1940 to May 1942, Topf & Söhne built three double-muffle ovens at Auschwitz I. In October 1941, the SS placed an order for five three-muffle ovens for the new Auschwitz-Birkenau extermination camp (Auschwitz II), where it was initially estimated that over 1000 people per day would die. According to calculations made by the Zentralbauleitung der Waffen-SS und Polizei Auschwitz on 28 June 1943, the crematoria could burn 4,416 corpses per day—1,440 each in crematoria II and III, and 768 each in crematoria IV and V. This meant that the crematoria could potentially burn over 1.6 million corpses per year, however, the actual numbers were lower.

The first transport of Jews arrived at Auschwitz I on 26 March 1942. To deal with the increased demand for body disposal, Topf & Söhne installed a further two 8-muffle ovens in September 1942. An additional five triple-muffle ovens were installed at Auschwitz II by mid-March 1943.

Surviving Sonderkommando prisoners assigned to burn the bodies stated that all four of Auschwitz II's crematoria had the capacity to cremate a total of 8000 bodies per day, although the actual numbers were usually lower. From 1942 until spring 1944 about 1000 people per day were transported to Auschwitz, although not all of them were killed. In the summer of 1944, almost 437,000 Hungarian Jews were transported to the camp and during this period up to 9,000 bodies per day, and sometimes as many as 10,000 per day, were cremated in the ovens, as well as in outdoor burning pits. Crematorium IV was out of use from May 1943, after only two months of service, because it developed cracks. From March 1943 until November 1944, nearly 1 million people were murdered and disposed of at the camp.

== Observations, innovations and patent applications ==
In December 1939, a patent application was made for Prüfer's double-muffle transportable cremation unit, although it was not approved, possibly because of the legal problem of ash mixing.

On 26 October 1942, the engineer Fritz Sander, Prüfer's manager, applied for a patent for what he called a "continuous operation corpse incineration oven for mass use". This was a four-storey oven designed for Auschwitz II. The idea was that the bodies would be loaded by a type of conveyor belt and the heat of the bodies already in the oven would ignite them, thus, after an initial heating period, it would remain in continuous operation without the need for any further fuel – the heat of burning corpses would keep the apparatus running. Prüfer and Sander, who disliked each other and competed with one another, disagreed about how well the device would work in practice. It was never built.

=== Gas chamber exhaust fans ===
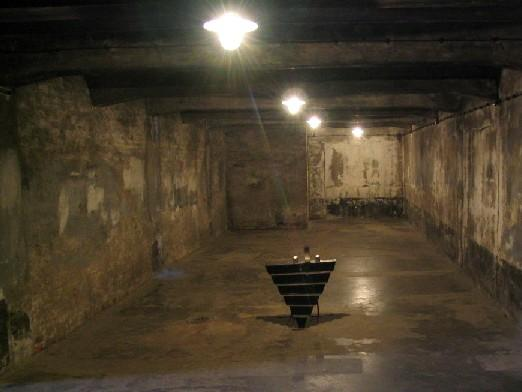
Auschwitz gas chamber, 2003

In early 1943, the Topf & Söhne fitter Heinrich Messing installed exhaust fans in the Auschwitz II crematoria and also in the gas chambers. Initially, the process of gassing prisoners and then letting fresh air into the gas chambers lasted several hours, but after the exhaust fans were installed this was reduced to about an hour, thus reducing the turn around time.

=== On site observations ===
Topf & Söhne engineers and other staff visited the concentration camps many times, not only to install and repair equipment, but also to observe processes to help make them more efficient. Before crematoria II, III and IV at Auschwitz II were officially put into operation, on 5 March 1943, in the presence of high-ranking SS officers from Berlin, camp authorities and Topf & Söhne staff, a test of crematorium II was held to measure the speed at which bodies could be disposed of. Those present observed the bodies being put in the ovens and burned. They used stop-watches to time the process and took notes.

On 13 March 1943 the engineer Karl Schultze and Heinrich Messing witnessed a test sample of 1,492 Jews from Kraków Ghetto being killed in the gas chambers at Auschwitz II and then cremated. Karl Schultze later gave a full report about this to Ludwig Topf. Messing, who was a communist, not a Nazi, spent from January to June 1943 working at the camp. In an interview given in 2005, his daughter Hildegard who was 16 in 1943, said she would never forget him saying on his return, "If what I have seen comes out, we will all be wading up to our knees in blood".

== Use of forced labour ==
From 1941 until the end of the war at least 620 people were engaged as forced labour (German:Zwangsarbeiter). Most of them came from France, Italy, the Soviet Union and Belgium. There were also small numbers of Poles, Dutch, Croatians and Czechs. The majority of the French, Soviets and Italians were prisoners of war. Barracks that could accommodate 52 Zwangsarbeiter were built on the Topf & Söhne factory site. The Zwangsarbeiter had to work 56 hours per week in comparison with the 42 hours worked by German employees, although they were paid 25–30% less. In addition, deductions were made for food and accommodation, and other costs. Abuse is known to have occurred; the camp manager, Wilhelm Buchröder, a Nazi, was dismissed in 1944 by Ernst Topf for beating Zwangsarbeiter, although it is reported that his successor also mistreated them.

== End of World War II and afterwards ==
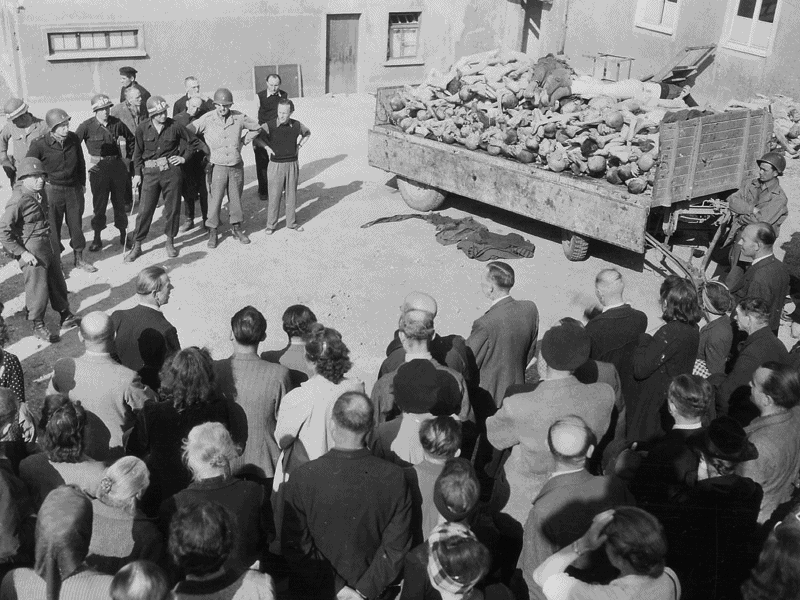
U.S. Army soldiers make the citizens of Weimar view Buchenwald concentration camp.

Auschwitz and Auschwitz-Birkenau concentration camps were liberated by the Red Army on the 26 and 27 January 1945. To try to conceal what had been going on, the SS blew up the crematoria and gas chambers before the Soviet troops arrived. However, in an administration office at Birkenau camp, the Soviets found documentation relating to Topf & Söhne, detailing "the construction of the technology of mass death, complete with the precise costs of crematoria and calculations of the number of corpses each could incinerate in a day".

In April 1945, Erfurt and Buchenwald were liberated by the US Army. It had already been agreed in the Yalta Conference, held in February 1945, that the area would come under Soviet control after the Germans had been defeated. It was handed over on 3 July 1945. In 1949 the Soviet Occupied Zone became the German Democratic Republic (East Germany).

At Buchenwald, liberated on 11 April, the crematoria ovens remained intact. The Americans forced the citizens of nearby Weimar to walk through the camp to witness what had been going on. They also filmed the camp, including the crematoria, with the camera pointedly focusing on the J.A. Topf & Söhne logo and manufacturer's name plate attached to the ovens. The film and still photographs of the camp were shown around the world. Film from Buchenwald and other concentration camps was used as evidence at the Nuremberg Trials.

The US Army's Counter Intelligence Corps (CIC) started to investigate Topf & Söhne within a few days of the Buchenwald liberation, and took company documents.

=== Ludwig Topf ===
On 27 April 1945, Ludwig Topf organised a meeting with company's works council at which it was agreed that the line to be taken with investigators was that workers and management knew that the ovens were delivered to concentration camps, but that they did not know the details of what was going on. Topf committed suicide on 31 May 1945, by cyanide poisoning. A senior engineer, Kurt Prüfer, was arrested the day before, and Topf was warned that he was about to be arrested himself. He left a suicide note claiming that he and his brother were innocent and that he was the 'opposite' of a Nazi, but he thought he would be used as a scapegoat anyway. He was unmarried and had no children. He had a reputation as a womaniser and was living with his secretary, 19 years his junior, at the time of his death.

=== Ernst Wolfgang Topf ===
At the end of June 1945, Ernst Topf travelled to an insurance company in Stuttgart, then in the French occupied zone, to collect a 300,000 Reichsmark life insurance payout that was due following his brother Ludwig's death. Erfurt was handed over to the Soviet administration on 3 July, and Soviets would not give Topf permission to return. From October 1945 he went to live in the town of Gudensberg, in the district Fritzlar-Homberg, in the American zone, where his niece, the daughter of his sister Hanna, was working for the American military administration.

In 1951 Topf founded a new company, in Wiesbaden, to make crematoria and refuse incinerators. He used the old family firm's name, J.A. Topf & Söhne, hoping to capitalise on its good reputation prior to World War II. However, his business never did well. After the truth about the concentration camps was exposed, Topf & Söhne's involvement was quite widely known. Topf moved the company to Mainz in 1954. There was further bad publicity when the book Macht ohne Moral ('Power without Morals') was published in 1957. The book contains photographs of piles of bodies and crematoria at various concentration camps. It also includes transcripts of two documents from the original Topf company, making its collaboration with the SS clear. The company went bankrupt in May 1963. Topf's wife Erika, aged 52, died in April 1963. They had two children.

==== Investigations into Ernst Topf ====
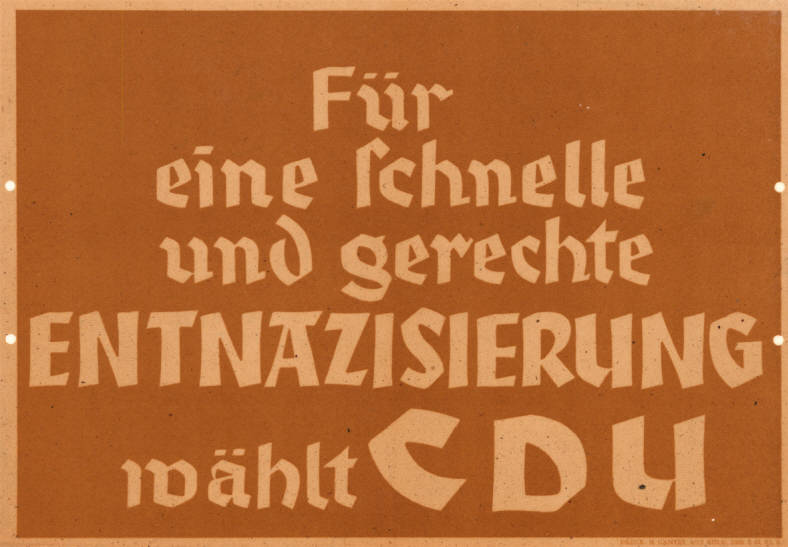
A poster from the North Rhine-Westphalia state elections 1947, with the slogan "For a quick and just denazification vote CDU"

Topf, now living in the American occupied zone, was arrested by the American CIC on 25 March 1946. He was held in custody and interrogated for two or three weeks and then let go. He maintained that the ovens they had delivered to the concentration camps were standard equipment, of the same type that they made for city crematoria for civilian use and claimed that if they had refused to work with the SS they would have been severely punished.

Later, in December 1946, because of his membership of the Nazi party, the Fritzlar-Homberg Spruchkammer, a German civilian denazification court, started investigating Ernst Topf. About 8.5 million Germans had been members of the party and the Spruchkammer were set up to investigate them. Topf was required to provide two sworn witness statements regarding his non-Nazi political leanings – two employees of Topf & Söhne provided these and vouched for him. The Spruchkammer had difficulties in getting evidence, partly due to a lack of co-operation between American officials and officials in Soviet occupied Erfurt.

In March 1948 the Spruchkammer in Wiesbaden, where Topf had moved to, took over his files. This closed at the end of 1949 and Topf's file was handed over to the Wiesbaden state prosecutors office, where investigations into him as an accessory to murder for his role in the Holocaust began. However, important witness statements were lost and Soviet authorities in Erfurt were no longer interested in assisting with the case. The investigation was suspended in 1951.

In 1959 the state prosecutors in Frankfurt reopened investigations into Topf. Two further legal proceedings followed in 1962 but neither resulted in a formal charge. Topf died in 1979. He never made any apology for Topf & Söhne's involvement with the Nazi regime.

=== Staff ===
Kurt Prüfer (1891–1952), a senior engineer and the main designer of the ovens, was initially arrested by the American CIC on 30 May 1945 and interrogated. He was released three weeks later and returned to work.

On 1 March 1946 the firm was given a large contract for malting and brewing equipment by the reparations department of the Soviet military, however a few days later, four engineers of the firm were arrested. These were Kurt Prüfer, Fritz Sander (1876–1946), Karl Schultze (1900-died after 1955) and Gustav Braun (1889–1958). Braun, also a qualified engineer, was the factory's production manager.

Fritz Sander, Prüfer's manager, who was 70, died of heart failure on 26 March 1946 in Berlin, three weeks after his arrest and after four interrogation sessions. He is quoted as saying during the interrogations "I was a German engineer and key member of the Topf works and I saw it as my duty to apply my specialist knowledge in this way in order to help Germany win the war, just as an aircraft construction engineer builds airplanes in wartime, which are also connected with the destruction of human beings."

Over the next two years, the other three men remained in custody and were interrogated in Germany and in Moscow, where, on 17 April 1948, they were sentenced to 25 years in a Russian labour camp. That was the highest sentence that could be given without having a full trial. Prüfer died in October 1952 of a stroke while in prison. In 1955 Schultze and Braun were released early.

=== Nationalisation of company ===
As Ernst Topf was now in western Germany and his brother Ludwig was dead, Topf & Söhne was declared an "ownerless company" and in 1946 it was taken over by the state and renamed "Topfwerke Erfurt VEB". It was made a subsidiary of VVB NAGEMA, a group of East German state-owned engineering companies. In 1952 it was renamed "NAGEMA VEB Maschinenfabrik 'Nikos Belojannis'", after a Greek communist who had been an inmate in a German concentration camp in Greece. The company's crematoria department was closed in 1955 and in 1957 it stopped production of all forms of combustion machinery and was renamed VEB Erfurter Mälzerei- und Speicherbau (VEB EMS, "Erfurt Oasthouse and Granary Construction"). It was privatised in 1993 after German reunification and it went bankrupt in 1996.

== After German reunification ==
=== Property claim ===
After German reunification in 1990, over 2.5 million claims were made for restitution of property that had been confiscated during the Nazi period, or by the East German government. Some descendants of the Topf family made a claim for the former family villa and factory in Erfurt which had been made state property. It was refused in 1992, because property confiscated during the Soviet occupation period could not be claimed. However, the family made a further claim for financial compensation. In 1994 Sabine Leutheusser-Schnarrenberger, the German Justice Minister, also refused that claim because, she said, the factory was used to manufacture the "murder machinery of the extermination camp."

Hartmut Topf (born 1934), a grandson of Julius Topf, publicly criticised the attempt to claim back the property, saying that they should not profit from Holocaust crimes. He was later involved with researching the history of the firm and in setting up the memorial site and museum.

=== Site occupation ===
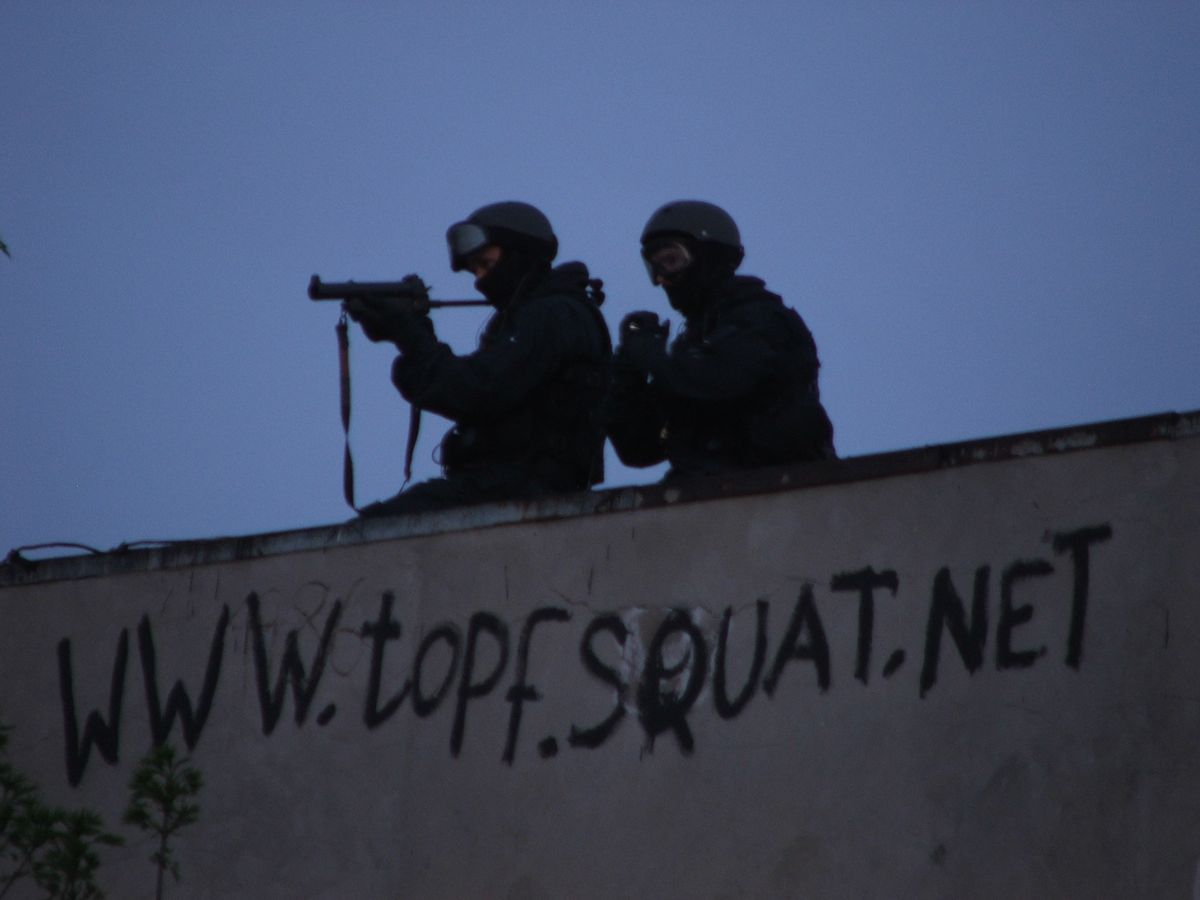
Police during eviction, 16 April 2009

Squatters moved onto part of the site of the former factory on 12 April 2001 and set up an independent culture centre known as Das Besetzte Haus (the occupied house). They ran social and cultural projects, and organised events and guided tours which drew attention to the history of Topf & Söhne during the Nazi period, which had been largely forgotten. The occupation was one of the most well known actions of left-radicals of that period in Germany. A book about the occupation was published in 2012, titled Topf & Söhne – Besetzung auf einem Täterort (Topf & Söhne – Occupation of a crime scene). About 30 remaining squatters were evicted by the police on 16 April 2009.

== Museum and memorial site ==
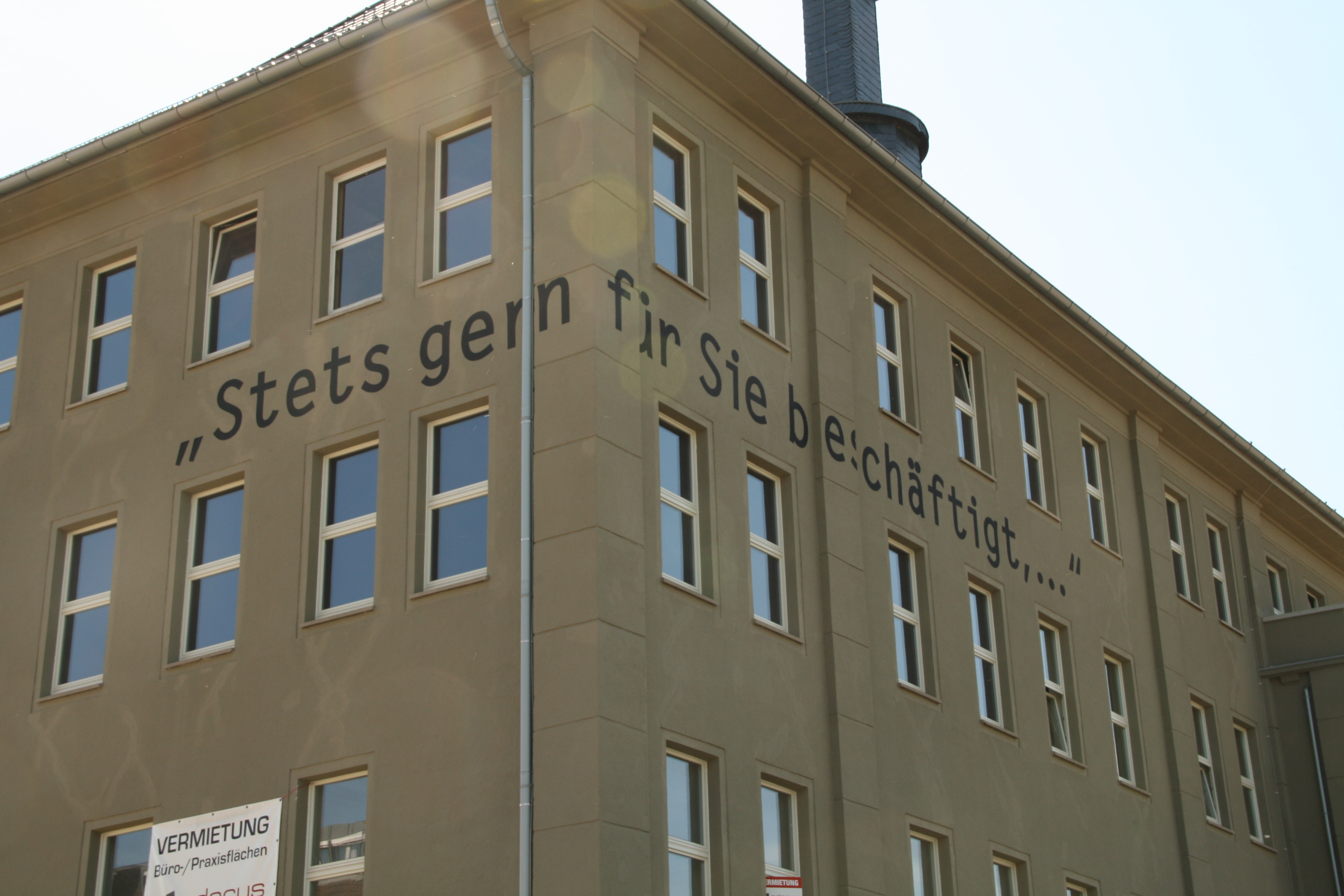
Memorial site Topf & Söhne, Erfurt

After falling into decay for many years, the former Topf & Söhne site was given historic monument protection status by the state of Thuringia in 2003.

The factory workshops no longer remain, but a museum and education centre opened in the former administration building on 27 January 2011, Holocaust Memorial Day. The Topf brothers and the design engineers worked from this building. The site of Buchenwald concentration camp can still be seen in the distance from the window where engineer Kurt Prüfer's desk stood. The state of Thuringia contributed over one million euros to establishing the museum. The museum documents the history of Topf & Söhne and its collaboration with the Nazi regime using material from the company's archives, oral history and items found at the Buchenwald concentration camp site. It also has changing exhibitions, film viewings, talks, etc. on Holocaust related topics.

The motto "Stets gern für Sie beschäftigt, ..." ("Always happy to be at your service, ...") is painted in large letters on the outside of the restored building. This bland valediction (complimentary close) was often used at the end of letters Topf & Söhne sent to the SS, in which details of orders for concentration camp ovens were discussed.

== In film ==
In 2007 the Dutch broadcaster VPRO made a television documentary about Topf & Söhne called The Big Denial as part of the In Europe series. It includes archival footage from the 1930s and 40s, and footage of the ruins of the Topf family villa in 2007 and the Erfurt factory site and administration building before it was restored as a memorial site.

== "Das Besetzte Haus" ==
External videos
- Besetztes Haus Erfurt in Aktion: Widerstand gegen Räumung UNIcut, March 2009 (4:02 min) (in German)
- Die Räumung des Besetzten Hauses in Erfurt am 16.04.2009 (6.24 min) (no commentary)

On 16 April 2009 about 30 remaining squatters who occupied part of the Topf & Söhne site from 2001 to 2009 were evicted by the police. The occupation was known throughout Germany simply as "Das Besetzte Haus" (the occupied house). The University of Erfurt's television channel, UNIcut, made a short report about the occupation shortly before the eviction.

== See also ==
- Degussa
- Forced labour under German rule during World War II
- Nazi war crimes
- Tesch & Stabenow
