= The Queer Art of History =

2023 non-fiction book by Jennifer V. Evans

The Queer Art of History: Queer Kinship After Fascism
- Author: Jennifer V. Evans
- Publisher: Duke University Press
- Publication date: April 2023
- Pages: 312
- ISBN: 978-1-478-02436-1
- OCLC: 1353817641

The Queer Art of History: Queer Kinship After Fascism is a non-fiction book by Jennifer V. Evans. Published in 2023 by Duke University Press, it details the history of the LGBTQ+ movement in post World War II Germany.

== Reception ==
The Queer Art of History was praised by reviewers for questions and challenges they felt it posed to the readers. They also praised the way they felt that Evans looked at history through a non-traditional lens of "queer kinship", in a manner German History described as "tackl[ing] difficult conversations away from a simple act of archival recovery". Journal of the History of Sexuality specifically cited Evans's focus on "queer joy" and "the emancipatory potential of queer imagination" as its strength when compared to other history books dealing with the same topics.

Sébastien Tremblay, in German History, connected The Queer Art of History to other 2023 Germany LGBTQ+ history books written by authors such as Andrea Rottmann, Christopher Ewing, Benno Gammerl, and Teresa Tammer, describing them all as part of a "pivotal turn" which he partially credits to Evans's older work.
