= Jennifer V. Evans =

Canadian historian (born 1970)

Jennifer V. Evans is a professor of history at Carleton University and a competitive athlete. Her research and teaching focuses on the history of sexuality, right-wing populism and authoritarianism, especially in the context of its evolution on social media and visual culture. In 2016, she was elected a member of the College of New Scholars, Royal Society of Canada. Her writing on fascism, authoritarianism, memory, and sexuality has appeared in major newspapers, including The Globe and Mail, The Guardian, the National Post, and the Washington Post.

She was the Canadian Powerlifting Union national champion in bench press for Masters 2, 72 kg women in 2020, and Masters 1, 72 kg women in 2019.

== Career ==
Evans was the first in her family to attend university. She studied Russian and history at McGill University. She completed her MA at Simon Fraser University, and earned her PhD at SUNY-Binghamton (now Binghamton University) in Modern European History under Jean Quataert. Evans was promoted to full professor in 2016. Her writing on homosexuality and queer histories in the aftermath of World War II has focused on understanding the era and evolution of modern civic forms. She frequently explores new ways of doing history, including the use of social theory and artistic interventions. She collaborated with Montreal-born artist Benny Nemerofsky Ramsay on his project "I Don't Know Where Paradise Is" which was exhibited at the Carleton University Art Gallery in the fall of 2020.

== Public engagement ==
Evans is co-creator of the New Fascism Syllabus: Exploring the New Right Through Scholarship and Civic Engagement. In May and June 2021, she curated a series of reflections from scholars, writers, and activists about the role and place of Holocaust memory and colonial violence in contemporary Germany, labelled the Catechism Debate after a series of provocative interventions by human rights historian Dirk Moses in the online Swiss magazine Geschichte der Gegenwart. It has been referred to as the Historian's Debate 2.0 in reference to earlier debates in the 1980s. In the lead up to the US Election in the fall of 2020, Evans led over 200 historians to compose and sign an open letter warning of the dangers posed to democracy in the run-up to the 2020 United States presidential election. Evans is also one of the founding members of the German Studies Collaboratory.

== Fellowships and awards ==
Evans is the principal investigator on the SSHRC supported project Populist Publics which analyzes how populist ideas circulate in social media. Aspects of this research have received funding from the Department of Canadian Heritage, Social Science Research Council, and the Embassy of the Federal Republic of Germany in Ottawa. She has held residential fellowships at the United States Holocaust Memorial Museum in Washington DC, where she was the Grinspoon Fellow. She researched the then under-examined history of gay and lesbian persecution under the Nazis. In May 2018, Evans held an invited professorship at the Fondation de Maison de l'Homme in Paris. In recognition of her lifetime contribution to German History, in 2023 she was awarded the Konrad Adenauer Prize from the Humboldt Foundation. In September 2025, Evans was elected a Fellow of the Royal Society of Canada.

== Service ==
In January 2021, together with Laurie Marhoefer, she ran the Jack and Anita Hess Research Seminar at the United States Holocaust Memorial Museum on LGBTQ+ histories of the Holocaust In November 2022, she and Jan Grabowski of the University of Ottawa are co-hosting the international bi-annual Holocaust conference Lessons and Legacies, sponsored by the Holocaust Education Foundation at Northwestern University.

== Selected publications ==
- Evans, Jennifer V. (2011). Life among the Ruins: Cityscape and Sexuality in Cold War Berlin. Palgrave Macmillan. ISBN 9780230202023. OCLC 711777347.
- Mildenberger, Florian; Evans, Jennifer; Lautmann, Rüdiger; Pastötter, Jakob (2014). Was ist Homosexualität? Forschungsgeschichte, gesellschaftliche Entwicklungen und Perspektiven. Männerschwarm Verlag. ISBN 9783863001759. OCLC 882494007.
- Evans, Jennifer V.; Cook, Matt (2014). Queer Cities, Queer Cultures: Europe Since 1945. Bloomsbury Publishing. ISBN 9781441148407. OCLC 1126630890.
- Evans, Jennifer V.; Betts, Paul; Hoffman, Stefan-Ludwig (2018). The Ethics of Seeing: Photography and Twentieth-Century German History. Berghahn Books. ISBN 9781785337291. OCLC 1008762990.
- Evans, Jennifer V. (2023). The Queer Art of History: Queer Kinship After Fascism. Duke University Press. ISBN 1478019794. OCLC 1353817641.
- Evans, Jennifer V. (2026). Eine queere Art der Geschichte: Queeres Leben in Deutschland nach dem Faschismus. ISBN 978-3-518-30092-3.
- Evans, Jennifer V.; Jonathan Wiesen; Julia Torrie, Eric Kurlander, The Routledge History of Global Nazism, forthcoming from Routledge in 2026
