= Karl Weinbacher =

German businessman and war criminal

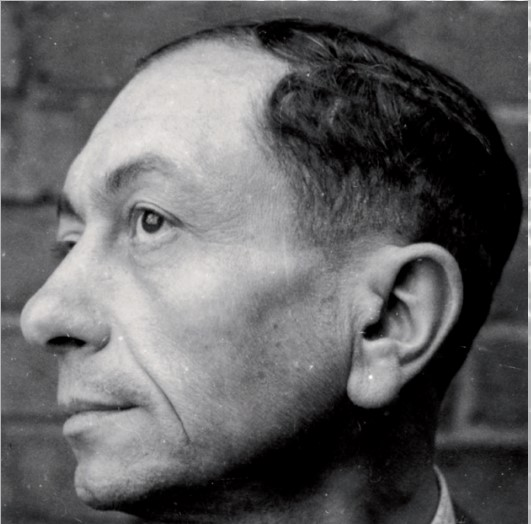
- Weinbacher in British custody (1945)
- Born: 23 June 1898; Stettin, Kingdom of Prussia, German Empire (now Poland)
- Died: 16 May 1946 (aged 47); Hamelin Prison, Allied-occupied Germany
- Occupations: German business manager and war criminal
- Status: Executed by hanging
- Motive: Financial gain
- Conviction: War crimes
- Penalty: Death

Details
- Victims: ~1.1 million (as an accomplice)
- Span of crimes: 1 January 1941 – 31 March 1945
- Country: Germany and Poland
- Locations: Auschwitz concentration camp Sachsenhausen concentration camp Neuengamme concentration camp Majdanek concentration camp Ravensbrück concentration camp
- Weapon: Zyklon B

Karl Weinbacher (23 June 1898 – 16 May 1946) was a German manager and war criminal who was executed after conviction by a British war tribunal following World War II. He and his boss, Bruno Tesch, were the only businessmen to be executed for their roles in Nazi atrocities and the Holocaust in Western Europe.

== Life ==
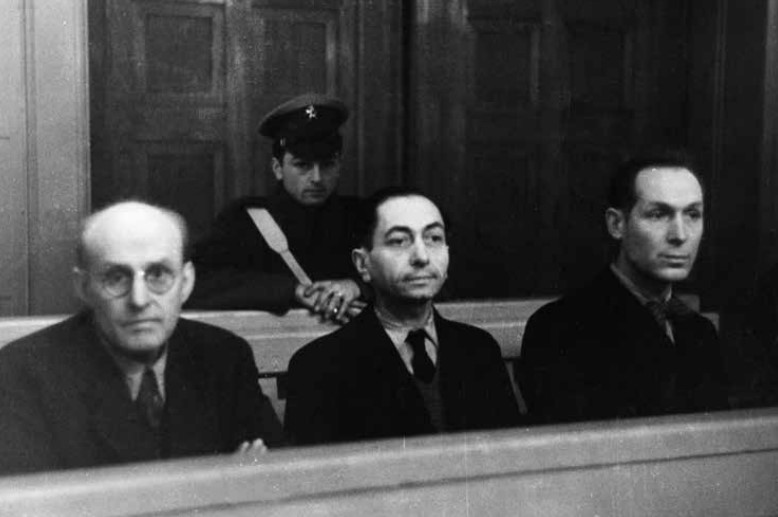
(From left to right) Tesch, Weinbacher, and Drosihn at their trial in March 1946

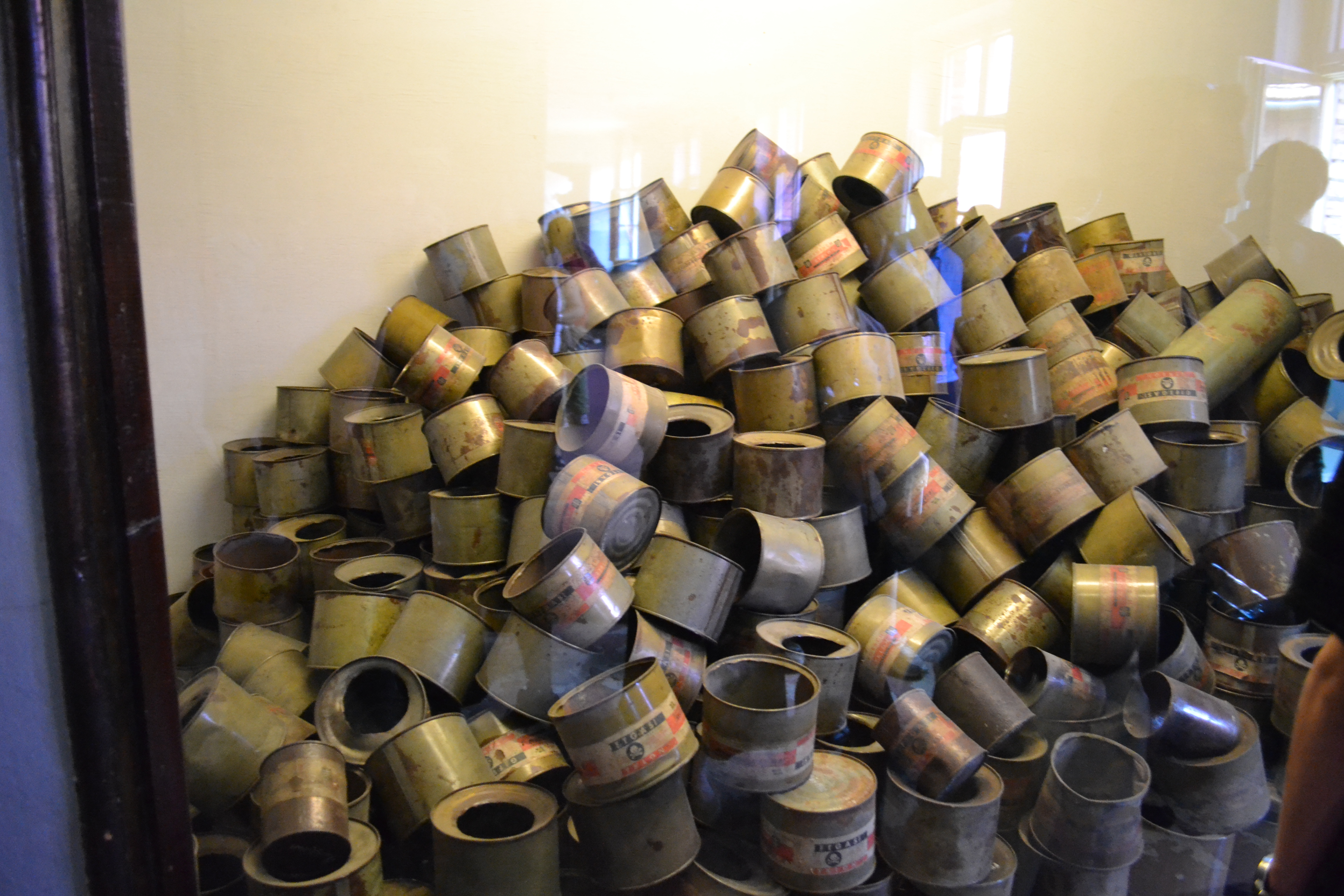
Empty Zyklon B poison gas canisters found by the Red Army at the end of World War II at Auschwitz

Weinbacher worked at Degesch (Deutsche Gesellschaft für Schädlingsbekämpfung, which translates as German Corporation for Pest Control) until 1924, and then at Tesch & Stabenow (Testa, for short), where he received the position of manager in 1927, and by 1943 was director and deputy executive under owner and chief executive officer Bruno Tesch. Testa manufactured and sold Zyklon B, which was used not only for pest control and disinfestation, but also in the Holocaust in the gas chambers of Auschwitz to murder people. Weinbacher received a commission on all of the company's profits, including the Zyklon B sales.

After the end of World War II, Weinbacher, Tesch and Joachim Drosihn, the firm's first gassing technician, were arrested on 3 September 1945. They were tried by a British military tribunal at the Curiohaus trials in Hamburg from 1–8 March 1946, also called the Testa trial or the Zyklon B trial. In the cases of Weinbacher and Tesch, the court ruled that the prosecution had proven that both of them knew how the SS would use Zyklon B. Tesch and Weinbacher were convicted, while Drosihn was acquitted.

In mitigation, the defense for Weinbacher gave similar arguments as Tesch's lawyer. He also said the responsibility should fall on Tesch, and pleaded with the judges to consider Weinbacher's wife and three children. The judges were unsympathetic, and on 8 March 1946, both men were condemned to death by hanging.

Tesch and Weinbacher were executed in Hamelin Prison on 16 May 1946.

== Bibliography ==
- Angelika Ebbinghaus: Der Prozeß gegen Weinbacher und Stabenow - Von der Schädlingsbekämpfung zum Holocaust. In: 1999 - Zeitschrift für Sozialgeschichte des 19. und 20. Jahrhunderts 13 (1998), H. 2, p. 16–71 (pdf)
- Jürgen Kalthoff / Martin Werner: Die Händler des Zyklon B. - Weinbacher & Stabenow. Eine Firmengeschichte zwischen Hamburg und Auschwitz. Hamburg 1998, ISBN 3-87975-713-5.
