= Zyklon B =

Pesticide notorious for its use during the Holocaust

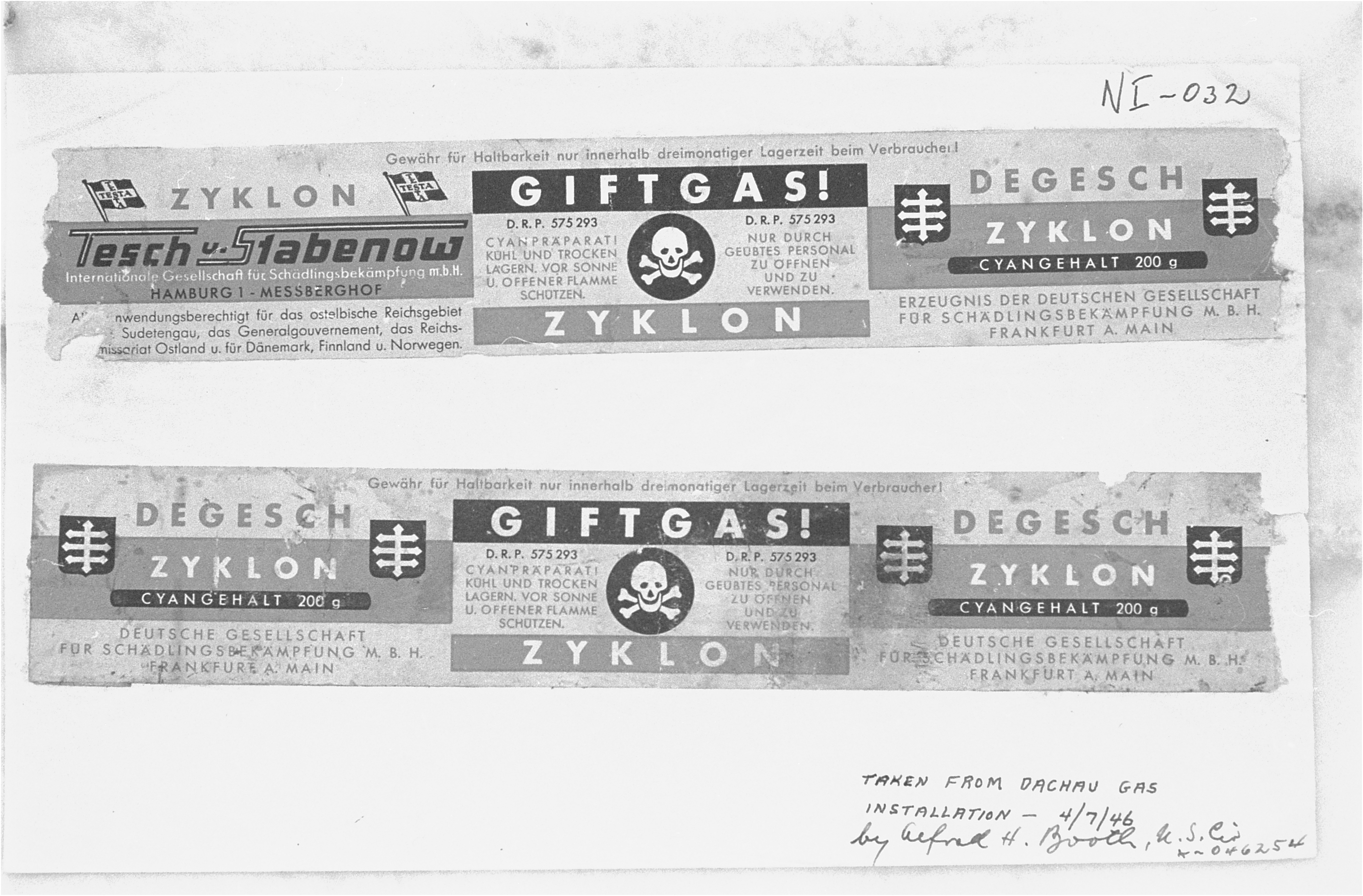
Zyklon labels from Dachau concentration camp used as evidence at the Nuremberg trials; the first and third panels contain manufacturer information and the brand name, the center panel reads "Poison Gas! Cyanide preparation to be opened and used only by trained personnel"

Zyklon B (German: [tsyˈkloːn ˈbeː]; translated Cyclone B) was the trade name of a cyanide-based pesticide invented in Germany in the early 1920s. It consists of hydrogen cyanide (prussic acid), as well as a cautionary eye irritant and one of several adsorbents such as diatomaceous earth. The product is notorious for its use by Nazi Germany during the Holocaust to murder approximately 1.1 million people in gas chambers installed at Auschwitz-Birkenau, Majdanek, and other extermination camps. (Note: A total of around 6 million Jews were murdered during the Holocaust.)

Hydrogen cyanide, a poisonous gas that interferes with cellular respiration, was first used as a pesticide in California in the 1880s. Research at Degesch of Germany led to the development of Zyklon (later known as Zyklon A), a pesticide that released hydrogen cyanide upon exposure to water and heat. It was banned after World War I, because some of its components were used in German chemical weapons. Degussa purchased Degesch in 1922. Their team of chemists, which included Walter Heerdt and Bruno Tesch, devised a method of packaging hydrogen cyanide in sealed canisters along with a cautionary eye irritant and one of several adsorbents such as diatomaceous earth. The new product was also named Zyklon, but it became known as Zyklon B to distinguish it from the earlier version. Uses included delousing clothing and fumigating ships, warehouses, and trains.

The Nazis began using Zyklon B in extermination camps in early 1942 to murder prisoners during the Holocaust. Tesch and his deputy executive, Karl Weinbacher, were executed in 1946 for knowingly selling the product to the SS for use on humans. Hydrogen cyanide is now rarely used as a pesticide but still has industrial applications. Firms in several countries continue to produce Zyklon B under alternative brand names, including Detia-Degesch, the successor to Degesch.

== Mode of action ==
Hydrogen cyanide is a poisonous gas that interferes with cellular respiration. Cyanide poisoning prevents the cell from producing adenosine triphosphate (ATP) by binding to one of the proteins involved in the electron transport chain. This protein, cytochrome c oxidase, contains several subunits and has ligands containing iron groups. The cyanide component of Zyklon B can bind at one of these iron groups, heme a3, forming a more stabilized compound through metal-to-ligand pi bonding. As a result of the formation of this new iron–cyanide complex, the electrons that would situate themselves on the heme a3 group can no longer do so. Instead, these electrons destabilize the compound; thus, the heme group no longer accepts them. Consequently, electron transport is halted, and cells can no longer produce the energy needed to synthesize ATP. Death occurs in a human being weighing 68 kilograms (150 lb) within two minutes of inhaling 70 mg of hydrogen cyanide.

== History ==
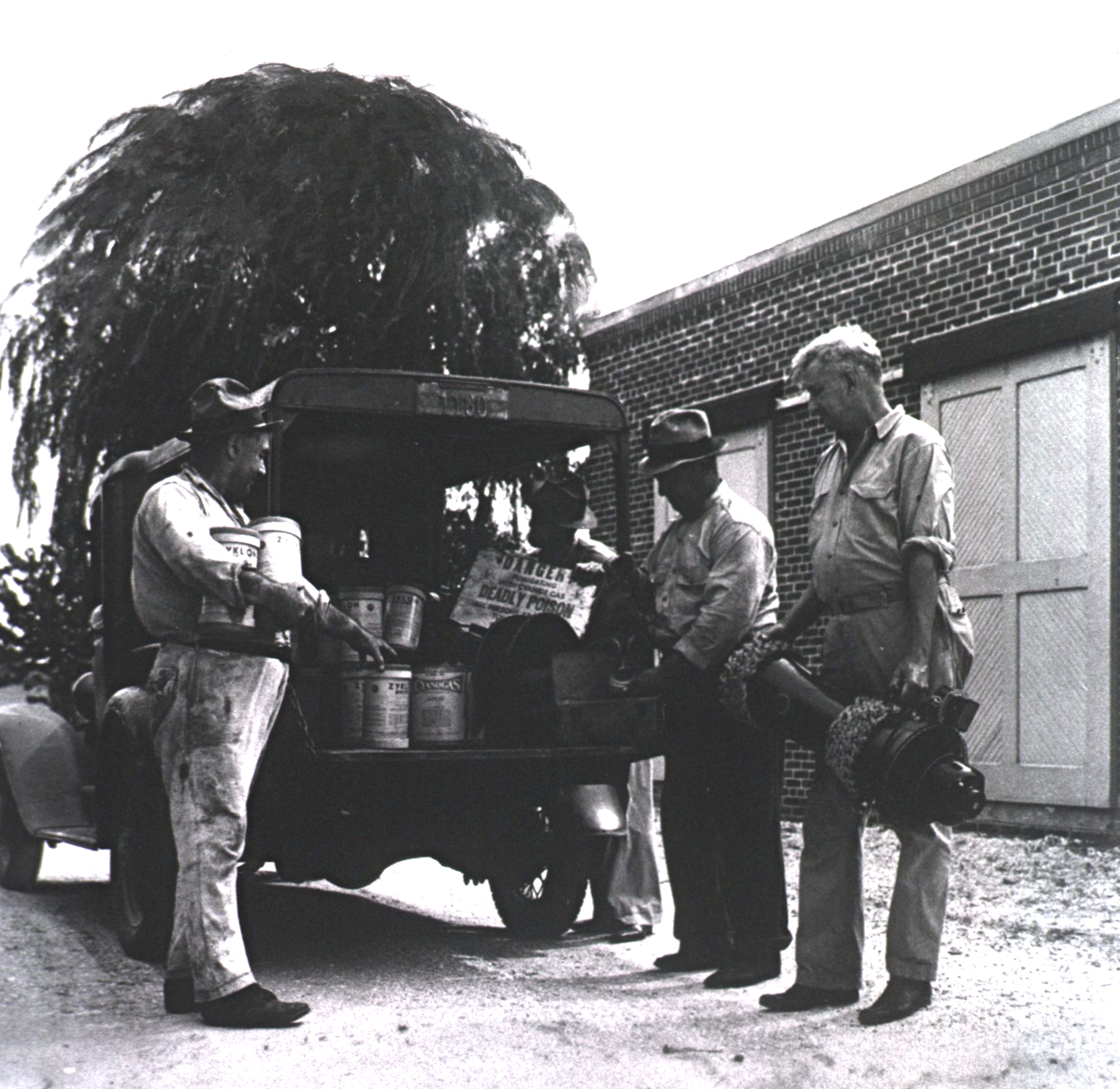
A fumigation team in New Orleans, 1939. Zyklon canisters are visible.

Hydrogen cyanide, discovered in the late 18th century, was used in the 1880s for the fumigation of citrus trees in California. Its use spread to other countries for the fumigation of silos, goods wagons, ships, and mills. Its light weight and rapid dispersal meant its application had to take place under tents or in enclosed areas. Research by Fritz Haber of the Kaiser Wilhelm Institute for Physical Chemistry and Electrochemistry led to the founding in 1919 of Deutsche Gesellschaft für Schädlingsbekämpfung mbH (Degesch), a state-controlled consortium formed to investigate military use of the chemical. Chemists at Degesch added a cautionary eye irritant to a less volatile cyanide compound, which reacted with water in the presence of heat to become hydrogen cyanide. The new product was marketed as the pesticide Zyklon (cyclone). As a similar formula had been used as a weapon during World War I, Zyklon was soon banned.

Deutsche Gold- und Silber-Scheideanstalt (German Gold and Silver Refinery; Degussa) became the sole owner of Degesch in 1922. There, beginning in 1922, Walter Heerdt, Bruno Tesch, and others worked on packaging hydrogen cyanide in sealed canisters along with a cautionary eye irritant (Note: Cautionary eye irritants used included chloropicrin and cyanogen chloride.) and adsorbent stabilizers such as diatomaceous earth. The new product was also labeled as Zyklon, but it became known as Zyklon B to distinguish it from the earlier version. Heerdt was named the inventor of Zyklon B in the Degesch patent application (number DE 438818) dated 20 June 1922. The Deutsches Patent- und Markenamt awarded the patent on 27 December 1926. Beginning in the 1920s, Zyklon B was used at U.S. Customs facilities along the Mexican border to fumigate the clothing of border crossers.

== Corporate structure and marketing ==
In 1930, Degussa ceded 42.5 percent ownership of Degesch to IG Farben and 15 percent to Th. Goldschmidt AG, in exchange for the right to market pesticide products of those two companies through Degesch. Degussa retained managerial control.

While Degesch owned the rights to the brand name Zyklon and the patent on the packaging system, the chemical formula was owned by Degussa. Schlempe GmbH, which was 52 percent owned by Degussa, owned the rights to a process to extract hydrogen cyanide from waste products of sugar beet processing. This process was performed under license by two companies, Dessauer Werke and Kaliwerke Kolin, who also combined the resulting hydrogen cyanide with a stabilizer from IG Farben and a cautionary agent from Schering AG to form the final product, which was packaged using equipment, labels, and canisters provided by Degesch. The finished goods were sent to Degesch, who forwarded the product to two companies that acted as distributors: Heerdt-Linger GmbH (Heli) of Frankfurt and Tesch & Stabenow (Testa) of Hamburg. Their territory was split along the Elbe river, with Heli handling clients to the west and south, and Testa those to the east. Degesch owned 51 percent of the shares of Heli, and until 1942 owned 55 percent of Testa.

Before World War II, Degesch derived most of its Zyklon B profits from overseas sales, particularly in the United States, where it was produced under license by Roessler & Hasslacher before 1931 and by American Cyanamid from 1931 to 1943. From 1929, the United States Public Health Service used Zyklon B to fumigate freight trains and clothes of Mexican immigrants entering the United States. Uses in Germany included delousing clothing (often using a portable sealed chamber invented by Degesch in the 1930s) and fumigating ships, warehouses, and trains. By 1943, sales of Zyklon B accounted for 65 percent of Degesch's sales revenue and 70 percent of its gross profits.

== Use in the Holocaust ==
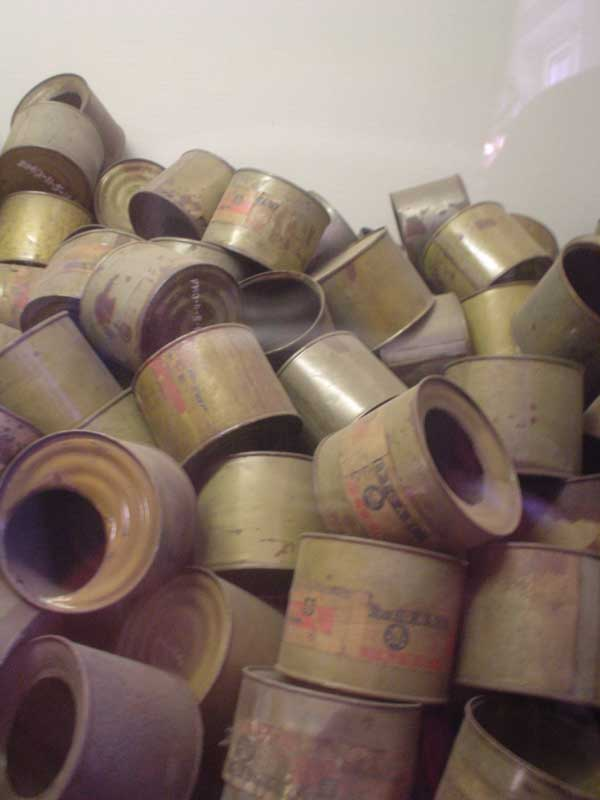
Empty Zyklon B canisters found by the Allies at Auschwitz-Birkenau in 1945

In early 1942, the Nazis began using Zyklon B as the preferred killing tool in extermination camps during the Holocaust. They used it to murder roughly 1.1 million people in gas chambers at Auschwitz-Birkenau, Majdanek, and elsewhere. Zyklon B was preferred because it was assumed to be a "humane" killing method, with the Nazis priding themselves as "civilized killers". Most of the victims were Jews, and by far the majority of murders using this method took place at Auschwitz. (Note: Soviet officials initially stated that over 4 million people were killed using Zyklon B at Auschwitz, but this figure was proven to be greatly exaggerated.) Distributor Heli supplied Zyklon B to Mauthausen, Dachau, and Buchenwald, and Testa supplied it to Auschwitz and Majdanek; camps also occasionally bought it directly from the manufacturers. Some 56 tonnes of the 729 tonnes sold in Germany in 1942–44 were sold to concentration camps, amounting to about 8 percent of domestic sales. Auschwitz received 23.8 tonnes, of which 6 tonnes were used for fumigation. The remainder was used in the gas chambers or lost to spoilage (the product had a stated shelf life of only three months). Testa conducted fumigations for the Wehrmacht and supplied them with Zyklon B. They also offered courses to the SS in the safe handling and use of the material for fumigation purposes. In April 1941, the German agriculture and interior ministries designated the SS as an authorized applier of the chemical, which meant they were able to use it without any further training or governmental oversight.

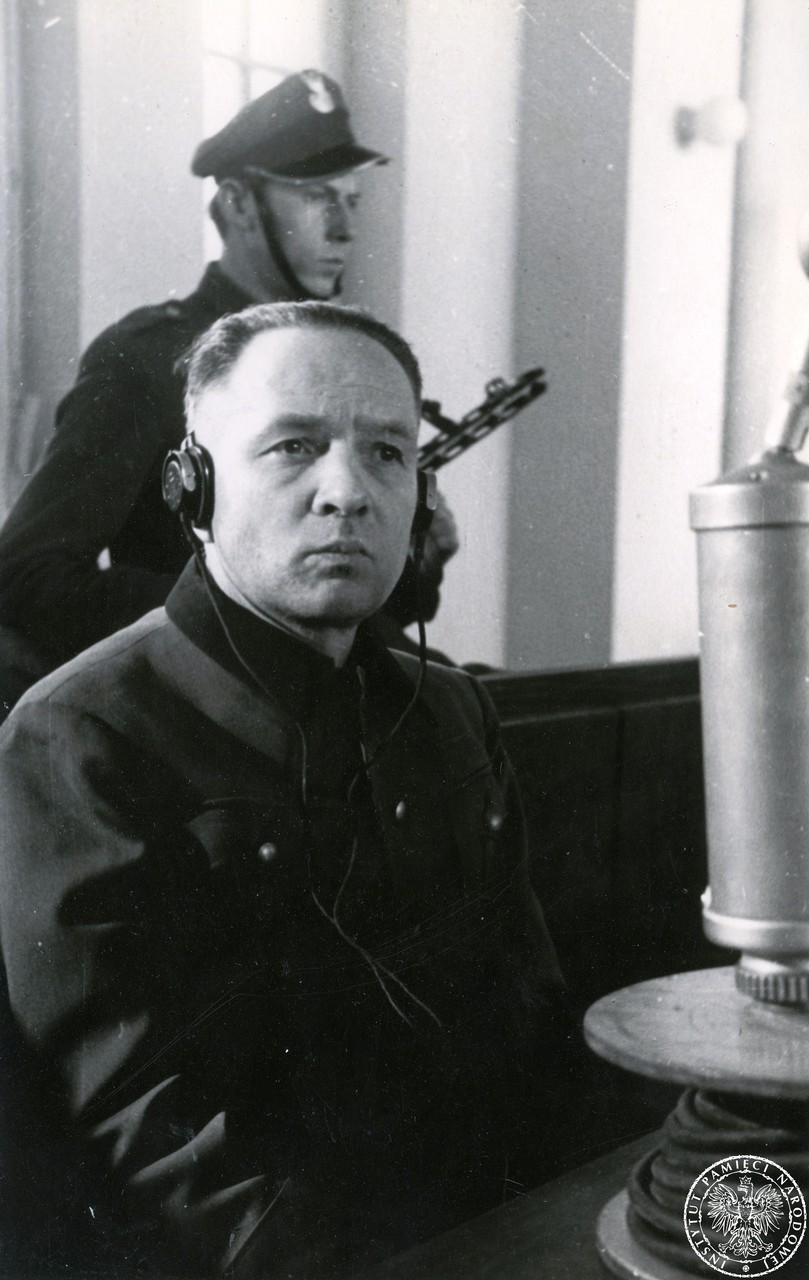
Rudolf Höss at his trial in Poland, 1947

Rudolf Höss, commandant of Auschwitz, said that the use of Zyklon-B to murder prisoners came about on the initiative of one of his subordinates, SS-Hauptsturmführer (captain) Karl Fritzsch, who had used it to murder some Russian POWs in late August 1941 in the basement of Block 11 in the main camp. They repeated the experiment on more Russian POWs in September, with Höss watching. Block 11 proved unsuitable, as the basement was difficult to air out afterwards and the crematorium (Crematorium I, which operated until July 1942) was some distance away. The site of the murders was moved to Crematorium I, where more than 700 victims could be murdered at once. By the middle of 1942, the operation was moved to Auschwitz II–Birkenau, a nearby satellite camp that had been under construction since October 1941.

The first gas chamber at Auschwitz II–Birkenau was the "red house" (called Bunker 1 by SS staff), a brick cottage converted to a gassing facility by tearing out the inside and bricking up the windows. It was operational by March 1942. A second brick cottage, called the "white house" or Bunker 2, was converted some weeks later. According to Höss, Bunker 1 held 800 victims and Bunker 2 held 1,200 victims. These structures were in use for mass murder until early 1943. At that point, the Nazis decided to greatly increase the gassing capacity of Birkenau. Crematorium II was originally designed as a mortuary with morgues in the basement and ground-level incinerators; they converted it into a killing factory by installing gas-tight doors, vents for the Zyklon B to be dropped into the chamber, and ventilation equipment to remove the gas afterwards. (Note: The gas chamber also had to be heated, as the Zyklon B pellets would not vaporize into hydrogen cyanide unless the temperature was 27 °C (81 °F) or above.) Crematorium III was built using the same design. Crematoria IV and V, designed from the beginning as gas chambers, were also constructed that spring. By June 1943, all four crematoria were operational. Most of the victims were murdered using these four structures.

The Nazis began shipping large numbers of Jews from all over Europe to Auschwitz in the middle of 1942. Those who were not selected for work crews were immediately gassed. Those selected to die generally comprised about three-quarters of the total and included almost all children, women with small children, all the elderly, and all those who appeared on brief and superficial inspection by an SS doctor not to be completely fit. The victims were told that they were to undergo delousing and a shower. They were stripped of their belongings and herded into the gas chamber.

A special SS bureau known as the Hygienic Institute delivered the Zyklon B to the crematoria by ambulance. The actual delivery of the gas to the victims was always handled by the SS, on the order of the supervising SS doctor. After the doors were shut, SS men dropped Zyklon B pellets through vents in the roof or holes in the side of the chamber. The victims were dead within 20 minutes. Johann Kremer, an SS doctor who oversaw gassings, testified that the "shouting and screaming of the victims could be heard through the opening and it was clear that they fought for their lives".

Sonderkommandos (special work crews forced to work at the gas chambers) wearing gas masks then dragged the bodies from the chamber. The victims' glasses, artificial limbs, jewelry, and hair were removed, and any dental work was extracted so the gold could be melted down. If the gas chamber was crowded, which they typically were, the corpses were found half-squatting, their skin discolored pink with red and green spots, with some foaming at the mouth or bleeding from their ears. The corpses were burned in the nearby incinerators, and the ashes were buried, thrown in the river, or used as fertilizer. With the Soviet Red Army approaching through Poland, the last mass gassing at Auschwitz took place on 30 October 1944. In November 1944, Reichsführer-SS Heinrich Himmler, head of the SS, ordered gassing operations to cease throughout Nazi Germany.

== Legacy ==
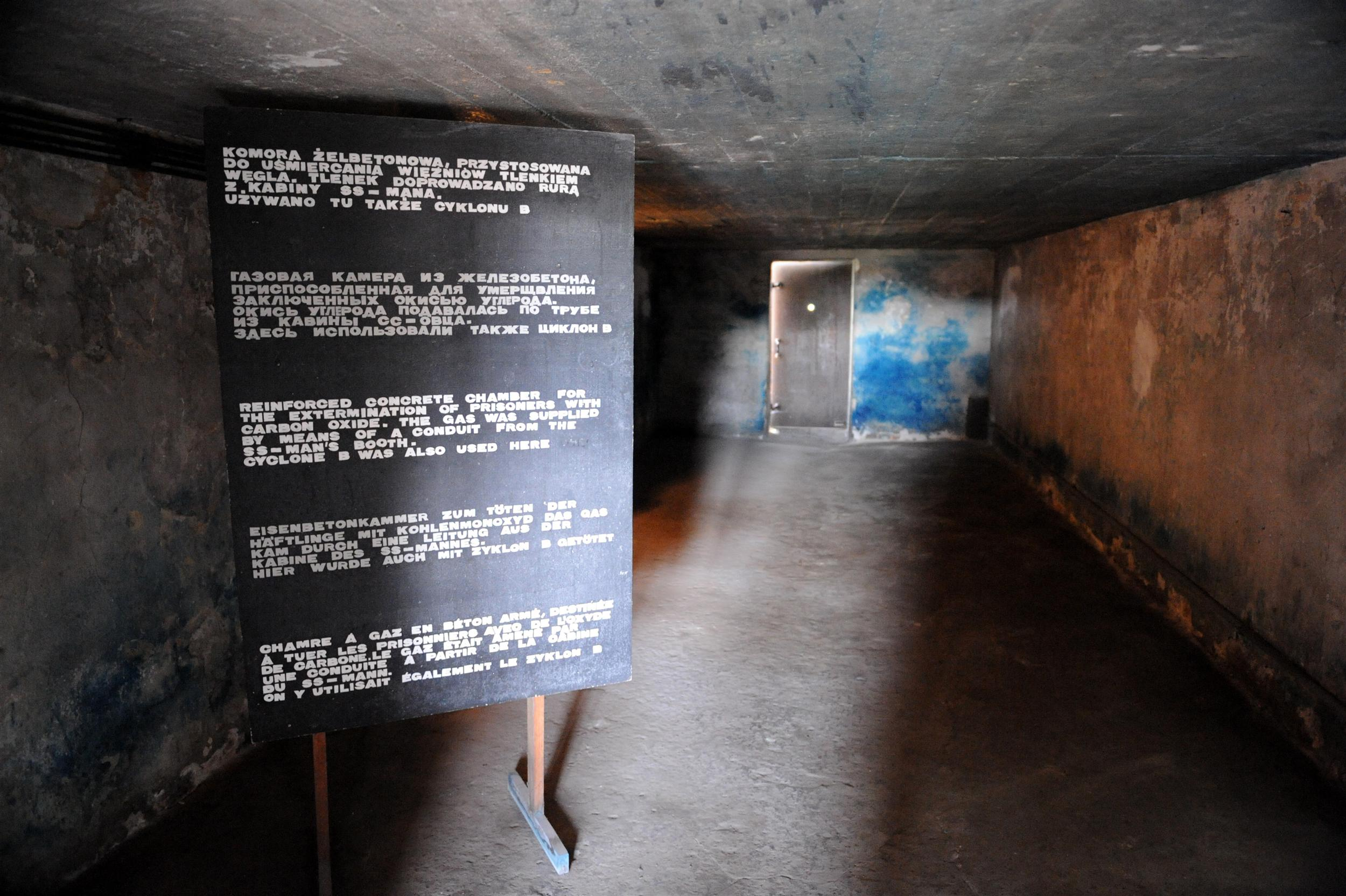
Interior of Majdanek gas chamber, showing Prussian blue residue

After World War II ended in 1945, Bruno Tesch and Karl Weinbacher of Tesch & Stabenow were tried in a British military court and executed for knowingly providing Zyklon B to the SS for use on humans. Gerhard Peters, who served as principal operating officer of Degesch and Heli and also held posts in the Nazi government, served two years and eight months in prison as an accessory before being released due to amendments to the penal code.

Use of hydrogen cyanide as a pesticide or cleaner has been banned or restricted in some countries. Most hydrogen cyanide is used in industrial processes, made by companies in Germany, Japan, the Netherlands, and the US. Degesch resumed production of Zyklon B after the war. It was still produced as of 2008. Degussa sold Degesch to Detia-Freyberg GmbH in 1986. The company is now called Detia-Degesch. Degussa and one of its subsidiaries controversially supplied materials for Berlin's Memorial to the Murdered Jews of Europe, which was completed in 2004. Up until around 2015, a fumigation product similar to Zyklon B was in production by Lučební závody Draslovka of the Czech Republic, under the trade name Uragan D2. Uragan means "hurricane" or "cyclone" in Czech.

Subsequent use of the word "Zyklon" in trade names has prompted angry reactions in English-speaking countries. The name "Zyklon" on portable roller coasters made since 1965 by Pinfari provoked protests among Jewish groups in the U.S. in 1993 and 1999. In 2002, British sportswear and football equipment supplier Umbro issued an apology and stopped using the name "Zyklon", which had appeared since 1999 on the box for one of its trainers, after receiving complaints from the Simon Wiesenthal Center and the Beth Shalom Holocaust Centre. Also in 2002, Siemens withdrew its application for an American trademark of the word "Zyklon", which their subsidiary BSH Bosch und Siemens Hausgeräte had proposed to use for a new line of home appliances in the United States. (The firm was already using the name in Germany for one of their vacuum cleaners.) Protests were lodged by the Simon Wiesenthal Center after the trademark application was reported to BBC News Online by one of their readers. French company IPC's product names used "Cyclone" for degreasers and suffix "B" for biodegradable: "Cyclone B" was renamed "Cyclone Cap Vert" ("green cap") in 2013 after protests from Jewish groups. A rabbi said the name was "horrible ignorance at best, and a Guinness record in evil and cynicism if the company did know the history of the name of its product."

Holocaust deniers claim that Zyklon B gas was not used in the gas chambers, relying for evidence on the discredited research of Fred A. Leuchter, who found low levels of Prussian blue in samples of the gas chamber walls and ceilings. Leuchter attributed its presence to the general delousing of the buildings. Leuchter's negative control, a sample of gasket material taken from a different camp building, had no cyanide residue. In 1999, James Roth, the chemist who had analyzed Leuchter's samples, stated that the test was flawed because the material that was sent for testing included large chunks, and the chemical would only be within 10 microns of the surface. The surface that had been exposed to the chemical was not identified, and the large size of the specimens meant that any chemical present was diluted by an undeterminable amount. In 1994, the Institute for Forensic Research in Kraków re-examined Leuchter's claim, stating that formation of Prussian blue by exposure of bricks to cyanide is not a highly probable reaction. Using microdiffusion techniques, they tested 22 samples from the gas chambers and delousing chambers (as positive controls) and living quarters (as negative controls). They found cyanide residue in both the delousing chambers and the gas chambers, but none in the living quarters.

== See also ==
- Carbon monoxide poisoning
- Kurt Gerstein
- Methyl cyanoformate
