= Degesch =

German chemical corporation

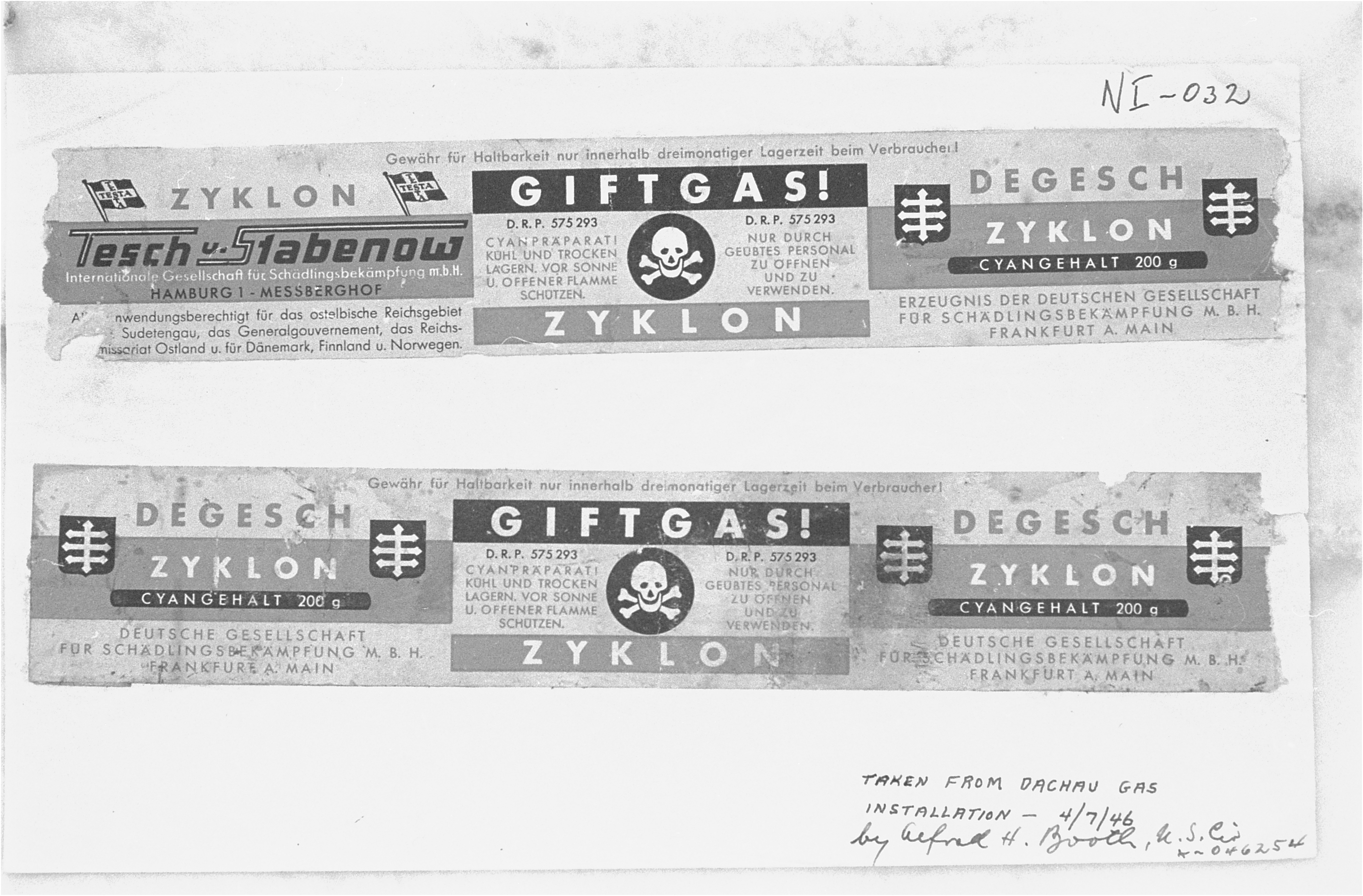
Zyklon labels from Dachau concentration camp used as evidence at the Nuremberg trials. The first and third panels contain manufacturer information and the brand name. Zyklon was used at Dachau for fumigation purposes.

The Deutsche Gesellschaft für Schädlingsbekämpfung mbH (transl. German Corporation for Pest Control) was a German chemical corporation which manufactured pesticides. Degesch held the patent on the infamous pesticide Zyklon, a variant of which was used to execute people in the gas chambers of German extermination camps during the Holocaust. Through the firms Tesch & Stabenow GmbH (Testa) and Heerdt-Linger (Heli), Degesch sold the poisonous gas Zyklon B to the German Army and the Schutzstaffel (SS).

Degesch was founded in 1919 as a subsidiary of Degussa. Its first director was Nobel laureate Fritz Haber. In 1936, Degussa and IG Farben each held 42.5% of the shares, while Th. Goldschmidt AG held the remaining 15%. During the years 1938 through 1943, Degesch was extremely profitable. For most of these years, IG Farben received dividends amounting to twice the value of their shares. After the Second World War Degesch continued production. In 1986, the company was sold to Detia Freyberg GmbH; the current name is Detia-Degesch GmbH.

== Prosecution ==
During the IG Farben trial the director of Degesch, Gerhard Friedrich Peters, implicated himself. He received information by Kurt Gerstein about the murder of people using Zyklon and was informed that the German army needed the gas without the usual additives that were added to warn people by smell of its poisonous nature (the Zyklon B variant). In 1949, Peters was charged with murder in the court of Frankfurt and convicted and sentenced to five years imprisonment. The conviction was in 1952, legally confirmed in an appeal and set to six years. Peters went to prison but was acquitted in a new appeal in 1953. The law had changed; he was no longer considered guilty in assisting in murder. The chairman of the board of directors from 1939 to 1945, Hermann Schlosser, was arrested in February 1948, and acquitted in April 1948; later he took another job as chairman of the board.

The owner of Tesch & Stabenow, Bruno Tesch, and its director Karl Weinbacher were convicted and sentenced to death by a British tribunal and executed in Hamelin Prison on 16 May 1946. An employee Joachim Drosihn was acquitted.

In 1979, Testa, which was newly founded after the war, merged with Heerdt-Lingler GmbH (HeLi) with the financial participation of Degesch.

== See also ==
- German re-armament
