= Bruno Tesch =

German chemist and war criminal (1890–1946)

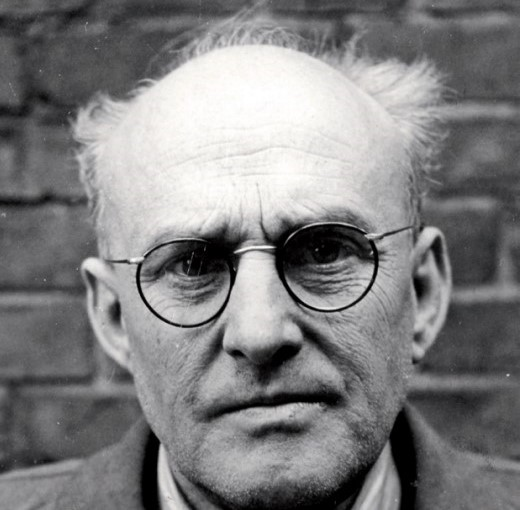
- Tesch in British custody, 1945
- Born: Bruno Emil Tesch; 14 August 1890; Berlin, German Empire
- Died: 16 May 1946 (aged 55); Hamelin Prison, Hamelin, Allied-occupied Germany
- Cause of death: Execution by hanging
- Occupations: Chemist and entrepreneur
- Known for: Co-inventor of Zyklon B
- Political party: Nazi Party
- Status: Executed
- Motive: Financial gain
- Conviction: War crimes
- Penalty: Death

Details
- Victims: ~1.1 million (as an accomplice)
- Span of crimes: 1 January 1941 – 31 March 1945
- Country: Germany and Poland
- Locations: Auschwitz concentration camp Sachsenhausen concentration camp Neuengamme concentration camp Majdanek concentration camp Ravensbrück concentration camp
- Weapon: Zyklon B

Bruno Emil Tesch (14 August 1890 – 16 May 1946) was a German chemist, entrepreneur, and convicted war criminal. Together with Gerhard Peters and Walter Heerdt, he invented the insecticide Zyklon B. He was the owner of Tesch & Stabenow (called Testa), a pest control company he co-founded in 1924 with Paul Stabenow in Hamburg, Germany. During the Holocaust, Tesch sold vast quantities of Zyklon B, utilising his pesticide as a way to commit genocide. Over 1.1 million people (mainly Jews) were murdered by the Nazis using Zyklon B. A former employee of Tesch later said he was motivated not by ideology, but financial gain.

Following the end of World War II, he was arrested by British occupation authorities, tried as a war criminal, and executed. Tesch and his deputy executive, Karl Weinbacher, were the only businessmen to be executed for their role in Nazi war crimes in Western Europe.

== Early life and education ==
After passing his high school exams in 1910, Tesch studied mathematics and physics for a semester in 1910 at the University of Göttingen before studying chemistry at the University of Berlin. He received his doctorate in 1914 and volunteered for military service at the start of the First World War. After a war injury, Tesch was appointed by Fritz Haber to the Kaiser Wilhelm Institute for Physical Chemistry and Electrochemistry to develop "chemical weapons of war". After the war, he stayed there as Haber's personal assistant until March 1920. Tesch then took over the management of the Berlin branch of the German Society for Pest Control (Degesch) GmbH. Tesch joined the Nazi Party on 1 May 1933, albeit not as an active member. He became a supporting member of the SS the same year. When Emil Sehm, a former employee of Tesch who became an important witness at his trial, was asked to give his opinion about him, he said Tesch was not motivated by ideology.

"Dr. Tesch was solely a business man and, according to my opinion, he was a very unscrupulous business man, a business man who would be prepared to walk over dead bodies; that is my opinion."

== Zyklon B ==
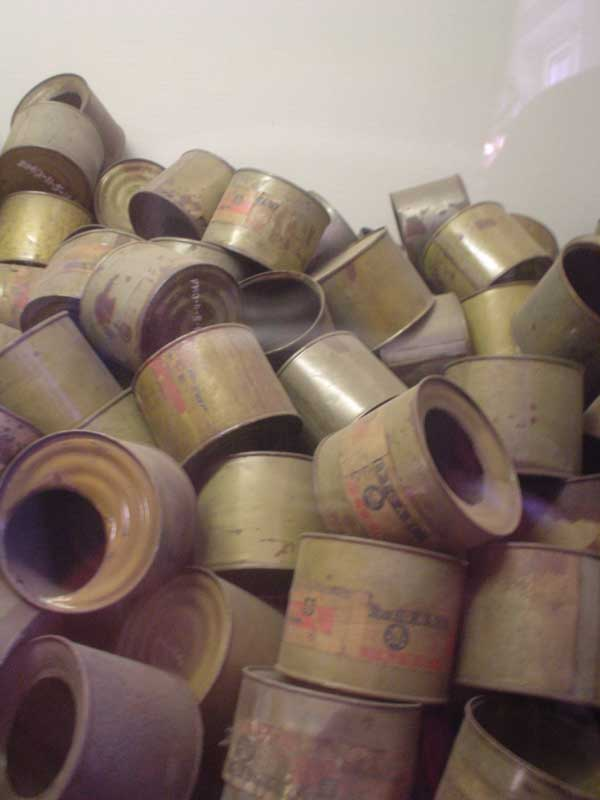
Empty poison gas canisters, of Zyklon B, found by the Russians at the end of World War II in Auschwitz

Tesch, along with fellow chemists Gerhard Peters and Walter Heerdt, with the support of I.G. Farben, began research into the use of hydrogen cyanide as a fumigating agent. They developed a process in which the hydrogen cyanide could be manufactured and used in a solid form.

The patent was assigned to Degesch, "Deutsche Gesellschaft für Schädlingsbekämpfung mbH" (German Limited Company for Pest Control), a subsidiary of I.G. Farben, with Walter Heerdt being the only one of the inventors to receive patent rights, a portion of the proceeds from the manufacture and sale. Peters joined Degesch and became managing director during World War II. Degesch was designated by the German government to set the safety rules and standards for the use of Zyklon B, and was given the authority to authorise shipments from the manufacturer to the customer after the strict criteria were met.

Tesch & Stabenow manufactured neither Zyklon B nor any other chemicals. It was primarily a pest control company specialising in fumigation of commercial properties such as the warehouses and freighters in the Port of Hamburg. Zyklon B was produced by Dessauer Werke and Kaliwerke.

In 1925, Tesch & Stabenow—partly due to the largesse of Paul Haber of Degesch—received the exclusive rights to distribute the insecticide Zyklon B east of the Elbe River. In 1927, Stabenow departed from the firm. Tesch held a 45% share of the company, and Degesch held 55%. Tesch assumed sole ownership of the company in 1942.

During World War II, Tesch & Stabenow sold massive quantities of Zyklon B to the SS. The gas was sent to Auschwitz, Sachsenhausen, Neuengamme, Gross-Rosen, Majdanek, and Ravensbrück concentration camps. In these camps, the SS used the Zyklon B they had purchased to murder approximately 1.1 million people.

== Arrest and investigation ==
An investigation into Tesch started after a former Testa bookkeeper, Emil Sehm, wrote to British military authorities, who were present in Hamburg since the city was in the British military government's zone of Allied-occupied Germany. Sehm said that in 1942, he had come across one of Tesch's travel reports. In it, Tesch had recorded an interview with leading members of the Wehrmacht, during which he was told that the burial, after shooting, of Jews in increasing numbers was proving increasingly unhygienic, and that it was proposed to kill them with prussic acid. Allegedly, when Tesch was asked for his views, he had proposed to use the same method, involving the release of prussic acid gas in an enclosed space, as was to exterminate vermin. He had then trained the SS to use Zyklon B to kill human beings.

Sehm said he copied this report and showed it to a close friend, Wilhelm Pook. Pook advised Sehm to destroy the letter immediately since keeping the letter posed a safety risk. Sehm destroyed the letter. He was fired for unknown reasons after the firm's building suffered an air raid in July 1943.

Tesch was detained in September 1945. British officers Walter Freud and Fred Pelican were assigned to the case. The day after Tesch's arrest, Sehm accompanied the British to the firm building, only to find that registry had seemingly been destroyed in an air raid (it was later suspected that the registry had been intentionally destroyed).

During questioning, Tesch presented himself as a respectable businessman and chemist. He denied all suggestions and accusations that he had collaborated with the SS regarding the extermination of Jews. He said he never attended a conference discussing the subject, had not devised any methods for using Zyklon B other than fumigating the barracks, and had not known that the gas was being used to kill people. Tesch said he did not even know the gas was being sent to concentration camps.

Tesch admitted to being a member of the Nazi Party and a "supporting member of the SS". He explained that he had been affiliated with the SS Hygiene Institute to obtain their business. Freud did not believe Tesch, but had no evidence beyond Sehm's word. At the same time, Freud was facing pressure from high command to release Tesch, since British occupation forces were using Zyklon B to fumigate their ships. Against the wishes of Freud and Pelican, Tesch was released on 1 October 1945.

Both men immediately started lobbying their superiors to let them continue their investigation. Freud, who was a chemist himself, was adamant that the investigation be allowed to continue. He and Pelican told high command that Tesch's case was the first time they were dealing "not with people directly concerned in the murder or ill-treatment of prisoners or slave workers, but with those who lent their skill and services to facilitating the gruesome work of the concentration camps and so identified themselves with breaches of the laws of war on a wholesale scale." Their superiors relented, and Tesch was re-arrested on 6 October 1945. Freud and Pelican started searching through other files, and found that the firm had a sharp rise in profits in 1942 and 1943, when the mass gassings were at their peak. However, they could not find anything suggesting that Tesch or his employees knew their product was being used to kill people. Raids of the firm's employees turned up nothing.

During further questioning, Freud reported that Tesch adopted an attitude of ignorance carried "to an absurdity." The questioning of Tesch's deputy executive, Karl Weinbacher, also failed to get any answers. Freud reported that Weinbacher was "blindly obedient, has a slow brain", and was "an arrogant man with limited intellect." Freud said Weinbacher "was so insolent that special steps had to be taken by the interrogating officer."

The British administration was soon insisting that the firm needed to resume its fumigating. The firm's accountant, Alfred Zaun, was asked to substitute for Tesch. He agreed, but said he needed written authorisation from Tesch. Freud and Pelican, becoming desperate, organised a meeting with hidden microphones, hoping that Tesch might incriminate himself. However, he and Zaun whispered to each other quietly enough that the microphones did not pick up anything.

After the meeting, Zaun was interrogated. Officials told him the room was bugged and bluffed that they had overheard everything. Zaun panicked and admitted that the firm had sold Zyklon B to concentration camps. He said he had records to prove the sales, but claimed he did not know their purpose. While searching through the new documents, Freud came across some other documents discussing a "training course" delivered by Tesch to SS personnel at Sachsenhausen in January 1941. The names of several SS men were listed. All of them were low-ranking.

One name drew Pelican's attention: Wilhelm Bahr. Bahr, a medical officer, had earlier been identified by a survivor of the Neuengamme concentration camp as having participated in the murders of hundreds of prisoners. After the war, Bahr had gone into hiding in the cellar of a home near the Neuengamme camp. His plan was to wait until the British had occupied the town, wait a few more weeks, then leave the cellar and return to his old life. However, Bahr was caught after someone noticed him scavenging for food and alerted British authorities. In May 1946, a British military court found him guilty of war crimes and sentenced him to death for actively participating in mass murder. Bahr was executed in October 1946.

At this point in time, however, Bahr was still alive and in custody. When British officials asked Bahr to talk about what he did in Neuengamme, he immediately confessed. At the camp hospital, Bahr said he had murdered Jews and other "subhumans" using phenol injections. Those deemed unfit for work were injected with the deadly mixture. Bahr insisted to a horrified Pelican that the victims were killed "painlessly and humanely", and had all died within minutes. He said he had killed 90 to 100 inmates this way on a daily basis in Neuengamme, and that overall, he had likely killed over 1000 people.

In 1942, Bahr said he was given a training course on the use of Zyklon B by Tesch. He was certified and shown how to use Zyklon B for delousing. Bahr said he usually just used the gas for its original purpose, disinfection. However, on one occasion, he had been ordered to empty tins of Zyklon B into a sealed barracks filled with approximately 200 Soviet POWs. Bahr said that Tesch had not taught him the procedure he employed to use Zyklon B on people.

Although the evidence against Tesch was circumstantial, Freud was unwilling to drop the case. Tesch, Weinbacher and Joachim Drosihn, the firm's first gassing technician, were indicted for war crimes. The charge was that the defendants, "between 1st January, 1941, and 31st March, 1945, in violation of the laws and usages of war did supply poison gas used for the extermination of Allied nationals interned in concentration camps, well knowing that the said gas was to be so used."

== Trial and execution ==
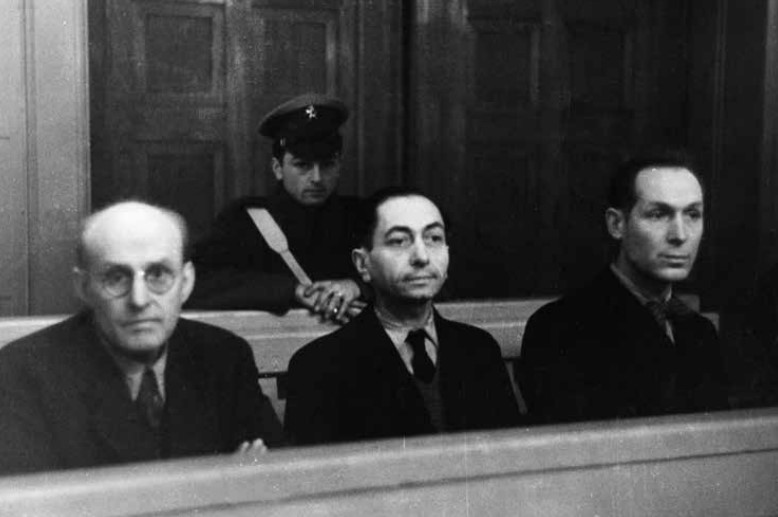
Tesch (left) sitting next to Karl Weinbacher (centre) and Joachim Drosihn (right) at their trial in March 1946

In March 1946, Tesch was tried jointly with Weinbacher and Drosihn. The prosecutor was British Army Major Gerald Draper, who argued that Tesch knew the SS was using Zyklon B to systemically exterminate human beings, and had chosen to continue selling massive quantities of the gas to them. Draper's first witness was Emil Sehm, who discussed the report he had found.

Draper presented several other witnesses who also backed the existence of the report:

- Erna Biagini, a former secretary of the firm who had been in charge of the registry, claimed to have read, in "approximately 1942", a travel report from Tesch which stated that Zyklon B could be used for killing human beings as well as vermin.
- Anna Uenzelmann, another secretary, said that in June 1942, after dictating a travel report on returning from Berlin, a seemingly horrified Tesch told her that Zyklon B was being used to gas people.

Karl Ruehmling, who had been a bookkeeper and assistant gassing master for the firm, said that Zyklon B was sent by Tesch to Auschwitz, Sachsenhausen, and Neuengamme. Auschwitz received the largest amount of gas. According to another witness, Drosihn had once visited the camps. Afterwards, he reported to Tesch. Drosihn told his boss that he saw things "unworthy of human dignity". However, the Zyklon B sales continued. Draper presented an affidavit from a high-ranking German government official showing that in 1943, it was common knowledge in Germany that gas was being used to kill people, albeit Zyklon B was not the only gas being used.

Draper described Weinbacher as Tesch's second-in-command. Weinbacher had acted as a substitute director for the firm whenever Tesch was out on business trips. Draper said that if Tesch was guilty, so was Weinbacher. Tesch and Weinbacher both claimed ignorance. They claimed they thought the Zyklon B was only going to be used for its intended purpose. Weinbacher said he knew nothing about Tesch's business travels. Tesch's lawyer conceded that the amounts of Zyklon B sold to the SS were large. However, he said, "it was the duty of the SS to see that the state of health in the eastern provinces was kept at a high level". On the stand, Tesch said Eastern Europe had a serious vermin infestation, which was true.

Draper focused the least on Drosihn, as his case was far more complicated. Drosihn had a subordinate role in the firm, and his job was technical and did not involve bookkeeping or sales. With the backing of witnesses, Drosihn said he had nothing to do with the company's business dealings. His lawyer pointed to his smaller salary as evidence of his lack of authority. He was in no position to read Tesch's travel reports. In closing, Draper said that Drosihn must have known something about what Tesch and Weinbacher were doing, even if his job did not involve sales.

As for Tesch, Draper said he knew exactly what he was doing when he sold Zyklon B to the SS. He said there was no way that Tesch could not have known what was happening in the camps, or how much gas was being sold. Draper said Tesch's actions and knowledge made him an accomplice to murder, and that Weinbacher was just as guilty. Draper conceded his lack of direct evidence. However, he then said "the real strength" of his case was not the direct evidence, but the firm itself.

The Judge Advocate summarised what Draper had meant. He said Tesch and Weinbacher appeared to know everything about their business, but were sensitive to talk about the Zyklon B sales to Auschwitz. The Judge Advocate said Draper was asking, "Why is it that these competent businessmen are so sensitive about these particular deliveries? Is it because they themselves knew that such large deliveries could not possibly be going there for the purpose of delousing clothing or for the purpose of disinfecting buildings?"

In Weinbacher's case, the Judge Advocate said there was no direct evidence. However, he then asked the judges what the odds were that Weinbacher had only paid attention to the figures related to other dealings, and never to those concerning the Zyklon B sales, the firm's most profitable business venture. He also noted that as the deputy executive of Testa, Weinbacher got a commission on all of the firm's profits. During his summation, the Judge Advocate implied that Drosihn was not morally innocent. However, he said Drosihn was in no position to either influence the sales of Zyklon B to Auschwitz, let alone prevent them. He concluded that regardless of how much Drosihn knew, he could not legally be found guilty without having been in a position to influence the sales.

The trial ended on 8 March 1946, Tesch and Weinbacher were both found guilty. Drosihn was acquitted and released.

In mitigation, the defence for Tesch and Weinbacher claimed that Tesch did not know how the gas was being used, and if he did, he only sold it under immense pressure from the SS. Even if Tesch had not cooperated, he said, the SS would have achieved their goals by other means. In conclusion, he said that Tesch was, at worst, an important accessory before the fact. Weinbacher's lawyer gave similar arguments. He also said the responsibility should fall on Tesch, and pleaded with the judges to consider Weinbacher's wife and three children.

Following deliberations, Tesch and Weinbacher were sentenced to death by hanging. They were executed on 16 May 1946, by Albert Pierrepoint in Hamelin Prison.

== See also ==
- IG Farben Trial
