= Jonathan Wiesen =

American history professor

- Education: University of California, Berkeley; University of Sussex; Brown University
- Occupation: Professor of modern European history
- Employer: University of Alabama at Birmingham
- Known for: Research on comparative racism, Nazi Germany, and historical memory
- Notable work: Creating the Nazi Marketplace; West German Industry and the Challenge of the Nazi Past

Jonathan Wiesen is a professor of modern European history at the University of Alabama at Birmingham and teaches courses on modern German history and the Holocaust.

== Education and Career ==
Wiesen has a bachelor's degree from UC Berkeley and studied history and philosophy at the University of Sussex. He completed his M.A. in 1992 at Brown University and his Ph.D. at Brown in 1998. He was Visiting Assistant Professor at Colgate University from 1997 to 1998 and Professor and Distinguished Teacher at Southern Illinois University Carbondale from 1998 to 2019. He has been Professor of History at the University of Alabama at Birmingham since 2019.

== Work ==
Wiesen’s research is focused on comparative racism, Nazi Germany, German-American relations, and historical memory after the Holocaust. He is the author of several books and articles and is a coeditor of Selling Modernity: Advertising in Twentieth-century Germany (2007) with Pamela Swett and Jonathan Zatlin. Wiesen and Swett are also coeditors of the Nazi Germany section of the online resource "German History in Documents and Images" by the German Historical Institute.

Wiesen was Chair of the History Department at SIU from 2016-2018 and at UAB from 2019 to 2024.

== Books ==
- Modern Germany and the American Color Line (forthcoming)
- The Routledge History of Global Nazism (coedited volume with Jennifer V. Evans, Eric Kurlander, and Julia Torrie), forthcoming with Routledge
- Nazi Germany: Society, Culture, and Politics (textbook cowritten with Pamela E. Swett), Bloomsbury Academic Publishers, 2024)
- Creating the Nazi Marketplace: Commerce and Consumption in the Third Reich (Cambridge: Cambridge University Press, 2011)
- Selling Modernity: German Advertising in the Twentieth Century (edited with Pamela E. Swett and Jonathan R. Zatlin) (Durham: Duke University Press, 2007)
- West German Industry and the Challenge of the Nazi Past, 1945-1955 (Chapel Hill and London: The University of North Carolina Press, 2001)

== Awards ==
Wiesen’s book West German Industry and the Challenge of the Nazi Past, 1945-1955 won a prize from the Hagley Museum and Library and the Business History Conference in 2002. His article “American Lynching in the Nazi Imagination: Race and Extra-Legal Violence in 1930s Germany” [German History 36, no. 1 (February 2018): 38-50], won the 2020 Hans Rosenberg article prize.
