= Tesch & Stabenow =

German manufacturer of Zyklon B

The corporation Tesch & Stabenow (in short Testa) was a market leader in pest control chemicals between 1924 and 1945, in Germany east of the Elbe. Testa distributed Zyklon, a pesticide consisting of inert adsorbents saturated with hydrogen cyanide, a volatile liquid extremely toxic to animals and humans. For legitimate use as a pesticide, Zyklon included a warning odorant as not everyone can smell cyanide or recognize its faint almond-like odor. The company sold Zyklon B, the variant of the original pesticide Zyklon, to the Wehrmacht and the SS in Auschwitz-Birkenau without the odorant, clearly showing that it was intended for use on humans. Two directors of Testa were convicted and executed after being accused of assisting the mass murder of Jews during the Second World War.

== Company history ==
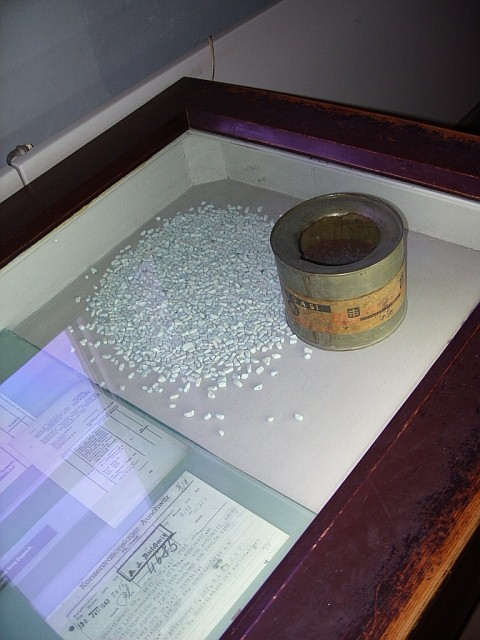
A can of Zyklon B with adsorbent granules and original signed documents detailing ordering of Zyklon B as "materials for Jewish resettlement" (on display at Auschwitz concentration camp museum)

Tesch & Stabenow was founded in 1924 in Hamburg. In 1925, the firm became the only distributor of Zyklon on behalf of Degesch east of the Elbe. In 1927, Stabenow left the firm; Bruno Tesch became 45% owner, Degesch had 55% of the shares; in June 1942, Tesch became the sole owner. Testa distributed a growing amount of the gas to the German army. In 1941, Tesch instructed the SS in Sachsenhausen in the use of the pest control gas. Starting in 1941, Testa sold Zyklon B to Auschwitz-Birkenau, Majdanek, Sachsenhausen, Ravensbrück, Stutthof, Neuengamme, Groß-Rosen and Dachau. The highest turnover of cyanide was in 1943.

The company continued in Hamburg after the war as Testa Gmbh until 1979, when it merged with Heerdt-Lingler GmbH (HeLi).

== Prosecution ==
On 3 September 1945, the British arrested Bruno Tesch, director Karl Weinbacher and employee Joachim Drosihn. They were brought before a military tribunal and charged with distributing the gas to concentration camps with the intent to kill humans. An employee even stated that Bruno Tesch himself suggested the idea to the SS. Tesch and Weinbacher were convicted in the Curiohaus trial, sentenced to death, and executed on 16 May 1946. Drosihn was acquitted.
