= Hans-Joachim Lang =

German historian and journalist

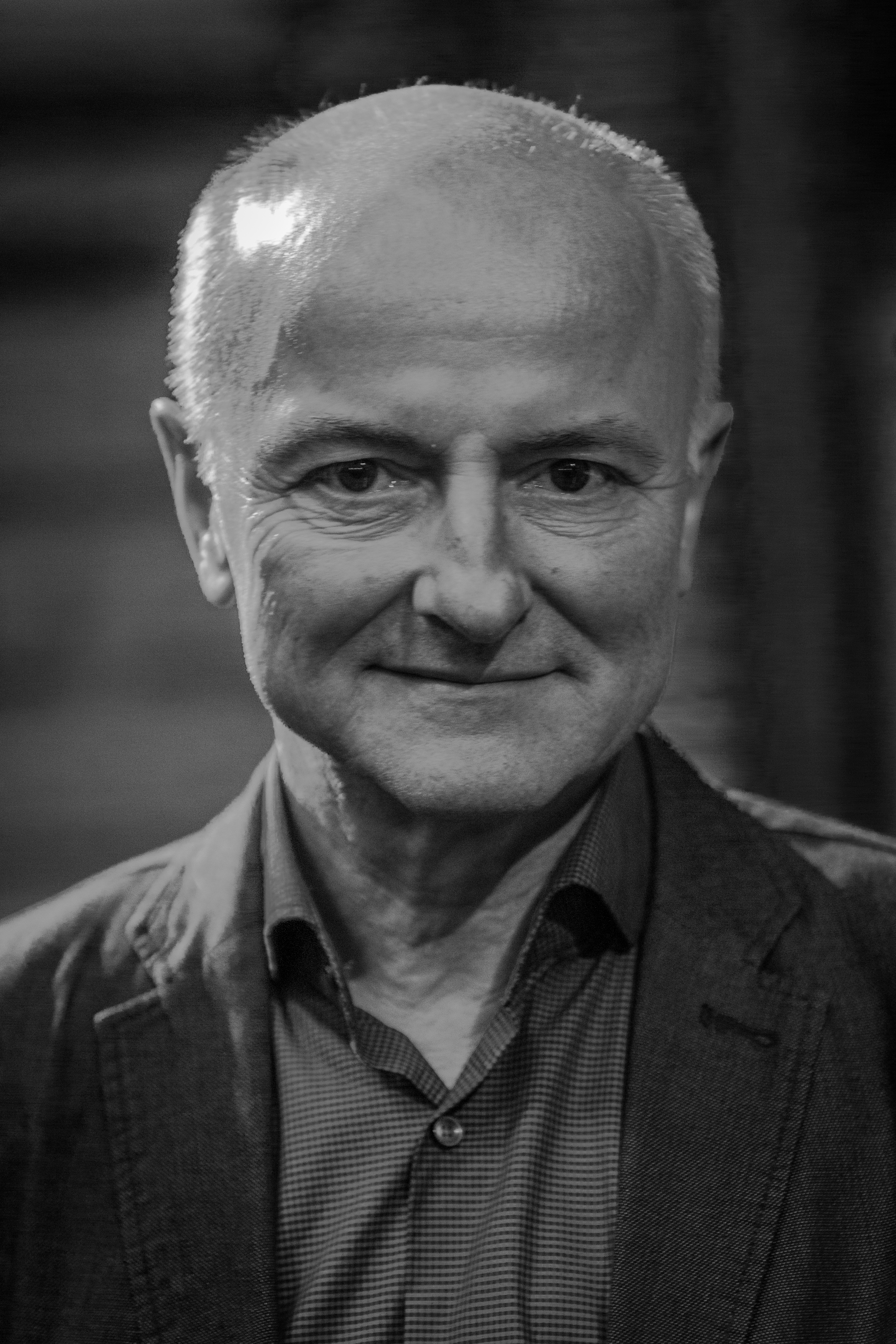
- Hans-Joachim Lang, December 2014
- Born: 6 August 1951 (age 75); Speyer, Rhineland-Palatinate, West Germany
- Education: Ph.D. (1980)
- Alma mater: University of Tübingen, Baden-Württemberg
- Occupations: Journalist, historian, political science
- Writing career
- Language: German
- Years active: 1980–present
- Notable works: Die Namen der Nummern Hoffmann und Campe, 2004, ISBN 3-455-09464-3
- Website: www.die-namen-der-nummern.de

Hans-Joachim Lang (born 6 August 1951) is a German journalist, historian, and adjunct professor of cultural anthropology at the Ludwig-Uhland Institute for Empirical Cultural Studies University of Tübingen. Dr. Lang researched and authored the award-winning book Die Namen der Nummern (The Names of the Numbers), published in 2004, which identified all of the victims murdered in the gas chamber of the Natzweiler-Struthof concentration camp for Nazi anatomist August Hirt as part of his plan to create a pseudo-scientific Jewish skeleton collection during World War II.

== Biography ==
Lang was born and grew up in Speyer. He received a doctorate in German studies and political science from the University of Tübingen, Baden-Württemberg in 1980, where he studied under the French sociologist Freddy Raphael. In 1982, he became the editor of the scientific section of the newspaper Schwäbisches Tagblatt in Tübingen. He joined the faculty at his alma mater, University of Tübingen, as an adjunct professor of cultural anthropology at the Ludwig-Uhland Institute for Empirical Cultural Studies.

In 1989, Lang and co-author and journalist Wolfgang Moser turned down the Fritz-Sänger-Preis für mutigen Journalismus (Fritz Sanger Prize for Courageous Journalism) because of Sanger's work for the Nazi press agency under Propaganda Minister Joseph Goebbels from 1933 to 1945.

Lang conducted this research in his free time over 20 years, when he was working as a science journalist. In 2017, he is an Honorary Professor and no longer a journalist. He remarks in an interview the changes in France over the time of his research. Initially, many institutions, but not all, did not respond to his request for information, "institutions in France didn't like to cooperate," but 11 years later this changed: "Dr Hans-Joachim Lang identified the victims in 2004. Eleven years later Dr. Raphael Toledano, French researcher, found together with the director of the Institute for Forensic Medicine three small glass containers, in which tiny bits of leftovers from a human stomach and five small pieces of skin were preserved, which can be attributed to Menachem Taffel, one of the 86 victims." These changes in France did not inhibit his research, first published in 2004, and allowed the later events and published material to clarify the nature of what the German University did when it was part of the German Reich during the Second World War. These changes in France are manifest in the documentary films made in 2013-2014 in France, and the added material posted at Lang's website since his book was published.

== Die Namen der Nummern (The Names of the Numbers) ==
=== Jewish skull collection ===
In June 1943, the anthropologists SS-Hauptsturmführer Bruno Beger from Munich and Hans Fleischhacker from Tübingen selected 86 Jewish prisoners in Auschwitz acting on behalf of the SS research organization "Ahnenerbe", which supported a plan of anatomy professor August Hirt to create a Jewish anatomical skeleton specimen collection. During the German occupation of France, Hirt had been appointed head of the Anatomical Institute at the Reichsuniversität Straßburg (Reichs University of Strasbourg) in 1941.

Twenty-nine women and 57 men from 8 countries were selected from Jewish prisoners in Auschwitz by Beger and Fleischhacker and brought to the Natzweiler-Struthof concentration camp, where skull x-rays and blood groups were recorded. On 11th, 13, 17 and 19 August 1943, the camp commander murdered 86 people in the gas chamber built outside the camp by the SS exclusively for poison gas experiments by medical professors on prisoners. The victims were transported by the SS from Natzweiler to the Reichsuniversität Straßburg. With the approach of the Allied troops, these bodies, preserved in formalin, were hidden in the basement of the Anatomy Institute, where they were discovered. On 23 November 1944, Strasbourg was liberated by the U.S. Seventh Army under the command of Gen. Alexander Patch. Three weeks later the French military tribunal began its investigation.

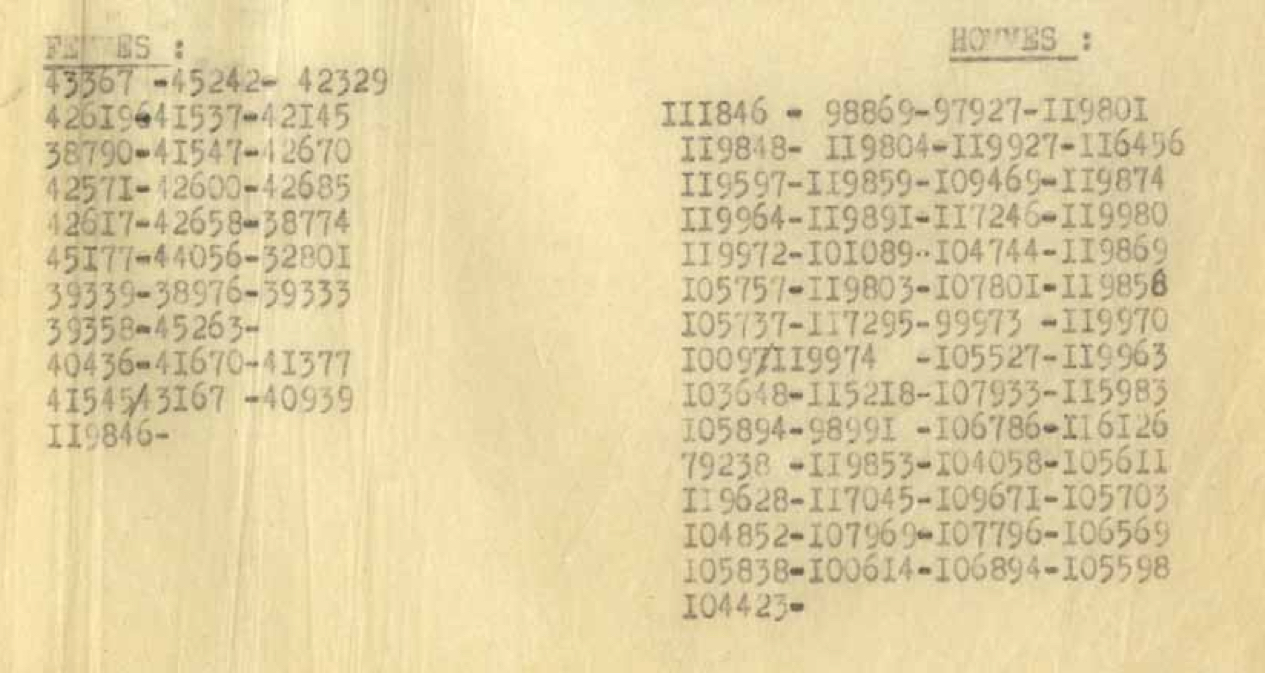
List of victims' numbers recorded by Henri Henrypierre

On 3 January 1945, an article in the London newspaper Daily Mail reported the discovery of 86 bodies in the Anatomical Institute of the Reichsuniversität Straßburg. The "French Office of Investigations of War Crimes" took photographs of the remains and documented the findings of the remains. Evidence collected formed the basis of the subsequent trial of August Hirt by the War Crimes Tribunal in Metz in 1954. The French military, which controlled Strasbourg, gave up trying to identify the victims and buried the bodies in the local Jewish cemetery in a mass grave.

At the Nuremberg Doctors' Trial in 1946, Hirt's anatomy assistant, Henri Henrypierre (or Henripierre) testified that he noted numbers tattooed on the arms of the corpses brought to the Institute, and kept a secret recording of them hidden in the apartment of his romantic interest. August Hirt was sentenced to death in absentia at the Military War Crimes Trial at Metz on 23 December 1953, however it was unknown at the time that Hirt had shot himself in the head on 2 June 1945 at Schluchsee, Baden-Württemberg.

=== Identifying the victims ===
While at the Schwäbisches Tagblatt, Dr. Lang, studied the war crimes committed by Auguste Hirt, at the Reichsuniversität Straßburg during the German occupation of France, and attempted to determine the identities of the victims in the Jewish Skeletal Collection. Other than Serge Klarsfeld, who documented his attempts in his book Le Mémorial de la déportation des Juifs de France no other attempts were previously made to identify these people.

In 1998, Dr. Lang found archives of the Reichsuniversität located at the U.S. Holocaust Memorial Museum, including the hand-written copy of the numbers recorded by Hirt's assistant, Henri Henrypierre. Together with archives at Auschwitz concentration camp and Yad Vashem, Lang was able to identify all 86 of the victims' names, and other identifying information including occupations and place of origin. He published the identities and biographies of all 86 victims in the award-winning book Die Namen der Nummern (in German) in 2004. Biographies of the victims are available online and at the U.S. Holocaust Memorial Museum website.

In November 2005 the remains of these individuals were buried in the Jewish cemetery of Cronenbourg, on the outskirts of Strasbourg, under the auspices of the Communauté Israélite of Strasbourg, the Consistoire of the Bas-Rhin, and Grand Rabbi Abraham Deutsch. A memorial was erected at the cemetery in December 2005 with the names of the 86 victims, and a memorial plaque listing the names of the victims was placed outside the Anatomy Institute at Strasbourg's University Hospital.

In an article which appeared in the Annals of Anatomy in 2013, Lang said:

The memory of their fate ... does not, as we often hear, give dignity to the victims. These are not the victims who have lost their dignity, but rather those who persecuted. Do not let the perpetrators have the last word.

=== Recognition of work ===
Bazelon remarked that "The most startling breakthrough [in identifying the victims of Nazi anatomists] comes from German journalist and Tübingen culture professor Hans-Joachim Lang."

Professor Urban Wiesing, at the Institute for Ethics and History of Medicine of the University of Tübingen, wrote that: "[T]he book is more than an essay on the moral catastrophe of medicine. It tells not only of a crime, but also writes history in a special way one step further: it gives the victims back their names."

== Other notable works ==
Lang has written several books and articles on holocaust topics and Nazi war crimes. His book Die Frauen von Block 10: Medizinische Versuche in Auschwitz. (The women of Block 10: Medical experiments in Auschwitz) tells the story of 800 women who were subjected to pseudoscientific medical experiments at Auschwitz and provides biographical information about the victims.

The book Als Christ nenne ich Sie einen Lügner – Theodor Rollers Aufbegehren gegen Hitler (As a Christian, I Call You a Liar:Theodor Roller's revolt against Hitler) tells the story of a young bank accountant named Theodor Roller who refused to sign an oath of allegiance to Adolf Hitler, and wrote letters to Hitler explaining his faith. As a result, he was imprisoned in a psychiatric facility.

An article Lang wrote for Die Zeit tells about the last person executed for murder in 1948 by the West German government in the aftermath of World War II.

== Awards ==
- 1989 – Wächterpreis der deutschen Tagespresse, (Guardian of the German Press Prize, awarded by the German Freedom of the Press Foundation) for his article on the Tübingen regional court.
- 2004 – Prize of the Auschwitz Foundation for Die Namen der Nummern
- 2008 – Leonhart Fuchs Medal of the Medical Faculty of the Eberhard Karls University of Tübingen for Die Namen der Nummern

== Publications ==
=== Books ===
- Lang, Hans-Joachim (1980). Parteipressemitteilungen im Kommunikationsfluß politischer Nachrichten : eine Fallstudie über den Einfluß politischer Werbung auf Nachrichtentexte. (revised doctoral thesis) [Party news releases on the communication flow of political news: a case study on the influence of political advertising messages and texts] (in German). Frankfurt am Main: Peter D. Lang. ISBN 3-8204-6781-5.
- Lang, Hans-Joachim (2004a). Die Namen der Nummern: wie es gelang, die 86 Opfer eines NS-Verbrechens zu identifizieren [The names of the numbers: how it was possible to identify 86 victims of Nazi crimes] (first German ed.). Hamburg: Hoffmann und Campe. ISBN 978-3455094640.
- Lang, Hans-Joachim (2009). "Als Christ nenne ich Sie einen Lügner" : Theodor Rollers Aufbegehren gegen Hitler ["As a Christian, I call you a liar": The Theodor Roller revolt against Hitler] (first German ed.). Hamburg: Hoffmann und Campe. ISBN 978-3-4555-0104-9.
- Lang, Hans-Joachim (2011). Die Frauen von Block 10: Medizinische Versuche in Auschwitz [The women of Block 10: Medical experiments in Auschwitz] (first German ed.). Hamburg: Hoffmann und Campe. ISBN 978-3455502220.

=== Selected articles ===
- Lang, Hans-Joachim (11 February 1999). "Richard Schuh, Ihr Leben ist verwirkt!" [Richard Schuh, your life is forfeit!]. Die Zeit (in German).
- Lang, Hans-Joachim (19 August 2004). "Skelette für Straßburg Eines der grausigsten Wissenschaftsverbrechen des "Dritten Reiches" ist endlich aufgeklärt" [Skeletons for Strasbourg: One of the most gruesome crimes of science in the "Third Reich" is finally cleared]. Die Zeit (in German). No. 35.
- Lang, Hans-Joachim (5 September 2013). "Ein Freund geblieben: War der einflussreiche Tübinger Politologe Theodor Eschenburg ein Nazi? Wohl kaum – wie neu gesichtete Dokumente zeigen" [One friend remained: Was the influential Tübingen political scientist Theodor Eschenburg a Nazi? Hardly – what newly found documents show]. Die Zeit (in German). No. 37.
- Lang, Hans-Joachim (6 January 2010). "NS-Verbrechen Die Spur der Skelette" [Nazi crimes: The trail of skeletons]. Spiegel Online (in German).
- Lang, Hans-Joachim (2014). "Theodor Eschenburg und die deutsche Vergangenheit" [Theodor Eschenburg and the German past]. INDES – Zeitschrift für Politik und Gesellschaft (in German). No. 1–2014. Göttingen: Vandenhoeck & Ruprecht. pp. 133–144.
- Lang, Hans-Joachim (October 2013). "August Hirt and 'extraordinary opportunities for cadaver delivery' to anatomical institutes in National Socialism: a murderous change in paradigm". Annals of Anatomy. 195 (5): 373–80. doi:10.1016/j.aanat.2013.03.013. PMID 23809210.

=== Documentaries ===
- Au nom de la race et de la science (In the name of science and race – Strassbourg 1941–1944) at IMDb, documentary directed by Sonia Rolley, Axel and Trancrède Ramonet, duration 55 min. Production France 3 – Temps Noir, April 2013.
- Le nom des 86 (The name of the 86), documentary directed by Emmanuel Heyd and Raphael Toledano, duration 63 min. Production Dora Films sas – Alsace 20 – Télébocal – Cinaps TV, 2014.
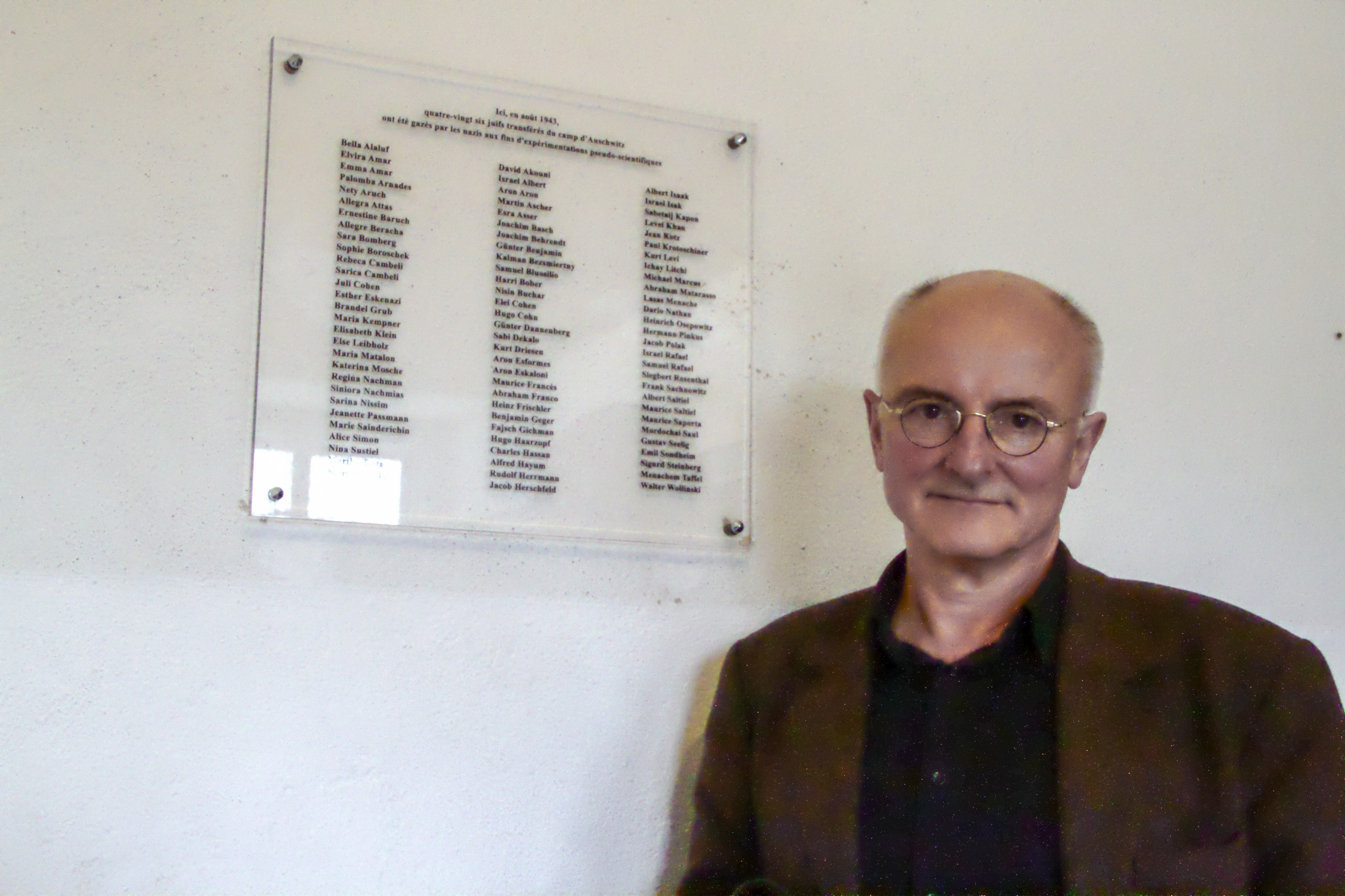
Hans Joachim Lang in front of the plaque in memory of 86 Jews killed in August 1943 in the gas chamber of Natzweiler-Struthof concentration camp.

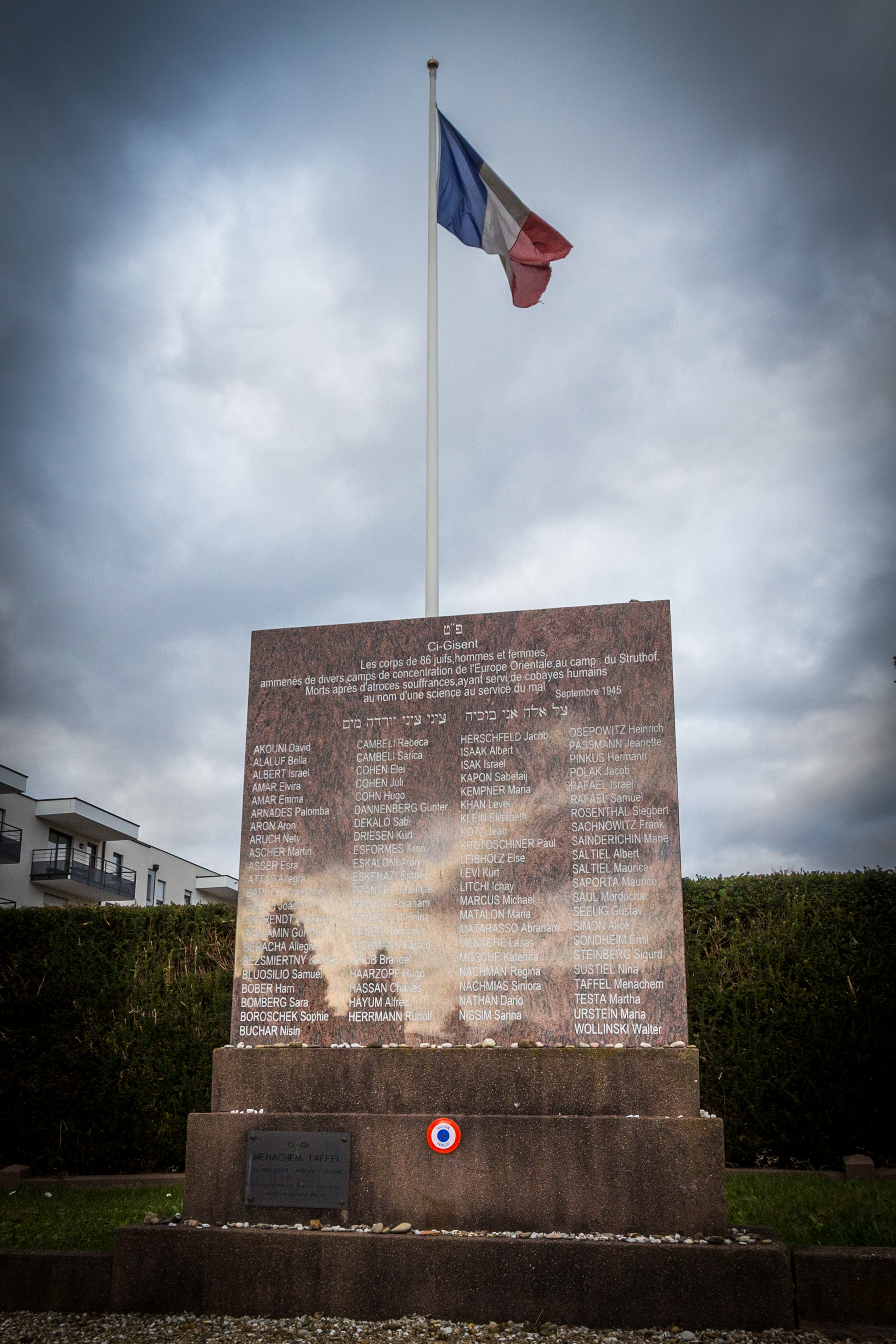
Monument to the 86 victims at the Cronenbourg Jewish Cemetery near Strasbourg

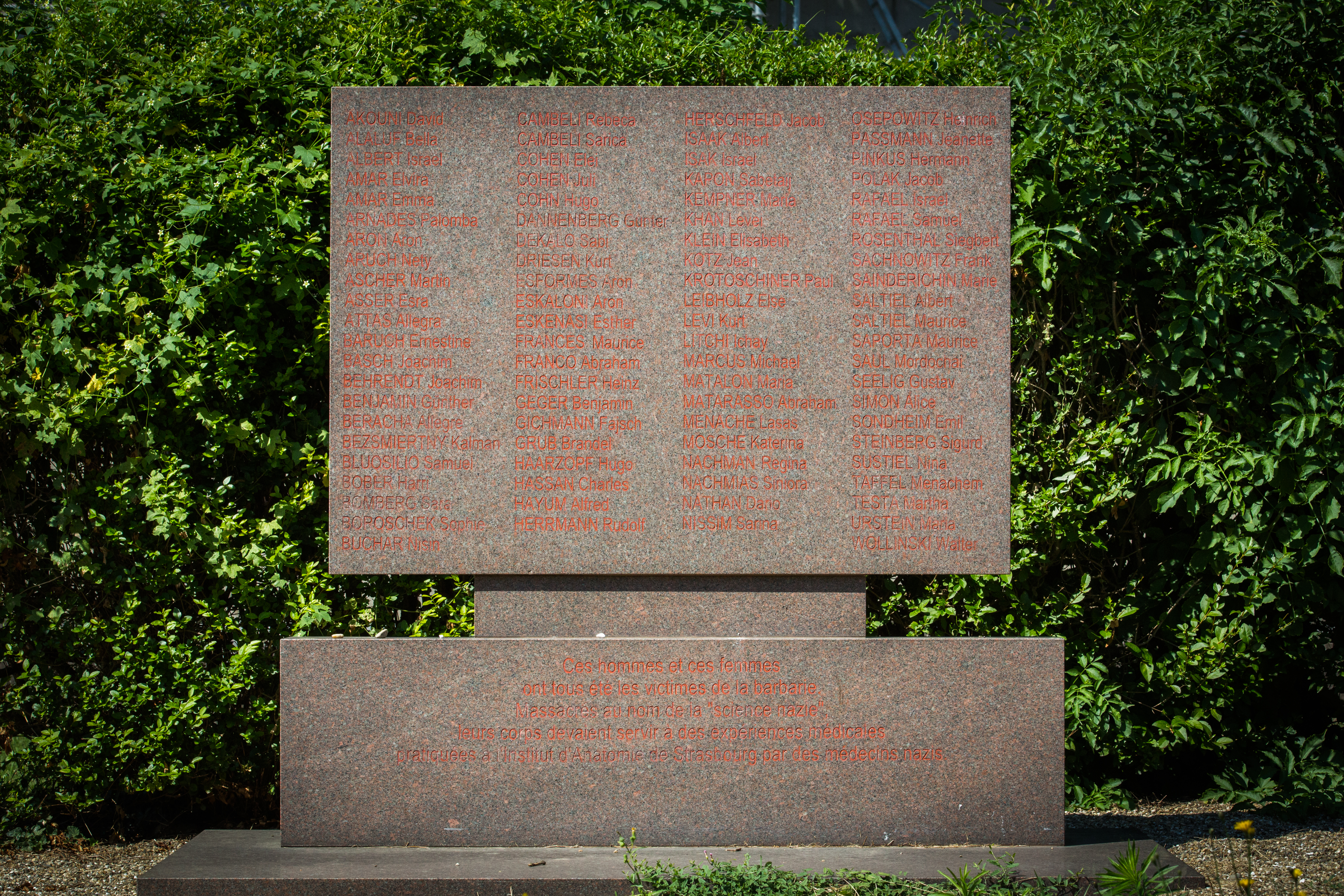
Memorial plaque with the names of the 86 victims at the Cronenbourg Jewish Cemetery

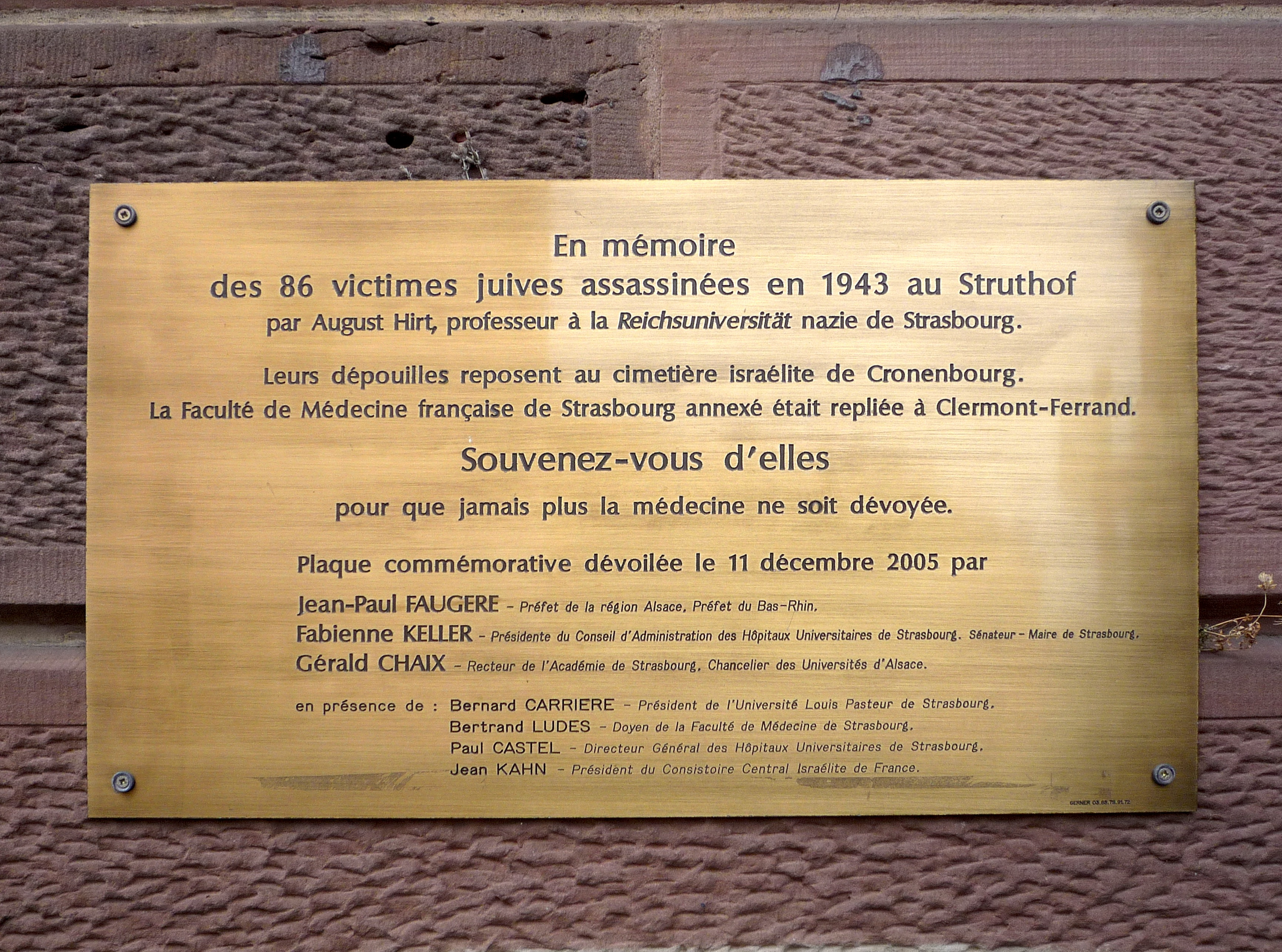
Memorial plaque at the Institute of Anatomy, University of Strasbourg

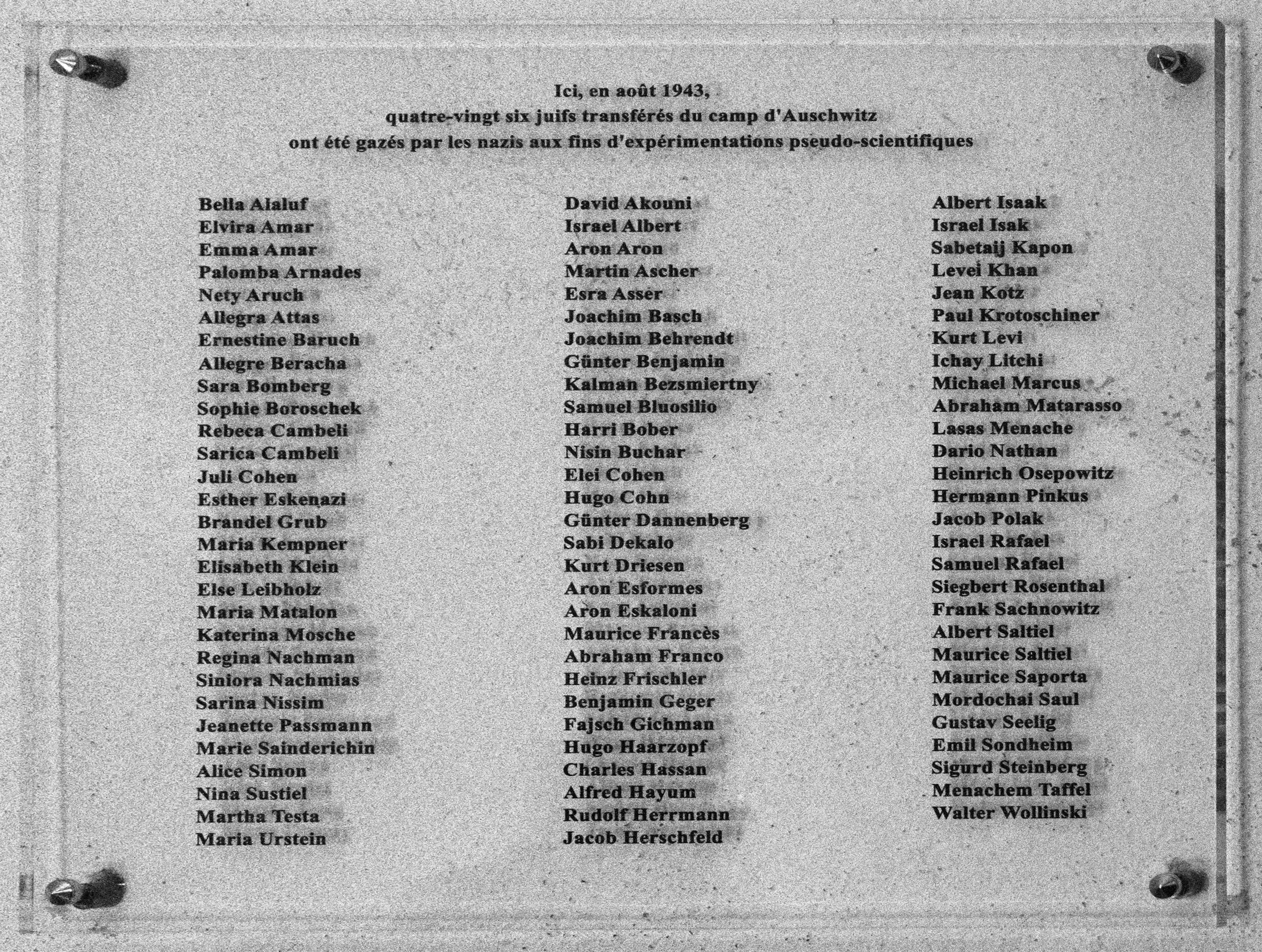
Memorial plaque with names of the victims outside of the gas chamber at Natzweiler-Struthof Concentration Camp

== See also ==
- Natzweiler-Struthof
