= Rudolf Brandt =

German civil servant and SS officer, convicted war criminal (1909–1948)

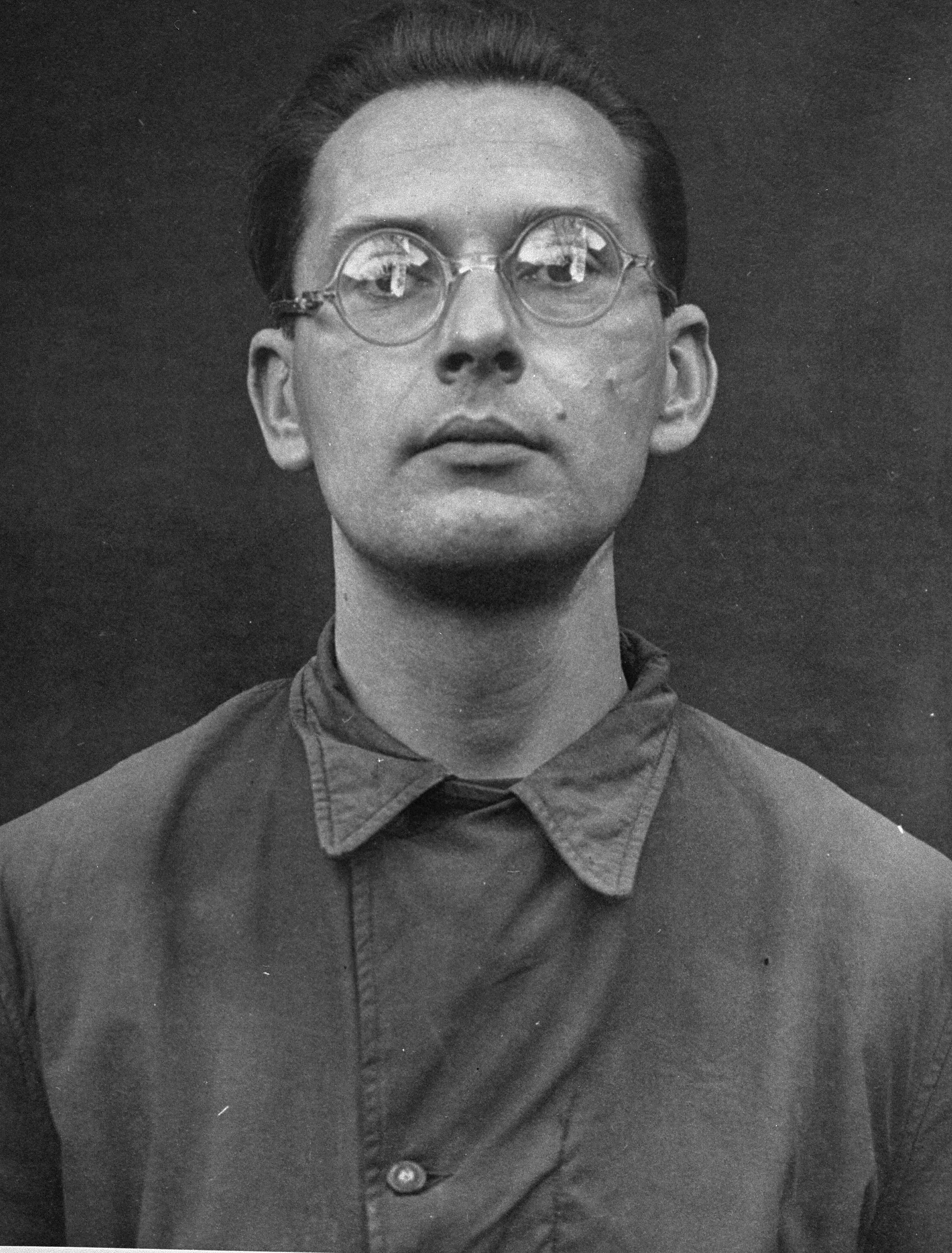
- Brandt in U.S. custody
- Born: 2 June 1909; Frankfurt, German Empire
- Died: 2 June 1948 (aged 39); Landsberg Prison, Landsberg am Lech, Allied-occupied Germany
- Cause of death: Execution by hanging
- Occupations: Lawyer, military officer
- Organization: Allgemeine SS
- Political party: Nazi Party
- Convictions: War crimes Crimes against humanity Membership in a criminal organization
- Trial: Doctors' Trial
- Penalty: Death

Rudolf Hermann Brandt (2 June 1909 – 2 June 1948) was a German SS officer from 1933–45 and a civil servant. A lawyer by profession, Brandt was the Personal Administrative Officer to Reichsführer-SS (Persönlicher Referent vom Reichsführer SS) Heinrich Himmler and a defendant at the Doctors' Trial at Nuremberg for his part in securing the 86 victims of the Jewish skull collection, an attempt to create an anthropological display of plaster body casts and skeletal remains of Jews. He was convicted of war crimes and crimes against humanity and executed in 1948. Felix Kersten, a Finnish doctor who reportedly saved thousands of Jews by influencing Himmler during the massage therapy he gave him throughout the war, tried to save Brandt from execution, as Brandt helped him by adding names on the lists intended to save camp prisoners.

== Early life and education ==
Rudolf Brandt, the son of a railway worker, was born on 2 June 1909, and raised in modest circumstances in the town of Frankfurt an der Oder. Brandt was a member of the student's stenography (shorthand) club at the Realgymnasium, and in 1927, at the age of 18, won a competition with a transcription speed of 360 syllables per minute. He attended the University of Berlin and the University of Jena (1928–1932), simultaneously working from 1928 to 1930 as a court reporter at the Provisional National Economic Council. Brandt would continue to practice stenography in the evenings with his colleague and former Frankfurt schoolmate Gerhard Herrgesell. Brandt was awarded a doctorate of law from the University of Jena in July 1933.

== Nazi Party membership ==
He joined the Nazi Party in January 1932 (membership number 1,331,536) and the Schutzstaffel (SS) in October 1933 (membership number 129,771). Brandt and his skills in transcription were noticed by Heinrich Himmler, who had him transferred to his staff. On 11 December 1933, he joined the Staff of Reichsführer-SS Himmler in the capacity of clerk. In November 1935, he was commissioned an Untersturmführer (second lieutenant) and ultimately rose to the rank of Standartenführer (colonel). In 1936, Brandt was named Chief of the Personal Staff of the Reichsführer-SS (Leiter des Persönlichen Stabes RFSS), and in 1937, Persönlicher Referent des RFSS, a position he held until the end of the war in May 1945. In this position Brandt handled Himmler's entire correspondence with the exception of matters pertaining to the Waffen-SS or the Police.

Walter Schellenberg, the Ausland-SD department chief who reported directly to Himmler, said of Brandt:

Because of his ability as a perfect stenographer, his punctuality, his untiring diligence, he became Himmler's convenient and omnipresent registering, reminding and writing machine, complaining about being overworked, and on the other hand, declaring with pride that he had to produce 3000 – 4000 outgoing letters per year. Brandt would begin work at seven in the morning, no matter what time he had gone to bed the night before. Three or four hours of sleep were sufficient for him. As soon as Himmler had risen in the morning and washed, Brandt would go to him loaded with papers and files, and while Himmler shaved he would read him the most important items of the morning's mail...If there was bad news, Brandt would preface it by saying, "Pardon, Herr Reichsführer," and thus forewarned, Himmler would temporarily suspend his shaving operations: a precautionary measure to prevent cutting himself. Brandt was certainly most important. He was the eyes and ears of his master and the manner in which he presented a matter to Himmler was often of decisive importance.

In 1938 or 1939, Brandt became Himmler's liaison officer to the Reich Ministry of the Interior and particularly to the Office Secretary of the Interior. In 1943, when Himmler became Minister of the Interior, Brandt was Ministerial Councilor and Head of the Minister's Office in the Reich Ministry of the Interior. Brandt was also a member of the Ahnenerbe society, of which Himmler was President. On account of his position, Brandt was also the liaison officer to the Reich Secretary of the Ahnenerbe Society, Wolfram Sievers. Brandt was briefly absent from Himmler's office, from 30 March 1941 to 11 May 1941. During this time he fought with the Artillery Regiment of the 1st SS Panzer Division Leibstandarte SS Adolf Hitler in the campaign against Greece.

== War crimes: Jewish skull collection ==
Originally the "specimens" to be used in the collection were to be Jewish commissars in the Red Army captured on the Eastern front by the Wehrmacht. The individuals ultimately chosen for the collection were obtained from among a pool of 115 Jewish inmates at Auschwitz concentration camp in Occupied Poland. They were chosen for their perceived stereotypical racial characteristics. The initial selections were carried out by SS-Hauptsturmführer Dr. Bruno Beger and Dr. Hans Fleischhacker, who arrived in Auschwitz in the first half of 1943 and finished the preliminary work by 15 June 1943.

Due to a typhus epidemic at Auschwitz, the candidates chosen for the skull collection were quarantined in order to prevent them from becoming ill and ruining their value as anatomical specimens. In February 1942, Sievers submitted to Himmler, through Rudolf Brandt, a report from which the following is an extract read at the Nuremberg Doctors Trial by General Telford Taylor, Chief Counsel for the prosecution at Nuremberg:

We have a nearly complete collection of skulls of all races and peoples at our disposal. Only very few specimens of skulls of the Jewish race, however, are available with the result that it is impossible to arrive at precise conclusions from examining them. The war in the East now presents us with the opportunity to overcome this deficiency. By procuring the skulls of the Jewish-Bolshevik Commissars, who represent the prototype of the repulsive, but characteristic subhuman, we have the chance now to obtain a palpable, scientific document.

The best, practical method for obtaining and collecting this skull material could be handled by directing the Wehrmacht to turn over alive all captured Jewish-Bolshevik Commissars to the Field Police. They in turn are to be given special directives to inform a certain office at regular intervals of the number and place of detention of these captured Jews and to give them special close attention and care until a special delegate arrives. This special delegate, who will be in charge of securing the 'material' has the job of taking a series of previously established photographs, anthropological measurements, and in addition has to determine, as far as possible, the background, date of birth, and other personal data of the prisoner. Following the subsequently induced death of the Jew, whose head should not be damaged, the delegate will separate the head from the body and will forward it to its proper point of destination in a hermetically sealed tin can especially produced for this purpose and filled with a conserving fluid.

Having arrived at the laboratory, the comparison tests and anatomical research on the skull, as well as determination of the race membership of pathological features of the skull form, the form and size of the brain, etc., can proceed. The basis of these studies will be the photos, measurements, and other data supplied on the head, and finally the tests of the skull itself.

== End of the war ==
In August 1944, Brandt informed Standartenführer Guntram Pflaum, whom Himmler had appointed head of pest control, of Himmler's desire to create a "Fly and Gnat Room", where "all SS leaders and police who are either uninterested in the nuisance created by flies or even dismiss it with a superior smile will find they will be taken into care there for some considerable time, during which they will have the opportunity to study the question of flies and gnats from a theoretical angle as well as to enjoy the attentions of the hundreds and thousands of flies and gnats in the room itself."

Brandt was a member of the entourage which accompanied Himmler into hiding, leaving Flensberg on 10 May 1945, with the goal of reaching Bavaria. He became separated from Himmler and surrendered along with half of the six-man group to British troops on 21 May.

== Trial and execution ==
Rudolf Brandt was indicted in October 1946 by the US Military Tribunal, on charges of:

1. Conspiracy to commit war crimes and crimes against humanity;
2. War crimes, to wit performing medical experiments without the subjects' consent on prisoners of war and civilians of occupied countries, as well as participation in the mass-murder of concentration camp inmates;
3. Crimes against humanity: committing crimes described under count 2 also on German nationals; and
4. Membership in a criminal organization, the SS.

Brandt, in common with most of the defendants at the Doctor's Trial, was acquitted on the first count as the Tribunal felt that it fell outside their jurisdiction.

He was found guilty on the other three counts, as he had been responsible for the administration and coordination of the experiments at the camps. He was hanged on 2 June 1948, his 39th birthday.
