= Bruno Beger =

German racial anthropologist (1911–2009)

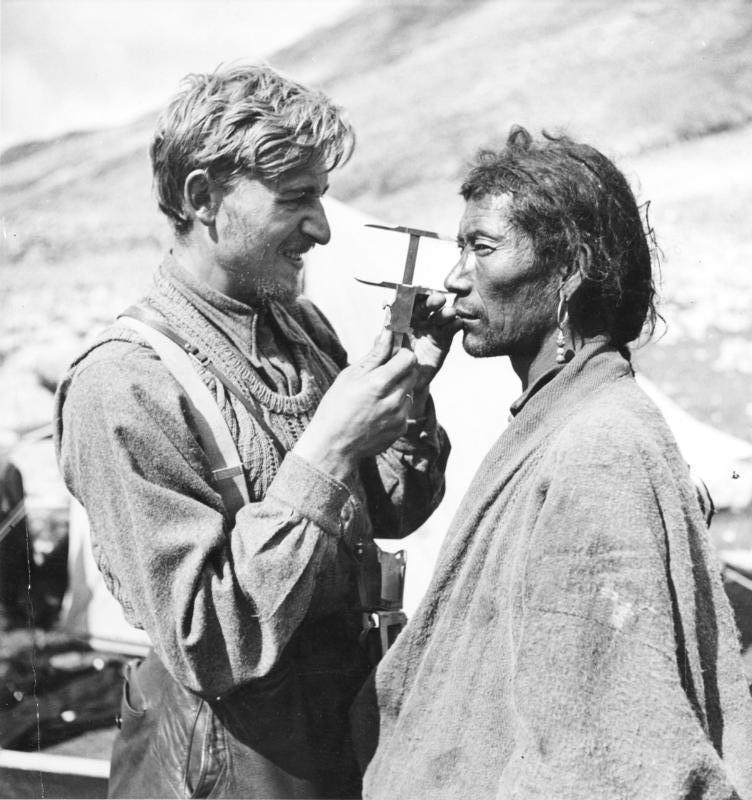
- Beger conducting anthropometric studies in Sikkim
- Born: 27 April 1911; Frankfurt am Main, German Empire
- Died: 12 October 2009 (aged 98); Königstein im Taunus, Germany
- Education: University of Jena
- Occupations: Anthropologist, explorer, ethnologist
- Known for: 1938–1939 German expedition to Tibet; Jewish skull collection
- Conviction: Accessory to murder (86 counts)
- Penalty: 3 years imprisonment

Bruno Beger (27 April 1911 – 12 October 2009) was a German racial anthropologist, ethnologist, and explorer who worked for the Ahnenerbe. In that role he participated in Ernst Schäfer's 1938–1939 expedition to Tibet, helped the SS Race and Settlement Main Office (Rasse- und Siedlungshauptamt der SS, RuSHA) identify Jews, and later helped select human subjects to be killed to create an anatomical study collection of Jewish skulls.

== Early life ==
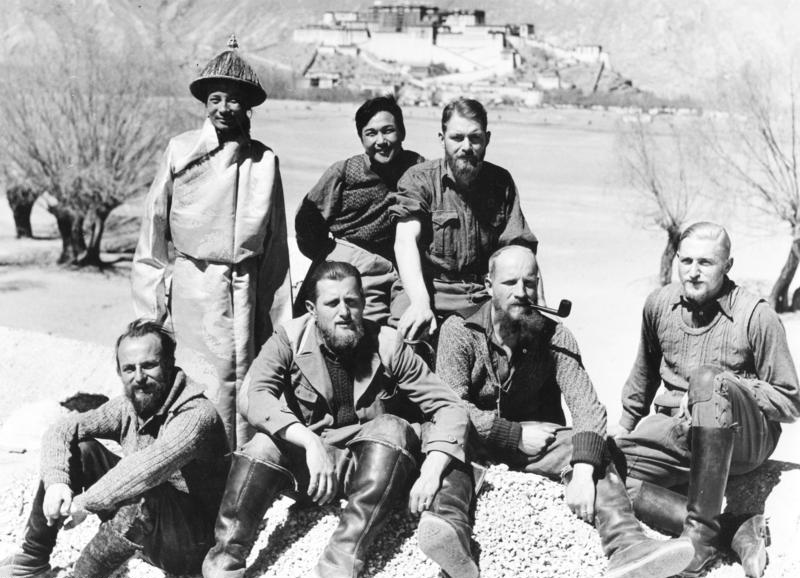
Beger (far right) with the Tibet expedition and their Sikkimese interpreters, Kaiser Bahadur Thapa and Rabden Khazi, in 1938.

Beger was born in 1911 to an old Heidelberg family that soon after came upon hard times when Beger's father was killed in World War I. A family friend paid for him to attend the University of Jena where he was first exposed to Hans F. K. Günther in a lecture, who would encourage him through his early academic career in anthropology and ethnology.

== Service in the SS ==
In 1934, Beger began working a part-time job in the Race and Settlement Office of the SS where he eventually became a section head. Beger was asked to be part of an expedition to Hawaii, but while this was awaiting final approval, he was invited on a trip to Tibet led by Ernst Schäfer which he accepted instead.

In a proposal he wrote to Schäfer, Beger stated his contribution to the expedition would be "to study the current racial-anthropological situation through measurements, trait research, photography and moulds... and to collect material about the proportion, origins, significance and development of the Nordic race in this region."

== 1938–39 expedition to Tibet ==
All through the expedition, Beger kept a travel diary which was published in book form 60 years later, Mit der deutschen Tibetexpedition Ernst Schäfer 1938/39 nach Lhasa (Wiesbaden, 1998). Only 50 copies of it exist.

== Jewish skull collection ==
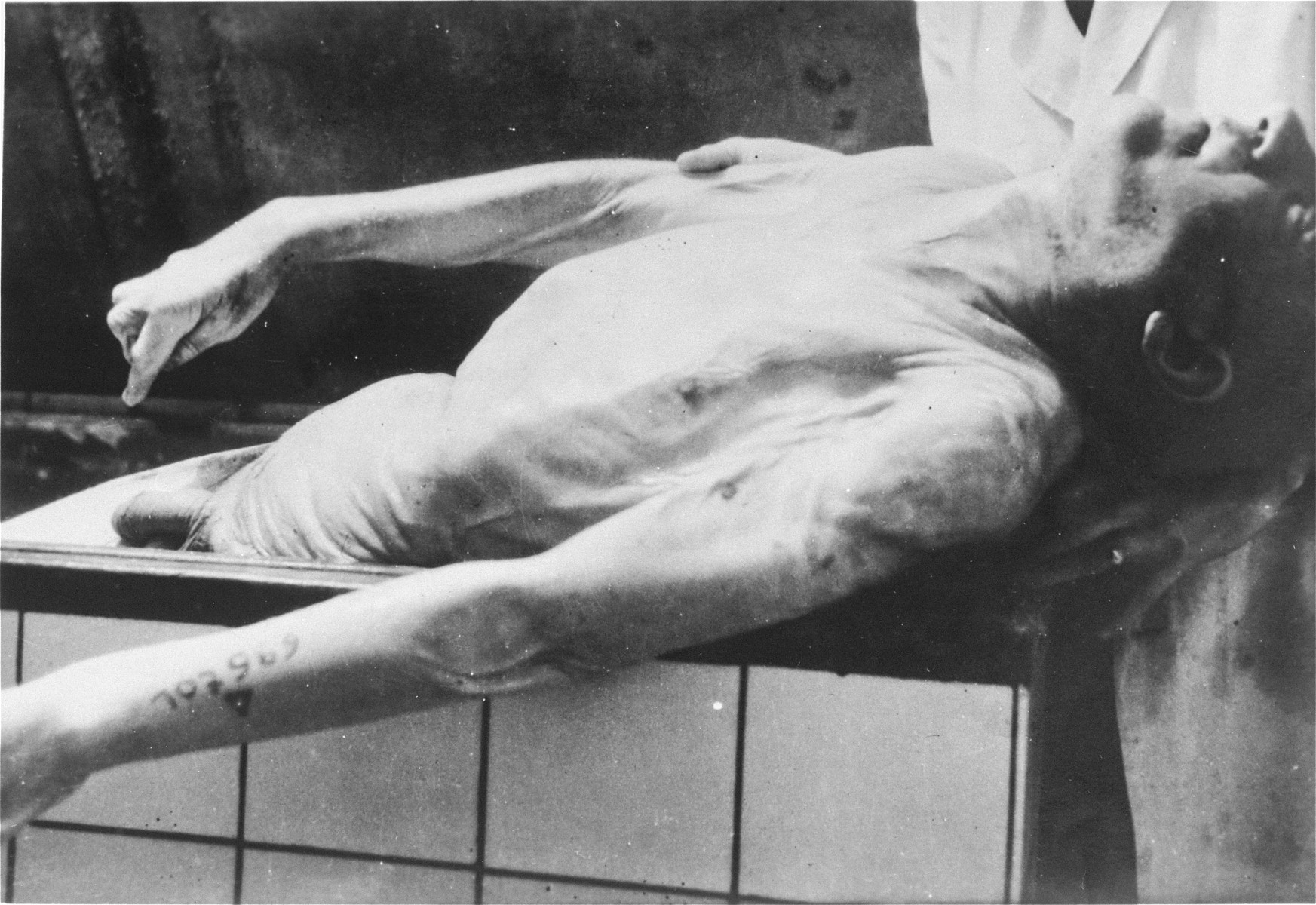
Menachem Taffel's body, part of the Jewish skull collection

Beger worked together with August Hirt at the Reichsuniversität Straßburg. His assignment, which he carried out, was to provide the Nazi doctor with detainees of diverse ethnic types from various concentration camps in order to serve Hirt's lethal racial experiments. The work involved selecting over 100 individuals from Auschwitz to be murdered for their skulls and exhibited as the Jewish skull collection. They were mainly Jews, and the crime was exposed during the Nuremberg trials in 1946. The collection was sanctioned by Reichsführer-SS Heinrich Himmler, and designed by and under the direction of August Hirt, with Rudolf Brandt and Wolfram Sievers, general manager of the Ahnenerbe, being responsible for procuring and preparing the corpses. The victims were sent to Natzweiler concentration camp for gassing by SS-Hauptsturmführer Josef Kramer, the Kommandant of the camp. Their corpses were then sent to Hirt in Strasburg. In these endeavours he was assisted by doctors Hans Endres, Hans Fleischhacker, Heinrich Rübel and Rudolf Trojan.

== After the war ==
After the war, Beger was interned by American occupation forces. With the exception of August Hirt, who killed himself, all of his superiors were prosecuted in the immediate aftermath of the war: Rudolf Brandt and Wolfram Sievers were both executed by American occupation forces after being convicted at the Doctors' Trial, while Josef Kramer was executed by British occupation forces after being convicted at the Belsen trials.

However, in February 1948, Beger was classified as "exonerated" by a denazification tribunal which was unaware of his role in the Jewish skull collection. In 1960, an investigation into the collection began in Ludwigsburg, and Beger was taken into custody on 30 March 1960. He was released four months later.

The investigation continued until coming to trial on 27 October 1970. Beger claimed that he was unaware the Auschwitz prisoners he measured were to be killed. While two others indicted in the trial were released, Beger was convicted on 6 April 1971, and sentenced to three years in prison for being an accomplice in the murder of 86 Jews. However, he was then released immediately due to time served. Neither of his colleagues with whom he was tried, Hans Fleischhacker and Wolf-Dietrich Wolff, were convicted.

According to his family, Beger died in Königstein im Taunus on 12 October 2009.

== See also ==
- SS-Rasse- und Siedlungshauptamt

== Published work ==
- Meine Begenungen mit dem Ozean des Wissens, Kurt und Dieter Schwartz, Königstein, 1986, 11 pages. Broschüre zum 75. Geburtstag von Bruno Beger in einer Auflage von 250 Stück. OCLC 611195622.
- Mit der deutschen Tibetexpedition Ernst Schäfer 1938/39 nach Lhasa, Schwartz, Wiesbaden, 1998, 280 pages. Notes: Includes text of: Geheimnis Tibet: erster Bericht der Deutschen Tibet-Expedition Ernst Schäfer. München: Verlag F. Bruckmann, 1943. Contains an essay by Bruno Beger who was part of the expedition. Maps on lining papers. Description: xxxi, 249 p. : ill. (some col.), col. maps; 26 cm. ISBN 9783935102353; 3935102356. OCLC Numbers: 660670280; 163817098.
- Czwienk, Jürgen, and Georg Graffe. 2004. Die Expeditionen der Nazis Abenteuer und Rassenwahn. Gescher: PolarFilm. Notes: Filmbericht, Deutschland 2004. - Extras: 2 Bonusfilme: Burma Road (41 Min.), China: 1932 - 1935 (15 Min.). Performer(s): Mit: Ernst Schäfer, Bruno Beger. Description: 1 DVD-Video (Ländercode 0, 50 + 56 Min.): s/w, Dolby digital stereo. 12 cm. Responsibility: ein Film von Jürgen Czwienk und Georg Graffe. ISBN 3937163476; 9783937163475. OCLC Number: 314606494.
- Beger, Bruno. 1964. Es war in Tibet: Erlebtes im Himalaya und in Tibet. Frankfurt: Akademie für das Graphische Gewerbe. Herstellung: Semesterarbeit von Friedrich Beger. OCLC 611114953.
- Beger, Bruno. 1941. Die Bevölkerung der altmärkischen Wische: eine rassenkundliche Untersuchung. @Berlin, Univ., Math.-Naturwiss. Fak., Diss., 1941. OCLC 252078607.
