= August Hirt =

German anatomist and SS officer (1898–1945)

- Born: August Erwin Theobald Hirt; 28 April 1898; Mannheim, Grand Duchy of Baden, German Empire
- Died: 2 June 1945 (aged 47) Schluchsee, Württemberg, Allied-occupied Germany
- Allegiance: German Empire; Nazi Germany
- Branch: Imperial German Army; Schutzstaffel
- Rank: SS-Sturmbannführer
- Conflicts: World War I; World War II; Battle of France

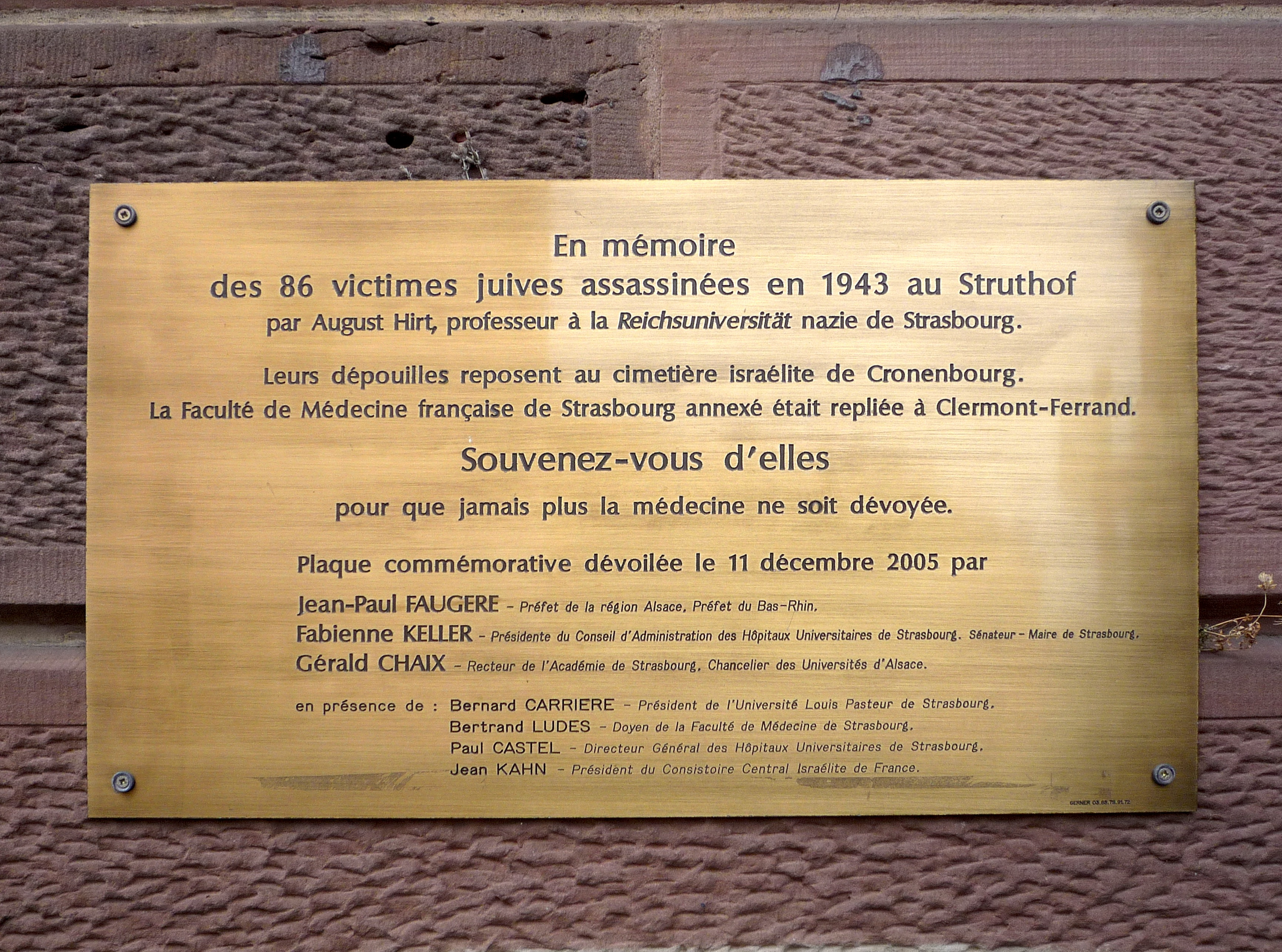
Memorial of the 86 Jewish victims murdered in 1943 at Struthof by August Hirt. Located at Institute of Anatomy of Strasbourg (Hôpital civil).

August Hirt (28 April 1898 – 2 June 1945) was an anatomist with Swiss and German nationality who served as a chairman at the Reich University in Strasbourg during World War II. He performed experiments with mustard gas on inmates at the Natzweiler-Struthof concentration camp and played a leading role in the murders of 86 people at Natzweiler-Struthof for the Jewish skull collection. The skeletons of his victims were meant to become specimens at the Institute of anatomy in Strasbourg, but completion of the project was stopped by the progress of the war. He was an SS-Hauptsturmführer ('captain') and by 1944, an SS-Sturmbannführer ('major').

== World War I, post-war education and joining the Nazi party ==
Hirt was the son of a Swiss businessman. In 1914, he volunteered, while still a high school student, to fight in World War I on the German side. In October 1916, he was wounded in the upper jaw by a bullet. He received the Iron Cross, 2nd Class and the Wound Badge and returned to Mannheim in 1917 where he received his Abitur. He studied medicine at Heidelberg University. In 1921, he gained German citizenship. In 1922, Hirt obtained his doctorate in medicine with Der Grenzstrang des Sympathicus bei einigen Sauriern ('The Ganglions in the Sympathetic Nervous System of Some Lizards'). He then worked at the Anatomical Institute in Heidelberg and in 1925 he was authorized to teach thanks to a thesis on nerve cells. In 1930 he became professor at Heidelberg University.

In September 1932, Hirt joined the Militant League for German Culture. On 1 April 1933, he joined the Schutzstaffel (SS-Nr. 100,414), and was promoted to Hauptsturmführer ('captain') on 1 July 1937, but he was only a member of the Nazi Party from 1 May 1937, when he enrolled in the universities of the Reich (Mitgliedsnr. 4,012,784). From 1 March 1942, he was a member of the personal staff of the RuSHA, the organisation in charge of "racial and ideological purity" of the members of the SS. He attained the rank of Sturmbannführer ('major') in 1944.

Hirt was married and had a son and a daughter.

== World War II ==
From 1 April 1936 Hirt was associate director of the Institute of anatomy at University of Greifswald. On 1 October 1938, he obtained the same post at Goethe University Frankfurt. At the beginning of the Second World War, he was an SS medical chief (from August 1939 to April 1941). During this time the Battle of France took place, resulting in the fall of France and its occupation by German forces, and Hirt participated in the battle. He then became director of the new Institute of anatomy at the Reichsuniversität Straßburg.

=== Jewish skull collection ===
The Ahnenerbe under the Third Reich was a society that organised "medical experiments" on prisoners. Hirt conceived and directed one called the Jewish skull collection, which was begun but not completed as intended. He also performed experiments on cadavers and collected human skulls. He was appointed director since 1941 of the Institute of Anatomy in Strasbourg. He wanted to create a collection of skulls of "Judeo–Bolsheviks", as part of his research on race. According to him, the Jewish race was on the point of extinction and he wished to gather a collection of them while there was still time. Hirt sent his project to Reichsführer-SS Heinrich Himmler. Hirt wrote of this project: "We have large collections of skulls of almost all races and peoples at our disposal. Of the Jewish race, however, only a very few specimens of skulls are available... The war in the East now presents us with the opportunity to overcome this deficiency."

Hirt conceived the project to go beyond a collection of skulls, to a collection of Jewish skeletons and so presented his research plan to Himmler. He approved the project so that Hirt could begin his "medical experiments." Working with the Ahnenerbe, Wolfram Sievers, Bruno Beger, Hans Fleischhacker and Hirt together collected people from among the Auschwitz concentration camp inmates in order to create an anatomical specimen collection specifically of Jews. Hirt proposed to use the small-scale gas chamber at the Natzweiler-Struthof concentration camp to murder the people selected, keeping their corpses intact, and then have their corpses shipped immediately to the Anatomical Institute in Strasbourg for the casts and skeletons he wanted for this collection.

Hirt directed that 115 persons be selected for measurements: 79 Jewish men, 30 Jewish women, 2 Poles, and 4 "Asians". They were selected among the inmates in August 1943 at Auschwitz by his assistants, the anthropologists Bruno Beger and Hans Fleischhacker. The group was quarantined to protect them from a typhus epidemic in the camp. Measurements were taken of the selected inmates at Auschwitz. Of those initially selected, it is believed that 89 persons (60 men and 29 women) were sent to Natzweiler-Struthof. Three men died en route, leaving 86 people.

=== Natzweiler-Struthof ===
These 86 people were sent to Natzweiler-Struthof on 30 July 1943. They were fed reasonably well to improve their appearance for the body casts. They were divided into four groups and successively gassed by Josef Kramer, on 11, 13, 17, and 19 August 1943. Their bodies were returned to Hirt at the anatomical laboratory of the Reich University in Strasbourg for preparation as an anthropological display, taking body casts and preparing the skeletons.

In September 1944, the rapid approach of the Allies led to the project being abandoned and Himmler ordered the destruction of all traces of this compromising collection. That order was not completed, nor had the casts been taken and the skeletons been prepared. The Allies found corpses and partial remains preserved in formalin for eighty-six bodies upon the liberation of Strasbourg. The corpses were buried 23 October 1945 in the municipal cemetery of Strasbourg-Robertsau before being transferred in 1951 to the Jewish cemetery of Strasbourg-Cronenbourg. The names of the victims were not known, nor was the purpose for their presence at the Anatomical Institute. Some information was learned in post-war trials as to the project proposed by Hirt.

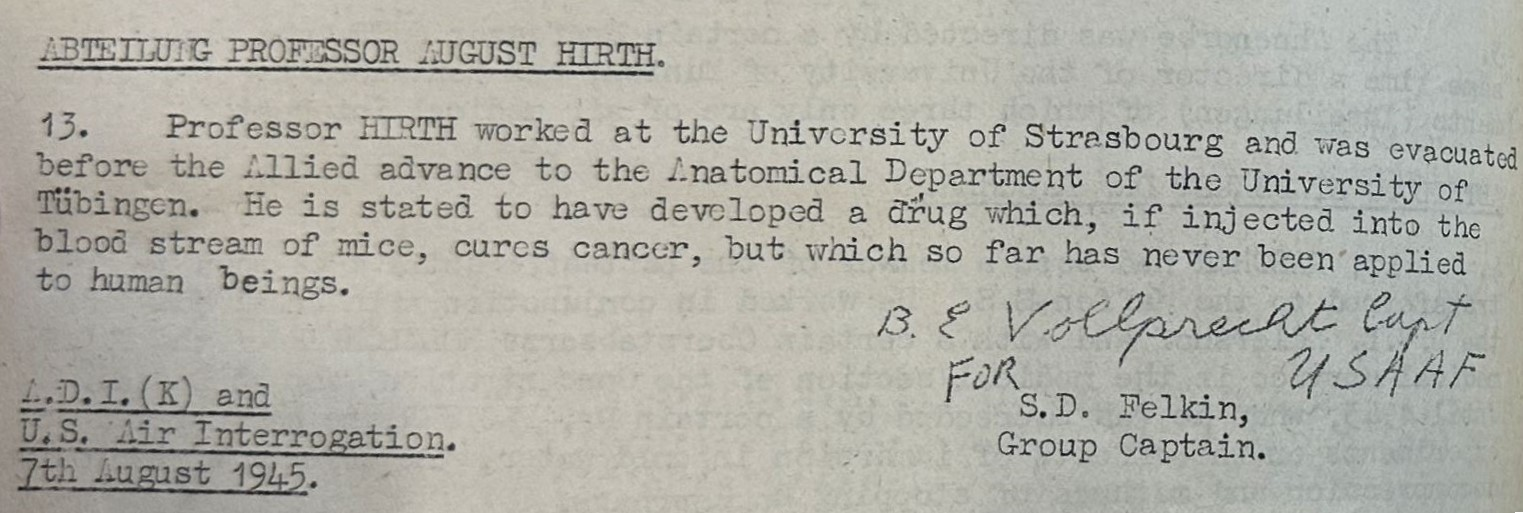
A note on Hirt from Allied intelligence

August Hirt fled Strasbourg in September 1944, hiding in Tübingen in southern Germany across the river from Alsace.

== Death ==
Hirt committed suicide on 2 June 1945, aged 47, at Schluchsee, Baden-Württemberg, in the Black Forest. His suicide was not known when he was tried in absentia at the Military War Crimes Trial at Metz on 23 December 1953 for his war crimes. His death was finally confirmed in the mid-1960s when the Israeli secret service had his body exhumed, and an Israeli pathologist conclusively identified the remains.

Some records prepared for his trial are in possession of the US National Archives, including the list of identification numbers tattooed on the prisoners at Auschwitz and

photocopies of certificates of proof of ancestry, in connection with research on prisoners in the Konzentrationslager Natzweiler, ...Feb. 9-Nov. 3, 1942. Partial copies of slips for the admittance of prisoners into the Konzentrationslager Natzweiler, medical examinations on prisoners, and a death certificate, Dec. 9, 1942-Aug. 9, 1944. Feb. 9, 1942-Aug. 9, 1944 [...] .

== Posthumous ==
In his 2004 book, Hans-Joachim Lang describes this mass murder and recounts how he was able to determine the identities of 86 victims, 60 years after they were murdered. In November 2005, the remains of some of these victims were buried in the Jewish cemetery of Cronenbourg on the outskirts of Strasbourg, in the same area where bodies of other victims were buried in 1951, names unknown. On 11 December 2005, a memorial engraved with the names of the 86 victims was placed there. In addition, a memorial plaque honouring the victims was placed outside the Anatomy Institute at Strasbourg's University Hospital. In 2015, a researcher, Raphael Toledano, identified tissue samples of victims in test tubes and a jar in the Strasbourg Medical Institute's closed collection. This followed his discovery of a 1952 letter from the then-director of the institute, Camille Simonin, about the experiments directed by Hirt. On 6 September 2015, these remains were buried in the Cronenbourg Cemetery.

== See also ==
- Block 10
- Anton Dilger
- Eduard Pernkopf
- Hermann Stieve

== Sources ==
- "l'Alsace au temps des 'malgré nous'" [Alsace in the Time of the 'in Spite of Ourselves']. Encyclopédie, B&S Editions (in French). 2010. Archived from the original on 7 June 2017.
- Henry, Diana Mara (2007). "Photographs at Natzweiler-Struthof". Diana Mara Henry. Archived from the original on 21 February 2015.
- Lang, Hans-Joachim (2004a). Die Namen der Nummern. Wie es gelang, die 86 Opfer eines NS-Verbrechens zu identifizieren [The Names of the Numbers. How It Was Possible to Identify the 86 Victims of a Nazi Crime] (in German). Hamburg: Hoffmann und Campe. ISBN 3-455-09464-3. LCCN 2004464984. OCLC 56333828. OL 18839336M.
- Lang, Hans-Joachim (19 August 2004). "Skelette für Straßburg" [Skeletons for Strasbourg]. Die Zeit (in German).
- Lang, Hans-Joachim (2024). "Home". The Names of the Numbers (in English, German, French, Greek, Hebrew, Dutch, Norwegian, and Polish).
  - Lang, Hans-Joachim (2024a). "Chronicle - News". In Lang (2024).
  - Lang, Hans-Joachim (2024b). "Scientific Murders". In Lang (2024).
- "Des restes de victimes d'un anatomiste nazi découverts à Strasbourg" [The Remains of Victims of Nazi Anatomist Discovered in Strasbourg]. Le Monde (in French). AFP. 19 July 2015.
- Leeson, Rosanne; Landé, Peter (2008). "Natzweiler Medical Experiments. Natzweiler-Strutthof Camp. A Small List with a Big Lesson". JewishGen.
- Pringle, Heather Anne (2006). The Master Plan: Himmler's Scholars and the Holocaust (1st ed.). New York: Hyperion. ISBN 0786887737. LCCN 2005050254. OCLC 60671887. OL 3426435M.
- Reamey, Anne S. (n.d.). "August Hirt: Deadly Collector of the Victims of the Holocaust". The Holocaust History Project. Archived from the original on 26 December 2013.
- Shirer, William Lawrence (1960). The Rise and Fall of the Third Reich: A History of Nazi Germany. New York City: Simon & Schuster. ASIN B0766DKDLR. LCCN 60006729. OCLC 1286630. OL 5794925M. Wikidata Q138029595.
- United States Army (1967). "German Documents Among the War Crimes Records of the Judge Advocate Division, Headquarters, United States Army, Europe" (PDF). U.S. National Archives and Records Administration.

== Documentary film ==
- Heyd, Emmanuel; Toledano, Raphael [in French] (2014). Le nom des 86 [The Names of the 86] (in French, English, and German). France: Dora Films.
