= Jewish skull collection =

Attempted Nazi anthropological display

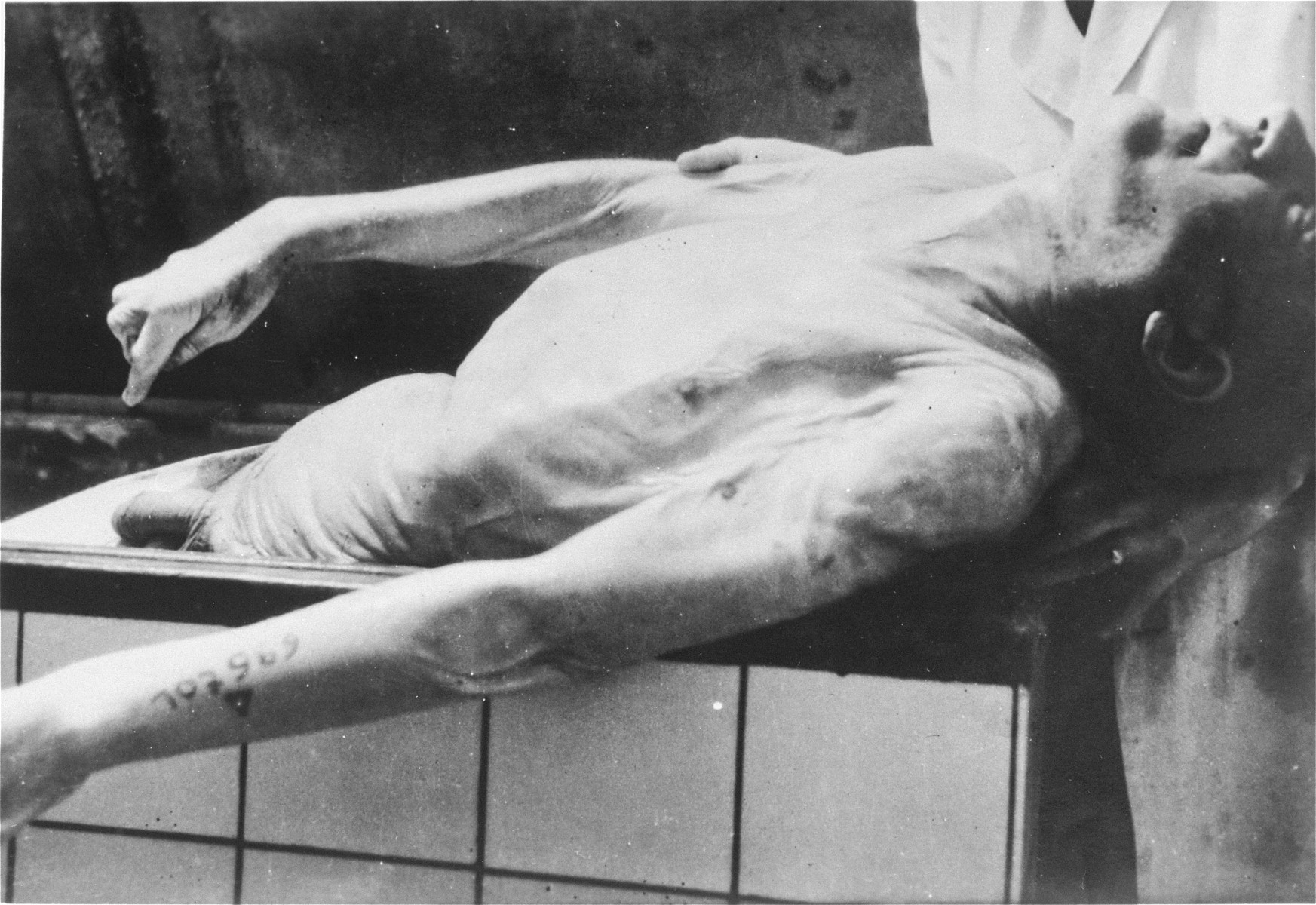
Menachem Taffel's body, part of the Jewish skeleton collection

The Jewish skull collection was an attempt by Nazi Germany to create an anthropological display to showcase the alleged racial inferiority of the "Jewish race" and to emphasize the Jews' status as Untermenschen ('subhumans'), in contrast to the Aryan race, which the Nazis considered to be superior. The collection was to be housed at the Anatomy Institute at the Reichsuniversität Straßburg in the annexed region of Alsace, where the initial preparation of the corpses was performed.

The collection was sanctioned by Reichsführer-SS Heinrich Himmler, and designed by and under the direction of August Hirt with Rudolf Brandt and Wolfram Sievers, general manager of the Ahnenerbe, being responsible for procuring and preparing the corpses.

Work by Hans-Joachim Lang published in 2004 revealed the identities and family history of all the victims of this project, based on discovery of the prisoner numbers found at Natzweiler-Struthof in records of those vaccinated against typhus at Auschwitz. The list of names has been placed on a memorial at the cemetery where all were buried, at the facility used to murder them, and at the Anatomical Institute where the corpses were found in 1944.

== Selection ==
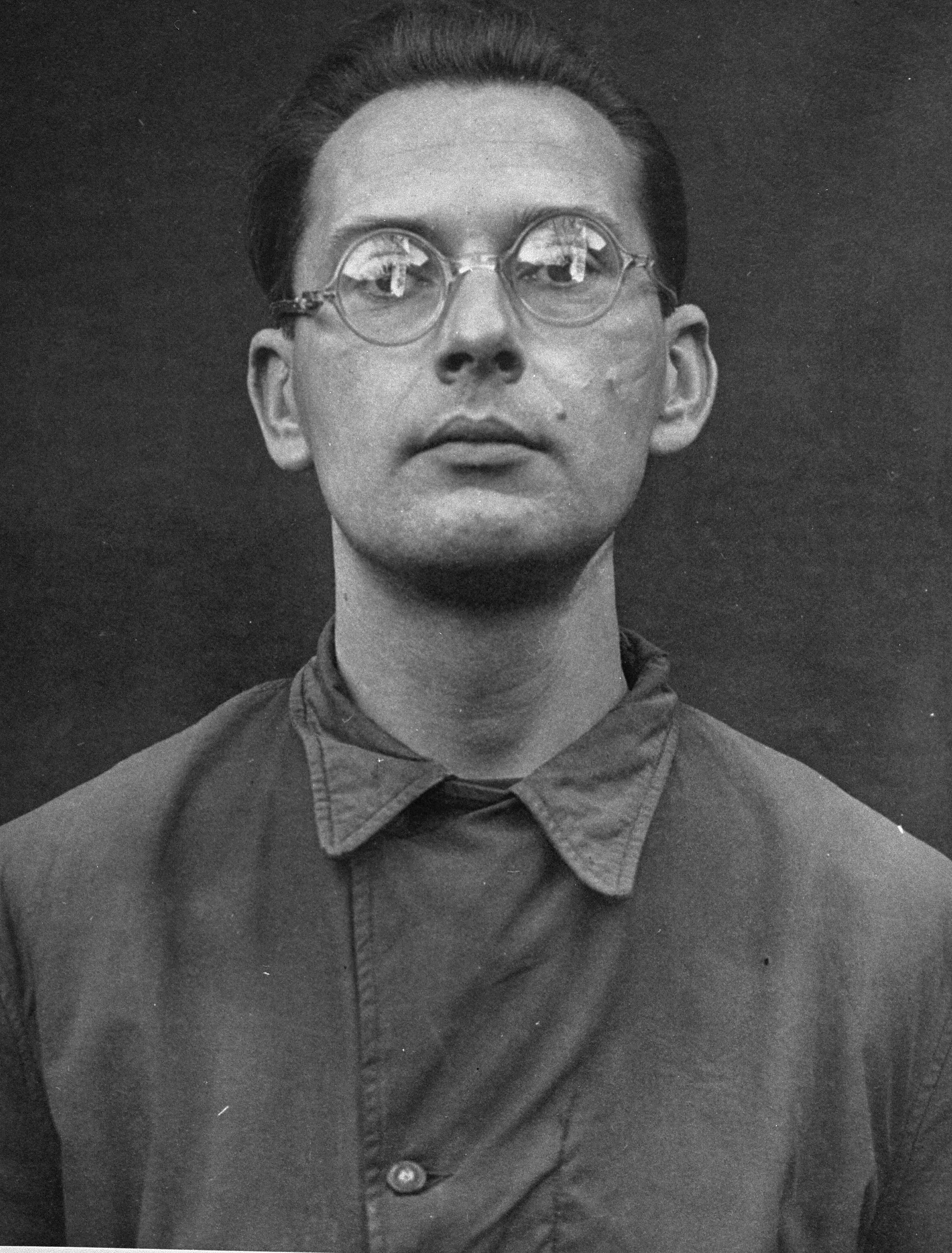
Mugshot of Rudolf Brandt, c. 1946

The project was designed by August Hirt, who directed the phases that were performed before the end of the war ended the project prior to its completion. Originally the "specimens" to be used in the collection were to be Jewish commissars in the Red Army captured on the Eastern front by the Wehrmacht. The 86 individuals ultimately chosen for the collection were obtained from among a pool of 115 Jewish inmates at Auschwitz concentration camp in Occupied Poland. They were chosen for their perceived stereotypical racial characteristics. The initial selections and preparations were carried out by SS-Hauptsturmführer Bruno Beger and Hans Fleischhacker, who arrived in Auschwitz in the first half of 1943 and finished the preliminary work by 15 June 1943.

Due to a typhus epidemic at Auschwitz, the candidates chosen for the skeleton collection were quarantined in order to prevent them from becoming ill and ruining their value as anatomical specimens. In that time, the physical measurements were taken from the selected group of people. An excerpt from a letter written by Sievers in June 1943 reports on the preparation and the typhus epidemic:

Altogether 115 persons were worked on, 79 were Jews, 30 were Jewesses, 2 were Poles, and 4 were Asiatics. At the present time these prisoners are segregated by sex and are under quarantine in the two hospital buildings of Auschwitz.

In February 1942, Sievers submitted to Himmler, through Rudolf Brandt, a report from which the following is an extract read at the Nuremberg Doctors Trial by General Telford Taylor, Chief Counsel for the prosecution at Nuremberg:

We have a nearly complete collection of skulls of all races and peoples at our disposal. Only very few specimens of skulls of the Jewish race, however, are available with the result that it is impossible to arrive at precise conclusions from examining them. The war in the East now presents us with the opportunity to overcome this deficiency. By procuring the skulls of the Jewish-Bolshevik Commissars, who represent the prototype of the repulsive, but characteristic subhuman, we have the chance now to obtain a palpable, scientific document.

The best, practical method for obtaining and collecting this skull material could be handled by directing the Wehrmacht to turn over alive all captured Jewish-Bolshevik Commissars to the Field Police. They in turn are to be given special directives to inform a certain office at regular intervals of the number and place of detention of these captured Jews and to give them special close attention and care until a special delegate arrives. This special delegate, who will be in charge of securing the "material" has the job of taking a series of previously established photographs, anthropological measurements, and in addition has to determine, as far as possible, the background, date of birth, and other personal data of the prisoner. Following the subsequently induced death of the Jew, whose head should not be damaged, the delegate will separate the head from the body and will forward it to its proper point of destination in a hermetically sealed tin can especially produced for this purpose and filled with a conserving fluid.

Having arrived at the laboratory, the comparison tests and anatomical research on the skull, as well as determination of the race membership of pathological features of the skull form, the form and size of the brain, etc., can proceed. The basis of these studies will be the photos, measurements, and other data supplied on the head, and finally the tests of the skull itself.

— Nuremberg Doctors Trial

== Preparation ==
Ultimately, 87 of the inmates were shipped to Natzweiler-Struthof. These people were kept for about two weeks in block 13 of the camp so that they might eat well to improve their appearance for the desired casts of their corpses. The deaths of 86 of these inmates were, in the words of Hirt, "induced" in an improvised gassing facility at Natzweiler-Struthof, and their corpses were sent to Strasbourg – 57 men and 29 women. The gassing occurred on 11, 13, 17, and 19 August, conducted by commandant Josef Kramer, who directed the victims to undress, placed the poison in the ventilation, and watched the people fall to their deaths. One victim was shot for fighting against being gassed and thus was not part of the collection. Josef Kramer, acting commandant of Natzweiler-Struthof (who became the commandant at Auschwitz and the last commandant of Bergen Belsen), personally carried out the gassing of the victims, per his testimony at his post-war trial. It is believed that three men died in transport from Auschwitz to Natzweiler-Struthof.

The next part of the process for this "collection" was to make anatomical casts of the bodies prior to reducing them to skeletons. With the approach of the Allies in 1944, there was concern over the possibility that the corpses could be discovered, as they had still not been defleshed. In September 1944, Sievers telegrammed Brandt: "The collection can be defleshed and rendered unrecognizable. This, however, would mean that the whole work had been done for nothing – at least in part – and that this singular collection would be lost to science, since it would be impossible to make plaster casts afterwards."

Some work had been done at the Anatomical Institute, but the project was never completed. The body casts were not made, and the corpses were not defleshed as skeletons. When the Allies arrived, they found the corpses, some complete and some beheaded, preserved by formalin.

== Aftermath ==
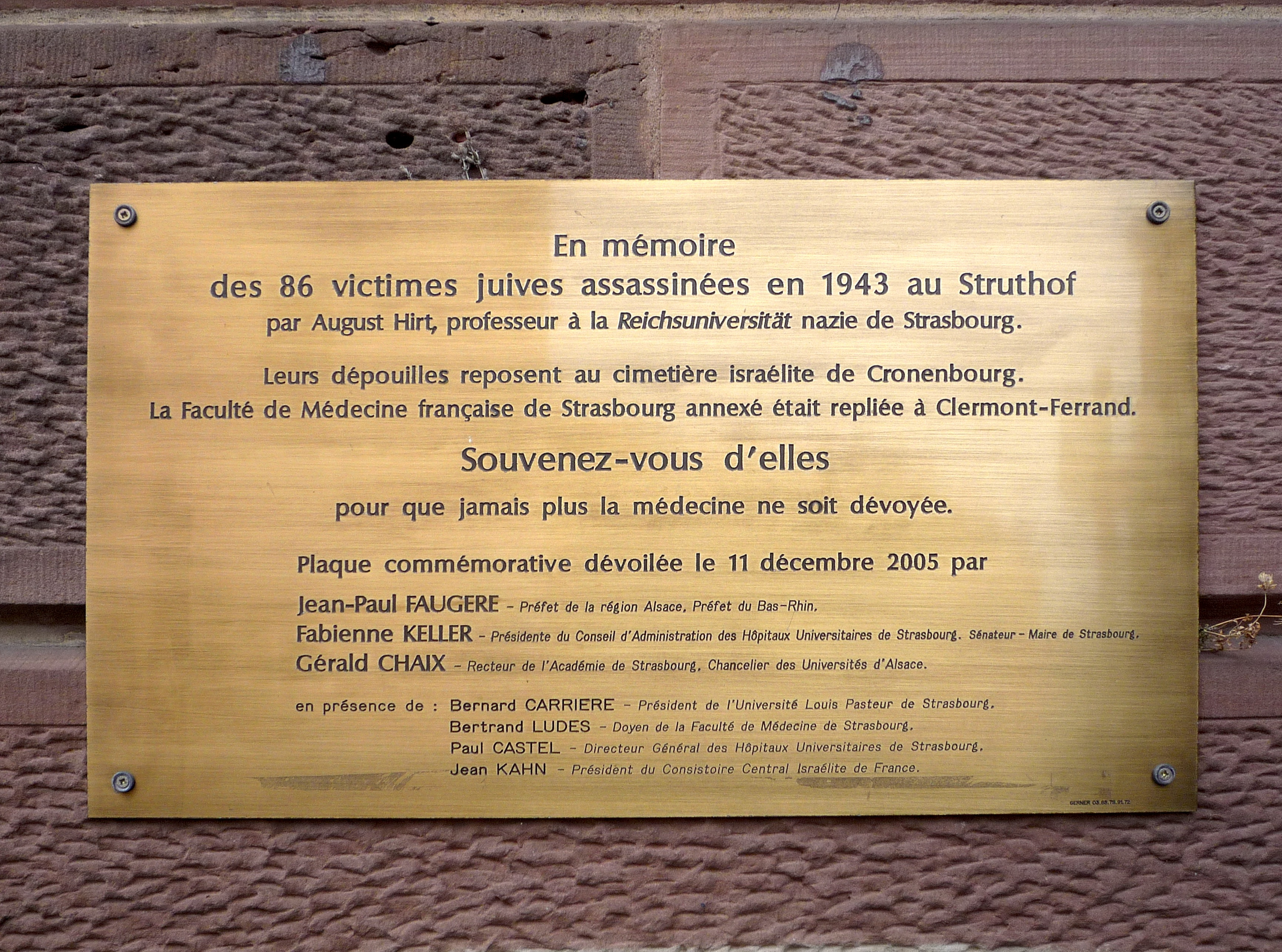
Memorial plaque at the Institute of Anatomy, University of Strasbourg

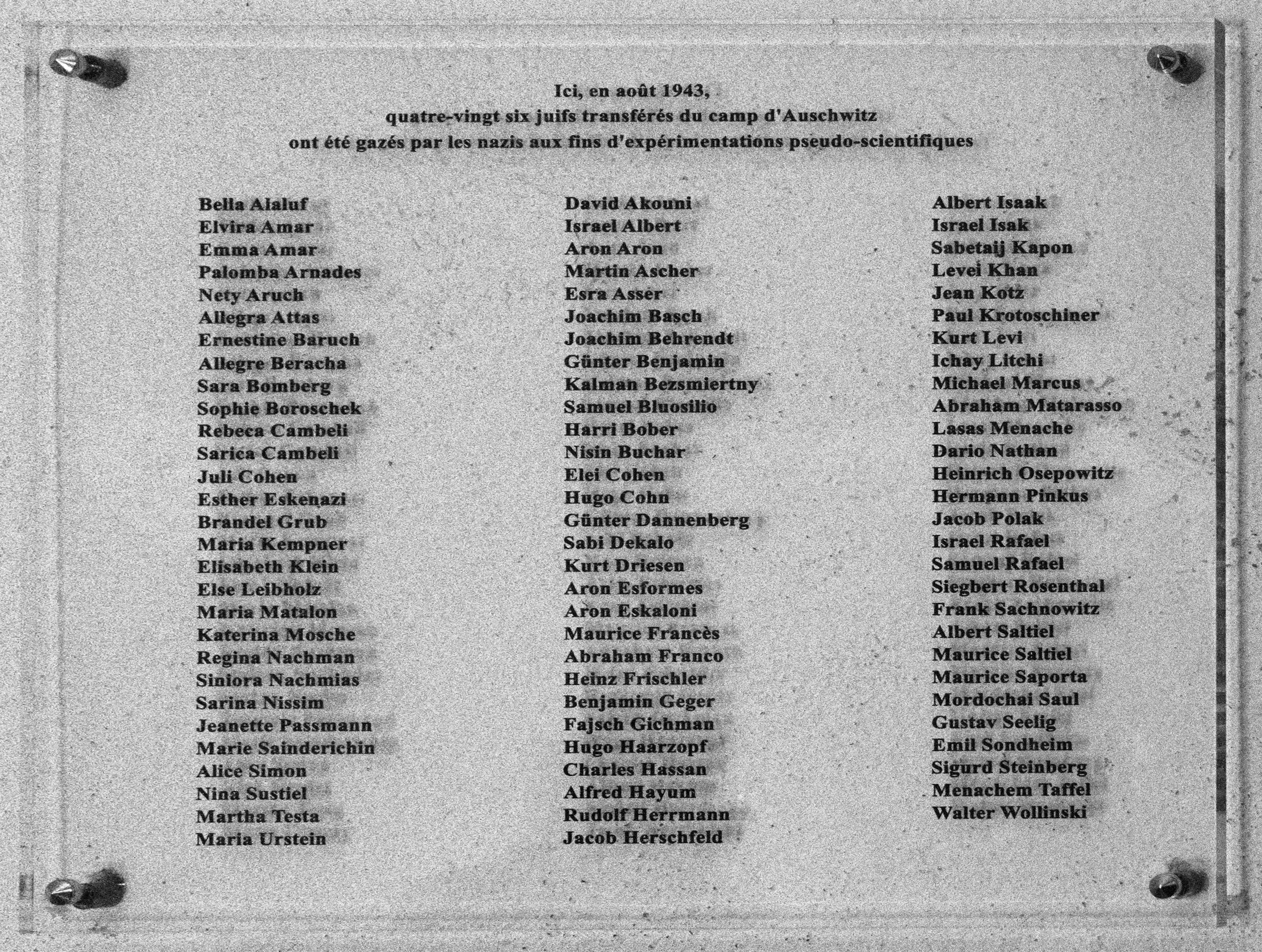
Memorial plaque with names of the victims outside of the gas chamber at Natzweiler-Struthof Concentration Camp

Brandt and Sievers were indicted, tried, and convicted in the Doctors' Trial in Nuremberg, and both were hanged in Landsberg Prison on 2 June 1948. Josef Kramer was convicted of war crimes and hanged at Hamelin Prison by British executioner Albert Pierrepoint on 13 December 1945. August Hirt, who conceived the project, was sentenced to death in absentia at the Military War Crimes Trial at Metz on 23 December 1953. It was unknown at the time that Hirt had shot himself in the head on 2 June 1945, near the town of Schluchsee, while hiding in the Black Forest.

In 1974, Bruno Beger was convicted by a West German court as an accessory to 86 murders for his role in procuring the victims of the Jewish skeleton collection. Hans Fleischhacker was acquitted at the same trial. Beger was sentenced to three years imprisonment, the minimum sentence, but did not serve any time in prison, after being given credit for time served. According to his family, Beger died in Königstein im Taunus on 12 October 2009.

For many years, only a single victim was positively identified through the efforts of Serge and Beate Klarsfeld: Menachem Taffel (prisoner no. 107969), a Polish born Jew who had been living in Berlin. In 2003, Hans-Joachim Lang, a German professor at the University of Tübingen, succeeded in identifying all the victims by comparing a list of inmate numbers of the 86 corpses at the Reichsuniversität Straßburg, surreptitiously recorded by Hirt's French assistant Henri Henrypierre, with a list of numbers of inmates vaccinated at Auschwitz. The names and biographical information of the victims were published in the book Die Namen der Nummern ('The Names of the Numbers'). Rachel Gordon and Joachim Zepelin translated the introduction to the book into English at the web site where the whole book is posted in German, including the biographies of the 86 people.

Lang recounts in detail the story of how he determined the identities of the 86 victims gassed for Hirt's project of the Jewish skeleton collection. Forty-six of these individuals were originally from Thessaloniki, Greece. The 86 were from eight countries in German-occupied Europe: Austria, Netherlands, France, Germany, Greece, Norway, Belgium, and Poland.

In 1951, the remains of the 86 victims were re-interred in one location in the Cronenbourg-Strasbourg Jewish Cemetery. On 11 December 2005, memorial stones engraved with the names of the 86 victims were placed at the cemetery. One is at the site of the mass grave, the other along the wall of the cemetery. Another plaque honouring the victims was placed outside the Anatomy Institute at Strasbourg's University Hospital. On 9 July 2015, French doctor Raphael Toledano discovered at the Forensic Institute's Museum of Strasbourg several tissue samples hidden away, presumed to be from Menachem Taffel. These last remains were buried in the Jewish cemetery of Cronenbourg on 6 September 2015.

As journalist and researcher Lang stated, once his long research was published on the identities of the 86 people killed under Hirt's orders, "The perpetrators should not be allowed to have the final word."

== See also ==
- Ahnenerbe
- Bullenhuser Damm
- Kaiser Wilhelm Institute of Anthropology, Human Heredity, and Eugenics
- Nazi human experimentation
- Research Materials: Max Planck Society Archive
