= Hans Endres =

German religious philosopher and author

Hans Endres (born 26 February 1911 in Stuttgart – died 11 June 2004 in Heidelberg) was a German religious philosopher and author. He was a pioneer in the para-scientific areas of transpersonal psychology and integral management.

Endres studied at Heidelberg University, the University of Vienna, the University of Graz and in London, studying philosophy, psychology, pedagogy, anthropology and psychiatry, amongst other subjects. Prior to commencing his studies at Graz he became a member of the Nazi Party.

He completed his doctorate in psychology and psychiatry at Heidelberg under Ernst Krieck, his thesis focusing on the issues of inter-racial marriage and children. He was then an assistant to Jakob Wilhelm Hauer in the Indological Institute of the University of Tübingen, subsequently teaching comparative religion at the university. With his writing advocating the use of experimentation on humans, Endres became a member of the Schutzstaffel in 1939 and in 1942 worked with their SS-Rasse- und Siedlungshauptamt. On account of his wide academic interests, he was recruited by Bruno Beger for a role in the latter's study of the tribes of the Caucasus in 1942. His role was to perform "racial intelligence examinations" in order to help codify the inhabitants of the region as Nordic, Asian or mixed.

After the Second World War Endres worked as a private psychologist and had a number of business and writing interests.
