= Berthold Wehmeyer =

German murderer

- Born: 7 June 1925; Berlin, Weimar Republic
- Died: 11 May 1949 (aged 23); Lehrter Straße Prison, Allied-occupied Germany
- Status: Executed by guillotine
- Convictions: Murder; Rape; Robbery
- Penalty: Death (5 July 1948)

Details
- Victims: Eva Kusserow, 60
- Date: 23 April 1947
- Location: Allied-occupied Germany

Berthold Wehmeyer (7 June 1925 – 11 May 1949) was a German murderer and the last criminal sentenced to death and executed in West Berlin, as well as Germany other than East Germany as a whole.

== Biography ==
On 22 April 1947, Wehmeyer, a trained locksmith, and his companion, Hans Wagner, a baker, set out on a so-called hoarding trip to the Prignitz region. In Wusterhausen the next day, they met the 60-year-old Eva Kusserow from Berlin-Weißensee, who was also on a hoarding trip. That same evening, the three met again in Wusterhausen. While Wehmeyer's acquaintance and Kusserow successfully exchanged their barter goods for potatoes, Wehmeyer was unsuccessful. In order to gain possession of Eva Kusserow's 20 kilograms (44 lb) of potatoes, Wehmeyer and his acquaintance strangled the woman. In addition, they raped her. The two convicts hid the woman's body in a field near Wusterhausen, where it was found on 28 April 1947.

A few days later, Wehmeyer and his acquaintance were identified as suspects by the Berlin criminal police and arrested. However, with the means of forensic technology available at the time, it was not possible to clearly assign the blame for the murder to one of the two suspects, especially since the two accused each other. Wehmeyer's acquaintance later recanted his confessions and, together with his wife, incriminated the suspect Berthold Wehmeyer as the main perpetrator. In a psychiatric report, Wehmeyer was also attested to be a "coarse violent offender" with an "unusual sexual drive". He had already been convicted of robbery in another case at the age of sixteen. His acquaintance, on the other hand, was certified as having a normal sexuality.

In the trial before the Berlin jury court on 5 July 1948, Berthold Wehmeyer was sentenced to death for murder and to five years in prison for rape as the main perpetrator on the basis of the Reich Criminal Code of 1871, which continued to apply after the end of the war with the exception of its state protection provisions. The co-defendant received a sentence of six years in prison for accessory to murder. The appeal of the sentence filed by Wehmeyer's defense counsel was rejected. Wehmeyer's plea for clemency was also unsuccessful. A first execution date of 10 May 1949, was postponed because Wehmeyer's attorney named a new alleged witness and requested a retrial. This request was promptly denied and Wehmeyer was executed in the early morning hours of 11 May 1949, in the execution room of the Lehrter Straße cellular prison with the guillotine.

Although the Basic Law had been passed for the three western occupation zones of Germany (excluding Berlin) on 8 May 1949, thereby also abolishing capital punishment, it was not approved by the Western Allies until 12 May 1949, and came into force at the end of 23 May 1949. In West Berlin, the Basic Law applied until German reunification in 1990 only insofar as the measures of the occupying powers did not restrict its application. Their reservations precluded federal organs from directly exercising state power over Berlin. Thus, capital punishment was only partially abolished by resolution of the West Berlin Senate in agreement with the Western Allies on 20 January 1951. Until then, death sentences were commuted to life imprisonment. In the case of particularly serious violations of the Allied War Weapons Control Council Act and in the case of sabotage against Allied installations and personnel, the Allied jurisdiction remained in force in Berlin, which in the case of the United States also provided for the imposition of capital punishment. Only with the end of the Allied occupation of Berlin after reunification was it abolished.

== See also ==
- Capital punishment in Germany
- List of most recent executions by jurisdiction
- Richard Schuh

== Sources ==
- Jacobs, Peter (25 May 2002). "Berlins letzte Guillotine" [Berlin's Last Guillotine]. Berliner Zeitung (in German).
- Kellerhoff, Sven-Felix (24 November 2021) [2019-05-11]. "Das letzte Fallbeil fiel in der "Irrenabteilung" Moabit" [The Last Fall Hat Fell in the "insane Department" Moabit]. Die Welt (in German).
- Posmik, Kai (9 May 2009). "Mord auf der Hamsterfahrt" [Murder on the Hoarding Trip]. Berliner Zeitung (in German).
- Leber, Sebastian [in German] (10 May 2009). "Gnadenlos" [Merciless]. Der Tagesspiegel (in German). Archived from the original on 16 May 2022.
