= Josef Kramer =

German SS officer (1906–1945)

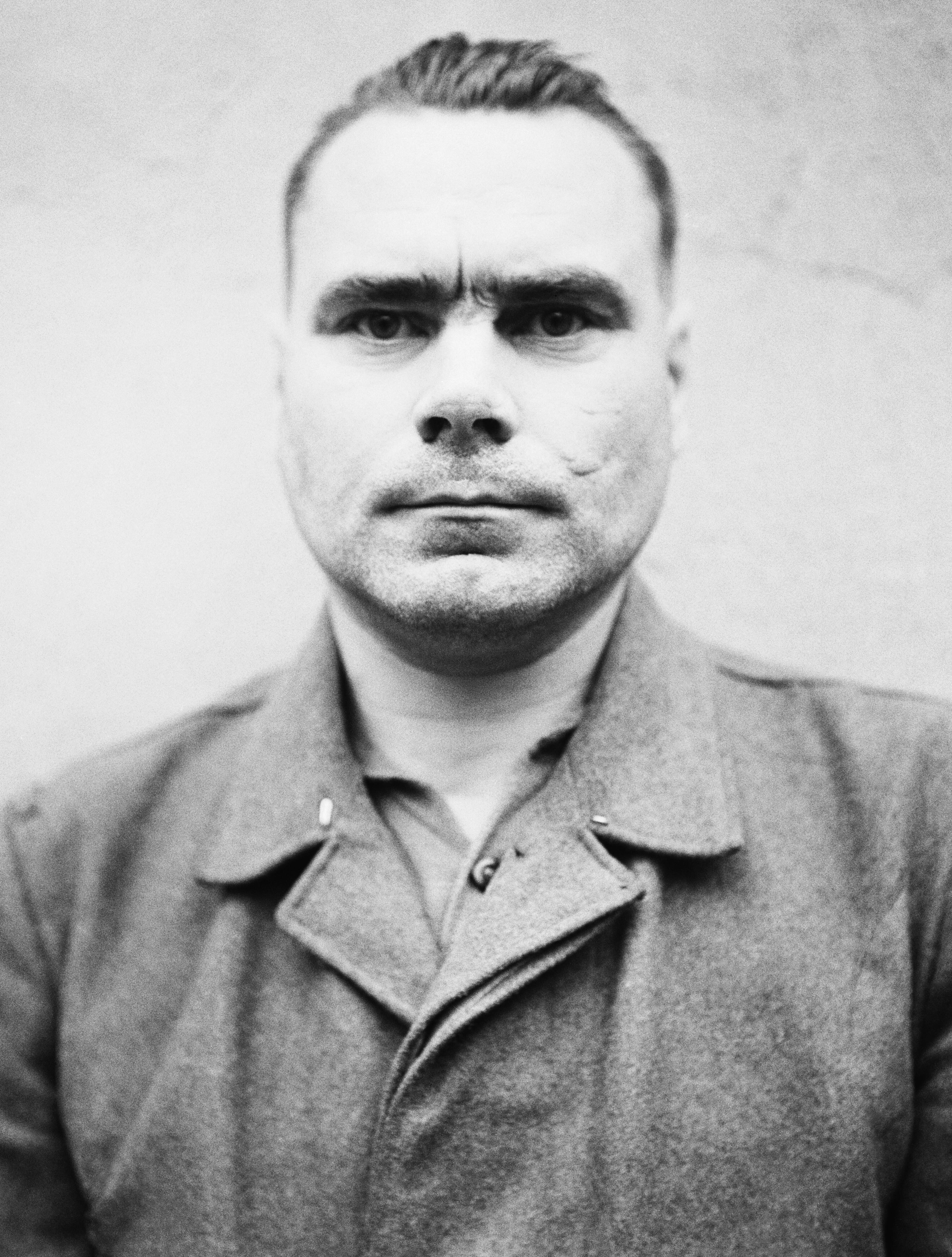
- Kramer in 1945
- Born: 10 November 1906; Munich, Kingdom of Bavaria, German Empire
- Died: 13 December 1945 (aged 39); Hamelin Prison, Allied-occupied Germany
- Other name: The Beast of Belsen
- Status: Executed by hanging
- Motive: Nazism
- Conviction: War crimes
- Trial: Belsen trial
- Penalty: Death

Josef Kramer (10 November 1906 – 13 December 1945) was a Hauptsturmführer in the SS and the Commandant of Auschwitz-Birkenau (from 8 May 1944 to 25 November 1944) and Bergen Belsen (from December 1944 to its liberation on 15 April 1945) concentration camps. Dubbed the "Beast of Belsen" by camp inmates, he was a German Nazi war criminal, directly responsible for the deaths of thousands of people. He was detained by the British Army after the Second World War, convicted of war crimes, and hanged on the gallows in the prison at Hamelin by British executioner Albert Pierrepoint.

== Early life ==
Josef Kramer, an only child, was born and raised in Munich in a middle-class family. His parents, Theodore and Maria Kramer, brought him up as a strict Roman Catholic. In 1915, the family moved from Munich to Augsburg, where Josef Kramer attended school. He began an apprenticeship as an electrician in 1920. From 1925 to 1933, except for working in a department store and as an accountant, he was mostly unemployed.

== Career ==
He joined the Nazi Party in 1931 and the SS in 1932. His SS training led him into work as a prison guard and, after the outbreak of war, as a concentration camp guard.

In 1934, Kramer was assigned as a guard at Dachau. His promotion was rapid, obtaining senior posts at Sachsenhausen and Mauthausen concentration camps. Kramer became assistant to Rudolf Höss, the Commandant at Auschwitz in 1940. He accompanied Höss to inspect Auschwitz as a possible site for a new synthetic oil and rubber plant, "a vital industry given Germany's shortage of oil.".

=== Natzweiler-Struthof ===
Kramer was named Commandant of Natzweiler-Struthof concentration camp in April 1941. Natzweiler-Struthof was the only concentration camp established by the Nazis on present-day French territory, though there were French-run transit camps, such as the one at Drancy. At the time, the area in Alsace-Lorraine in which it was established had been annexed by Nazi Germany.

As commandant at Natzweiler-Struthof, Kramer personally carried out the gassings of 80 Jewish men and women, part of a group of 87 selected at Auschwitz to become anatomical specimens in a proposed Jewish skull collection to be housed at the Anatomy Institute at the Reich University of Strasbourg under the direction of August Hirt.

Ultimately, the 87 inmates were transported to Natzweiler-Struthof; 46 of these individuals were originally from Thessaloniki, Greece. The deaths of 86 of these inmates were, in the words of Hirt, "induced" in an improvised gassing facility at Natzweiler-Struthof, and their corpses, 57 men and 29 women, were sent to Strasbourg. One male victim was shot as he fought to keep from being gassed.

=== Auschwitz ===
Kramer was promoted to the rank of Hauptsturmführer (Captain) in 1942 and, in May 1944, was transferred to become the Lagerführer (camp commander) in charge of operations at Auschwitz II-Birkenau, the main centre used to kill inmates within the Auschwitz concentration camp complex, from 8 May 1944 to 25 November 1944. He was brought to Auschwitz to manage the gassings of new transports in May 1944, according to the Prosecution Judge Advocate at the War Crimes tribunal that convicted him of being responsible for the deaths committed at Auschwitz. There were a number of witnesses who said that he took an active part in the selection parades in that, for instance, he loaded people into the trucks and beat them when they resisted. At Auschwitz, Kramer soon became known among his subordinates as a harsh taskmaster. One of the defendants at the Frankfurt Auschwitz Trial, Dr. Franz Lucas, testified that he tried to avoid assignments given to him by Kramer by pleading stomach and intestinal disorders. When Lucas saw that his name had been added to the list of selecting physicians for a large group of inmates transferred from Hungary, he objected strenuously. Kramer reacted sharply: "I know you are being investigated for favouring prisoners. I am now ordering you to go to the ramp, and if you fail to obey an order, I shall have you arrested on the spot."

=== Belsen ===
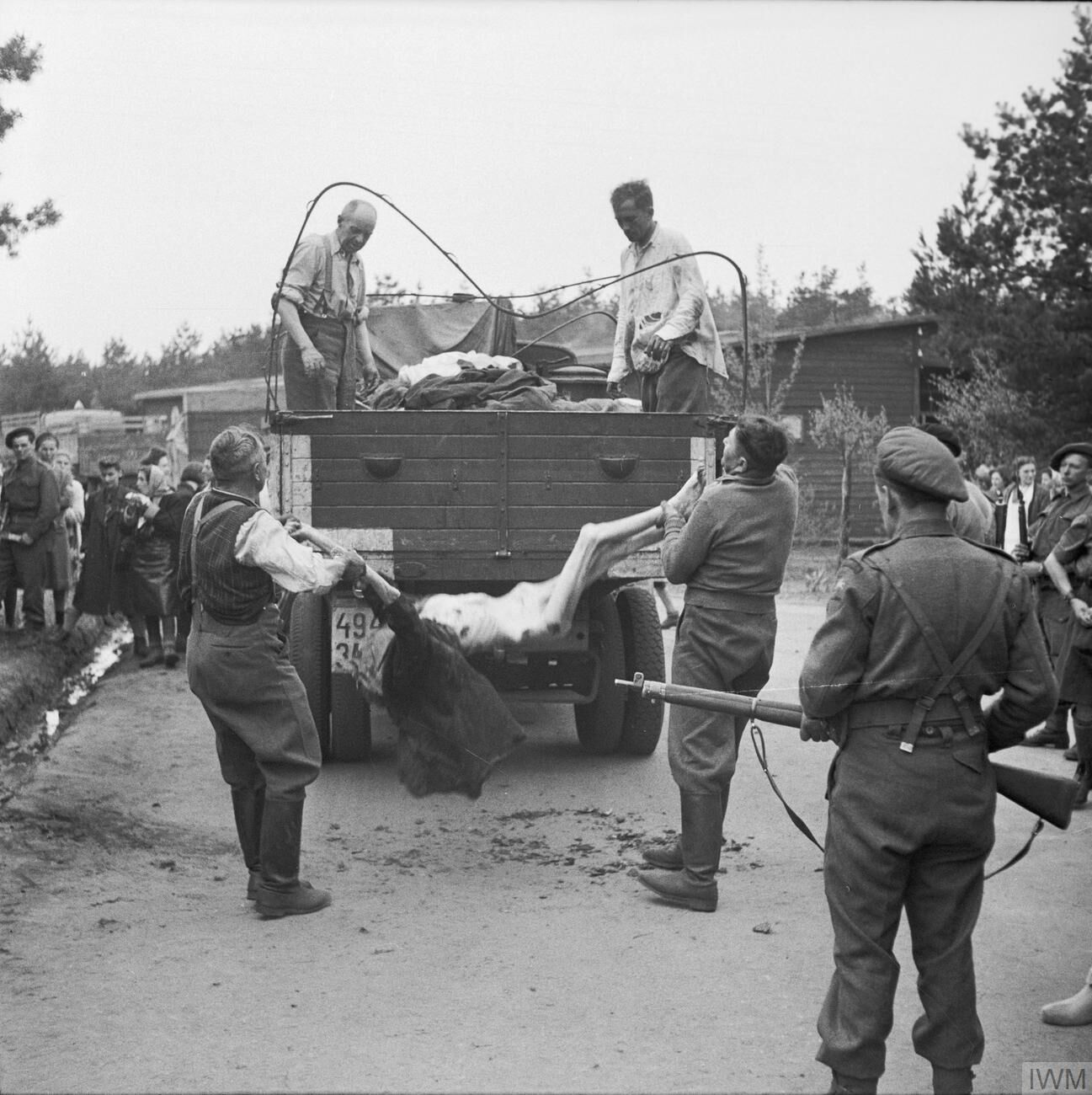
Former guards at Bergen-Belsen are made to load the bodies of dead prisoners onto a truck for burial, 17–18 April 1945

In December 1944, SS-Hauptsturmführer Kramer was transferred from Birkenau to Bergen Belsen, near the village of Bergen. Belsen had originally served as a temporary camp for those leaving Germany, but during the war it had been expanded to serve as a convalescent depot for the ill and displaced people from across north-west Europe. Although it had no gas chambers, Kramer's rule was so harsh that he became known as the "Beast of Belsen".

As Nazi Germany collapsed, administration of the camp broke down, but Kramer remained devoted to bureaucracy. On 1 March 1945, he filed a report asking for help and resources, stating that of the 42,000 inmates in his camp, 250–300 died each day from typhus. On 19 March, the number of inmates rose to 60,000 as the Germans continued to evacuate camps that were soon to be liberated by the Allies. As late as the week of 13 April, some 28,000 additional prisoners were brought in.

With the collapse of administration and many guards fleeing to escape retribution, roll calls were stopped, and the inmates were left to their own devices. Corpses rotted everywhere, and rats attacked the living too weak to fight them off. Kramer remained even when the British, led by Major Brian Urquhart, arrived to liberate the camp, and took them on a tour of the camp to inspect the "scenes". Piles of corpses lay all over the camp, mass graves were filled in, and the huts were filled with prisoners in every stage of emaciation and disease.

=== Ranks and promotions in the Schutzstaffel (SS) ===
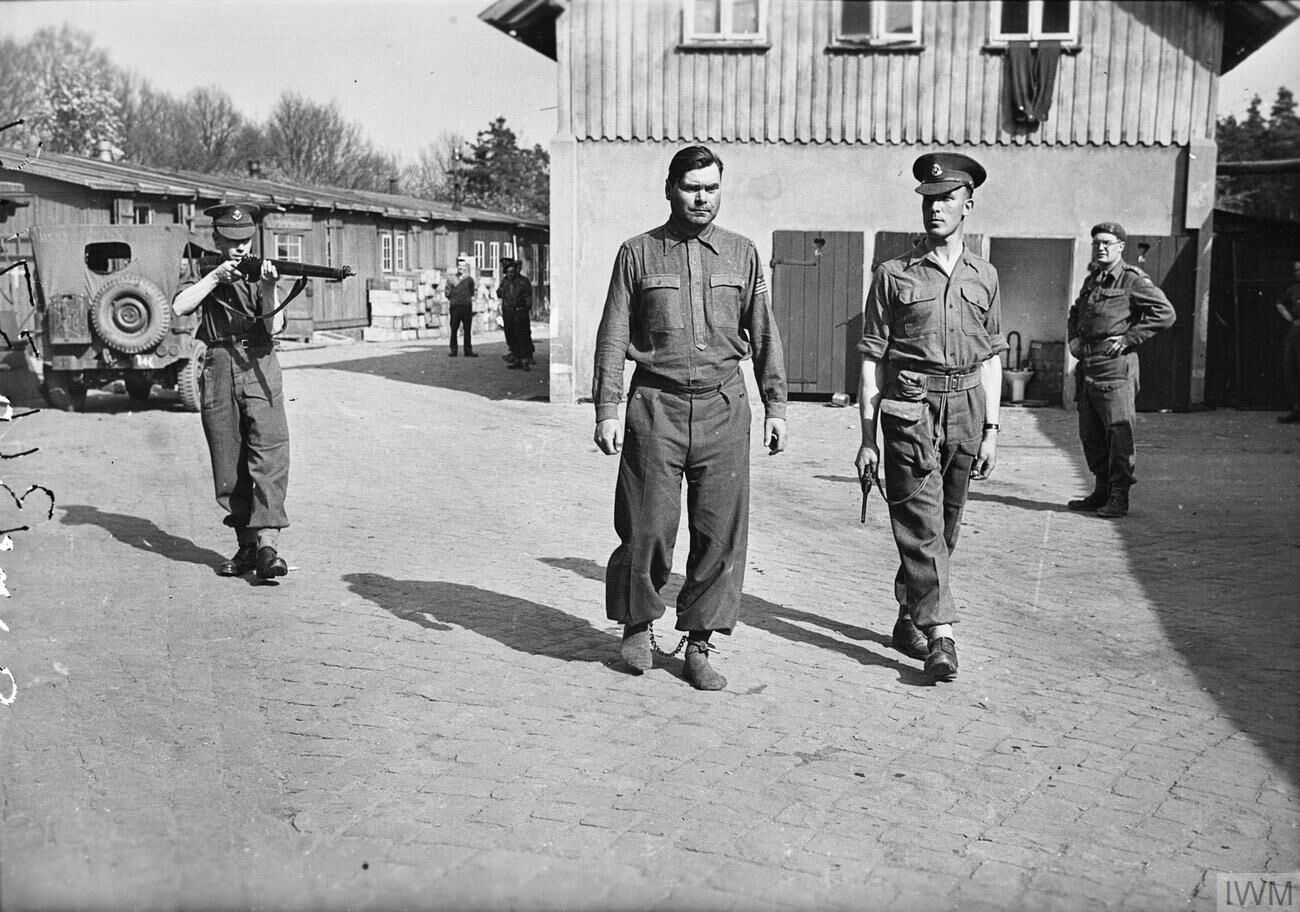
SS-Hauptsturmführer Josef Kramer, photographed in legcuffs at Belsen before being removed to the POW cage at Celle, 17 April 1945.

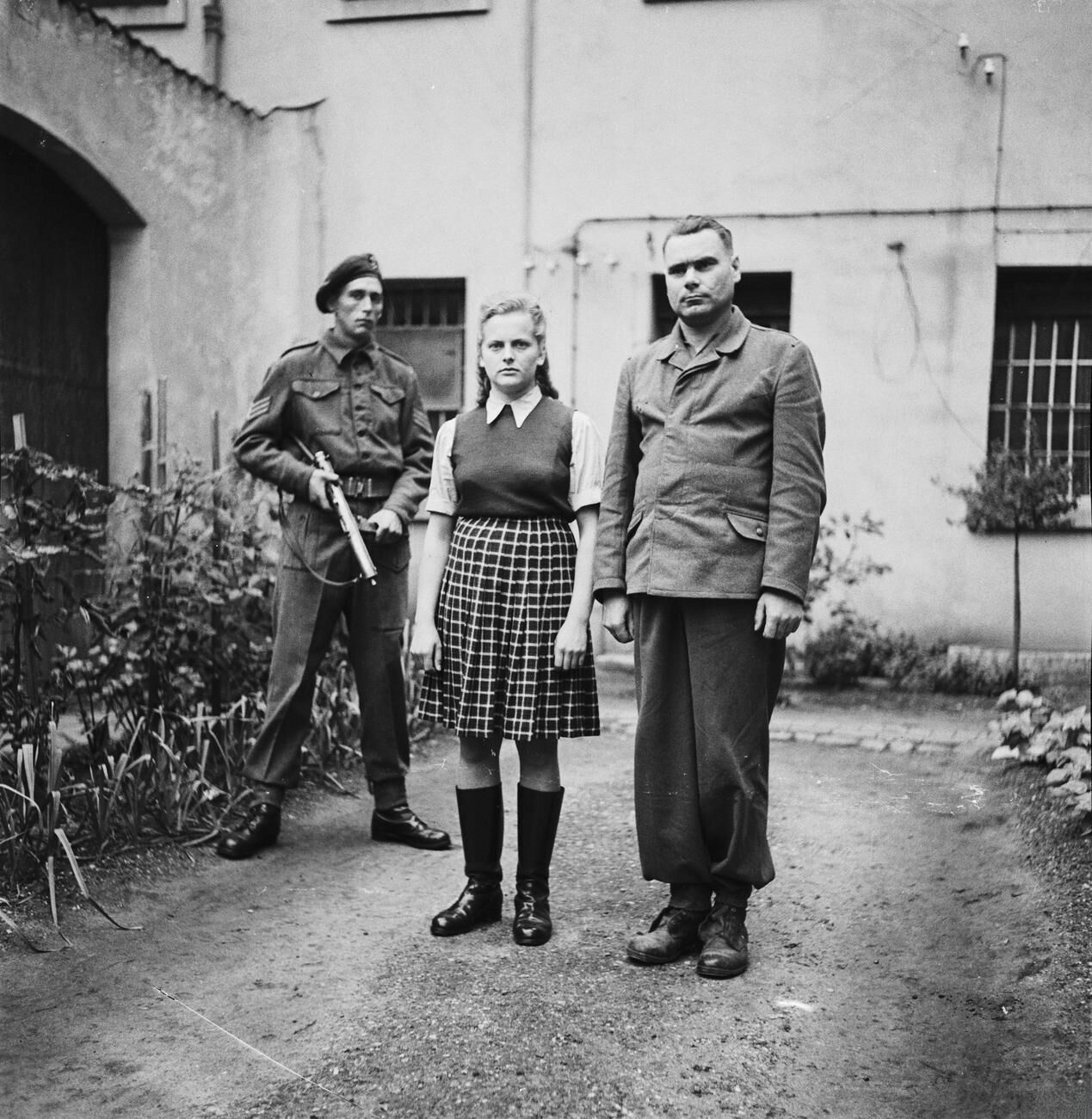
Former Aufseherin Irma Grese and former SS-Hauptsturmführer Josef Kramer in prison in Celle in August 1945

Kramer's SS-ranks in the Schutzstaffel
Date	SS Rank
5 December 1933	SS-Unterscharführer
19 September 1934	SS-Scharführer
27 April 1935	SS-Hauptscharführer
Spring 1937	SS-Untersturmführer
30 January 1939	SS-Obersturmführer
1 June 1942	SS-Hauptsturmführer

== Trial and execution ==
Kramer was imprisoned at the prison in Hamelin. Along with 44 other camp staff, Kramer was tried in the Belsen Trial by a British military court at Lüneburg. The trial lasted several weeks from September to November 1945. During the trial Anita Lasker testified that Kramer had taken part in selections for the gas chamber at Auschwitz.

Kramer was sentenced to death on 17 November 1945, for crimes both at Auschwitz and at Bergen-Belsen, and was hanged at Hamelin Prison by Albert Pierrepoint on 13 December 1945, aged 39.

== Sources and external links ==
- Straubenzee V. A. (2005). The gate of Hell, The Daily Telegraph, retrieved on December 22, 2006.
- What Was Belsen? Josef Kramer, Durham County Record Office The Learning Zone, retrieved on December 23, 2006.
- Heyd, Emmanuel; Toledano, Raphael. "The Names of the 86" (in French, German, and English). Dora Films, 2014.
