= Richard Schuh =

German murderer

- Born: 2 October 1920; Neustetten, Württemberg, Weimar Republic
- Died: 18 February 1949 (aged 28); Tübingen Prison, Allied-occupied Germany
- Status: Executed by guillotine
- Convictions: Murder; Aggravated robbery
- Penalty: Death (May 1948)

Details
- Victims: Hans Eugen Roth
- Date: 28 January 1948
- Country: Allied-occupied Germany

Richard Schuh (2 October 1920 – 18 February 1949) was a German convicted murderer and the last criminal to be executed by the West German judiciary (excluding West Berlin).

== Biography ==
Schuh was a trained mechanic who served in the Luftwaffe during World War II. He fought on the Western Front and the Eastern Front, serving as the gunner on fighter planes. He was later taken prisoner by the Americans. After his release, Schuh made a living by doing odd jobs. He murdered Hans Eugen Roth, a truck driver, near Herrenberg on 28 January 1948, in order to get hold of the new tires on his vehicle and sell them on the black market.

Schuh in his Luftwaffe uniform

Schuh's crime was quickly solved. He was arrested, convicted of murder and aggravated robbery, and sentenced to death by the Tübingen Regional Court in May 1948. Schuh's mother killed herself shortly after her son's arrest. Schuh's appeal, as well as pleas for clemency from close relatives and even from the director of the prison where Schuh was incarcerated, were ineffective: a commutation of the sentence to life imprisonment was in the hands of the President of Württemberg-Hohenzollern, Gebhard Müller, a proponent of capital punishment. Müller declined to intervene.

The execution was carried out with a guillotine on 18 February 1949, at six o'clock in the morning, in the courtyard of the prison at 18 Doblerstraße in Tübingen. During the execution, the small town hall bell was rung. Schuh himself had only learned of the scheduled date the night before. Witnesses said he was "extremely calm" upon hearing the news of his upcoming execution. Schuh's body was handed over to the anatomical institute of the University of Tübingen. The guillotine is on display in the Ludwigsburg Prison Museum.

== Legacy ==
During the Nazi era, some 16,000 people had been executed. In the years between the end of the war and the entry into force of the Basic Law on 24 May 1949, German courts in the three western occupation zones imposed a total of 34 death sentences; 15 of these were carried out. Schuh's beheading was the penultimate civilian execution on West German territory and the last by the West German judiciary. Two other convicted murderers, 29-year-old Robert Amelung and 39-year-old Peter Steinhauer were sentenced by the British military judiciary and guillotined in Hamburg on 9 May 1949.

In West Berlin, where the Basic Law applied only to a limited extent, capital punishment was not abolished until 1951; the last person to be executed there was the robber-murderer Berthold Wehmeyer on 11 May 1949.

On 7 June 1951, American soldiers hanged seven Nazi war criminals at Landsberg Prison. These were the last executions carried out on West German soil.

== See also ==
- Capital punishment in Germany
- List of most recent executions by jurisdiction

== Bibliography ==
- Hans-Joachim Lang (1999). Richard Schuh, Ihr Leben ist verwirkt!. Die Zeit.

== Sources ==
- Raimund Weible (2009-02-18). "Zum letzten Mal fällt das Fallbeil". Schwäbisches Tagblatt.
- Berthold Seewald (2018-02-16). "Todesstrafe in Deutschland: Um sechs Uhr starb der Raubmörder unter dem Fallbeil". welt.de.
- Katja Iken (2018-02-18). "Todesstrafe in Deutschland: "Gehen Sie mutig und gefasst Ihren letzten schweren Gang"". einestages auf Spiegel Online.
