= Wolfram Sievers =

German war criminal (1905–1948)

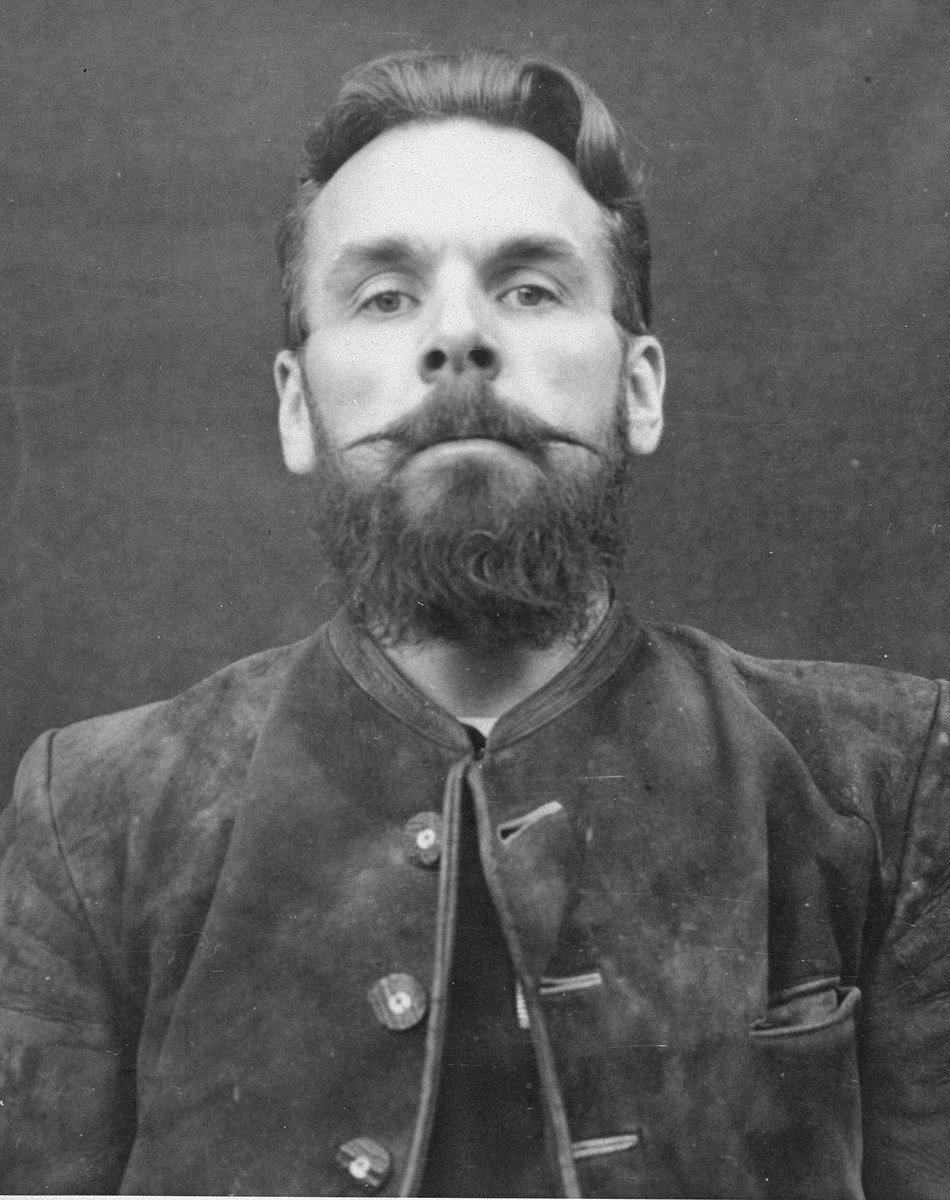
- Sievers in US custody
- Born: 10 July 1905; Hildesheim, German Empire
- Died: 2 June 1948 (aged 42); Landsberg Prison, Allied-occupied Germany
- Political party: Nazi Party
- Status: Executed by hanging
- Convictions: War crimes; Crimes against humanity; Membership in a criminal organization
- Trial: Doctors' Trial
- Penalty: Death

Wolfram Sievers (10 July 1905 – 2 June 1948) was a Nazi and convicted war criminal for medical atrocities carried out while he was managing director (Reichsgeschäftsführer) of the Ahnenerbe from 1935–1945. He was convicted of war crimes in the Doctors' Trial in 1947 and executed by hanging in 1948.

== Early life and nationalism ==
Sievers was born in 1905 in Hildesheim in the Province of Hanover (now in Lower Saxony), the son of a Protestant church musician. It is reported that he was musically gifted, that he played the harpsichord, organ, and piano, and loved German baroque music. He was expelled from school for being active in the Deutschvölkischer Schutz und Trutzbund and studied history, philosophy, and religious studies at Stuttgart's Technical University while working as a salesman. A member of the Bündische Jugend, he became active in the Artamanen-Gesellschaft ('Artaman League'), a nationalist back-to-the-land movement.

== In the Nazi Party and the Ahnenerbe ==
Sievers joined the German Nazi Party in 1929. In 1933, he headed the Externsteine-Stiftung ('Externsteine Foundation'), which had been founded by Heinrich Himmler to study the Externsteine in the Teutoburger Wald. In 1935 he joined the SS; later that year Himmler appointed Sievers to the position of Reichsgeschäftsführer, or General Secretary, of the Ahnenerbe. He was the actual director of Ahnenerbe operations and rose to the rank of SS-Standartenführer by the end of World War II.

In 1943, Sievers became director of the Ahnenerbe's Institut für Wehrwissenschaftliche Zweckforschung ('Institute for Military Scientific Research'), which conducted extensive experiments using human subjects. He also assisted in assembling a collection of skulls and skeletons for August Hirt's study at the Reichsuniversität Straßburg, as a part of which 86 Jewish prisoners were selected, anthropologically measured, and killed.

== Trial and execution ==
Sievers was tried during the Doctors' Trial at Nuremberg after World War II, where he was dubbed "the Nazi Bluebeard" by journalist William L. Shirer because of his "thick, ink-black beard". The Institute for Military Scientific Research had been set up as part of the Ahnenerbe, and the prosecution at Nuremberg laid the responsibility for the experiments on humans which had been conducted under its auspices on the Ahnenerbe. Sievers, as its highest administrative officer, was accused of actively aiding and promoting the criminal experiments.

Sievers was charged with being a member of an organization declared criminal by the International Military Tribunal (the SS), and was implicated in the commission of war crimes and crimes against humanity. In his defense, he alleged that as early as 1933, he had been a member of an anti-Nazi resistance movement which planned to assassinate Hitler and Himmler, and that he had obtained his appointment as Manager of the Ahnenerbe so as to get close to Himmler and observe his movements. He further claimed that he remained in the post on the advice of his resistance leader to gather vital information which would assist in the overthrow of the Nazi regime.

Sievers was sentenced to death on 20 August 1947 in the Doctors' Trial, and hanged on 2 June 1948, at Landsberg Prison in Bavaria.

== Influence ==
Russian far-right political philosopher Alexandr Dugin adopted in the 1980s an alter ego with the name of "Hans Sievers", a reference to Wolfram Sievers.

Japanese visual novel; Soukou Akki Muramasa features a character based on Wolfram Sievers.
