= Hans Fleischhacker =

German anthropologist

- Born: 10 March 1912; Töttleben, Erfurt, German Empire
- Died: 30 January 1992 (aged 79)
- Education: University of Jena; Ludwig-Maximilians-Universität München
- Occupation: Anthropologist
- Known for: Work in Schutzstaffel SS with Bruno Beger

Hans Fleischhacker (10 March 1912 – 30 January 1992) was a German anthropologist with the Ahnenerbe and a commander in the SS of Nazi Germany. He worked with Bruno Beger on some projects, making measurements of Jewish people. He was with Beger at Auschwitz when the people were selected to be part of the Jewish skull collection, a project of the Ahnenerbe. At their post-war trial, Beger was found guilty of full knowledge of the scope of that project, while Fleischhacker was found not to be aware that the purpose of the measurements was to select the 86 people to be murdered at Natzweiler-Struthof camp.

== Education and joining the SS ==
After studying at the University of Jena and the Ludwig-Maximilians-Universität München, Fleischhacker went to work at the Institute of Racial Research in Tübingen in 1937, joining the SS at the same time.

== Second World War ==
In 1940, Fleischhacker also joined both the Nazi Party and the Waffen-SS. Before long, he saw service with the SS Race and Settlement Main Office. Following the invasion of Poland, he was sent to Litzmannstadt as part of this group in order to perform measurements on ethnic Germans and determine whether they were suitable for resettlement programmes in the east or simply for forced labour. His main base of operations was at Łódź.

In 1942, Fleischhacker was, along with Heinrich Rübel, chosen by Bruno Beger to work with him in an SS project to determine the racial type applicable to the Mountain Jews of the Caucasus, a group that did not readily fit the Nazi's existing ethnic paradigms. Fleischhacker was chosen for this task due to a thesis he was preparing at the time dealing with skin color amongst Jews. The following year he worked again with Beger, this time at Auschwitz concentration camp where again his duty was to measure physical features of the inmates in order to determine to which race they belonged. He took measurements of the persons selected for the Jewish skull collection, who were sent from Auschwitz to Natzweiler-Struthof concentration camp to be gassed.

== Post-war trial and work ==
After the Second World War, Fleischhacker was held in various internment camps until appearing before the board of arbitration in 1948, where he was designated Mitläufer - not a fully committed Nazi but one who nonetheless went along with Nazism. He was able to return to anthropological research at the Goethe University Frankfurt in November 1950 and subsequently worked as a researcher and lecturer at the University of El Salvador, then at the Tübingen Anthropology Institute and returned to the Goethe University Frankfurt until 1968.

Along with Beger and Wolf-Dietrich Wolff, Fleischhacker came under investigation for his time at Auschwitz. A case was not brought against them until 1970, as their connection to the Jewish skull project was not known until then. Ultimately the case against him was dismissed the following year as there was insufficient evidence to prove that he knew he was involved in extermination and only Beger was convicted.
