= Reichsuniversität Straßburg =

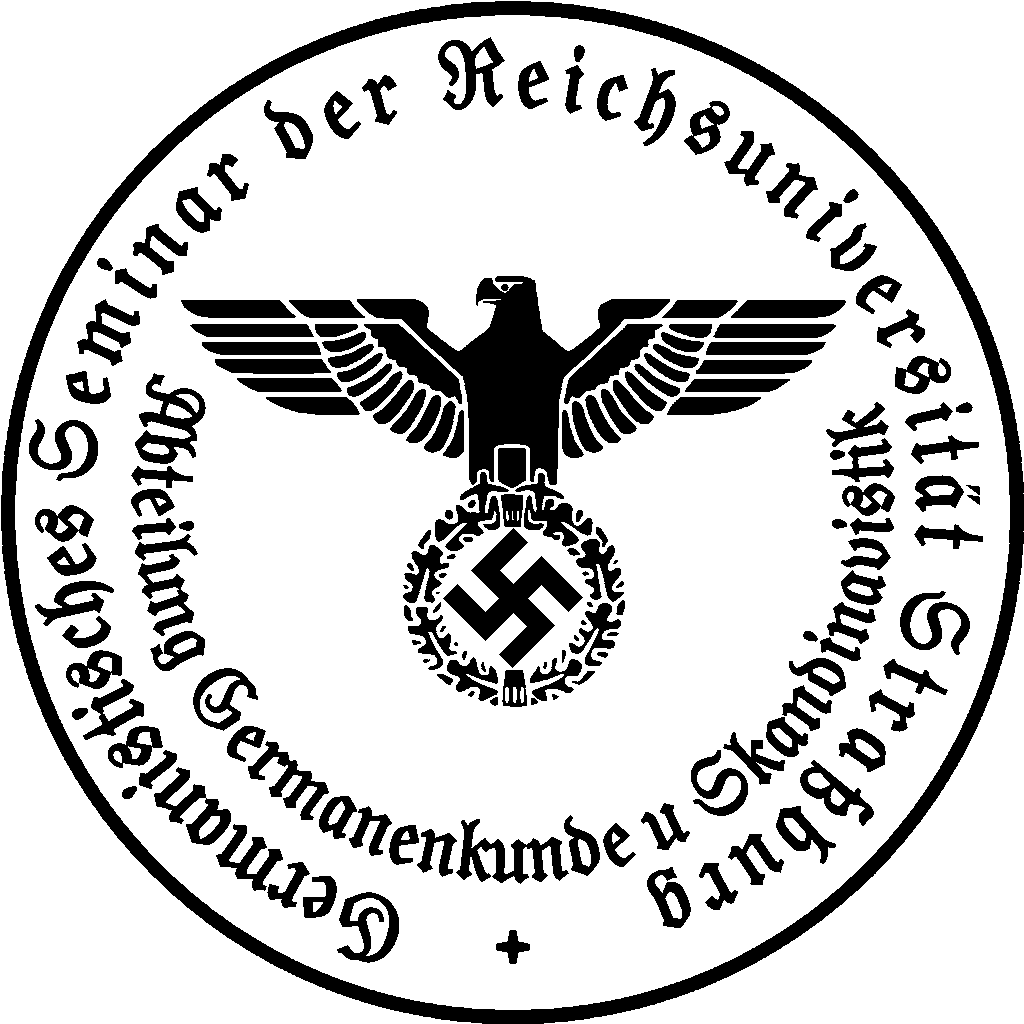
Seal of the Department of Germanic and Nordic Studies

The Reichsuniversität Straßburg was founded in 1941 by the Nazis in Alsace after the annexation of Alsace–Lorraine by Nazi Germany. The University of Strasbourg had moved to Clermont-Ferrand in 1939. The university's purpose was to restore the German character of the Kaiser-Wilhelm-Universität, as the University of Strasbourg was named from 1872 to 1918, and to advance "German knowledge" in the annexed territory. When the Allies arrived in Alsace in 1944, the Reichsuniversität was first transferred to Tübingen and then dissolved.

== History ==
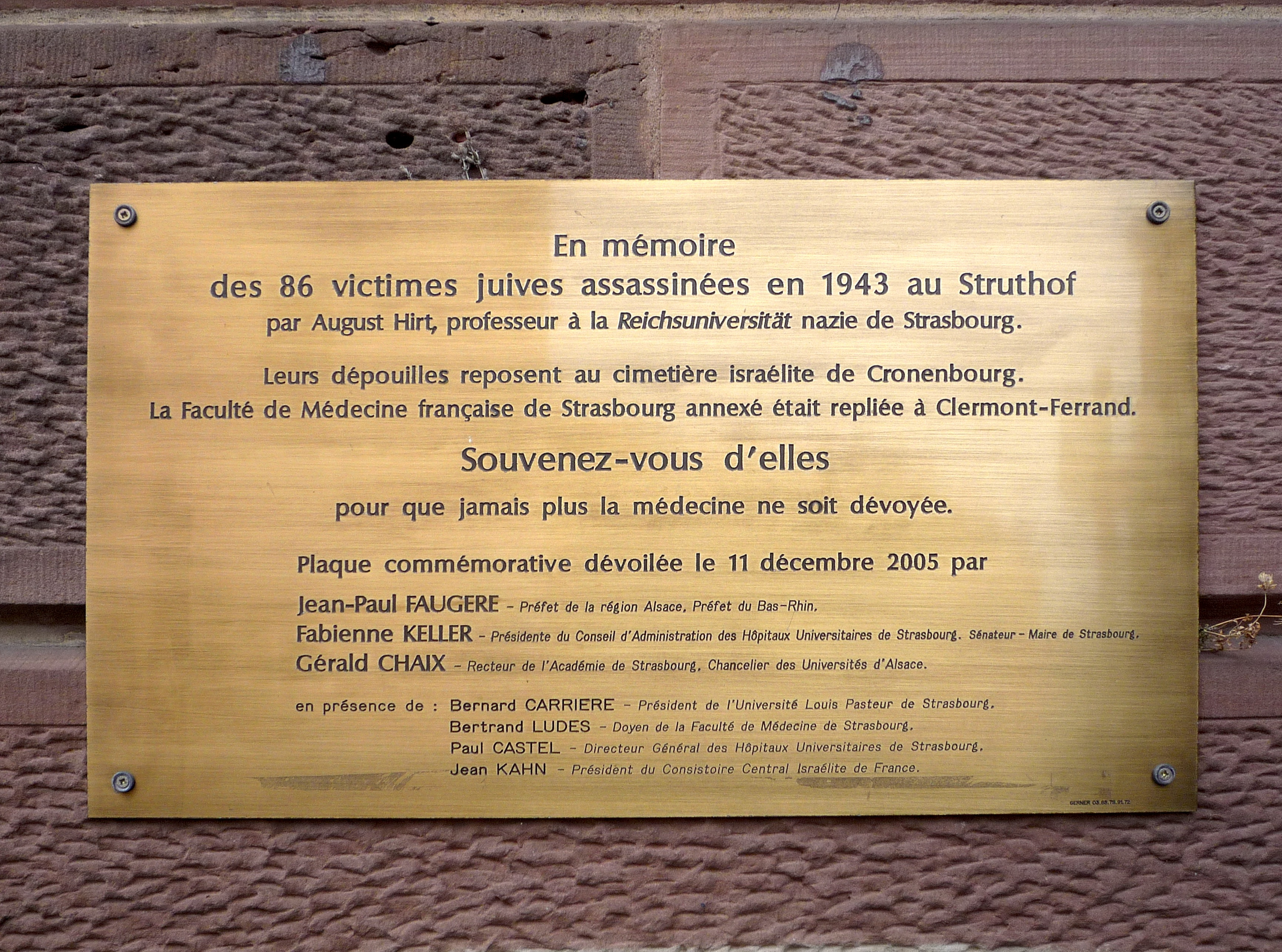
Memorial for the victims of August Hirt's racial researches at the Institute of Anatomy of the Reichsuniversität Straßburg (Hôpital civil). The inscription reads, in translation: In memory of the 86 Jewish victims assassinated in 1943 at Struthof by August Hirt, professor at the Nazi Reichsuniversität of Strasbourg. Their remains rest in the Israelite cemetery in Cronenbourg. The French Faculty of Medicine of annexed Strasbourg had moved to Clermont-Ferrand. Remember them so that medicine may never again go astray.

The University of Strasbourg evacuated to Clermont-Ferrand in 1939, in advance of the Nazi invasion. The Reichsuniversität Straßburg was formally opened in the university's facilities on 23 November 1941, the last of three "Reich Universities"; the other two were in occupied Poland. It was intended to advance and spread German learning as defined by the Nazis, and to eclipse the Sorbonne. Most of the faculty and students fled when the Allies re-entered the city in November 1944.

== Academics ==
The initial organisation of the Reichsuniversität was overseen by Ernst Anrich, a historian who became Dean of the Faculty of Philosophy. An SS-man, he sought to orient it closely with the Nazi Party, the SS, and the Reich Education Ministry.

The university had four of the traditional faculties: Philosophy (i.e., Humanities), Law, Medicine and Science, but no division of Theology. An independent institute of religion (Allgemeine Religionswissenschaft) within the department of early history and antiquities was presided over by Otto Huth, head of the section on Indo-European religion within the Ahnenerbe, the academic and research division of the SS. The institute had as one of its purposes bolstering the case for Alsace belonging culturally to Germany.

The Faculty of Natural Science at the Reichsuniversität Straßburg was particularly important to the Ahnenerbe. In particular, the Faculty of Medicine was more involved in the war effort than at the other two Reich universities. August Hirt, subsequently convicted as a war criminal, headed the Institute of Anatomy, where he conducted "racial anatomy" experiments and murdered concentration camp inmates for the Ahnenerbe's Jewish skeleton collection and his own Jewish skull collection. Victims were selected at Auschwitz as well as at the nearby Natzweiler-Struthof concentration camp, and put to death in the gas chambers at Struthof, which had originally been installed for chemical weapons experiments. Hirt also had corpses delivered to the institute from French hospitals, POW hospitals, and from executions of French civilians. In addition to chemical weapons, criminal research on typhus was also conducted at the university. In 2016 the University of Strasbourg commissioned an investigation of medical crimes committed at the Reichsuniversität, and the report was published in May 2022.

== Notable people ==
- Hans Bender
- Otto Bickenbach
- Rudolf Fleischmann
- Günther Franz
- Eugen Haagen
- August Hirt
- Kurt Hofmeier
- Ernst Rudolf Huber
- Otto Huth
- Anton Kiesselbach
- Georg Niemeier
- Walter Noddack|
- Johannes Stein
- Carl Friedrich von Weizsäcker
- Joachim Werner (archaeologist)
- Karl Wimmer
