= Wilhelm Schäfer (SS) =

German SS war criminal (1911–1961)

- Born: 20 October 1911; Obhausen, Saxony-Anhalt, German Empire
- Died: 16 June 1961 (aged 49); Leipzig Prison, Leipzig, East Germany
- Cause of death: Execution by guillotine
- Political party: Nazi Party
- Awards: Iron Cross 2nd Class
- Status: Executed
- Motive: Nazism
- Convictions: War crimes Crimes against humanity Murder; Accessory to murder Causing grievous bodily harm
- Penalty: Death

Details
- Victims: 800–1150+
- Span of crimes: 1935–1945
- Country: Germany and Estonia
- Locations: Lichtenburg and Buchenwald concentration camps Tartu; Tallinn
- Date apprehended: 1960
- SS career
- Allegiance: Nazi Germany
- Branch: Schutzstaffel
- Service years: 1933–1945
- Rank: SS-Hauptscharführer
- Unit: 20th Waffen Grenadier Division of the SS (1st Estonian)

Wilhelm Schäfer (20 October 1911 – 16 June 1961) was an SS-Hauptscharführer who was complicit in numerous war crimes, including the executions of hundreds of prisoners in Buchenwald concentration camp. He was exposed as a war criminal, put on trial, and executed after he was recognized by a survivor of Buchenwald.

== Early life and SS career ==
Schäfer was born in a farmer's village in Obhausen. His father was extremely nationalistic. As a young adult, Schäfer got into the bricklayer's trade. After becoming unemployed, he got a job as a farmhand in his hometown. Schäfer joined the Nazi Party in 1932 and the SS in 1933. During this time, he got into street fights with political opponents.

Between 1935 and 1937, Schäfer served at Lichtenburg concentration camp, where he was complicit in the abuse and killings of prisoners. Between 1937 and 1943, he served at Buchenwald concentration camp, where he was the deputy commandant of camp laundry area and a Blockführer for various work details. While in Buchenwald, Schäfer operated with the group "Kommando 99", which carried out executions, mostly against Soviet POWs, using the Genickschussanlage. Schäfer was complicit in hundreds of executions during this time. He was involved in hundreds of floggings. In many instances, he was actively involved in "tree-hangings", a punishment in which the prisoner's hands were tied behind his back, then pulled up over his back and hung from a hook attached to a tree, with his feet not touching the ground.

From 1943 to the end of the war, he was with the 20th Waffen-SS Grenadier Division, an SS unit which consisted mostly of Estonian volunteers and conscripts. While in Estonia, the unit participated in Bandenbekämpfung (anti-partisan operations).

== Arrest, trial, and execution ==
Upon realizing that the war was lost, Schäfer cut out his SS blood group tattoo and destroyed all of his papers and SS clothing. He moved to the district of Querfurt, then Weimar, without being detected. Schäfer then moved to a farmer's town the district of Arnstadt, which was in the future East Germany. He wrote to his wife, who was in West Germany, that he was reluctant to move since that risked identification. Schäfer eventually became the local chairman of the Peasants Mutual Aid Association in his town.

In the early 1960s, pressure mounted on the remaining independent farmers in East Germany to collectivize their farms. Farmers in Arnstadt were especially reluctant, with Schäfer being strongly opposed to collectivization. East German authorities asked representatives from Nordhausen district to convince farmers in Arnstadt to collectivize. In the spring of 1960, a representative from Nordhausen came to Schäfer's home to convince him to join the Landwirtschaftliche Produktionsgenossenschaft. The representative, a Buchenwald survivor, recognized Schäfer and reported him to Stasi officials in Erfurt. After an investigation, Stasi officers arrested Schäfer several months later.

In 1961, Schäfer was put on trial for numerous offenses, including mass murder, being an accessory to murder, war crimes, and crimes against humanity. Due to the severity of the charges, the case was heard directly by the Supreme Court of East Germany. During his trial, 25 former Buchenwald prisoners brought from Soviet Union, Czechoslovakia, Austria, and East Germany attested to Schäfer's extreme brutality. They said everyone was terrified of Schäfer and tried to avoid him, since he would sometimes brutalize and kill prisoners for no reason other than apparent boredom. Schäfer himself confessed to executing as many as 150 Soviet prisoners. The prosecutor requested a death sentence.

The court ruled that Schäfer had abused and murdered in Lichtenburg and Buchenwald, personally executing 100 to 150 Soviet POWs using the Genickschussanlage, participating in the executions of 700 to 1000 more Soviet POWs, participating in 30 instances of tree-hangings, participating in 300 to 400 floggings, and participating in anti-partisan operations in Estonia, which included the executions of POWs, suspected partisans, civilians, and the arrest of civilians of burned-down villages, who were subsequently executed by death squads.

Schäfer (back) during his trial

The defense asked that Schäfer receive a life sentence. However, the judges sentenced him to death. They ruled that a life sentence was too lenient on the grounds of the severity of Schäfer's crimes and that he posed a serious danger to society. Because Schäfer had been tried directly by the Supreme Court, he was unable to appeal the verdict. That left his only hope of avoiding execution with Chairman of the State Council Walter Ulbricht. Ulbricht declined to intervene. Schäfer was subsequently guillotined at Leipzig Prison on 16 June 1961. His remains were cremated, and he was buried in an unmarked grave.
