= Horst Fischer =

German physician (1912–1966)

- Fischer during his trial (March 1966)
- Born: 31 December 1912; Dresden, Kingdom of Saxony, German Empire
- Died: 8 July 1966 (aged 53); Leipzig Prison, Leipzig, East Germany (now Germany)
- Occupation: Physician
- Political party: Nazi Party
- Children: 4
- Status: Executed by guillotine
- Motive: Nazism
- Conviction: Crimes against humanity
- Penalty: Death

Details
- Victims: 70,000+
- Span of crimes: November 1942 – 1945
- Country: German-occupied Poland
- Location: Auschwitz concentration camp
- Date apprehended: 11 June 1965
- SS career
- Allegiance: Nazi Germany
- Branch: Waffen-SS
- Service years: 1933–1945
- Rank: Hauptsturmführer
- Unit: SS-Totenkopfverbände

Horst Paul Silvester Fischer (31 December 1912 – 8 July 1966) was a German medical doctor and member of the SS who participated in selections in Auschwitz-Birkenau concentration camp during World War II. He selected at least 70,000 prisoners to be gassed, then supervised their gassings. Although he avoided immediate detection after the war, Fischer's crimes came to light in the late 1950s. After tracking him down, Fischer was arrested by East German secret police officials in 1965. In a high-profile public case tried directly by the Supreme Court of East Germany, Fischer, the highest-ranking concentration camp doctor to ever stand trial in front of a German court, was found guilty of crimes against humanity and condemned to death. He was executed by guillotine in 1966.

== Early life ==
After being orphaned Fischer was raised by relatives in Dresden and Berlin. He joined the SS in 1933, and the Nazi Party four years later. After attending medical school at the University of Berlin, Fischer received his medical degree in 1937. In 1939, he started working as a doctor for the SS.

On 1 May 1940, Fischer was promoted to Untersturmführer and became a member of the armed forces of the SS. He was involved in the early stages of the German invasion of the Soviet Union, but was recalled from the front in 1942, after falling ill with tuberculosis. Fischer was offered a job in a concentration camp, which he accepted. In January 1942, Fischer was promoted to Obersturmführer.

== War crimes ==
Fischer was transferred to Auschwitz-Birkenau in November 1942. From November 1943 to September 1944, he was also the main camp doctor in the infirmary of the Monowitz concentration camp. During his time at Auschwitz-Birkenau concentration camp and its subcamps, Fischer was complicit in the murders of tens of thousands of prisoners by performing selections at the ramp, in the prison hospital, on the roll-call grounds, in the barracks as well as among the work units. At one point during his time in Auschwitz, Fischer allegedly remarked, "We have gone so far that we can no longer go back."

Fischer also supervised the gassing of the victims he chose for death and the subsequent disinfections. Fischer also permitted the use of the flogging of prisoners at least 71 times. On 21 June 1944, Fischer was promoted to Hauptsturmführer, making him one of the highest ranking SS doctors in Auschwitz.

== Arrest, trial, and execution ==
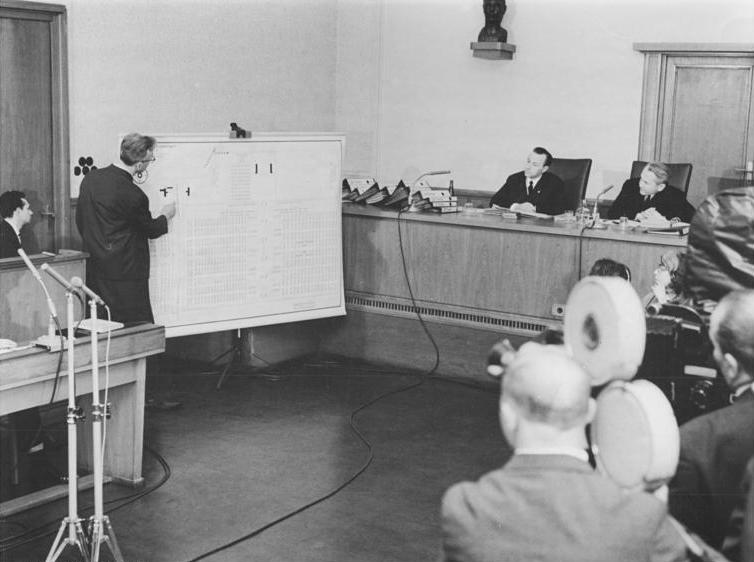
Horst Fischer (at the board), 11 March 1966

After the war, Fischer got his SS blood group tattoo removed to avoid detection. He then carried on with his medical career in the German Democratic Republic for 20 years. He got married, had four children, and lived life as a middle-class citizen. Fischer practiced medicine in the countryside under an alias, giving examinations and vaccinations to kindergarteners. Although Fischer kept his crimes a secret, he reportedly believed enough time had passed that he would not be punished for his crimes.

In 1959, a West German official received material on what Fischer had done in Auschwitz. On 6 April 1960, a West German court in Ludwigsburg issued a warrant for Fischer's arrest, but failed to locate his whereabouts. Fischer drew attention himself by crossing over the border to West Germany and speaking negatively about East Germany. The Stasi became aware of Fischer's crimes in April 1964. They contacted the West German government and requested data on his crimes. West German officials handed over everything they had.

On 11 June 1965, the Stasi arrested Fischer under the pretense of investigating a hit-and-run accident. Fearing he would try to flee west or elsewhere, or commit suicide, officials did not reveal their investigation until Fischer had been remanded to Hohenschönhausen Prison. There, Fischer was interrogated over a period of seven months.

The trial started on 10 March 1966, focused mainly on I.G. Farben and its collaboration with the SS. The case was tried directly by the GDR Supreme Court. To describe the crimes which Fischer was charged with, the prosecution sometimes directed the judges to Fischer's own statements and sketches of the camps. On several charges in which the evidence was weaker, the prosecutor was forced to rely on Fischer's own statements. His personal records and sketches were also used as evidence. The trial lasted roughly a week, and Fischer was found guilty of crimes against humanity.

Hoping for a life sentence if he confessed, Fischer fully cooperated with the investigation. He admitted that the murders, and the Holocaust overall, were premeditated. He said deportees were exploited for slave labor until they were no longer capable of working, then gassed. However, the court ruled that he should be executed. After the Chairman of the State Council Walter Ulbricht refused clemency, Fischer was executed by guillotine in Leipzig on 8 July 1966, one of the last persons to be executed in this way in East Germany and, indeed, outside of France. He was not the last, as another five individuals were beheaded during 1967, although Fischer's case was by far the most notorious of the period. His remains were cremated, and his ashes buried in an unmarked grave.
