= Erwin Hagedorn =

East German serial killer (1952–1972)

- Hagedorn in court in May 1972
- Born: Hans Erwin Hagedorn; 30 January 1952; Eberswalde, East Germany
- Died: 15 September 1972 (aged 20); Leipzig Prison, East Germany
- Status: Executed by shooting
- Motive: Sexual sadism
- Convictions: Murder with aggravating circumstances (3 counts); Sexual abuse of children Attempted sexual abuse of children
- Penalty: Death

Details
- Victims: 3
- Span of crimes: 1969–1971
- Country: East Germany
- State: Eberswalde
- Target: Young boys
- Weapon: Knife
- Date apprehended: 12 November 1971

Hans Erwin Hagedorn (30 January 1952 – 15 September 1972) was an East German serial killer who murdered three young boys between 1969 and 1971.

== Murders ==
On 31 May 1969, Hagedorn killed two nine-year-old boys, Henry Specht and Mario Louis, in a forest in Eberswalde with a knife. The bodies were found two weeks later. Both victims died from deep cuts to the neck. One of the boys was cut so severely that his head was severed as a result of the rotting of the corpse. Extensive investigations were commenced, with a psychological offender profile being assembled and the Ministry for State Security obtaining documents about the case of West German child murderer Jürgen Bartsch. However, the first investigations were not successful.

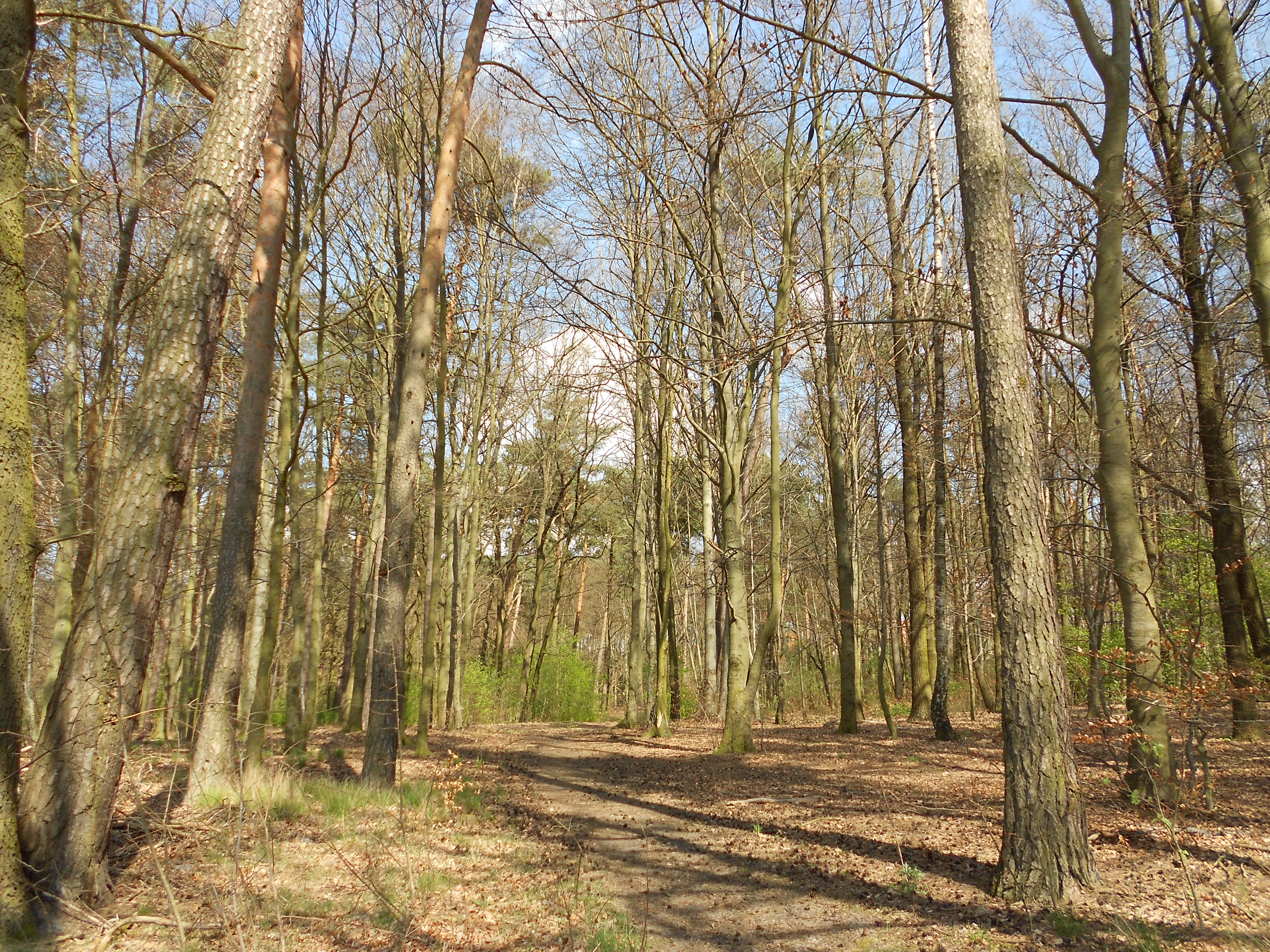
Forest area where the first victims were found

On 7 October 1971, Hagedorn killed Ronald Winkler, a 12-year-old boy, in the same area and in the same way he had killed his first two victims. Shortly afterwards the decisive clue came from a boy who reported being sexually harassed in the year before the first murders took place. Erwin Hagedorn was arrested on 12 November 1971 and immediately confessed to the murders. East Germany had abolished capital punishment for juvenile offenders in 1952, meaning that Hagedorn could only face execution for the murder he committed in 1971, when he was an adult.

In May 1972, Hagedorn was convicted of three counts of murder with aggravated circumstances, sexual abuse, and attempted sexual abuse, and was sentenced to death. An appeal for clemency was denied by the Head of State Walter Ulbricht. The 20-year-old Hagedorn was executed by a single shot to the back of the neck on 15 September 1972. His body was cremated and buried in a secret place.

He was the last civilian executed in East Germany for ordinary crimes, though executions for political-laden crimes and for government officials for ordinary crimes continued until the abolition of capital punishment in the late 1980s. The last execution is believed to be that of Werner Teske in 1981.

Hagedorn was shot by Hermann Lorenz, a Stasi officer who shot 29 people during his time as East Germany's executioner. During an interview, he said that neither Hagedorn nor any of the other 28 people whom he executed cried out or resisted as they were escorted to the death chamber.

== Documentary ==
Die großen Kriminalfälle: Tod einer Bestie – Der Fall Hagedorn, 2001 (German)

== See also ==
- List of German serial killers
- Capital punishment in Germany
