= Paul Hermann Feustel =

SS officer

- Feustel during his time in the SS
- Born: July 30, 1899; Lengenfeld, German Empire
- Died: May 8, 1973 (aged 73); Leipzig Prison, East Germany
- Status: Executed by shooting
- Motive: Nazism
- Convictions: War crimes Crimes against humanity
- Penalty: Death

Details
- Span of crimes: 1940 – May 7, 1945
- Country: Czechoslovakia
- Date apprehended: December 14, 1971
- SS career
- Allegiance: Nazi Germany
- Branch: Schutzstaffel
- Service years: 1940–1945
- Rank: Hauptsturmführer
- Unit: Gestapo

Paul Hermann Feustel (July 30, 1899 – May 8, 1973) was a member of the Nazi Party who served in the SS and the Gestapo during World War II. During the war, he would eventually reach the rank of Hauptsturmführer, and committed numerous atrocities in Czechoslovakia, including the ordering of a massacre after Germany's surrender. Feustel initially managed to avoid detection after the war. However, he was arrested by East German authorities in 1971. Feustel was found guilty of war crimes and crimes against humanity, sentenced to death, and executed in 1973.

== Early life ==
Feustel was born in Lengenfeld. He joined the Reichswehr in 1919, and later joined the Nazi Party.

== World War II and atrocities ==
During the war, Feustel became a member of the SS, after taking a quick course from March to June 1940. He became a Gestapo officer in Czechoslovakia. Feustel was promoted to Obersturmführer on November 9, 1943, then to Hauptsturmführer in January 1945. Feustel was the head of the Gestapo branch in Kolín from 1941 to 1944, and the head of the Gestapo branch in Benešov from 1944 to 1945. In December 1944, Feustel was appointed the head of the Chrudim Sonderkommando, a special anti-partisan police unit meant to counter the activities of the recently founded partisan unit Mr. Jan Hus.

Throughout the war, Feustel and his men arrested civilians and resistance members, who were either executed or sent to prisons and concentration camps. In 1942, after Reinhard Heydrich was fatally wounded following an assassination attempt, Feustel ordered mass raids and arrests; he had 42 Czech civilians executed and 2460 more sent to concentration camps.

On March 26, 1945, 270 SS policemen got into a shootout with 7 Mr. Jan Hus partisans in a forest near Leškovice. The shooting continued throughout the night. It only stopped when the partisans, 5 Soviets and 2 Czechs, ran extremely low on ammunition and made the joint decision to commit suicide rather than face capture. They managed to kill one SS policeman, 42-year-old Hermann Heinz, and wound another officer with a gunshots to the shoulder and face. However, one man, Alexandr Vasiljevič Fomin, who was also the initial commander of Mr. Jan Hus, survived his suicide attempt. He was tortured by the Gestapo during an interrogation, then personally executed by Feustel on March 28. In the final months of the war, Feustel continued to supervise anti-partisan operations. Suspected partisans were arrested, abused, and transferred to the Small Fortress and other prisons, where a number of them died.

On May 7, 1945, a large crowd of people gathered in the public square of Kolín to hear and celebrate the formal announcement of Germany's surrender. Feustel ordered his men to open fire on them. Twelve people were killed outright and 14 others were seriously injured. Another person, 18-year-old Oldřich Krása, had been beaten to death by SS men the day before. Immediately after the massacre, the Germans declared martial law over Kolín. The dead bodies were left in place, and only got released after being identified. Other civilians were forced to an office with their arms raised, searched, and threatened before being sent home. Czechoslovakia was liberated later that month.

The exact death toll of the massacre is disputed. A memorial plaque lists the death toll as 16, but there were only 14 coffins were seen during a mass funeral of the victims on May 11, 1945. Therefore, up to three of those wounded in the massacre might've died from their injuries. SS officials had also shelled the town hall building, but nobody was hurt in that attack.

Following the liberation, the District National Committee in Kolín searched Allied internment and POW camps for Nazi criminals who had committed atrocities in Kolín. While they did find multiple perpetrators of other atrocities, it is not known whether they found anyone responsible for this massacre.

== Post-war activities, arrest, trial, and execution ==
Following the war, Feustel managed to avoid detection and settled down in Hohenstein-Ernstthal East Germany. He lived there with his wife, and found work at the savings bank of the district operator of a trade organization. He worked there as a manager until 1967. In 1971, however, Feustel's identity was discovered by Czechoslovak investigators, who passed on this information to East German officials. Feustel was arrested by the Stasi on December 14. On December 11, 1972, Feustel was found guilty of war crimes and crimes against humanity, and sentenced to death. The Supreme Court of East Germany rejected his appeal on January 26, 1973. After head of state Erich Honecker declined to intervene, Feustel was executed by shooting at Leipzig Prison on May 8, 1973. His body and belongings were then cremated, and he was buried in an unmarked grave in an undisclosed location.
