= Identification of inmates in Nazi concentration camps =

Prisoners' camp identification numbers, cloth emblems, and armbands

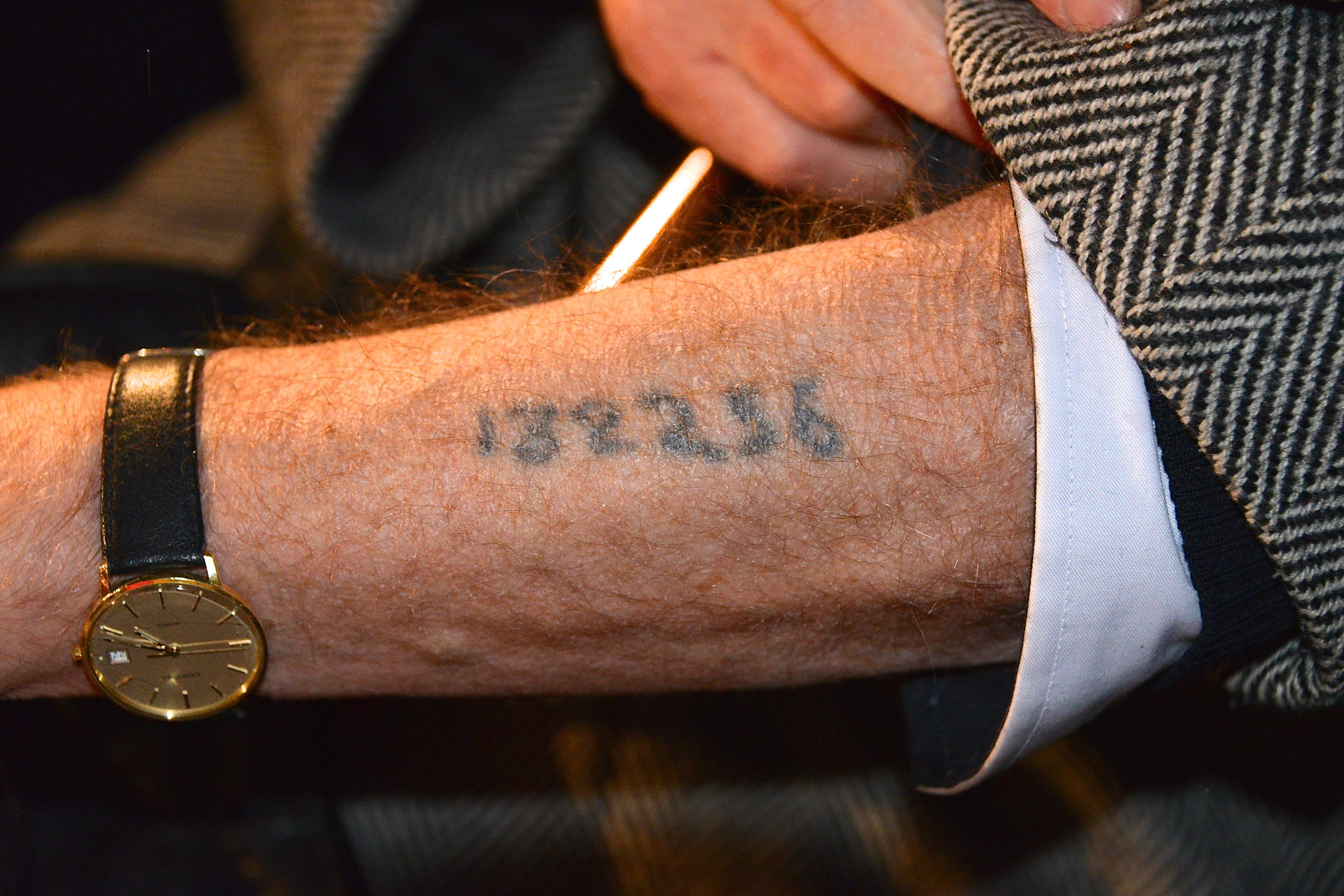
A Holocaust survivor displaying his arm tattoo

Identification of inmates in Nazi concentration camps (operated by Nazi Germany in its own territory and in parts of German-occupied Europe) was performed mostly with identification numbers marked on clothing, or later, tattooed on the skin at Auschwitz. More specialized identification was done with badges on clothing and armbands.

== Numbers ==
A practice was established to tattoo the inmates with identification numbers. Prisoners sent directly to the gas chambers were not tattooed. Initially, in Auschwitz, the camp numbers were sewn on the clothes; with the increased death rate, it became difficult to identify corpses, since clothes were removed from corpses. Therefore, the medical personnel started to write the numbers on the corpses' chests with indelible ink. Difficulties increased in 1941 when Soviet prisoners of war came in masses, and the first few thousand tattoos were applied to them. This was done with a special stamp with the numbers to be tattooed composed of needles. The tattoo was applied to the upper left part of the breast. In March 1942, the same method was used in Birkenau.

The common belief that all concentration camps put tattoos on inmates is not true. The misconception is because Auschwitz inmates were often sent to other camps and liberated from there. They would show a number, but it came from their time at Auschwitz. Metal stamps turned out to be impractical, and later numbers were tattooed with a single needle on the left forearm.

The tattoo was the prisoner's camp entry number, sometimes with a special symbol added: some Jews had a triangle, and Romani had the letter "Z" (from German Zigeuner for "Gypsy"). In May 1944, the Jewish men received the letters "A" or "B" to indicate particular series of numbers. For unknown reasons, this number series for women never began again with the "B" series after they had reached the number limit of 20,000 for the "A" series.

ID numbers

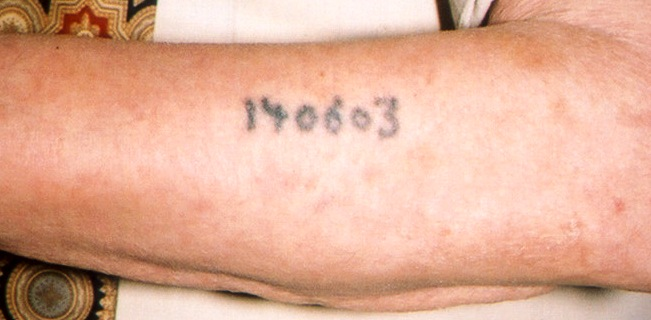
Auschwitz survivor Sam Rosenzweig displays his identification tattoo.

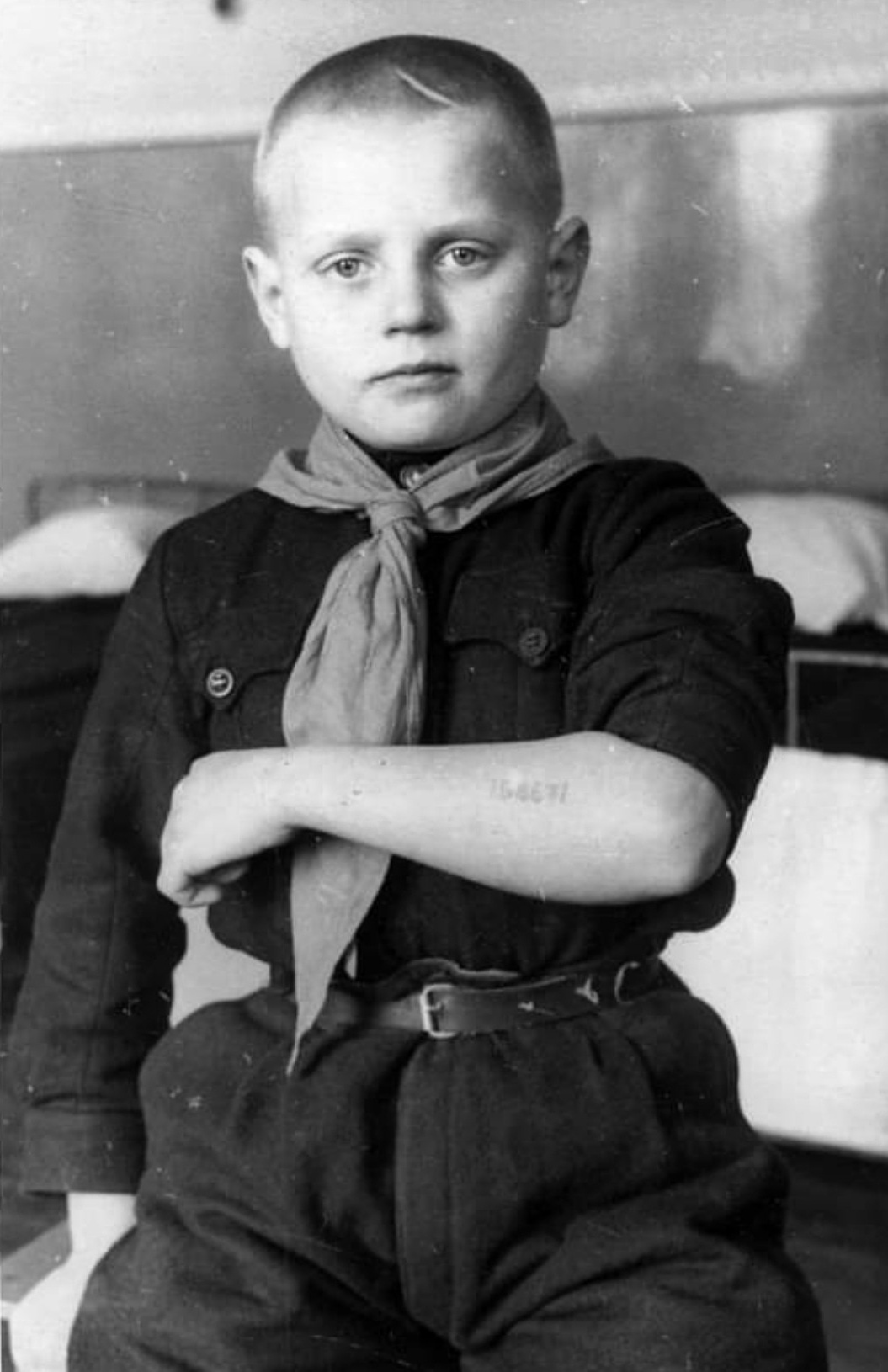
12-year-old Auschwitz survivor Alyosha Lebedev displays his identification tattoo.

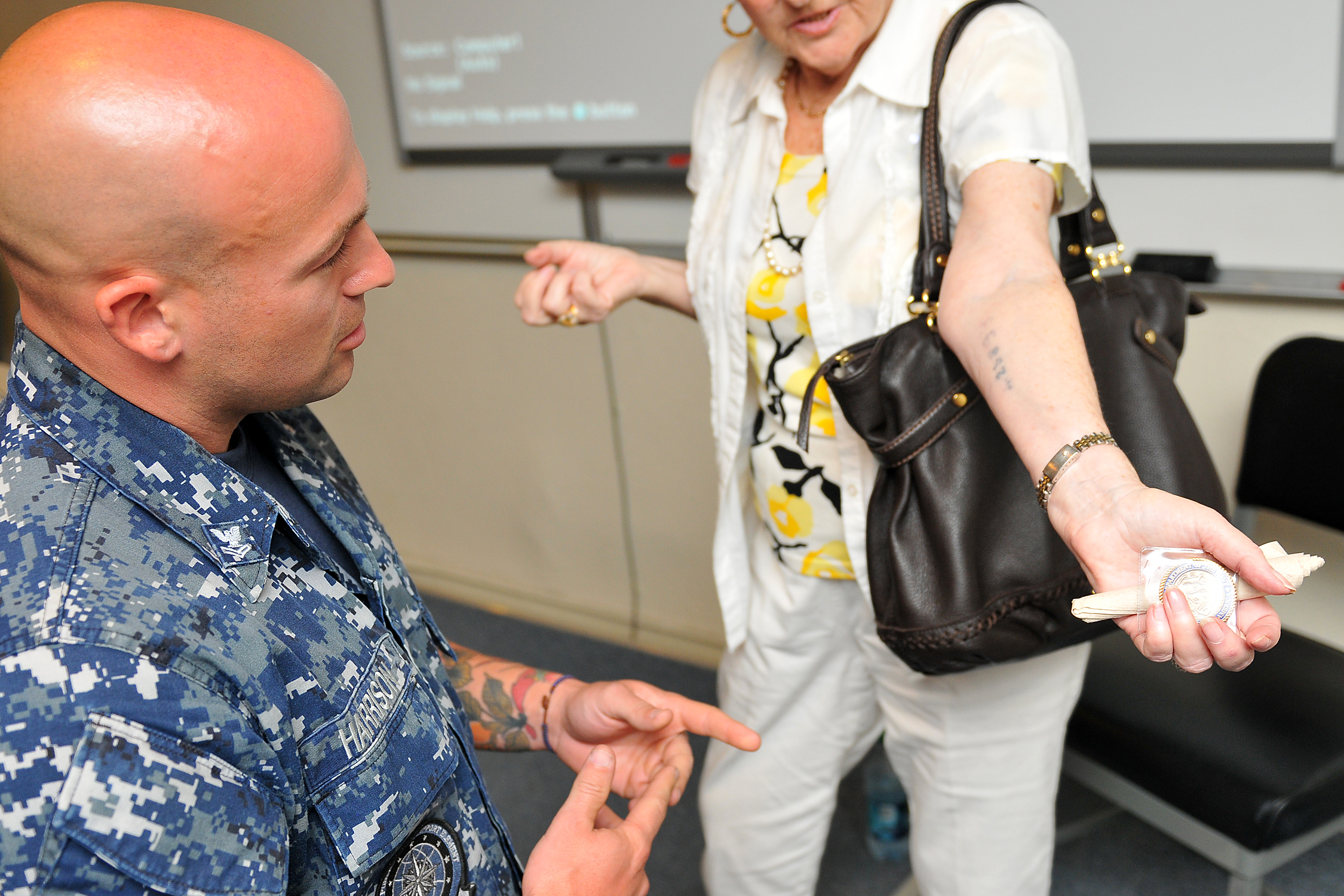
Holocaust survivor Rose Schindler shows the number tattoo on her arm to a U.S. Navy serviceman.

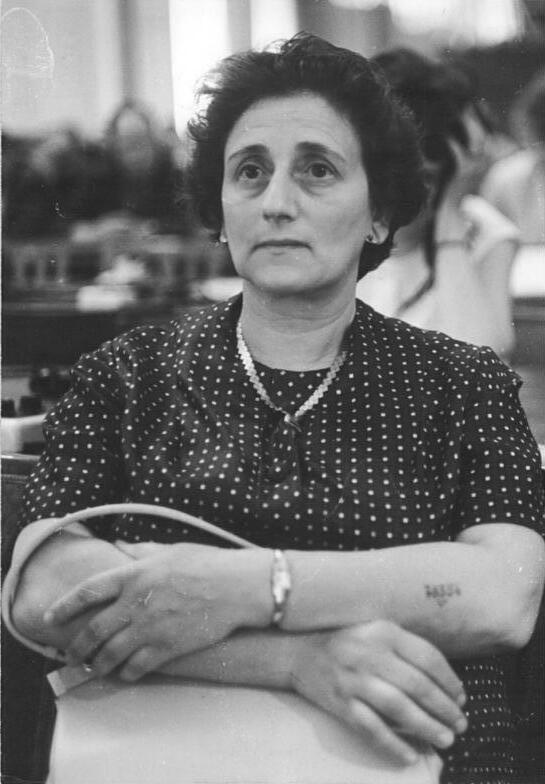
Number tattoo visible on the arm of camp survivor (and, in this photo, 1963 courtroom witness), Eva Furth

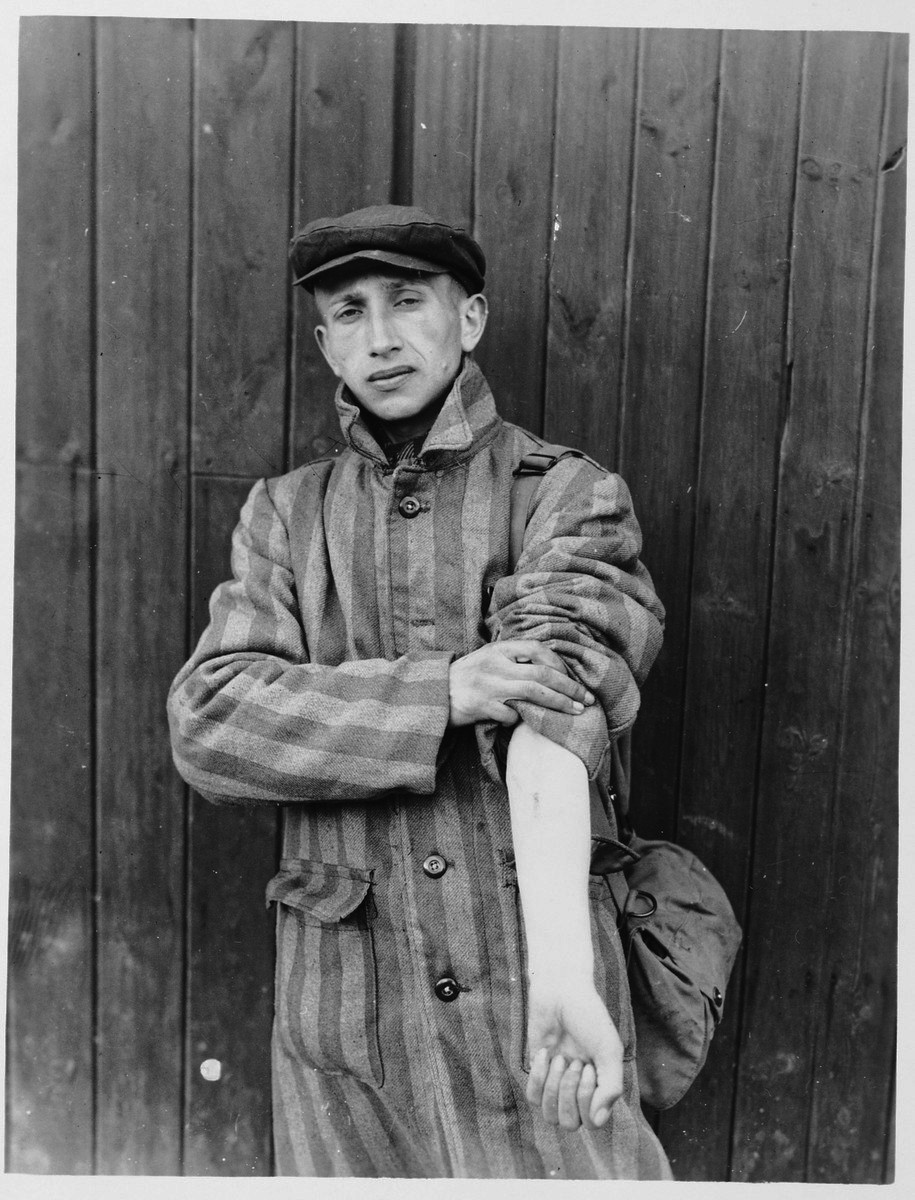
Newly liberated Buchenwald survivor shows his ID tattoo.

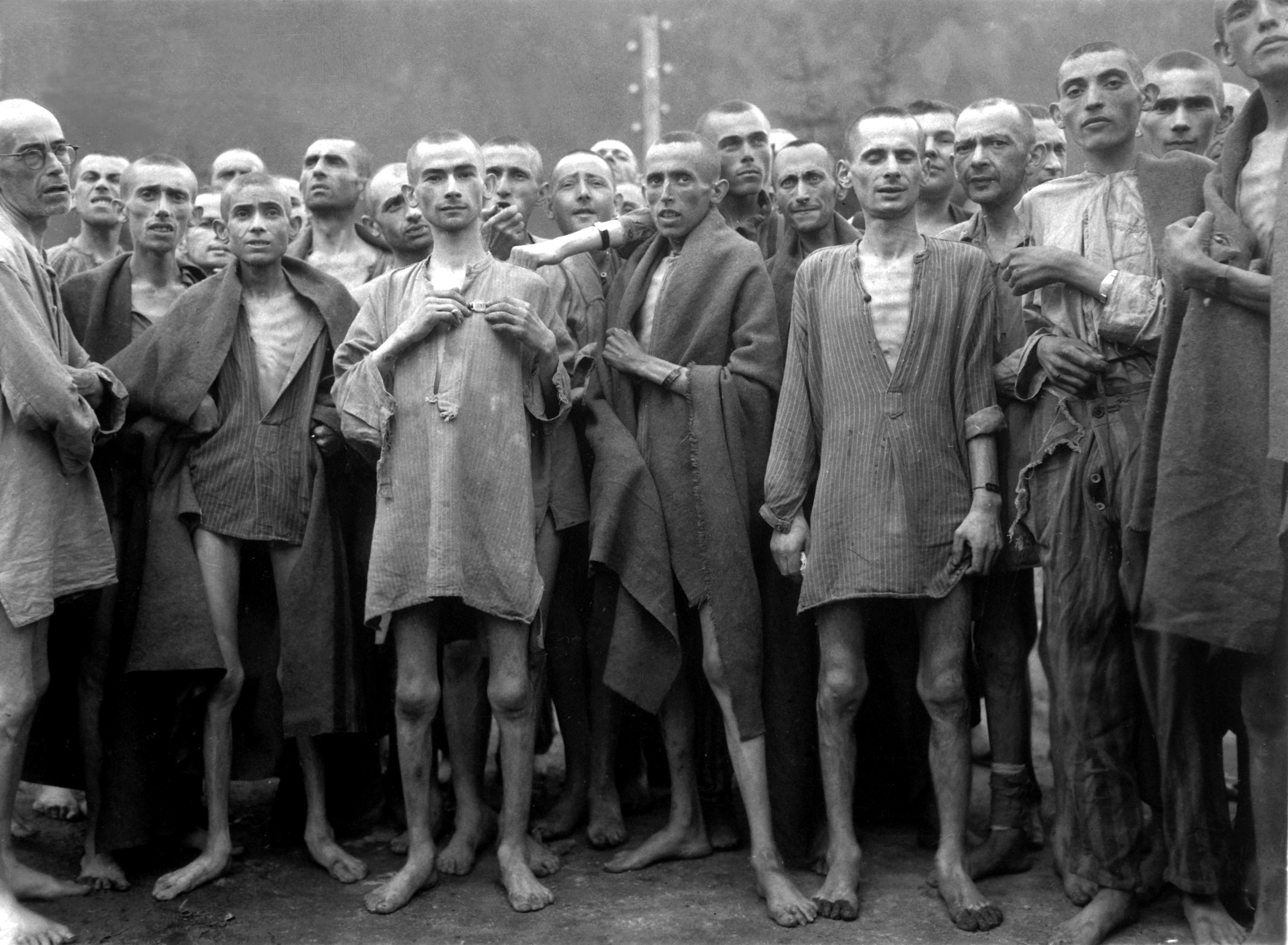
Just-liberated Ebensee concentration camp survivors wear (and some show to the camera) metal tags bearing ID numbers on cord bracelets or necklaces.

== Cloth emblems ==
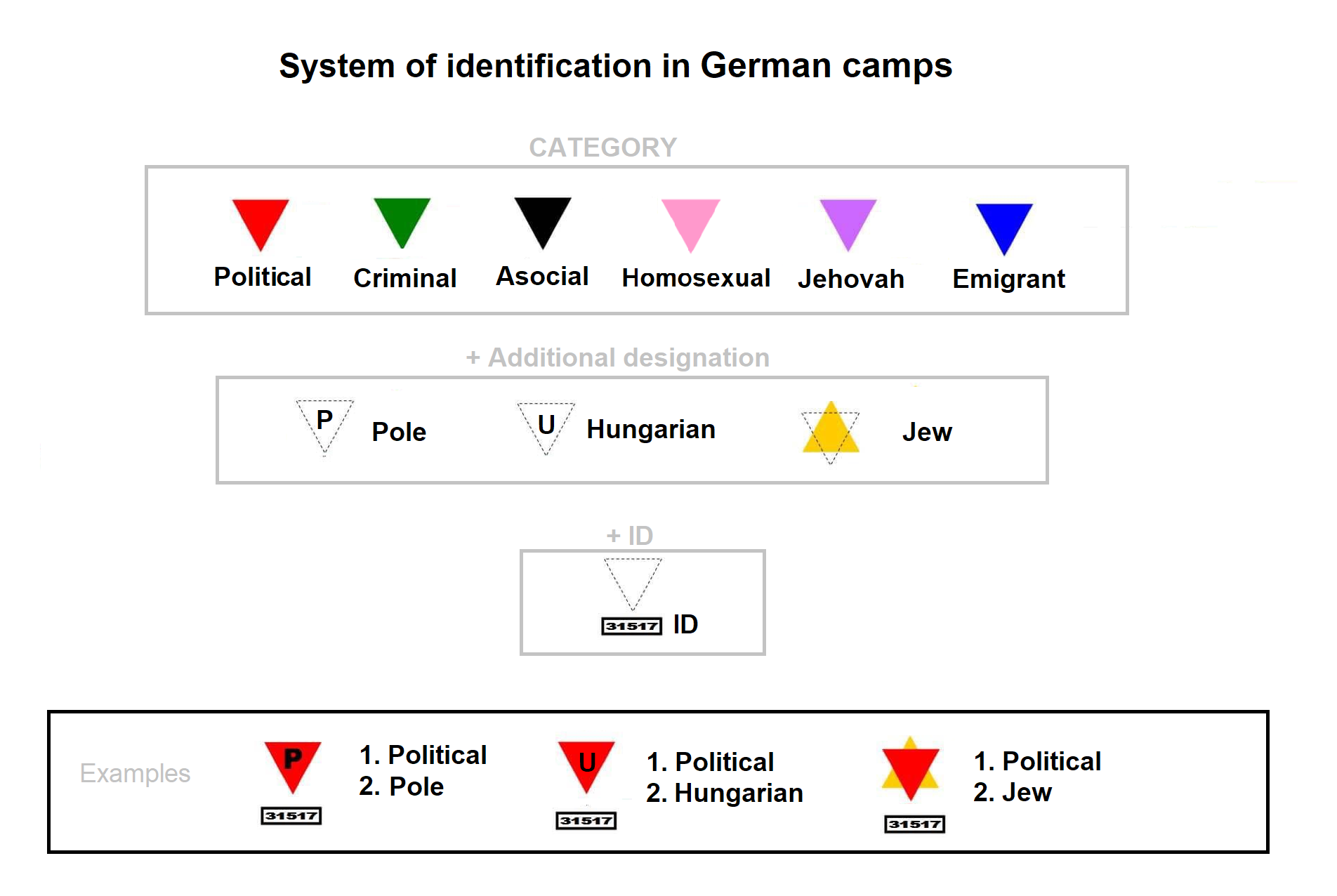
Prisoners' distinguishing badges

Colored inverted triangles were used in the concentration camps in the German-occupied countries to identify the reason the prisoners had been placed there. The triangles were made of fabric and were sewn on jackets and shirts of the prisoners. These mandatory badges had specific meanings indicated by their color and shape. The system of badges varied somewhat between the camps. Such emblems helped guards assign tasks to the detainees: for example, a guard at a glance could see if someone were a convicted criminal (green patch) and thus likely of a "tough" temperament suitable for kapo duty. Someone with an "escape suspect" mark usually would not be assigned to work squads operating outside the camp fence. Someone wearing an F could be called upon to help translate guards' spoken instructions to a trainload of new arrivals from France.

Detainees wearing civilian clothing (more common later in the war) instead of the striped uniforms were often marked with a prominent X on the back. This made for an ersatz prisoner uniform. For permanence, such Xs were made with white oil paint, with sewn-on cloth strips, or were cut (with underlying jacket-liner fabric providing the contrasting color). Detainees would be compelled to sew their number and (if applicable) a triangle emblem onto the fronts of such X-ed clothing.

Examples of cloth ID badges

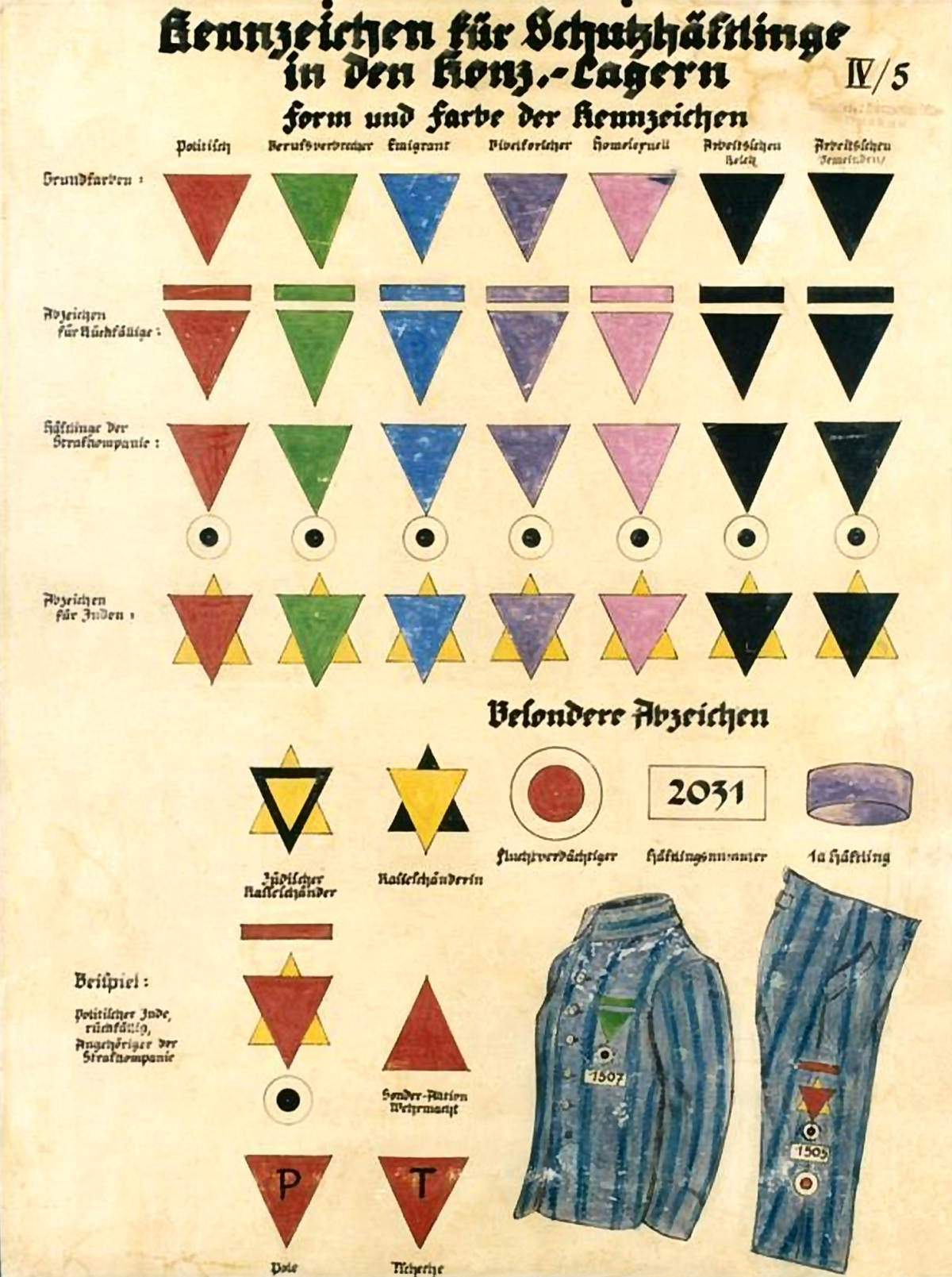
Nazi camp ID-emblems in a 1936 German illustration

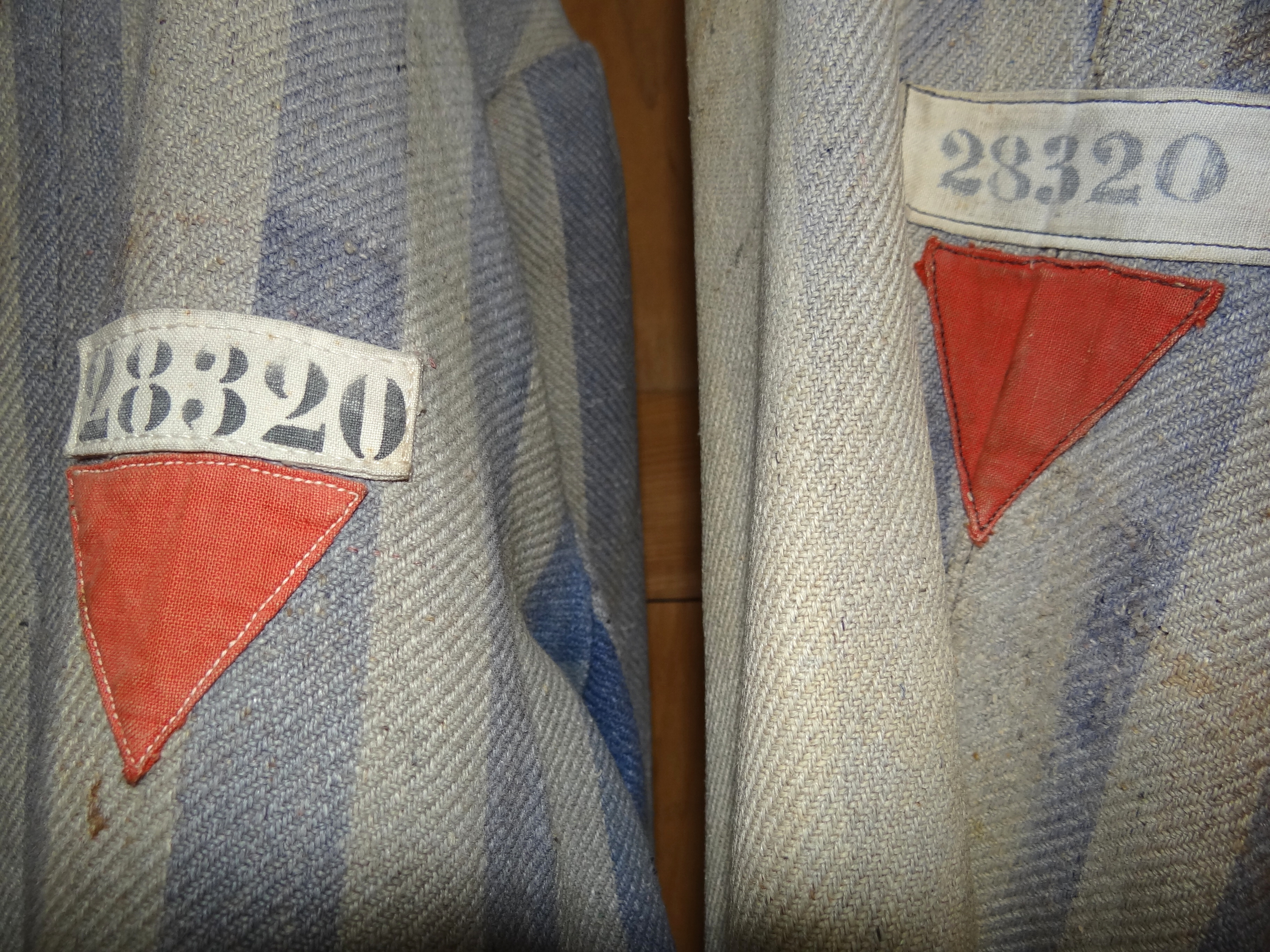
Red triangle emblems of a political enemy on a Dachau detainee's clothing. The white cloth-tape above bears the ID number 28320.

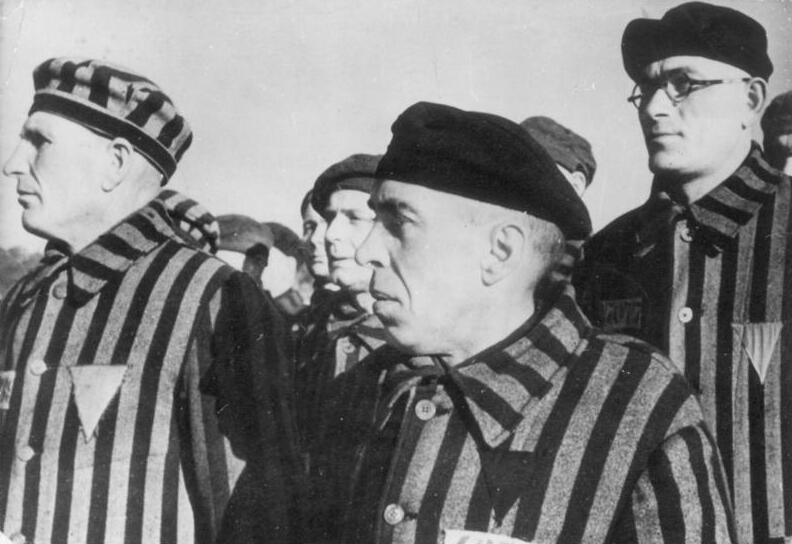
Single-triangle badges in various colors visible on Sachsenhausen concentration camp detainees

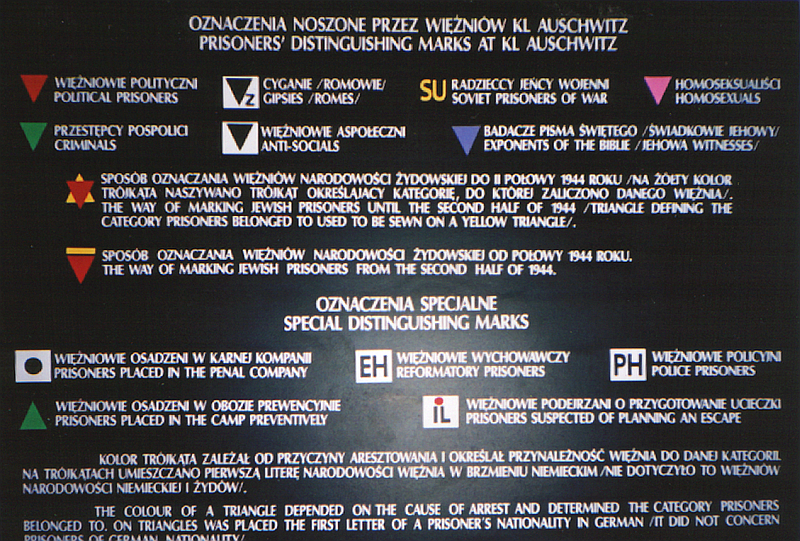
Museum sign shows distinguishing emblems used at Auschwitz.

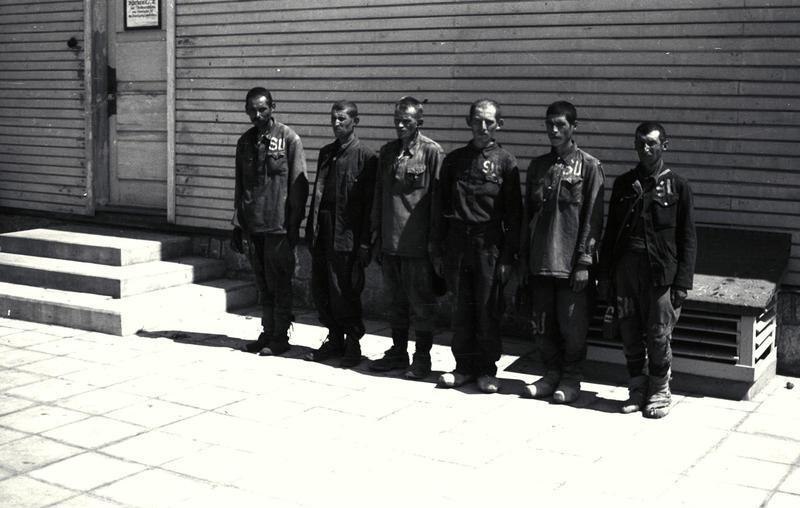
At, Mauthausen, Soviet POWs have SU painted on their clothing (in the manner of the Auschwitz marking-chart in this gallery).

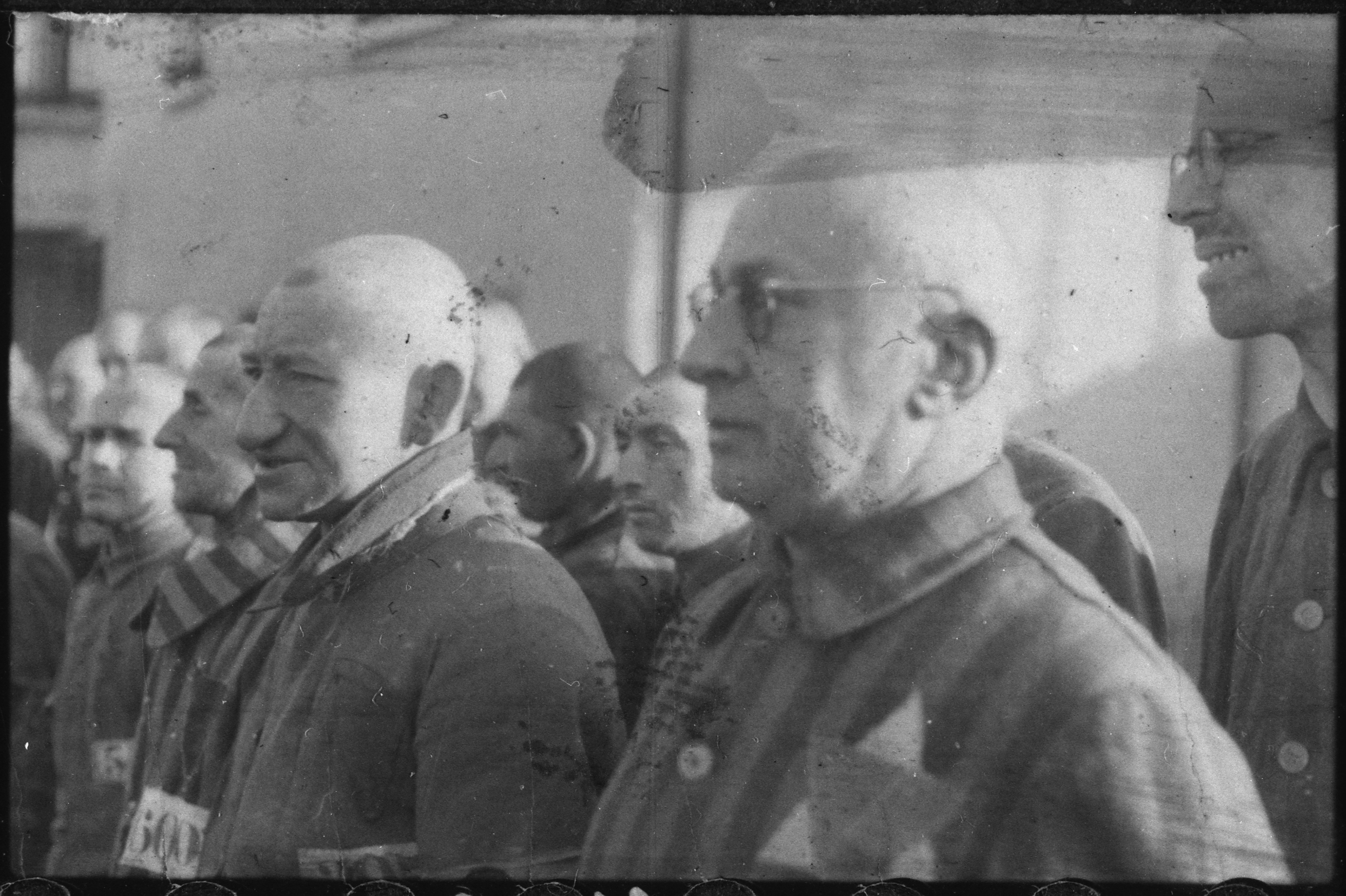
Sachsenhausen detainee with glasses in the foreground wears a two-color double-triangle ID-emblem.

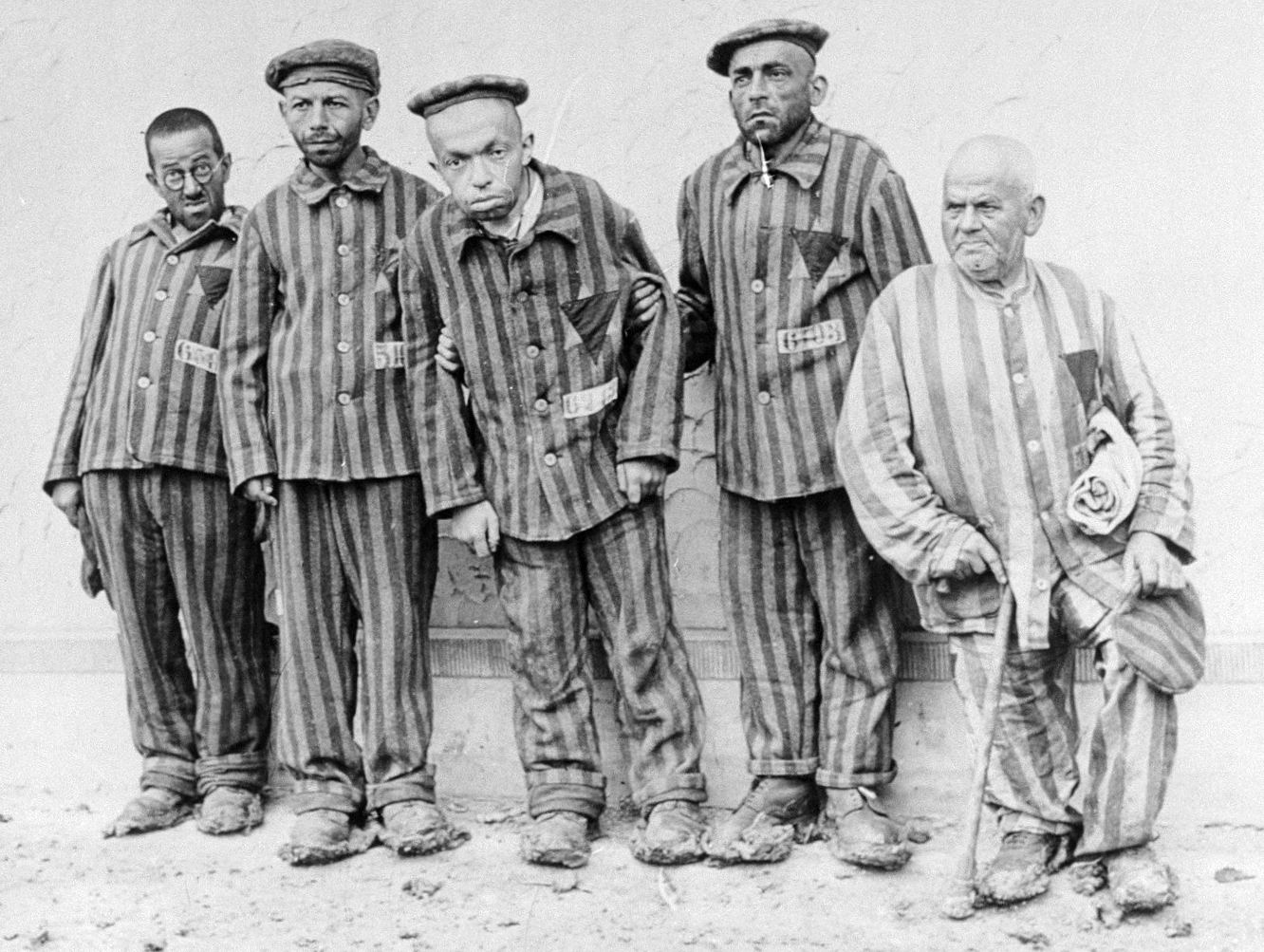
Disabled Jews with double-triangle cloth badges: a black triangle on a yellow triangle, meaning "asocial Jews". Buchenwald, 1938.

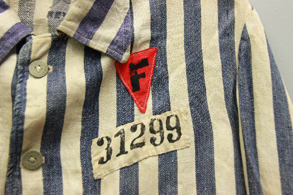
F (French) on a red triangle (political enemy) and ID-number 31299 on the Buchenwald-issue clothing of Dr Joseph Brau

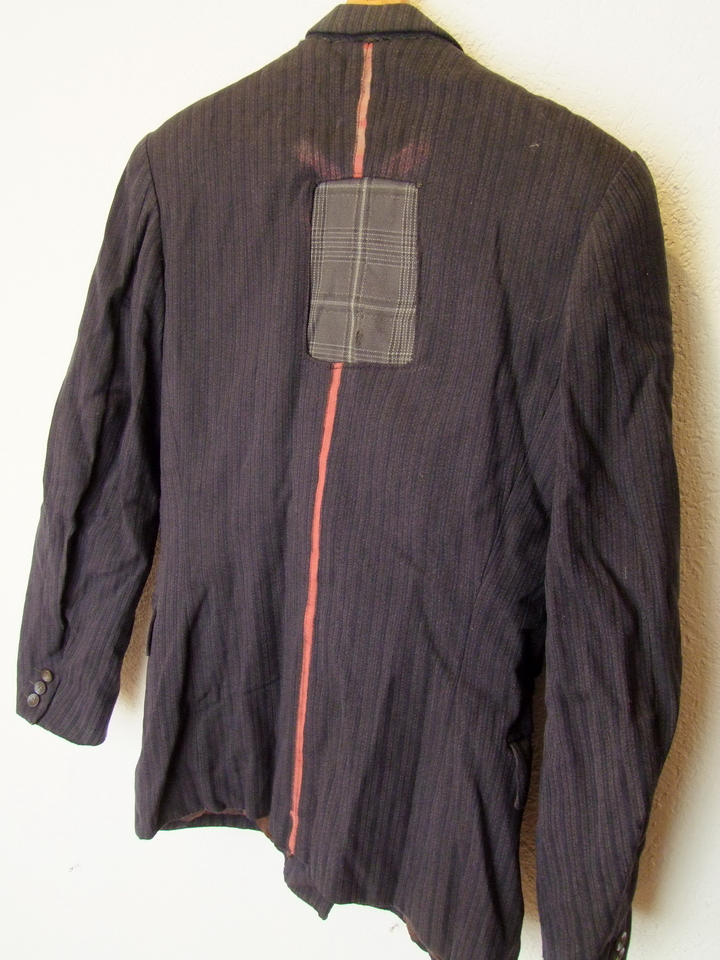
At times, the backs of civilian-style clothing got an X marking to make an ersatz prisoner outfit - this Buchenwald specimen shows traces of an X (which was later scrubbed off and then covered-over with a cloth scrap).

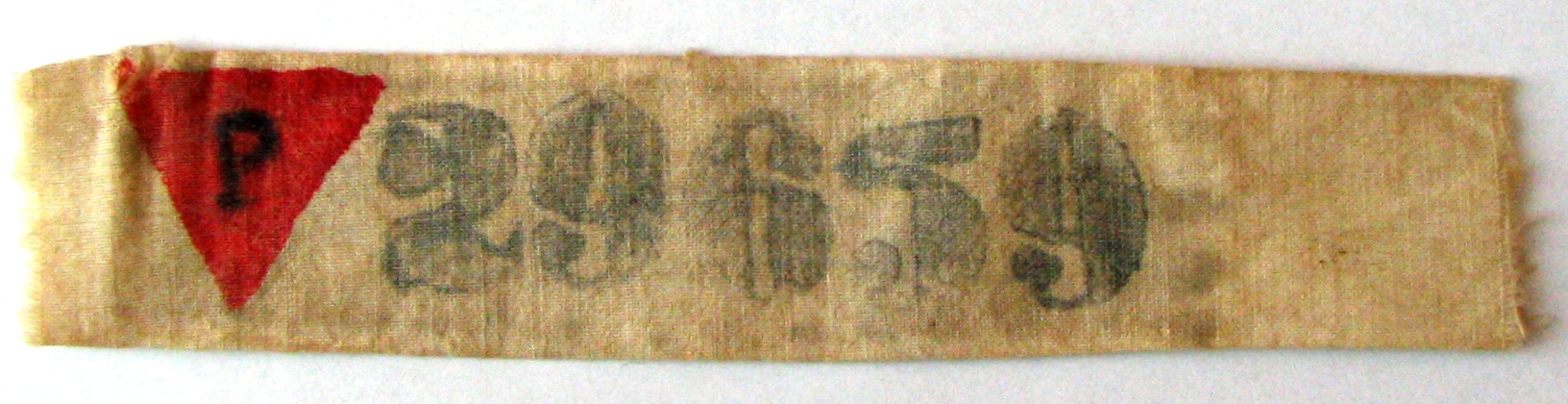
German concentration camp badge for Polish (non-Jewish) political prisoner in Stutthof. ID 29659 - Lidia Główczewska

== Armbands ==
Armbands were used within the camps to identify kapos, camp "police" (detainees assigned to keep order among their fellow detainees), and certain work crew leaders. Armbands were also in use among detainees sent to perform forced labor in factories outside the camps.

Some period examples of ID armbands

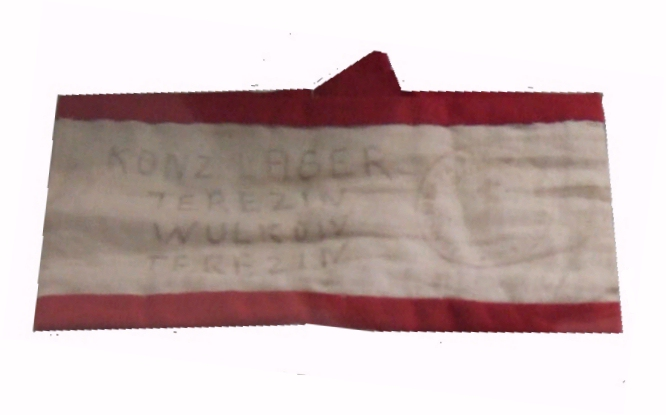
Theresienstadt detainee Else Waldmann's armband for use during assignment to forced labor in a factory outside the camp

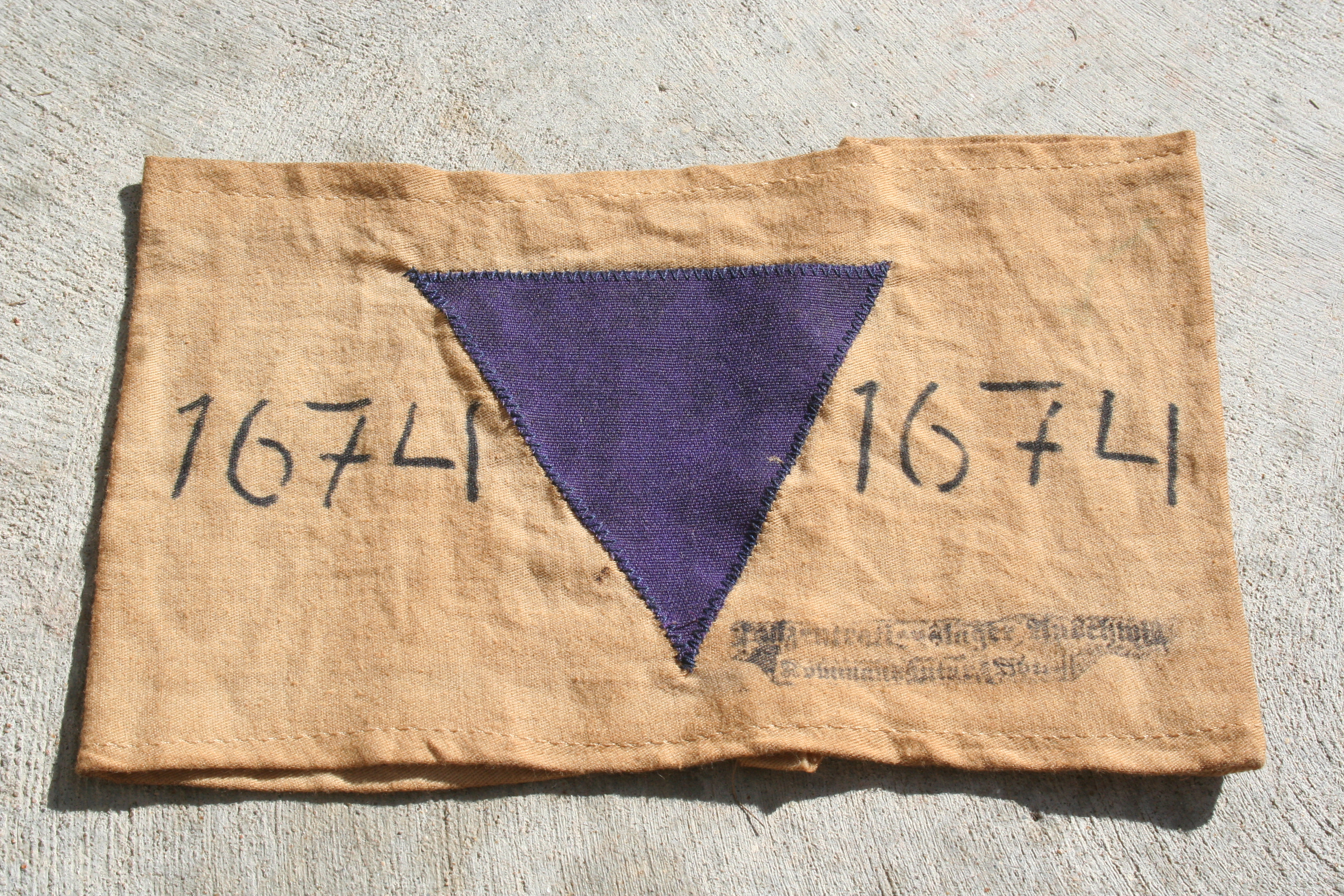
Forced labor squad armband with cloth emblem indicating a Jehovah's Witnesses detainee

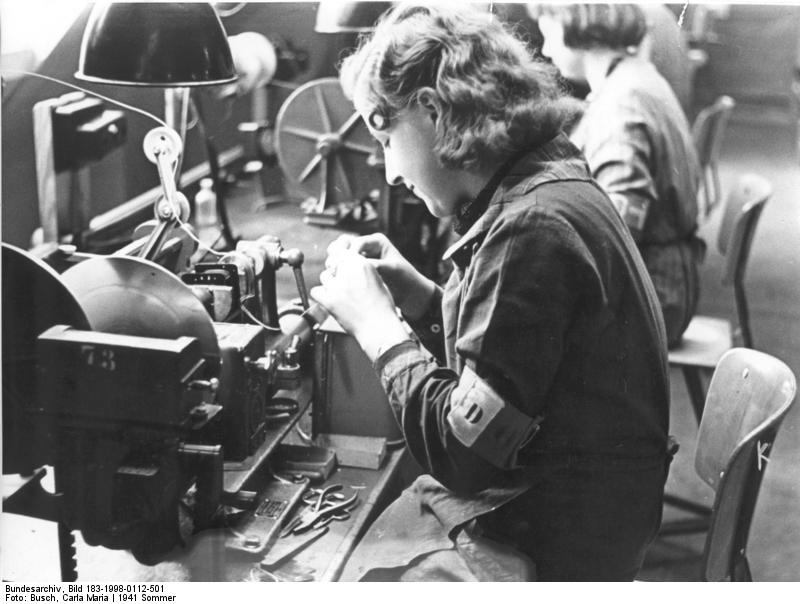
Danish detainee wears a D armband during assignment to forced labor in factory outside the camp.

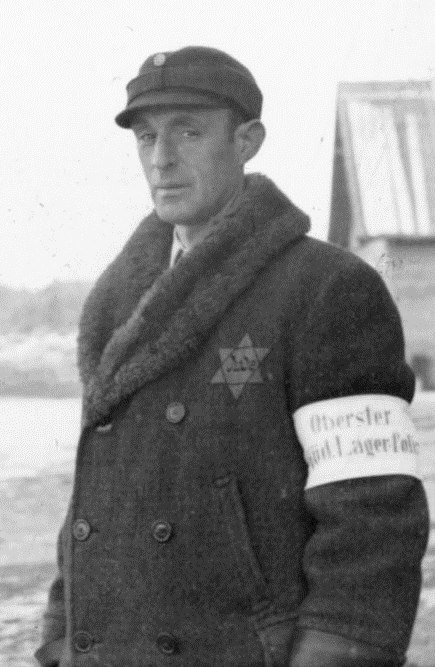
A camp policeman at Salaspils concentration camp with an armband saying "Chief Jewish Camp Policeman"

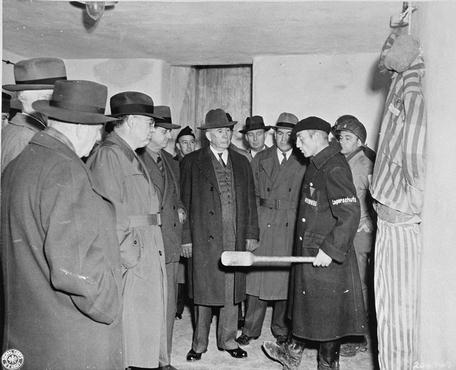
Buchenwald survivor explains to a visiting delegation some brutal methods of keeping order in the camp; he wears a Lagerdienst ("camp service", prisoner-functionary helper of the guards) armband.

== See also ==
- SS blood group tattoo

== Bibliography ==
- FAQ of the United States Holocaust Memorial Museum
