= Leipzig Prison =

Former German prison

Justizvollzugsanstalt Leipzig
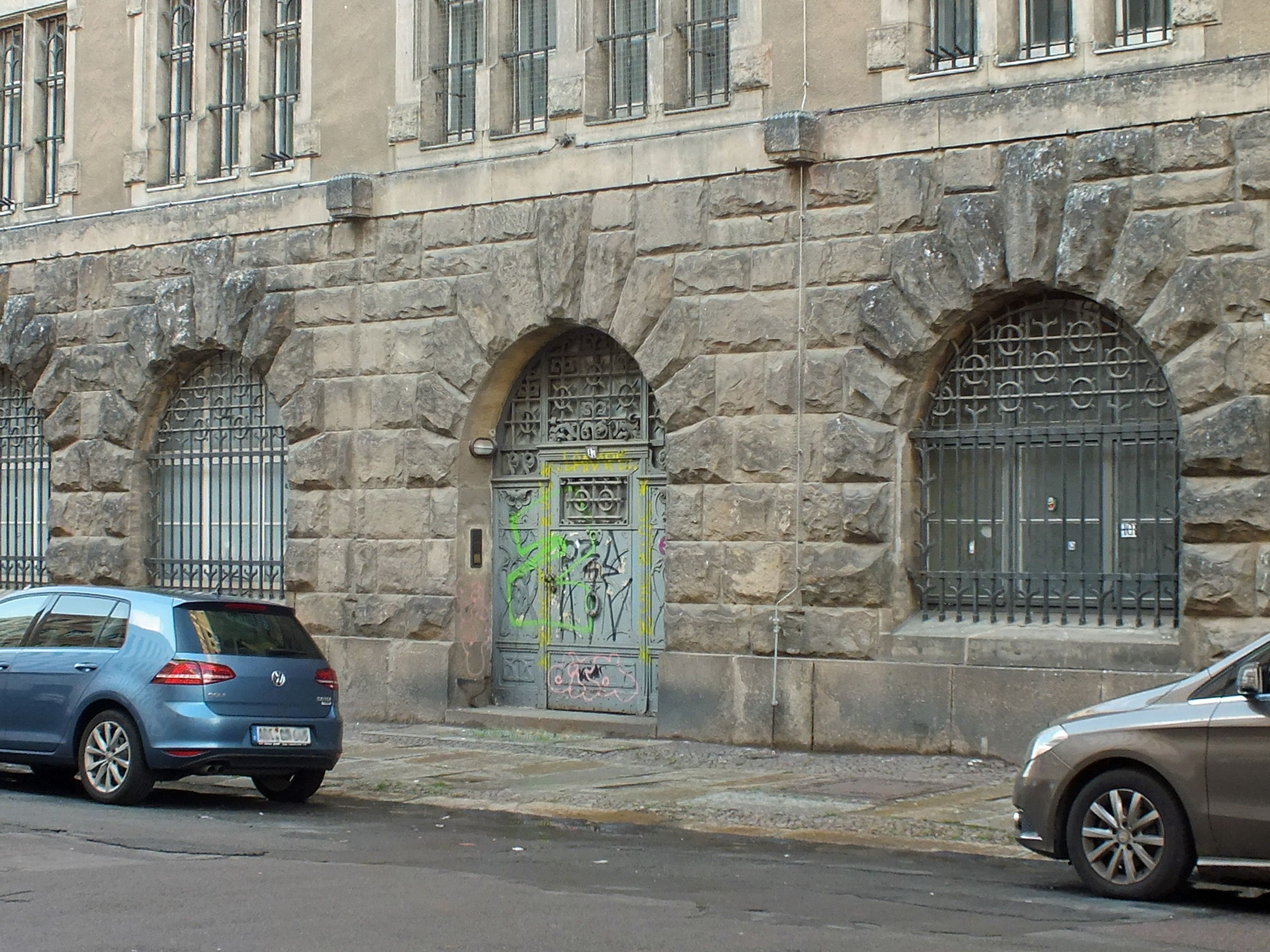
- Entrance to the former prison on Alfred-Kästner-Straße in Leipzig
- Interactive map of Justizvollzugsanstalt Leipzig
- Location: Leipzig, Germany; 51.3226°N 12.3755°E
- Status: closed and partially demolished
- Opened: 1906
- Closed: 2003

Leipzig Prison (Strafvollzugseinrichtung Leipzig, later Justizvollzugsanstalt Leipzig) was a prison in Leipzig, Germany. Built together with an adjacent court building in 1906, it was used as a prison until 2003. During East German rule, a secret part of the prison was used as the central execution site of East Germany. In 1981, Werner Teske was the final person executed here. The prison was used until 2003, the site is now used as an extension of the nearby court building, with the execution site remaining as a memorial site.

== History ==
The prison, together with the Royal Saxonian State Court building (which now houses the Amtsgericht Leipzig) were completed in 1906. Its main entrance was on Alfred-Kästner-Straße, which was in the middle of a residential area in the Südvorstadt neighbourhood of Leipzig. It was used as a prison until 2002.

=== East German execution site ===
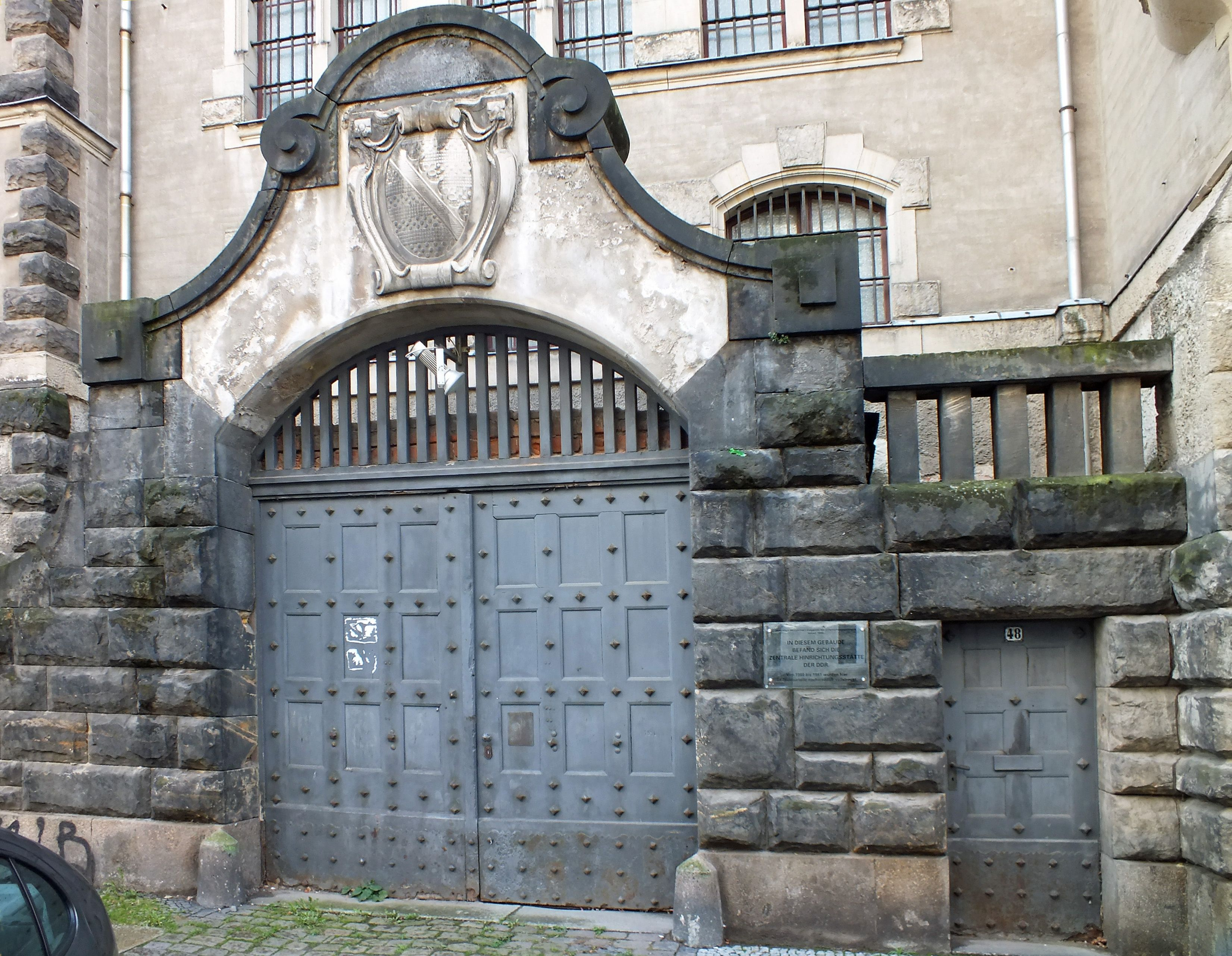
Entrance to the execution wing

From 1960, all executions in East Germany took place in the Strafvollzugseinrichtung Leipzig, as the prison was called in East Germany. A separate entrance (Arndtstraße 48) led to the secret execution site. A total of 64 people were executed here. At first, the execution method was a guillotine, but problems with failed executions led to the adoption of the Nahschuss ins Hinterhaupt (close-range shot into the back of the head) as the execution method from 1968. The executions were secret and hidden from both the people living nearby and from the inmates of the prison. Executed people included ordinary criminals, Nazi war criminals and former Stasi officials. They were given falsified death certificates, cremated and interred anonymously at Leipzig Südfriedhof cemetery. The last person executed here was Werner Teske, who was shot on 26 June 1981.

Between 1960 and 1976, 19 Nazi war criminals were executed at Leipzig Prison.

Since 2008, a memorial plaque (commissioned by the Leipzig city council and designed by Gerd Nawroth) at the Arndstraße entrance commemorates the execution site. The site can be visited only twice per year: during Long Night of Museums and during Tag des offenen Denkmals, organised by the Runde Ecke Stasi museum association.

== Redevelopment ==
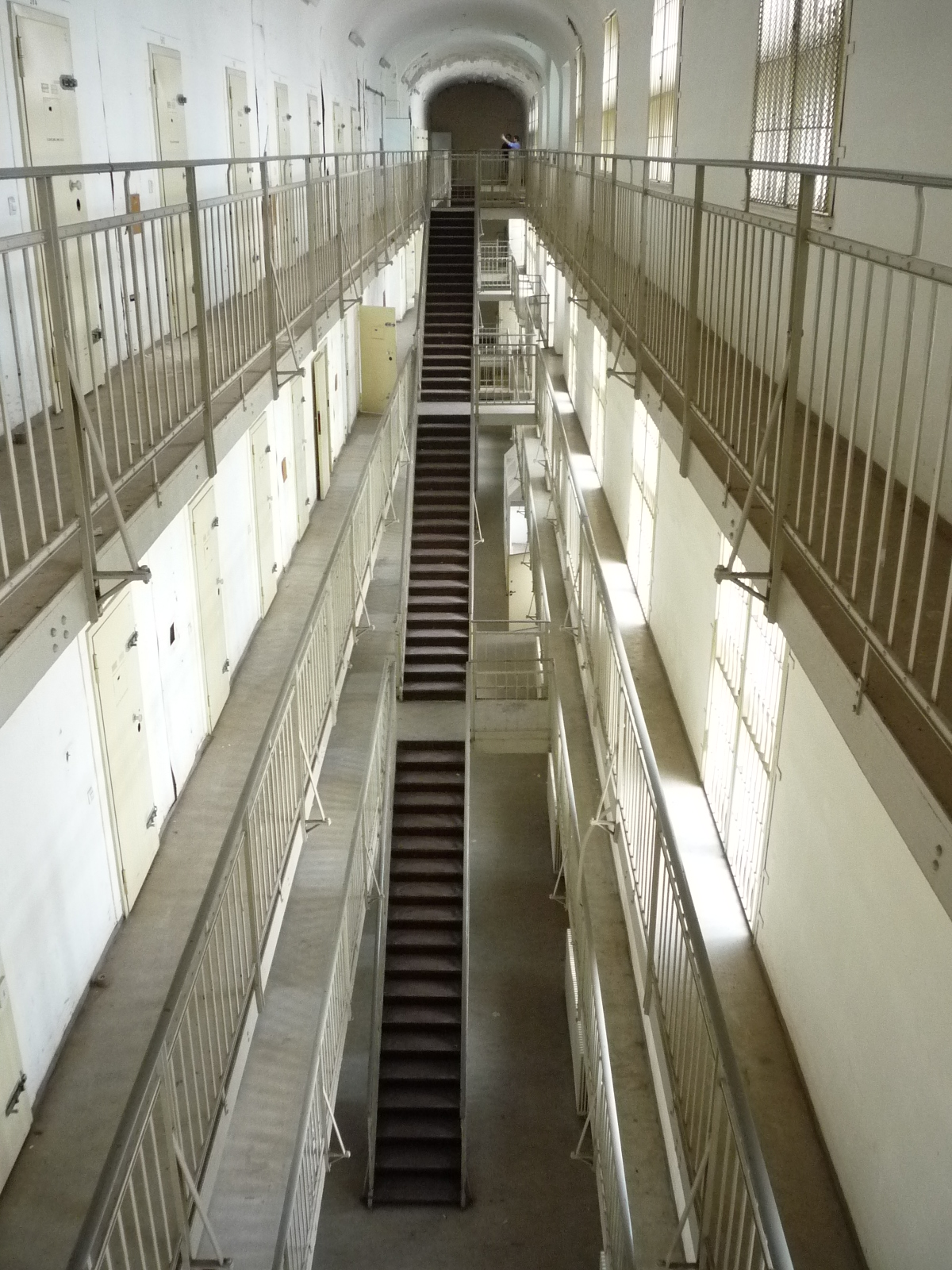
Former cell block within Leipzig Prison

Most of the prison was demolished in 2003. However, the historic façades and the execution site were preserved. In 2017, work was started to turn the former prison site into an extension of the nearby court building, starting with offices for public prosecutors.

== People executed at Leipzig Prison ==
Wilhelm Schäfer – Nazi war criminal who was complicit in numerous atrocities, including the executions of hundreds of Soviet POWs in Buchenwald concentration camp. Executed in 1961.

Horst Petri – Nazi war criminal who was complicit in mass shootings, mass deportations, and other crimes. His civilian wife, Erna Petri, also committed various atrocities. Horst was executed in 1962, while Erna received a life sentence. She was released in 1992, and died in 2000.

Roland Puhr – Nazi war criminal who murdered dozens of prisoners at Sachsenhausen concentration camp. He was also the first commandant of the Lager Sylt camp. Executed in 1964.

Horst Fischer – Nazi war criminal who murdered at least 75,000 people by participating in their selections at Auschwitz concentration camp. He was also the main camp doctor in the infirmary of the Monowitz concentration camp. Executed in 1966. Fischer was the last person to be executed by guillotine in East Germany.

Josef Blösche – Nazi war criminal and Einsatzkommando who participated in at least 2000 murders and at least 300,000 deportations. Blösche also committed thrill-killings and rape-slayings in the Warsaw Ghetto. He became infamous for his appearance in the Warsaw Ghetto boy photo. Executed in 1969.

Hilmar Swinka – Spree killer who murdered three women; executed in 1970.

Hans Baumgartner – Nazi war criminal and Einsatzkommando who participated in the deportations of at least 3000 people and the shootings of nearly 6330 Jews, other civilians, and POWs, in Latvia. Baumgartner actively participated in the Liepāja massacres. Executed in 1971.

Erwin Hagedorn – Serial killer who murdered three young boys; executed in 1972. Hagedorn was the last ordinary criminal executed in East Germany.

Paul Hermann Feustel – Nazi war criminal who had 42 Czech civilians executed and 2460 sent to concentration camps after Reinhard Heydrich was fatally wounded during an assassination attempt. Executed in 1973.

Albert Hugo Schuster – Nazi war criminal who murdered at least 400 civilians in Belarus and Poland; executed in 1973.

Werner Teske – The last man executed in East Germany; executed on political charges in 1981.

== See also ==
- Capital punishment in Germany

== Sources ==
- mdr.de (2019-06-25). "Hinrichtungsstätte der DDR". MDR Zeitreise (in German).
- Pankau, Matthias (2021-06-26). "In Leipzig lauerte der Tod". Idea (in German).
- Kaminsky, Annette, ed. (2016). Orte des Erinnerns: Gedenkzeichen, Gedenkstätten und Museen zur Diktatur in SBZ und DDR (in German). Ch. Links Verlag. ISBN 978-3-86153-862-2.
