= Hans-Georg Neumann =

German murderer (1936–2022)

- Born: 14 September 1936; Berlin, Nazi Germany
- Died: 24 May 2022 (aged 85); Germany
- Known for: Longest-serving prisoner in Germany
- Conviction: Murder (2 counts)
- Penalty: Life imprisonment

Details
- Victims: 2
- Date: 13 January 1962
- Country: Germany
- Date apprehended: 19 January 1962

Hans-Georg Neumann (14 September 1936 – 24 May 2022) was a German murderer who was sentenced to life in prison in 1963 for murdering a pair of lovers on 13 January 1962. He was the longest-serving prisoner in Germany.

== Early life and murder ==
Neumann was born the son of a prostitute and grew up in an urban orphanage in Kreuzberg as well as in a foster family. On 29 December 1951 he was admitted to the Jugendhof Schlachtensee by a juvenile judge for various thefts. In the discharge report, the boy was described a year later as "calm and kind, open-minded and in need of love". In 1953, his foster mother died. He found a connection in the family of a master craftsman, where he started an apprenticeship to be a precision mechanic. In 1956 he embarked for Canada but was deported to Germany in 1961 after being convicted of armed robbery.

On 13 January 1962 he kidnapped a pair of lovers sitting in a parked car in Berlin and shot them, after the woman had resisted, with a Smith & Wesson .38-caliber revolver, which he always carried with him. He was arrested six days later. The man had survived badly injured and was able to identify Neumann, but died shortly thereafter.

== Imprisonment ==
Neumann was sentenced to life imprisonment on 30 May 1963 for the double murder he committed. The trial attracted national attention. The painter Gerhard Richter based one of his paintings on photos of the trial.

Neumann first served his sentence at Tegel Prison, then from 1991 at Bruchsal Prison. In Bruchsal he was considered a quiet prisoner; a first version took place in 1993. In March 1994, the District Court of Karlsruhe found that even life imprisonment no longer required further serving. However, applications for suspended probation (§ 57a StGB) have since been rejected on a regular basis because experts have certified it a negative social forecast. He was also denied a pardon.

In a report dated 5 June 2012, chief physician of the psychiatric-center Nordbaden wrote: "All in all, it can be said that after 50 years in prison, Mr. Neumann seems as unbounded as when he was arrested." Since the death of the serial killer Heinrich Pommerenke in 2008, Neumann has been the longest-serving prisoner in Germany with more than 56 years in prison. On 28 March 2014 the Oberlandesgericht Karlsruhe on the immediate appeal of the then defender, the decision of Penal Enforcement Division at District Court of Karlsruhe confirmed, with which his application for parole was again rejected. Neumann's new defence lawyer filed an appeal against this decision on 28 April 2014 in the Federal Constitutional Court constitutional complaint. This was rejected as unfounded.

Neumann filed another application for parole in 2016, but then withdrew it.

On 17 March 2021 the Oberlandesgericht Karlsruhe ordered his release on parole at an undisclosed future date, with preparations for reintegration to begin immediately.

Neumann was paroled in 2021, and died in 2022.
