= Heinrich Pommerenke =

German serial killer

- Born: Heinrich Max Pommerenke; 6 July 1937; Bentwisch, Nazi Germany
- Died: 27 December 2008 (aged 71); Hohenasperg, Asperg, Germany
- Other name: The Beast of the Black Forest (Ungeheuer vom Schwarzwald)
- Convictions: Murder (4 counts); Attempted murder Rape
- Penalty: Life imprisonment

Details
- Victims: 4+
- Span of crimes: 26 February – 9 June 1959
- Country: West Germany
- State: Baden-Württemberg
- Date apprehended: 19 June 1959
- Imprisoned at: Hohenasperg

Heinrich Max Pommerenke (6 July 1937 – 27 December 2008) was a German serial killer. Detained since 1959, he was the longest-serving prisoner in Germany at the time of his death.

== Origins and first offences ==
Pommerenke came from Bentwisch, Mecklenburg, where his father worked at the Rostock Port. His father died during the war, and his mother left her two children after the war in 1949, after moving to Switzerland. From then on, Pommerenke lived with his grandparents in Mecklenburg. When he was still a student, he committed his first rape. After completing a painting apprenticeship and another rape, Pommerenke fled East Germany for West Berlin in 1953. There, he was picked up by authorities, who contacted his mother. He was then sent to live with his mother in Zürich. His sister, who had been in a children's home for three years, had already moved there a year before. He found work at a fair in Schaffhausen, but when he was again accused of rape, he was expelled from Switzerland and prevented from entering the country for ten years. Other offences, such as robberies and moral crimes, were committed during this time in southern Germany and the Austrian city of Bregenz.

== Crimes and manhunt ==
With a series of murders and attempted murders, Pommerenke caused fear in the Black Forest population. He showed a certain affinity to trains, stations, and railway embankments, but without a clear modus operandi, his actions could not be assigned to him until his arrest. Pommerenke lived in Hornberg at the time.

According to Pommerenke's later confessions, his murderous spree was triggered when he saw a film screening of The Ten Commandments by Cecil B. DeMille while he was at a movie theatre in Karlsruhe during February 1959. After the presentation of the golden calf by slightly clothed women, he concluded that all women are the root of evil and that it was his mission to punish them.

That same evening, he committed the first murder in a park near the cinema. The body, which was raped and whose throat was slit, was that of 49-year-old Hilde Konter, found on 26 February 1959, at the motorway junction in Durlach.

In March 1959, Pommerenke abused 18-year-old Karin Wälde in a wooden hut on the outskirts of Hornberg, killing the young woman with a stone and throwing her body across the river embankment at the nearby railway embankment; her body was discovered on 25 March 1959, on the banks of the Gutach.

On 30 May 1959, in Singen, Pommerenke assaulted an 18-year-old store clerk in her parents' house and attempted to strangle her; however, the victim was able to free herself and call for help, whereupon Pommerenke fled. The woman was able to give the police the following day an exact description of the person, but he was not associated with the previous two murders.

On 31 May 1959, shortly before midnight at the main railway station in Heidelberg, Pommerenke boarded the tourist special train D 969 to Finale Ligure on the Italian Riviera. In the train, he murdered 21-year-old Dagmar Klimek with a knife stab to the chest, threw her body on the Rhine Valley Railway towards Basel just behind Freiburg im Breisgau near the Ebringen breakpoint from the train, then pressed the emergency brake, so that the train three kilometres further south of Schallstadt could come to a standstill. Pommerenke got out of his bed, returned to the corpse, and dragged it to a nearby dirt road, where he committed sexual acts on it. Dagmar Klimek was reported missing by her friends the following day when the train reached the Swiss Bellinzona; a connection with the emergency brake at Schallstadt, in which two witnesses saw a figure climbing out of the train, was not made. On 5 June 1959, Klimek's body was found at the embankment near Ebringen; the forensic examination revealed that the cause of death was a stab wound, while the other injuries, as a result of the fall from the train, were non-fatal. The investigations of the Freiburg police initially came to nothing, also because the rail car in question, which was transferred to Freiburg for examination after a few days with the help of the Federal Criminal Police Office, had been cleaned several times, so that no usable traces could be detected. There was no evidence from the survey carried out of co-travellers at their holiday destinations in Italy.

On 2 June, before the Klimek murder became known, Pommerenke attacked a 25-year-old waitress near the Triberg im Schwarzwald train station, attacking her with an ironbound wood and stealing her purse.

On 6 June, while cycling around in Karlsruhe, Pommerenke injured two women severely by stabbing them in their necks.

On 8 June, Pommerenke broke into the room of a 15-year-old girl through an open window and severely injured her by stabbing her in the neck, but was chased away by her father, who had come to her aid. The police were able to secure a sole imprint of the offender at the scene.

On 9 June, Pommerenke raped and strangled 16-year-old Rita Walterspacher near Baden-Baden, dumping her body in a nearby wooded area where she was found the following day. Again, the investigators lacked any leads.

On 10 June, Pommerenke stole a small-caliber rifle and an air-pressure pistol during a break-in in a weapons shop in Baden-Baden. With this pistol, he invaded on 18 June a ticket office at Durlach station, seizing 540 Deutsche Mark and escaping unrecognized. On the same day, he picked up a suit from a tailor in Hornberg, ordering it under his name. He next left his worn-out clothes and a package behind, which was the small-caliber rifle that he wanted to use in a few days.

A footprint was found at the scene in Durlach station, which corresponded to the track secured on 8 June and the description provided to police with the first evidence of a connection between the burglary and the murders. On 19 June, a man named Schneider from Hornberg reported that he had found a small-calibre rifle and provided personal data of the perpetrator; the same day, Pommerenke was recognised in Hornberg and was arrested on the station's forecourt.

== Confession and conviction ==
In the course of the ensuing interrogations, Pommerenke admitted to a total of 65 offences, including four murders, seven attempted murders, two rapes and 25 attempted rapes, six robberies, ten burglaries and six thefts.

Pommerenke's trial began on 3 October 1960, before the district court of Freiburg im Breisgau. Of the offences confessed by him, 38 were not prosecuted, since at the time he had not reached the age of 21. The appraisers, Hans Ruffin and Christoph Staewen, declared the defendant guilty. On 22 October, he was sentenced to life imprisonment six times and another 15 (from single sentences 165) years in prison; it was the most severe sentence of a West German court of the post-war period.

From 1960, Pommerenke was imprisoned in the Bruchsal prison; suspension of his sentence was repeatedly denied because he continued to be a high-security risk.

At the end of 2006, Pommerenke was transferred to Hohenasperg, where the central hospital of Baden-Württemberg prison was located, where he would undergo social therapy. The therapy, however, was cancelled after a year, since Pommerenke was moved to the Heilbronn prison.

On 27 December 2008, Pommerenke died due to leukemia in Hohenasperg, at the age of 71. The body was cremated and the ashes scattered at sea. He was, until his death, Germany's longest-serving prisoner. In this regard, he has since been replaced by Hans-Georg Neumann.

== Documentary films ==
- Tom Ockers: Lebenslang weggesperrt ... Der Frauenmörder Heinrich Pommerenke, Die großen Kriminalfälle
- In 1961, the case of Pommerenke was the subject of a comprehensive publication in the Kriminalistik journal
- In 2004, the ARD broadcast a Südwestrundfunk-produced TV documentary by Michael Busse titled Before you sits the Devil, which found a wide echo in the printed media.
- In 2013, Südwestrundfunk produced a "criminal documentary game" on the subject titled The Women Murderer Heinrich Pommerenke.

== See also ==
- List of German serial killers
