= Hilmar Swinka =

Hilmar Swinka (1938 in Berlin – October 1, 1970 in Leipzig) was an East German spree killer who killed three women in East Berlin from February 13 to 14, 1969.

Swinka was the son of a reportedly contentious and irascible father who left his family after being released from captivity. Swinka himself was diagnosed with intermittent explosive disorder at the end of his school days. He was considered a contact-poor loner and outsider, who finished school but did not graduate. He initially worked as a casual worker, but to compensate for physical deficits, he joined a boxing club at 17 years old. He later became a criminal and was punished several times for violent crimes. Eventually, he got a job as a lab assistant and later section assistant at the Pathological Institute of the Charité in East Berlin. While in this position, Swinka developed an interest and continued to study, privately setting up his own knife collection.

On February 13, 1969, he went to two former lovers and killed both by strangulation and shoving stitches in the heart area, then "dissected" the corpses. He considered these killings as a rehearsal for the murder of his ex-wife. The following day he went to her, cut her throat and "dissected" her too. He was arrested at the scene by police, which were contacted by neighbours.

The trial against Swinka was conducted under strict secrecy, since from the point of view of the former rules in East Germany this case offered propaganda possibilities from the West. Swinka was sentenced to death, and on October 1, 1970, at Leipzig Prison, shot from close range by executioner Hermann Lorenz. The body was then taken to the crematorium in the Südfriedhof and was cremated, and the ashes were buried anonymously in the cemetery area.

Swinka's murders were presented in two books. The legal physician and former head of the Institute of Legal Medicine of Berlin, Gunther Geserick, and its co-authors Vendura and Wirth describe the man as Hilmar S., while author Hans Girod names him as Henry Stutzbach.

== Literature ==
- Hans Girod: Blutspuren. Weitere ungewöhnliche Mordfälle aus der DDR. Knaur, München 2003, ISBN 3-426-77634-0, p. 216–249.
- Gunther Geserick/Klaus Vendura/Ingo Wirth: Zeitzeuge Tod. Spektakuläre Fälle der Berliner Gerichtsmedizin. Militzke-Verlag, Leipzig 2003, ISBN 3-86189-605-2.
