= Life imprisonment in Germany =

In Germany, life imprisonment (German: lebenslange Freiheitsstrafe) has an indeterminate length and is the most severe punishment that can be imposed. A person sentenced to life imprisonment may normally apply for parole after having served 15 years. If the parole court rejects the application, the inmate may reapply after a court determined blocking period no longer than two years (§ 57a IV StGB). If the court has determined a "severe gravity of guilt" exists (besondere Schwere der Schuld), parole is delayed for a non-specific period beyond 15 years (§ 57a StGB).

In declining a prisoner's first application for parole, the parole court determines a lack of suitability based on the extreme gravity of the offence, as well as the development (or lack thereof) of the prisoner behind bars. Such determination includes how many additional years the inmate must serve before again being eligible to apply for early release. There is no legal limit on the term the parole court can hand down, though in practice the average term is about 5 years, and longer periods are rare.

== Notable cases of life imprisonment ==
In the case of the Red Army Faction terrorist Christian Klar, the parole court ordered a deferment of at least 11 years (making his sentence a minimum of 26 years) before he again became eligible for parole. Such a long length was due to his involvement in multiple killings, lack of remorse, and his affiliation with a terrorist group.

In another case, a court ruled the defendant had to serve at least 38 years in prison for the murder of five people. He was incarcerated beyond the required 38 years after it was determined he was a danger to society. Such a ruling mandates continued imprisonment de jure, as being safe toward society is required to be paroled from a life sentence (§ 57a I Nr. 3 StGB in conjunction with § 57 I Nr. 2 StGB). However, the case was appealed to the German Constitutional Court (BVerfG, Judgment from 29.11.2011 - 2 BvR 1758/10), which held that the decision to hold the prisoner beyond the original 38 years was unconstitutional for case-specific reasons.

One of the most prominent "long termers" has been Heinrich Pommerenke, who in total had served 49 years, from 1959 until his death in 2008, for mass murder and rape. As of 2023, the record is held by Hans-Georg Neumann who was sentenced to life in prison in 1963 for murdering a pair of lovers and completed 59 years (including pretrial detention) in prison until his release was ordered in 2021.

== Release and imposition of preventive detention ==
In instances where the convict is found to pose a clear and present danger to society, the sentence may include a provision for preventive detention (German: Sicherungsverwahrung) after the actual sentence is satisfied. This is technically not considered a punishment, but a decision to protect the public, and elements of prison discipline that are not directly security-related are relaxed for those in preventive detention. The preventive detention may be continued every two years until it is found the convict is unlikely to commit further crimes or be a menace to the public. Since 2004, it has also been possible for preventive detention to be ordered by a court after the original sentencing if the danger that a criminal poses upon release becomes obvious during their imprisonment. Despite its non-punitive status and the broadness of its potential application, though, preventive detention is used only in exceptional cases.

Paroled prisoners usually must stay in regular contact with a civilian "parole helper" (Bewährungshelfer) for the duration of their parole. The parole period in the case of life imprisonment is five years (§ 57 III StGB).

== 1977 judgement on life imprisonment ==
Prior to 1977, all life sentences in Germany were imposed without the possibility of parole (though pardons were sometimes granted). In 1977, the German Constitutional Court found that mandatory sentences of life imprisonment without the possibility of parole in all cases are unconstitutional because the respect of human dignity requires a "realistic prospect of being released", and the principle of the Rechtsstaat requires a legal regulation for when a prisoner is released. The imposition of life sentences was thus found constitutional, as long as the laws allow for some hope of release. As a consequence, §57a StGB was introduced in 1981, allowing parole even for life imprisonment.

In consequence, mandatory life sentences are still imposed in Germany for murder, although with the possibility of being released. The ruling does not mean that every convict has to be released, nor does the ruling mean that mandatory life sentences cannot be imposed, but that every convict must have a realistic chance for eventual release, provided they are considered safe to the community. It is at the discretion of the court to decide the length of the parole period, or if the offender is actually eligible for parole. If the convicted person is found not to be safe to the community, they either may be ordered never to be released or be released after a longer period of time, such as parole being delayed for a unspecified period of 15 years or longer.

Although German law does not explicitly provide for life imprisonment without parole, there is a possibility that some convicts serving life sentences may never be released, particularly if they are considered too dangerous and unlikely to be rehabilitated, or if they are sentenced to extensively long non-parole periods in prisons that would generally last beyond a normal life span, such as 40 to 50 years. As a formality, the inmate has to agree to his release on parole (§ 57a I Nr. 3 StGB). Displays of contrition or appeals for mercy are not a condition for such a release. Today, most life sentences are normally given for murder.

== Statistics ==
According to data from the federal ministry of justice (1998) the average time served for a life sentence in Germany is 19.9 years.

== Crimes allowing for life imprisonment ==
=== Mandatory sentence ===
Murder, genocide, crimes against humanity, and war crimes against a person.

=== Possible sentence ===
Planning a war of aggression, high treason, treason, illegal disclosure of secrets, engaging in relations that endanger peace, manslaughter, child abuse causing death, sexual assault causing death, robbery causing death, arson causing death, abduction for the purpose of blackmailing causing death, taking hostages causing death, effecting a nuclear explosion causing death, effecting an explosion causing death, misuse of ionizing radiation causing death, attacking a driver for the purpose of committing a robbery causing death, and attacking air or sea traffic causing death.
