= Werner Teske =

East German Stasi Captain

- Photograph of Teske from his employee files
- Born: 24 April 1942; Berlin, Nazi Germany
- Died: 26 June 1981 (aged 39); Leipzig Prison, Leipzig, East Germany
- Cause of death: Execution by shooting
- Burial place: Südfriedhof, Leipzig
- Occupation: Intelligence officer
- Known for: Last person executed by East Germany in June 1981

Werner Teske (24 April 1942 – 26 June 1981) was an East German Hauptmann (Captain) of the Ministry for State Security (Stasi). Teske was a senior intelligence officer in the Stasi's economic espionage division when he was accused of plotting to defect to West Germany with sensitive information and embezzled money. In the one-day trial, Teske was found guilty of espionage and desertion. He was sentenced to death and subsequently executed in June 1981.

Teske's sentence was posthumously overturned after German reunification when it was deemed unlawful by standards of East German law, and two jurists from his trial were prosecuted. The execution was the last time a death sentence was carried out in East Germany, before its abolition in 1987, making Teske the last person executed in Germany.

== Early life and career ==
Werner Teske was born on 24 April 1942 in Berlin, and went to school from 1948 to 1960 in Berlin-Lichtenberg, graduating with the Abitur. (Note: The Abitur is a German secondary school qualification that allows a student to enter university.) During this time, he also played handball for an East German junior team. He studied economics at Humboldt University of Berlin from 1960 to 1964 and graduated with a degree in financial economics. A staunch communist, he entered the Socialist Unity Party of Germany (SED) in 1966 and became an unofficial collaborator (IM) of the Stasi in 1967. In 1969, he obtained his doctorate in economics, and started working full-time for the Hauptverwaltung Aufklärung, the foreign intelligence arm of the Stasi.

Teske was part of the East German delegation that accompanied the East Germany national football team to the 1974 FIFA World Cup, which was held in West Germany. He was promoted to Hauptmann in 1975 and sent abroad again to the 1976 Winter Olympics in Innsbruck.

Teske was married to Sabine Teske. They had one daughter.

== Defection plans and trial ==
East German notification of Teske's arrest on 12 September 1980

In the mid-1970s, Teske began to question the political system in East Germany, and planned to defect to West Germany, with the intention of using highly sensitive Stasi information and materials as an "entrance fee". He put aside money for this purpose, around 20,000 Deutsche Mark and a similar amount of East German marks. However, in 1979 the Stasi tightened its internal security measures following the defection of Werner Stiller, a Stasi Oberleutnant (first lieutenant) who fled to West Germany carrying sensitive information. In September 1980, Teske was arrested when irregularities in his work came to attention of the Stasi after he had failed to turn up to an appointment when he had been drunk at home. A cache of stolen documents was found in his work safe. Later, his previous embezzlement of operating money from his Stasi division was uncovered, and another cache of documents was found stashed in his apartment.

Teske was tried at the 1st Military Criminal Division of the Supreme Court of East Germany. He was accused of "planned treason", and was found guilty of charges of espionage, desertion, and an illegal border crossing. Despite the defence counsel's argument that the defection had never occurred and no information had reached the West, Teske received the maximum sentence and was sentenced to death after a one-day trial on 11 June 1981 before a three-judge panel of Stasi officers. The severity of Teske's sentence might have been a reaction to Werner Stiller's defection to the West two years earlier, and the attempted defections both of Teske and fellow Stasi officer Gert Trebeljahr, who was executed in 1979, have been linked to Stiller's as copycat crimes. Stiller himself stated in 1992 that Teske would likely have received a life sentence instead of being executed had his own defection not occurred.

== Death ==
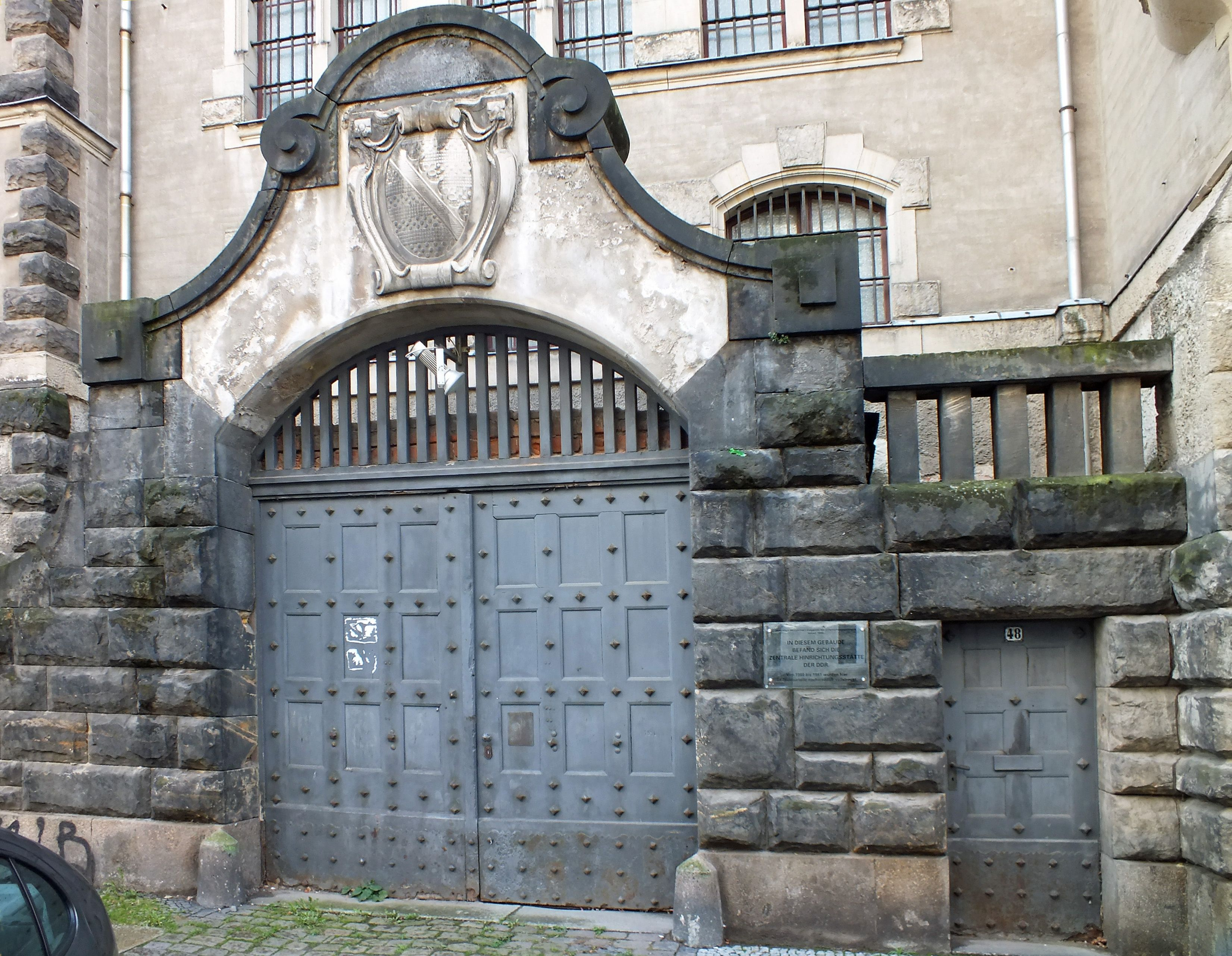
Entrance to Leipzig Prison, with a memorial plaque stating that the central execution site of East Germany was in this building

On 26 June 1981, shortly after his trial, Teske was executed in a secret part of Leipzig Prison on Alfred-Kästner-Straße, Leipzig, by executioner Hermann Lorenz. Teske was shot in the back of the head using a semi-automatic pistol, after which his body was cremated and buried at the Südfriedhof. His death certificate stated that he died of "heart failure". Knowledge of Teske's trial, execution, and funeral were all kept secret by East German authorities, and this information was withheld even from Teske's closest relatives, including his wife who did not know she was a widow until after German reunification in 1990. Until then, she had assumed her husband was being held somewhere in custody.

== Posthumous rehabilitation ==
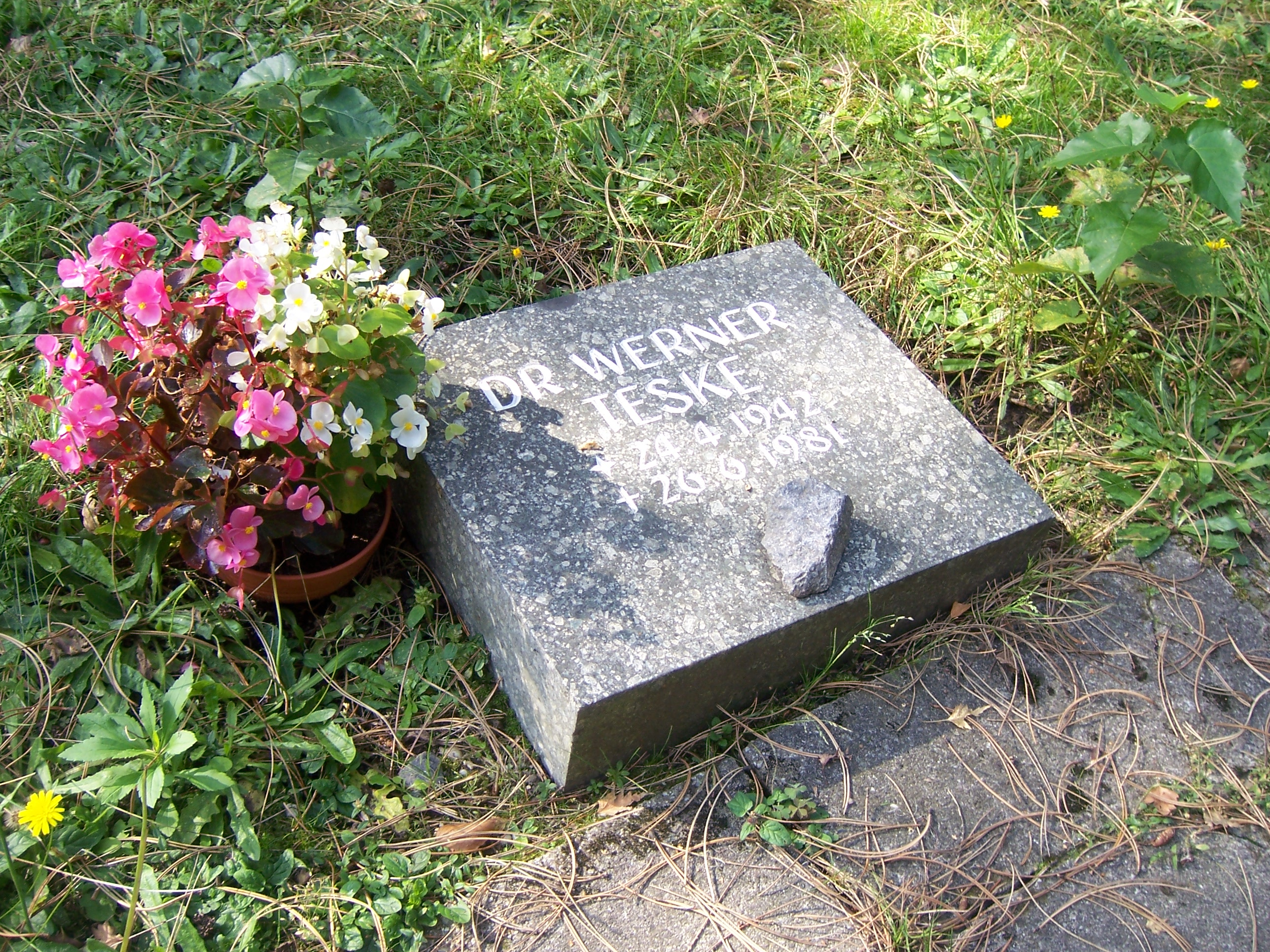
Teske's grave at the Südfriedhof, Leipzig

After German reunification, the sentence against Teske was overturned in 1993. Subsequently, the judges and prosecutors who had taken part in Teske's trial were prosecuted themselves, and in 1998, judge Karl-Heinz Knoche and prosecutor Heinz Kadgien were sentenced to four years imprisonment for perverting the course of justice. These new rulings were justified by the fact that the original decision had been disproportionate according to East German law, as while Teske did plan to defect, he never actually committed the offenses he was sentenced for.

Teske was the last person to be executed in East Germany before the death penalty was abolished in 1987, effectively becoming the last person to be executed in Germany.

The story of the 2021 film The Last Execution by Franziska Stünkel is based on aspects of the lives of Teske and the footballer Lutz Eigendorf.
