= Die großen Kriminalfälle =

- Country of origin: Germany
- No. of episodes: 41

Production
- Running time: 40-45 minutes

Original release
- Network: Das Erste
- Release: 2000 – 2012

Die großen Kriminalfälle ("The Great Criminal Cases") is a German documentary television series. It first aired in 2000, since then 41 episodes have been produced. Each episode is about one famous criminal case in German post-war history.
