= SS blood group tattoo =

German WWII tattoos indicating blood type

SS blood group tattoos (German: Blutgruppentätowierung) were worn by members of the SS-Verfügungstruppe, SS-Totenkopfverbände, and most of the Waffen-SS in Nazi Germany during World War II to identify the individual's blood type. After the war, the tattoo was taken to be prima facie evidence of being part of the Waffen-SS, leading to potential arrest and prosecution.

== Description and purpose ==
The SS blood group tattoo was applied, in theory, to all Waffen-SS members, except members of the British Free Corps. It was a small black ink tattoo located on the underside of the left arm near the armpit. It generally measured around 7 millimetres (1/4 in) long and was placed roughly 20 centimetres (8 in) above the elbow. The tattoo consisted of the soldier's blood type letter, either A, B, AB or O. The discovery of the Rh D antigen had been made in 1937, but was not fully understood during World War II, so was not implemented. In the early part of the war, tattoos were printed in Fraktur, while later on they were printed in Antiqua.

The purpose of the tattoo was to identify a soldier's blood type in case a blood transfusion was needed while unconscious, or his Erkennungsmarke (dog tag) or Soldbuch (pay book) were missing. The tattoo was generally applied by the unit's Sanitäter (medic) in basic training but could have been applied by anyone assigned to do it at any time during his term of service.

== Usage ==
Not all Waffen-SS men had the tattoo, particularly those who had transferred from other branches of the military to the Waffen-SS, or those who transferred from the Allgemeine SS, the "General" or non-military SS. Some non-SS men also had the tattoo: if a member of a branch of the Wehrmacht was treated in an SS hospital, he would often have the tattoo applied.

Although the tattoo was widely used in the early war years, over the course of the war it was gradually applied to fewer and fewer soldiers, and towards the end of the war, having the tattoo was more the exception than the rule. The application of the tattoo to foreign volunteers was apparently an issue of contention with some, such as the British Free Corps, not required to have it, while other foreign units did not object. Very little specific information exists regarding the tattoo and foreign units, but it is claimed by some that the men of the 33rd Waffen Grenadier Division of the SS Charlemagne (1st French) had the tattoo applied. The archives of the Lille judicial police show that most of the men of the French Waffen-SS were tattooed. Out of a sample of 90 men, 73 indicated that they had been tattooed. Five attempted to remove their tattoos, one by burning it with a hot iron, the second with silver nitrate. One refused the tattoo, demonstrating that it was possible to refuse. Johann Voss of the 6th SS Mountain Division Nord and author of Black Edelweiss, did not have the tattoo applied because he was visiting his father on that particular day, although the rest of his training company did.

== Postwar ==
When the war ended, the Allies were keen to catch all Waffen-SS members on account of the high volume of war crimes committed by some units. The blood group tattoo helped greatly in identifying former members, leading to their prosecution and, in some cases, their execution.

Because of the lack of perfect consistency between having the tattoo and having served in the Waffen-SS, some SS veterans were able to escape detection. Some members of the SS who evaded capture in part because they did not have the blood group tattoo included Josef Mengele and Alois Brunner.

Towards the end of the war and after, some (former) SS members tried to remove their blood group tattoos by various means, including surgery, self-inflicted burns and even shooting themselves there.

In the post-war period, the existence of the tattoo was used by US immigration officials to identify former Nazis and deny them entry to the United States.

== See also ==
- Identification of inmates in German concentration camps
