= Capital punishment in Germany =

Europe comprises almost entirely abolitionist states (shown in blue, up to date as of 2025) Abolished for all offences Abolished in practice Retains capital punishment

Capital punishment in Germany has been abolished for all crimes and is prohibited by the German constitution. It was abolished in West Germany in 1949, in the Saarland in 1956 (as part of Saarland joining West Germany and becoming a state of West Germany), and in East Germany in 1987. The last person executed in Germany was Werner Teske, who was executed in 1981 at Leipzig Prison in East Germany.

== Current legal position ==
The current German constitution came into effect in 1949 and abolished capital punishment under Article 102, which states: "Die Todesstrafe ist abgeschafft." ("Capital punishment is abolished.")

Constitutional jurists have continued to debate whether Article 102 prohibits all targeted killing by the state (such as during a hostage situation, for example) when read in light of Paragraph 2 of Article 2, which states: "every person shall have the right to life and physical integrity."

There has been debate over whether Article 102 may be amended or repealed by a two-thirds majority in the Bundestag and Bundesrat. Paragraph 3 of Article 79 of the constitution expressly prohibits amendments of Articles 1 and 20, which suggests that Article 102 may be amended or repealed. However, some legal scholars have argued that the prohibition of capital punishment necessarily follows from Article 2, and Article 102 merely puts the prohibition beyond doubt. It has also been argued that Article 102, being a constitutional provision, does not guarantee a basic right but only enacts a judicial restriction. In 1995, the German Federal Court of Justice argued that capital punishment ought to be considered inadmissible because it would be a violation of constitutional guarantee of human dignity in Article 1.

The penal code was formally amended in 1951 to conform to the abolition mandated by the constitution. (Note: This did not lead to a change of the law-as-in-force itself, as that had taken place immediately with the enactment of the constitution.) Prior death sentences were commuted to life imprisonment. The constitution requires that prisoners have a chance of regaining freedom by means other than extralegal pardon, (Note: As ruled by the Federal Constitutional Court in 1977.) so prisoners are assessed for parole at regular 15-year intervals. Since the introduction of this provision, courts may declare a "special gravity of guilt" in extreme cases to pursue life without parole. (Note: Though some realistic hope for regaining freedom must still be guaranteed.)

In its verdict on the attempt to ban the National Democratic Party of Germany in 2017, the German Federal Constitutional Court considered the party's demand for a referendum on the reintroduction of capital punishment as anti-constitutional and incompatible with the liberal democratic basic order.

=== Hesse and Bavaria ===
Although Article 21.1 of the Constitution of Hesse provided capital punishment for high crimes, this provision was moot due to the federal constitutional abolition of the death penalty. (Note: Article 31 of the German constitution reads "Bundesrecht bricht Landesrecht", 'federal law shall take precedence over Land law.') (Note: It would also be inactive today because there is no implementing penal law.) The capital punishment provision was finally scrapped from Hesse's state constitution in 2018 by popular vote, with 83% of the votes in favour of removing the provision.

The Constitution of Bavaria contained rules for implementing capital punishment (Note: Article 47 IV 2 (old form) of the Bavarian constitution stated the execution of capital punishment requires previous confirmation by the government.) until they were abrogated by a constitutional amendment in 1998.

== History ==
=== Holy Roman Empire ===
In the Holy Roman Empire, high justice was originally reserved for the king. Beginning in the 13th century, it was transferred to the king's vassals along with their fiefs. The first codification of capital punishment was the Halsgerichtsordnung (lit. 'neck court rules') passed by Maximilian I in 1499, followed in 1507 by the Constitutio Criminalis Bambergensis. Both codes formed the basis of the Constitutio Criminalis Carolina (CCC), passed in 1532 under Charles V. In the Habsburg monarchy, all regional codes were superseded by the Constitutio Criminalis Theresiana in 1768.

=== Confederation and Reich 1849–1933 ===
If the German constitution enacted by the Frankfurt Parliament in 1849 had come into force, capital punishment would have been abolished in most cases, since article III, paragraph 139 of that constitution stated: "die Todesstrafe, ausgenommen wo das Kriegsrecht sie vorschreibt, oder das Seerecht im Fall von Meutereien sie zuläßt, [...], [ist] abgeschafft" ('Capital punishment, except when it is prescribed by martial law or permitted by the law of the seas in cases of mutiny, [...] [is] abolished'). These lines were removed from the constitution during the Erfurt Union of 1849-1850.

Historian Christopher Clark noted that the death penalty was not very prevalent in Prussia. His work compared the number of executions in Prussia to the number in England and Wales in the first half of the 19th century, which together had about the same population as Prussia. Every year, England and Wales executed about sixteen times as many people. While in Prussia the death penalty was usually applied only in murder cases, the English also executed people for theft, sometimes even in minor cases, under the so-called Bloody Code.

With the unification of Germany into the German Empire in 1871 and the introduction of the national Strafgesetzbuch, abolition was sincerely considered, but execution was maintained. Various states inflicted the death penalty for some forms of high treason and for murder. Murder was defined as killing with premeditation; only murder or attempted murder of one's sovereign was capital treason. (Note: According to § 80, 211 StGB 1871, sovereign was not only the emperor, but also the prince of both one's own state and the state of momentary sojourn.)

Under military law, in case of war only, the death penalty applied for some other particularly listed forms of treason, some cases of wrongful surrender, desertion in the field in case of relapse (if the previous desertion also had taken place in the field), cowardice if it led to a flight with enticing one's comrades to flight, explicitly disobeying an order by word or deed in the face of the enemy, sedition in the face of the enemy, or in the field (only) if done as a ringleader or instigator, or with violence as a leading man. (Note: According to the Militär-Strafgesetzbuch für das Deutsche Reich (MStGB).) During the German empire, the legal methods used for capital punishment were the hand-held axe, in some states also the guillotine for civilian crimes, and the firing squad for military crimes.

According to Manfred Messerschmidt, "from 1907 to 1932, Germany had issued 1,547 death warrants, of which 393 were executed." The Weimar Republic, after serious debate, retained the death penalty for murder, and several murderers were guillotined, including notorious child murderers Peter Kürten and Fritz Haarmann, but was otherwise relatively infrequent.

=== Nazi Germany ===
The leading Nazi jurist, Hans Frank, boasted at the 1934 Reichsparteitag of "ruthlessly administering the death penalty" as a special acquisition of the Nazi regime. Under Hitler, nearly 40,000 death sentences were handed down, mainly by the Volksgerichtshof and also by the Reich Military Tribunal.

Executions were carried out most often by decapitation using the guillotine, which in 1936 was ordained as the official means of civil execution of capital punishment. From 1942, short-drop hanging was also used, notoriously in the reprisals in the aftermath of the 20 July plot. Firing squads were reserved for military offenders.

The definition of murder was changed and, in practice, extended to still in force (although now with the penalty being life imprisonment). Among the crimes subject to mandatory capital punishment, the following non-exhaustive list illustrates the breadth of crimes concerned:

- Declared treason (Note: Mandatory death penalty for soldiers.)
- Grave arson (Note: As enacted by the Reichstag Fire Decree. A further law, the Lex van der Lubbe, provided retrospective application so that Marinus van der Lubbe could be "executed".)
- Aiding and abetting treason
- Betraying a secret
- Procuring a secret for the sake of betraying it
- Insidious publishing or rhetoric
- Failure to denounce a capital crime
- Destroying means for military use
- Sabotage
- Kidnapping (Note: cf. the respective forms of the Strafgesetzbuch.)
- Compassing or imagining the death of a Nazi or state official for political reasons or the reason of their service (Note: Law for the upholding of the legal peace, § 1.)
- Setting a car trap for the means of robbery
- Espionage
- Partisanry
- Desertion
- Subversion of military strength (Note: Mandatory except for minor cases; see Kriegssonderstrafrechtsverordnung.)
- Looting (Note: Mandatory even in cases of smallest offending.)
- Arson which damages the defence of the people
- Crime during danger resulting from enemy aviation (in grave cases)
- Taking advantage of the state of war whilst committing a crime ("if the sound common sense of the people so requires")
- Publishing foreign radio broadcasts

Many of the crimes covered a wide range of actions. Crimes like treason, sabotage (Kriegsverrat, which was any action of pandering to the enemy) and subversion of the military strength, which could be interpreted as to cover any critical remark, and was applied to any conscientious objector.

In addition to crimes declared capital by law or decree, a "dangerous habitual criminal" or individual convicted of rape could be executed "if the protection of the people or the need for just atonement so demands". (Note: Law of 1941 for the amendment of the Penal Code, § 1.) Courts (or whatever was in place instead of a court) sometimes were officially granted the right to inflict capital punishment, even where not provided by law, and sometimes did so by their own discretion, in line with Hitler who said;

after ten years of hard prison, a man is lost to the people's community anyway. Thus what to do with such a guy is either put him into a concentration camp, or kill him. In latest times the latter is more important, for the sake of deterrence.

During 1933–1945, Wehrmacht courts issued at least 25,000 death warrants, of which 18,000 to 20,000 were executed. According to official statistics, other courts had altogether issued 16,560 death warrants (contrasting with 664 before the war), of which about 12,000 were executed. In fighting partisans, 345,000 are reported to have been killed, of which fewer than 10% may have been partisans. However, Heinrich Himmler offered SS members convicted of capital crimes the option to commit suicide with a pistol. Surviving family were given pensions.

Aside from the use of capital punishment in legal contexts, death was a permanent feature of the concentration camp system and the broader police state, particularly the Gestapo. In concentration camps, commanders could, as early as 1933, sentence prisoners to death for "disobedience" without needing to provide any additional justification or explanation.

A 2017 study found that,

judges more committed to the Nazi Party were more likely to impose the death sentence on defendants belonging to organised political opposition groups, those accused of violent resistance and those with characteristics to which Nazism was intolerant.

=== After World War II ===
After World War II, hundreds of executions of both common and war criminals were carried out in West Germany. However, the majority were carried out by the Allied occupation authorities, not by German authorities. The last to be executed in the Western Zones under German authority were Richard Schuh on 18 February 1949 for murder and robbery, and on 9 May 1949, 29-year-old Robert Amelung and 39-year-old Peter Steinhauer were guillotined in Hamburg for murder.

The last execution in West Berlin was of Berthold Wehmeyer on 12 May 1949 for murder, rape, and robbery. That same year, an opinion poll found that 77% of Germans were in favour of capital punishment while 18% opposed it. Despite protests by the newly established Federal Republic of Germany, the Western Allied powers continued to practice capital punishment in their separate jurisdictions. The last seven condemned men, all of whom were war criminals, were executed by the US military at Landsberg Prison on 7 June 1951.

In 2005, journalist Charles Lane wrote that many Germans, then and now, claimed that West Germany had thoroughly learned a lesson from the Nazi era, pointing to its abolishment of capital punishment as an example. However, Lane said the real reason West Germany abolished capital punishment early-on was to protect Nazi war criminals from execution. Many members of the West German parliament were surprised when Hans-Christoph Seebohm, the leader of the far-right German Party, introduced a motion to abolish capital punishment in 1948.

In his speech to his fellow legislators, Seebohm equated executions by the Nazi regime to executions "after 1945" – those of war criminals. According to British historian Richard J. Evans, Seebohm:

was thinking primarily of the executions of the war criminals, against which he and his party had so clearly opposed. Preventing Nazi war criminals from being sentenced to death would no doubt lure more voters to the extreme right for the NPD.

The SPD and CDU initially both rejected the proposal. The SPD rejected it since nearly 80 percent of the West German public supported the death penalty, while CDU politicians rejected it since most of them personally supported it for common criminals. However, both parties started to see the advantages of the proposal. For the SPD, Seebohm gave them cover for an objective they were too afraid to pursue on their own, whereas for more than half of those in the CDU, the political advantages of shielding Nazi war criminals from execution overrode their support for capital punishment. After West Germany abolished capital punishment via Article 102, the West German government immediately started lobbying for clemency for all Nazi war criminals who were on death row under Allied military law, citing the new law. Lane noted that as late as 1960, polls showed that 71% of the West German public supported the reinstatement of capital punishment, which the CDU unsuccessfully tried to do.

==== German Democratic Republic ====
East Germany abolished capital punishment in 1987. By then, East German courts had imposed death sentences in 227 cases. 166 were executed, of which 52 for assumedly political crimes such as espionage and sabotage, 64 for war crimes in Nazi Germany and 44 for common criminality (mostly murder under aggravated circumstances). Most of these took place during the 1950s; three known executions took place in the 70s and two in the 80s. The guillotine (called the Fallschwertmaschine, lit. 'falling sword machine') was last used in 1967 (for the execution of sexual offender Günter Herzfeld), after which it was replaced with execution by shooting (unerwarteter Nahschuss in das Hinterhaupt, 'unexpected close shot in the back of the head'). The last civilian executed was Erwin Hagedorn in 1972, for sexually motivated serial child murder. The last execution in East Germany is believed to be Werner Teske, who was convicted for treason, in 1981.

== See also ==
- Blutgericht
- Constitutio Criminalis Carolina
- Capital punishment worldwide

== Sources ==
- "Death Penalty: German State Hesse Scraps Death Penalty Anomaly". BBC News. 2 November 2018.
- Boll, Bernd [in German] (19 December 2005). "Der Kampf an der inneren Front" [The Fight on the Inner Front]. Deutschlandradio (in German). Archived from the original on 7 March 2023. "Bernd Boll über Manfred Messerschmidt: Die Wehrmachtjustiz 1933-1945. Der Band ist erschienen im Ferdinand Schöningh Verlag in Paderborn, 511 Seiten."
- Bundesgerichtshof (16 November 1995). "BGH, Urteil vom 16. 11. 1995 – 5 StR 747/94; LG Berlin". lexetius.com (in German). "Die staatliche Organisation einer Vollstreckung der Todesstrafe ist schließlich, gemessen am Ideal der Menschenwürde, ein schlechterdings unzumutbares und unerträgliches Unterfangen. [...] Diese Bedenken legen den Befund nahe, daß nach deutschem Verfassungsrecht jegliche Wiedereinführung der Todesstrafe – auch abgehen von Art. 102 GG – vor Art. 1 Abs. 1 GG und der Wesensgehaltsgarantie des Grundrechts auf Leben (Art. 2 Abs. 2 Satz 1 i. V. m. Art. 19 Abs. 2 GG) keinen Bestand haben könnte [...]."
- "Hinrichtungen in Leipzig". Runde Ecke Leipzig (in German). Bürgerkomitee Leipzig.
- Clark, Christopher M. (2007). Preußen. Aufstieg und Niedergang. 1600–1947 [Iron Kingdom: the Rise and Downfall of Prussia, 1600-1947] (in German). Bonn: BpB. ISBN 9783893317868.
- Curilla, Wolfgang (2006). Die deutsche Ordnungspolizei und der Holocaust im Baltikum und Weißrussland 1941-1944 (in German). Paderborn.
- Deutscher Bundestag (22 March 2025). Bundesamt für Justiz (ed.). "Grundgesetz für die Bundesrepublik Deutschland" [Basic Law for the Federal Republic of Germany] (in German). Berlin: Bundesministerium der Justiz und für Verbraucherschutz – via Gesetze im Internet.
- "Das Ende der Todesstrafe" [The End of the Death Penalty]. Deutsche Welle (in German). 18 February 2009.
- Dynomight (22 November 2021). "How Germany banned the death penalty". Dynomight.
- Evans, Richard J. (2001). Rituale der Vergeltung [Rituals of Retaliation] (in German). Berlin: Kindler Verlag. ISBN 3463404001. OL 12728315M.
- Federal Constitutional Court (17 January 2017). "Judgment of the Second Senate of 17 January 2017 - 2 BvB 1/13". Karlsruhe: Federal Constitutional Court.
- Frank, Hans (13 April 2026) [September 1934]. Die Einwirkung des nationalsozialistischen Ideengutes auf das deutsche Rechtsleben [The Impact of National Socialist Thinking on the German Legal System]. Der Kongreß zu Nürnberg vom 5. bis 10. September 1934. Munich: Eher Verlag. pp. 187–192.
- Frei, Norbert (2002). Adenauer's Germany and the Nazi Past: The Politics of Amnesty and Integration. Translated by Golb, Joel. New York: Columbia University Press. ISBN 0-231-11882-1. LCCN 2002073502. OCLC 465390895. OL 9355547M.
- Geerling, Wayne; Magee, Gary; Mishra, Vinod; Smyth, Russell (1 March 2017). "Hitler's Judges: Ideological Commitment and the Death Penalty in Nazi Germany" (PDF). The Economic Journal. 128 (614): 2414–2449. doi:10.1111/ecoj.12497. ISSN 1468-0297. S2CID 158003419.
- German Bundestag (22 March 2025). Basic Law for the Federal Republic of Germany (PDF). Translated by Tomuschat, Christian; Currie, David P. Berlin: German Bundestag.
- "Grim Penal Code". The Glasgow Herald. 6 February 1940. p. 9.
- Iken, Katja (18 February 2019). "Todesstrafe für Richard Schuh: Letzte Hinrichtung durch westdeutsche Justiz". Der Spiegel (in German). ISSN 2195-1349.
- Herzog, Roman (1987). "Todesstrafe I. Rechtlich B. Verfassungsrechtlich". Evangelisches Staatslexikon (in German). Vol. 2 (3rd ed.). Stuttgart: Kreuz-Verlag. ISBN 3783108101. OCLC 243710192.
- Kellerhoff, Sven-Felix (24 November 2021) [2019-05-11]. "Das letzte Fallbeil fiel in der "Irrenabteilung" Moabit" [The Last Fall Hat Fell in the "insane Department" Moabit]. Die Welt (in German).
- Kirchschlager, Michael (25 January 2013). "Todesurteile in der DDR 1959 bis 1981". Kriminalia.de (in German).
- Kühn, Hermann Christoph (2001). "Schutz vor Todesstrafe im Ausland" (PDF). Zeitschrift für Rechtspolitik (in German). 34 (12): 542–547. JSTOR 23427065.
- "E. Germany Sets Amnesty, Abolishes Death Penalty". Los Angeles Times. 18 July 1987.
- Lane, Charles (4 June 2005). "The Paradoxes of a Death Penalty Stance". The Washington Post. ISSN 0190-8286. Archived from the original on 23 November 2022.
- "Todesstrafe in der DDR" [Death Penalty in the GDR]. Mitteldeutscher Rundfunk (in German). 24 November 2021.
- Stark, Florian (11 December 2012). "Sie töteten mit Fallbeil, Strick und Schalldämpfer" [They Killed with Guillotine, Rope and Silencer]. Die Welt (in German).
- Tschentscher, Axel (27 October 2022). "BVerfGE 45, 187 - Lebenslange Freiheitsstrafe" [BVerfGE 45, 187 - Life imprisonment]. Das Fallrecht (in German).
- Wunder, Olaf [in German] (24 March 2019). "Die Geschichte der beiden Männer, die als letzte Hamburger durch die Guillotine starben" [The Story of the Two Men Who Were the Last Hamburgers to Die Through the Guillotine]. FOCUS Online (in German). Archived from the original on 6 January 2025.
