= List of Ahnenerbe institutes =

The following is a list of the various institutes set up as subsidiary bodies of the German "Ahnenerbe" organization.

== Social Sciences ==
- Indogermanisch-arische Sprach- und Kulturwissenschaft (Indogermanic-Aryan Language and Cultural Studies), director: Walther Wüst
- Indogermanisch-germanische Sprach- und Kullturwissenschaft (Indogermanic-Germanic Language and Cultural Studies)
- Germanische Kulturwissenschaft und Landschaftskunde (Germanic Cultural Studies and Landscape Science)
- Germanische Sprachwissenschaft und Landschaftskunde (Germanic Linguistics and Landscape Science), director: Bruno Schweizer
- Indogermanische Glaubensgeschichte (Indogermanic Faith history), director: Otto Huth
- Indogermanische Rechtsgeschichte (Indogermanic Historical jurisprudence), director: Wilhelm Ebel
- Indogermanisch-deutsche Musik (Indogermanic-German Music)
- Germanisch-deutsche Volkskunde (Germanic-German Folklore)
- Deutsche Volksforschung und Volkskunde (German Ethnic Research and Folklore)
- Volkserzählung, Märchen und Sagenkunde (Folktales, Fairytales and Myths)
- Runen, Schrift und Sinnbildkunde (Runes, Alphabets, and Symbols), director: Wolfgang Krause
- Hausmarken und Sippenzeichen (House Brands and Family Marks)
- Ortung und Landschaftssinnbilder (Location and Landscape symbols)
- Ausgrabungen (Excavations), director: Herbert Jankuhn
- Germanisches Bauwesen (Germanic Architecture)
- Wurtenforschung (Dwelling Mound Research), today called Niedersächsisches Institut für historische Küstenforschung
- Urgeschichte (Prehistory)
- Keltische Volksforschung (Celtic ethnic research)
- Indogermanisch-finnische Kulturbeziehungen (Indogermanic-Finnish cultural relations), director: Yrjö von Grönhagen
- Klassische Archäologie (Classic Archaeology)
- Klassische Altertumswissenschaft (Classical Antiquity)
- Alte Geschichte (Ancient History)
- Mittlere und Neuere Geschichte (Middle and Modern History)
- Griechische Philologie (Greek Philology)
- Lateinische Philologie (Latin Philology)
- Mittellatein (Medieval Latin), director: Paul Lehmann
- Innerasien und Expeditionen (Inner Asia and Expeditions), director: Ernst Schäfer
- Vorderer Orient (Near East)
- Ostasien-Institut (East Asian Institute)
- Orientalistische Indologie (Oriental Indology)
- Nordwestafrikanische Kulturwissenschaft (Northwest African Cultural Studies)
- Philosophie (Philosophy)

== Natural Sciences ==
- Gesamte Naturwissenschaft ("Natural Science")
- Darstellende und angewandte Naturkunde ("Descriptive and Applied Natural History"), director: Eduard Paul Tratz
- Biologie ("Biology")
- Entomologie ("Entomology")
- Astronomie ("Astronomy")
- Pferdezucht ("Horse Breeding")
- Botanik ("Botany")
- Pflanzengenetik ("Plant Genetics"), director: Heinz Brücher
- Karst- und Höhlenkunde ("Speleology")
- Naturwissenschaftliche Vorgeschichte ("Scientific History")
- Tiergeographie und Tiergeschichte ("Zoogeography and Animal History")
- Angewandte Geologie ("Applied Geology")
- Geologische Zeitmessung ("Geochronology")
- Geophysik ("Geophysics")
- Kernphysik ("Nuclear Physics")
- Volksmedizin ("Folk Medicine")
- Osteologie ("Osteology")
- Überprüfung der sogenannten Geheimwissenschaften ("Examination of the so-called secret sciences"), only planned for; the institute was not established
- Wehrwissenschaftliche Zweckforschung ("Military Scientific Research"), director: Kurt Plötner, cooperated with the professors Alwin Walther and Kurt Walter

== See also ==
- Ahnenerbe
