= List of Nazi Party organizations =

A list of organizations established by or closely associated with the Nazi Party, sortable by their German or English title.

German name	English name	Description	Date founded
Ahnenerbe	Ancestral Heritage	A think tank to research the history of the Aryan race; see also List of Ahnenerbe institutes	July 1 1935
Amerikadeutscher Bund	German American Bund	An American Nazi organization	March 19 1936
Antikomintern	Anti-Comintern	An agency for anti-Soviet propaganda	1933
Bund Deutscher Mädel	League of German Girls	The female branch of the Nazi youth movement	20 April 1930
BDM Werk Glaube und Schönheit	League of German Girls Belief and Beauty Society	Organisation for girls aged 17 to 21	20 April 1938
Deutsche Arbeitsfront (DAF)	German Labour Front	Nazi trade union organization	10 May 1933
Deutsche Christenbewegung	German Christians Movement	A Nazi Christian pressure group and movement	6 June 1932
Deutsche Glaubensbewegung	German Faith Movement	A non-Christian Nazi religious movement	30 July 1933
Deutscher Radfahrer-Verband	German Cycling Association	The cycling unit of the Nationalsozialistischer Reichsbund für Leibesübungen	17 August 1884
Deutsche Verkehrsfliegerschule (DVS)	German Air Transport School	A covert military training organization	11 January 1925
Freigemeinschaft von Teutonia	Free Society of Teutonia	Pro-Nazi German American Association	October 1924
Freundeskreis der Wirtschaft	Circle of Friends of the Economy	A group of industrialists who raised funds for Nazi racial research	1932
Freunde des Neuen Deutschland	Friends of New Germany	An American Nazi organization	July 1933
Hitler Jugend	Hitler Youth	Male branch of the Nazi youth organization	
Lebensborn	Fount of Life	An organization providing financial assistance to the wives of SS members	12 December 1935
Nationalsozialistischer Reichsbund für Leibesübungen (NSRL)	National Socialist League of the Reich for Physical Exercise	Nazi organization for sports	27 July 1934
Propagandaministerium	Reich Ministry for Public Enlightenment and Propaganda	One of the terms for the main Nazi propaganda organization	13 March 1933
Schönheit der Arbeit	Beauty of Labour	A propaganda organization	27 November 1933
Schutzstaffel (SS)	Defense Squadron	A paramilitary organisation directly commanded by Adolf Hitler, associated with the genocide of European Jews	4 April 1925
