= Ilse Staiger =

German BDM leader and Reichsbeauftragte (commissioner) in the SS-Helferinnenkorps

- Born: Ilse Staiger; 1915; Württemberg, German Empire
- Occupations: BDM leader; SS-Helferin (women's auxiliary)
- Organizations: League of German Girls; SS-Helferinnenkorps
- Known for: Reichsbeauftragte (commissioner) in the SS-Helferinnenkorps

Ilse Staiger (born 1915) was a German youth leader in the League of German Girls (BDM) who, from 1943, served as the Reichsbeauftragte, the highest office open to women, in the SS-Helferinnenkorps. In that role she oversaw the "feminine affairs" and welfare of SS female communications personnel and exercised supervisory authority across SS units employing SS-Helferinnen. On 30 January 1944 she received the Silberspange für SS-Helferinnen (no. 135) for good service. After 1945 she underwent denazification and was classified as a "minderbelastet" (less implicated) offender.

== Biography ==
=== Early life and BDM career ===
She was born in Württemberg in 1915. She joined the BDM in 1934 and was employed full-time in the Hitler Youth district Württemberg–Schwaben from 1937, ultimately holding the rank of Hauptmädelführerin. She joined the Nazi Party (NSDAP) in 1938.

=== SS-Helferinnenkorps ===
In April 1943 Staiger was assigned to the Reichsschule-SS at Oberehnheim (Obernai, Alsace) as acting Heimleiterin (home director), filling in for an ill incumbent. In the autumn of 1943 she was transferred to Berlin and appointed Reichsbeauftragte in the SS-Helferinnenkorps, initially on the staff of the Chef des Fernmeldewesens and, from mid-1944, at the SS-Hauptamt.

The remit of the Reichsbeauftragte encompassed the "feminine" welfare and supervision of SS-Helferinnen: safeguarding conditions in local billets, ensuring that duty and housing regulations were followed, and addressing matters such as night work, accommodation access rules, and the future arrangements of pregnant personnel. Authority and scope were laid down in a Dienstanweisung of 11 July 1944, which expressly empowered the office to conduct inspections, consult personnel files, and obtain travel orders as needed, and provided that the Reichsbeauftragte reported to the SS leadership via the Chief of SS Signals (Chef des Fernmeldewesens). On 14 September 1944 Staiger received a deputy (identified in sources as "Ilse B."), likewise a former full-time BDM leader.

According to her post-war testimony, Staiger was briefly taken prisoner near the German–French border in January 1945 and exchanged via Switzerland, reporting back to her office in Berlin in late March 1945. During her absence in March 1945, her deputy temporarily acted as Reichsbeauftragte.

Staiger was awarded the Silberspange für SS-Helferinnen, the silver clasp for SS-Helferinnen, for "good service" on 30 January 1944; the award register lists clasp no. 135.

A planned successor to her office was Julia op ten Noort (selected in December 1944), who was never installed. The office (Dienststelle der Reichsbeauftragten) was in Berlin; the post itself was newly created in autumn 1943.

=== Denazification and later life ===
Staiger was not interned after the war. In September 1947 the Brackenheim Spruchkammer classified her as a Minderbelastete (lesser offender); records also place her residence in Stuttgart at that time. A case for "Meldebogenfälschung" (false declaration on denazification forms) regarding non-disclosure of SS affiliation resulted in her acquittal on 3 February 1949 by the Amtsgericht Heilbronn; a clemency petition of 9 September 1948 was denied on 1 June 1949. Her post-war employment was limited by the process.

== Assessment ==
Historiography highlights that the position of Reichsbeauftragte was the apex of authority attainable by women in the SS-Helferinnenkorps and frames it within the SS "Sippengemeinschaft" and gendered division of labour. Contemporary scholarship notes that Staiger advised Himmler "in fraulichen Belangen" (on women's matters) and exemplifies the integration of female personnel into SS administration and communications services. Earlier overviews of the Reichsschule-SS and the helper corps list Staiger among the successive office-holders from late 1943.

== Bibliography ==
- Meyer, S. (2014, January 7). Diese Frauen waren auch Täterinnen. Die Welt. https://www.welt.de/print/die_welt/politik/article124325377/Diese-Frauen-waren-auch-Taeterinnen.html
- Mühlenberg, J. (2012). Das SS-Helferinnenkorps: Ausbildung, Einsatz und Entnazifizierung der weiblichen Angehörigen der Waffen-SS 1942–1949. Hamburg: Hamburger Edition.
- Seidler, F. (1978). Frauen zu den Waffen? Marketenderinnen, Helferinnen, Soldatinnen. Koblenz: Bernard & Graefe.
