= Yrjö von Grönhagen =

Finnish anthropologist (1911–2003)

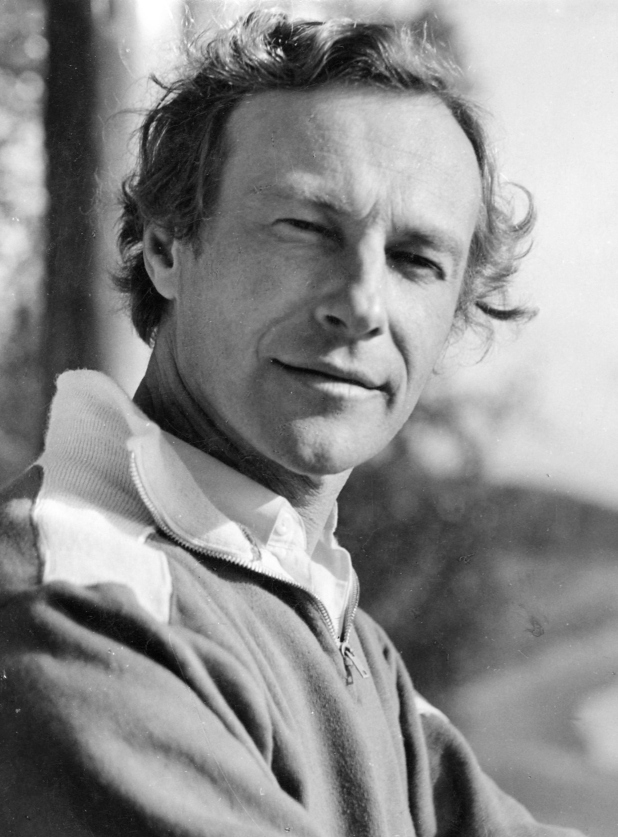
- Grönhagen in the 1950s
- Born: 3 October 1911; Saint Petersburg, Russian Empire
- Died: 17 October 2003 (aged 92); Helsinki, Finland
- Education: University of Helsinki, University of Sorbonne
- Scientific career
- Fields: Anthropology
- Workplaces: Ahnenerbe

Yrjö von Grönhagen (3 October 1911 – 17 October 2003) was a Finnish nobleman and anthropologist. He is best known on his 1930s work at the Nazi pseudoscientific institute Ahnenerbe.

== Life ==
Grönhagen was born in Saint Petersburg, in the Saint Petersburg Governorate of the Russian Empire. His father was an officer at the Imperial Russian Army. After the 1917 October Revolution Grönhagen family fled to the Finnish town of Viipuri. He graduated from University of Helsinki and studied later at the University of Sorbonne in Paris.

In 1935, the German newspaper Frankfurter Volksblatt published Grönhagen's article on Kalevala folklore. Reichsführer-SS Heinrich Himmler showed interest on his thoughts and asked Grönhagen to work for Ahnenerbe. He led a 1936 Finnish-German voyage through Karelia. This expedition mostly recorded pagan sorcerers and witches. In 1937 and 1938 Grönhagen made two more voyages to Karelia, alone this time. He also worked shortly as one of the institute's directors but was dismissed by professor Walter Wüst who considered Grönhagen incompetent.

During World War II, the Nazi-minded Grönhagen worked for Finland's propaganda department and served as its military attaché in Berlin. He was arrested in Oslo 1945 and held in custody for two years. After his release Grönhagen was a businessman and emigrated to Greece in 1964. He first lived in Crete and later in Athens serving as the Master of the Christian Order Ordo Sancti Constantini Magni.

== Works ==
- Finnische Gespräche, Norland Verlag, Berlin, 1941.
- Karelien, Finnlands Bollwerk gegen den Osten, Franz Muller Verlag, Dresden, 1942.
- Das Antlitz Finnlands, Wiking GmbH, Berlin, 1942.
- Himmlerin salaseura, Kansankirja, Helsinki, 1948.

== See also ==
- Finnlands Lebensraum
