= James R. Dow =

- Born: January 2, 1936; Mississippi
- Occupations: Scholar of folklore, professor

Academic background
- Education: Mississippi College (B.A.); University of Iowa (MA), (Ph.D.)

Academic work
- Discipline: Folklore & linguistics
- Institutions: Iowa State University; University of Wyoming

James R. Dow is a Professor Emeritus of German at Iowa State University with research interests in German Volkskunde (folklore), Old Order Amish of Kalona and Amana Colonists of Amana. He took his doctorate from the University of Iowa in German literature in 1966. He taught at University of Wyoming before taking his permanent post at Iowa State University in Ames, Iowa. Dow served for ten years as the editor of the Internationale Volkskundliche Bibliographie. He was also guest professor at the University of Bremen in Germany. He was awarded a Guggenheim Fellowship in 2005 for the study and grammar of the Cimbrian language, resulting in a highly regarded book Dow edited by the late Bruno Schweizer.

== Books ==
- Heinrich Himmler’s Cultural Commissions: Programmed Plunder in Italy and Yugoslavia. Madison: University of Wisconsin Press, 2018.
- Olaf Bockhorn and James R. Dow, The Study of European Ethnology in Austria (Progress in European Ethnology). Aldershot UK: Ashgate Publishers, 2004, reprinted: Routledge, 2017.
- James R. Dow, Roger Welsch (eds.), Wyoming Folklore: Reminiscences, Folktales, Beliefs, Customs, and Folk Speech. Federal Writers' Project. Lincoln: University of Nebraska Pr., 2010.
- Bruno Schweizer, Zimbrische Gesamtgrammatik. Vergleichende Darstellung der zimbrischen Dialekte, James R. Dow (ed.). Stuttgart: Franz Steiner Verlag, 2008.
- Anthony S. Mercatante, James R. Dow, Encyclopedia of World Mythology and Legend (revised third edition), Facts on File, 2008.
- James R. Dow, German Folklore : A Handbook. Greenwood Publishers, 2006.
- James R. Dow, Michelle Wolff (eds.), Languages and Lives: Essays in Honor of Werner Enninger. Frankfurt: Peter Lang, 1996.
- James R. Dow, The Nazification of an Academic Discipline: Folklore in the Third Reich, Hannjost Lixfeld (Translator). Bloomington: Indiana University Press, 1994.
- Hannjost Lixfeld, James R. Dow, Folklore and Fascism: The Reich Institute for German "Volkskunde". Bloomington: Indiana UP, 1994.
- James R. Dow, Thomas Stolz (eds.) Minoritätensprachen/Sprachminoritäten. Bochum: Brockmeyer Universitätsverlag, 1991.
- James Dow, Ofelia Garcia, David F. Marshall (eds.), Focus on Bilingual Education - Language and Ethnicity and Ethnicity 2nd Language: Essays in Honor of Joshua A. Fishman. Amsterdam: John Benjamins Publishing Company, 1991.
- James R. Dow, Hannjost Lixfeld, German Volkskunde: A Decade of Theoretical Confrontation, Debate, and Reorientation (1967-1977). Bloomington: Indiana UP, 1986.
- James R. Dow, International Folklore Bibliography for 1979 and 1980. La Societe International d'Ethnologie et De Folklore, 1985.

== Selected articles ==
- James R. Dow, "In Search of All Things Nordic, in South Tyrol (Italy): The SS Ancestral Inheritance's Cultural Commission 1940-1943" in: Journal of American Folklore, 127:506 (2014): 365–399.
- James R. Dow, "Hans Naumann's gesunkenes Kulturgut and primitive Gemeinschaftskultur" in: Journal of Folklore Research 51:1 (January/April 2014): 49–100.
- James R. Dow, "Bruno Schweizer's Commitment to the Langobardian Thesis" in: Kolloquium über Alte Sprachen und Sprachstufen. Beiträge zum Bremer Kolloquium über „Alte Sprachen und Sprachstufen,“ Thomas Stolz (ed.) (In the series: Diversitas Linguarum, vol. 8). Bochum: Brockmeyer Universitätsverlag, 2004: 43–54.
- James R. Dow, "Nazi-deutsch/Nazi German: An English Lexicon of the Language of the Third Reich" in: Journal of Linguistic Anthropology 14:2 (2004): 292–293.
- James R. Dow, “Nazi Volkskunde and Photography in South Tyrol: Thoughts on an Exhibition and Conference in Dietenheim (Italy), June 28–30, 2001” in: American Folklore Society News 31:2 (2001): 7–15.
- James R. Dow, "Bezeugung als Sprechereignis bei den Amanaiten" in: Minoritätensprachen/Sprachminoritäten. Bochum: Brockmeyer Universitätsverlag, 1991: 153–168.
- James R. Dow, “German Volkskunde and National Socialism” in: Journal of American Folklore 100:397 (1987): 300–304.
