= Otto Huth =

German historian (1906–1988)

Otto Huth (9 May 1906 – 1998) was a German historian of religion and folklorist who was a member of the Ahnenerbe and held a professorial position at the Nazi Reichsuniversität Straßburg.

== Early life and education ==
Huth was the son of a neurologist who was a friend of the völkisch publisher Eugen Diederichs. His sister later married Otto Rössler, who headed the Ahnenerbe division of African studies. Born and educated in Bonn, he earned his PhD in 1932 from the University of Bonn under the supervision of Carl Clemen, with a dissertation on the Roman god Janus, and his habilitation in 1939 from the University of Tübingen after the intervention of Jakob Wilhelm Hauer.

== Career ==
In 1929, while studying at the University of Marburg, Huth met Herman Wirth, who in July 1935 founded the SS-affiliated research organisation, the Ahnenerbe. After completing his doctorate, he became Wirth's assistant and helped with the organisation of his 1933 exhibition, Der Heilbringer, on the supposed ancient spiritual heritage of the Nordic culture. In March 1937, as Wirth was becoming increasingly sidelined in the Ahnenerbe, Huth joined it. The following April, he was named provisional head of the section on Indo-European religion (Indogermanische Geistes- und Glaubensgeschichte) and was confirmed as director after his habilitation. Huth had joined the German Völkisch Freedom Party and later the SA in the 1920s; he joined the Nazi Party also in late 1939, and the SS in 1940, where he was promoted to Untersturmführer in 1941 and to Obersturmführer in November 1943.

Following his habilitation, Huth was a dozent at Tübingen. On 1 April 1942, he was appointed professor and head of the institute of religious science (Allgemeine Religionswissenschaft) at the Nazi Reichsuniversität Straßburg in Strasbourg in annexed Alsace, where he led the main seminar for early history and antiquities. The Strasbourg institute was tasked with bolstering the case for Alsace's being culturally a part of Germany, and beginning in 1943, Huth also worked with Hans-Ernst Schneider in the Germanischer Wissenschaftseinsatz, a wartime SS programme to strengthen "Germanic" worldviews in other so-called Nordic countries under German occupation, such as the Netherlands and Norway. For example, he participated as a re-education speaker with Walther Wüst at an SS camp near Strasbourg in an abortive attempt to persuade deported students from the University of Oslo to become collaborators.

Huth was among faculty and staff of the Strasbourg university who fled to Tübingen in advance of the Allies retaking the city in late 1944. After the war, he claimed that the Ahnenerbe stood outside the politics of the Third Reich and that its research was humanistic and its publications fostered "spiritual resistance". Barred from teaching, he worked in the University of Tübingen library as a specialist in theology and religious studies until his retirement in 1971. He died in Tübingen in 1998.

== Research interests and publications ==
Huth was influenced by Ludwig Klages' theory of a unity of body and soul that had been destroyed by intellectualism. In 1934, he became a member of the leadership of the German Faith Movement, representing a research group focussed on Klages' work, the Arbeitskreis für biozentrische Forschung; in 1936, he published Die Fällung des Lebensbaumes, an anti-Christian polemic in which he argued that the Christianisation of the Germanic peoples was an act of intentional cultural destruction against a unified spirituality derived from their Indo-European heritage.

Huth's research throughout his career focussed on perceived continuities between Indo-European and Germanic religion. On Wirth's recommendation, in the 1930s he received grants from the Notgemeinschaft der Deutschen Wissenschaft to study the myth of the divine twins and the Indo-European fire cult.He posited a Germanic cult of fire related to ancestor worship and derived from the Indo-European heritage. His arguments were tautological; in Der Lichterbaum (1938), copies of which were presented by Heinrich Himmler to the members of his personal staff as Yule gifts in 1937, he interpreted the almost complete absence of attestations of Christmas trees prior to the late 19th century as evidence of Christian suppression of a Germanic precursor. His Habilitationsschrift on the Germanic fire-cult, in which he argued that Germanic religion included Vestal virgins, was published as Vesta in 1943; at a public debate at the University of Berlin in 1934 where he spoke in support of Wirth, his mention of Germanic Vestals elicited laughter. In addition to his books, he published almost 30 articles and numerous reviews between 1933 and 1945 in the Ahnenerbe journal Germanien.

After the discovery of Guanche mummies on Tenerife in 1933, Huth took their blond hair as an indication of their having been "Nordic". Himmler granted him permission to lead an archaeological expedition to the Canary Islands in 1939, but the expedition had to be cancelled because of political tensions with Francisco Franco of Spain at the onset of war.
