= Eystein Eggen =

Norwegian writer

Eystein Eggen (5 January 1944 in Oslo – 19 November 2010) was a Norwegian writer. Eggen was from a family with several other contemporary Norwegian writers.

Eggen made his debut with a book about the life and death of general Carl Gustav Fleischer, the Norwegian commander in chief at Narvik during the Battles of Narvik in 1940. He also wrote a portrait of the writer Agnar Mykle, his father-in-law. Eggen wrote novels with topics from medieval Norway. In 1993 Eggen published The boy from Gimle—the autobiographical story of a Norwegian childhood in a Nazi milieu. As a consequence, two years later the Norwegian war children got an official excuse. Eggen became a State Scholar in 2003. "He is a symbol of an entire generation", the spokesman for the Norwegian Labour Party said in parliament.

Eggen's father was the Norwegian editor-in-chief of the Leitheft's Norse version during World War II.
