= SS-Helferinnenkorps =

SS Women's Auxiliary Corps, 1942–1945

- Active: 1942–8 May 1945
- Country: Nazi Germany
- Branch: Waffen-SS
- Type: Women's auxiliary (signals and clerical)
- Role: Communications and administrative support
- Size: Unknown; estimates c. 2,700–10,000; ≥2,375 documented members of Waffen-SS
- Part of: SS Chief of Telecommunications (to 1944); SS Main Office (from 1944)
- Training school: Reichsschule-SS, Oberehnheim (Obernai), Alsace

Commanders
- Notable commanders: Reichsbeauftragte Ilse Staiger (1943–1945)

The SS-Helferinnenkorps (lit. 'SS Women's Auxiliary Corps') was a formation of female communications and clerical personnel created by the Waffen-SS in 1942. Roughly 10,000 women served, and some were formally inducted into the Waffen-SS.

From 1943, they served at Schutzstaffel (SS) and Sicherheitspolizei (SiPo) offices throughout the Reich and occupied Europe, replacing men needed at the front. Women could also serve as civilian employees, known as the SS-Gefolge, without being formal members of the SS.

After Germany's defeat, many auxiliaries were interned by the United States Army and subjected to denazification proceedings; others were tried or dismissed without charge. Academic interest in the corps has focused on its ideological training, its ambiguous post-war legal status, and the strategies former members employed to present themselves as harmless "helpers".

== Formation ==
The predecessor of the SS Auxiliary Corps was the Weibliches Nachrichtenkorps (WNK, lit. 'Female Communications Corps'), established in 1942 under the direction of Ernst Sachs, the SS Chief of Telecommunications, to address severe personnel shortages in SS communications as the Third Reich rapidly expanded its territory, a problem that also affected the Wehrmacht and police, who faced a chronic lack of male signals staff. Internal guidance framed the corps with an Ordensidee ("order-idea"): a female SS elite tied for life to a "motherhouse" school through ideological training and service rotations. By early 1943 it is attested as the Schule für SS-Helferinnen (School for SS Female Assistants).

The SS followed the Wehrmacht's example and recruited women for non-combat roles, but with the explicit intention of creating a "sister organisation" to the SS. The corps offered a means to tie women permanently to the SS through a combination of technical instruction and "world-view education" (German: Weltanschauliche Erziehung). In 1943, the WNK was renamed the SS-Helferinnenkorps. Additionally, Heinrich Himmler modeled the SS-Helferinnenkorps in part on the Finnish Lotta Svärd organization, aiming to free men for combat by assigning women to non-combat support roles such as administration, communications, and logistics. Primarily within the existing Waffen-SS organisational apparatus, replacing ad-hoc female office workers with trained SS-Helferinnen in key SS offices.

== Membership, recruitment, and facilities ==
=== Membership ===
The total size of the corps is unknown. Schwarz (1997) estimates that roughly 10,000 women served in the SS-Helferinnenkorps, in addition to 15,000 police auxiliaries; their deployment ranged from the offices of the Reich Security Main Office (RSHA) in Berlin to the concentration camps. Surviving records document at least 2,375 female members of the Waffen-SS, but incomplete personnel files mean totals vary. One study lists at least 2,765 women affiliated with the SS-Helferinnenkorps, of whom 2,099 appear in "SS-Frauen" holdings; other sources give an indicative figure of about 3,000. Some studies use bigger numbers by counting related groups, like SS women who worked in office or communication jobs, or the wives of SS members; however, they are not strictly part of the corps itself.

=== Recruitment ===
The SS-Helferinnenkorps instituted selective recruitment and training to cultivate an elite cadre rather than a merely auxiliary labour pool. High rejection rates is documented for both male SS applicants and female candidates, they indicate broad prestige-driven interest, yet admission remained restricted, with the corps explicitly styled to mirror the exclusivity of the male SS. Selection drew primarily on SS households (daughters and wives) via internal networks, not public advertising; criteria were competitive and racial-ideological, and many women failed the initial examinations.

Formal status was clarified late in the war: in August 1944 regulations distinguished Kriegshelferinnen (war auxiliaries) from trained SS-Helferinnen who were only admitted to the corps after schooling and examinations at Oberehnheim.

Some of the standards included:

- Applicants ranging from 17–30;
- Had to meet minimum height requirements (initially 1.65 meters, later reduced to 1.58 meters);
- Demonstrate proficiency in written and spoken German;
- Possess a clean criminal record;
- Secure recommendations from an SS member, a Bund Deutscher Mädel leader, or a leader in the National Socialist Women's League

Beyond these formal criteria, candidates underwent racial screening and were expected to display ideological reliability. Motivations for joining varied, including professional ambition, family influence, and personal or political convictions. The corps primarily recruited young, single women, but a minority were married, widowed, or divorced, and a notable number married or became engaged to SS or Wehrmacht men after joining.

==== Foreign recruitment ====
The so-called "Volksdeutsche" populations were recruited; in Hungary the Volksbund organised recruitment for signals (híradó) and medical (egészségügyi) functions, with public appeals at mass assemblies. Late-war high-level requests to expand recruitment are noted in overviews of foreign volunteers and auxiliaries. A nationality-law compendium records a Waffen-SS framework for Volksdeutsche women volunteering for the SS-Helferinnenkorps (age 17–30). In the occupied Netherlands, a Rijksgevolgmachtigde (realm plenipotentiary) was designated for the corps, reporting directly up the chain, evidence of a formal liaison channel in at least one occupied territory.

=== Facilities and housing ===
At Oberehnheim (Obernai), the SS created a self-contained training complex by expropriating a group of châteaux, villas and houses over roughly 90 hectares; staff housing and instructional facilities were erected, with construction drawing on forced labour from the local subcamp of KZ Natzweiler-Struthof. Graduates who passed the examinations received the SS runic badge and the rank designation SS-Helferin ("SS helper"). To accommodate mothers in training, Himmler planned childcare facilities near the Reichsschule-SS, but the scheme was implemented only in isolated cases due to limited infrastructure; he also ordered that any children's home be located 50–60 km from the school to avoid disrupting instruction.

== Distinction from other women's SS organizations ==
The SS-Helferinnenkorps should not be confused with SS-Aufseherinnen (female guards), who received separate guard training for prisoner supervision in concentration camps. While some Helferinnen served in camp administrations and SS security offices, Aufseherinnen formed a distinct category with different training and duties.

Women also served as civilian employees collectively termed the SS-Gefolge (lit. 'female SS retinue'). These auxiliaries were not formal SS members and did not belong to the SS "clan" or family. The Gefolge included not only concentration-camp guards (SS-Aufseherinnen) but also doctors, nurses, telephone and teleprinter operators, and radio personnel within the Waffen-SS.

Further categories comprised SS War Auxiliaries (SS-Kriegshelferinnen), women employed by the SS in wartime roles without necessarily belonging to the Helferinnenkorps, and the broader lit. 'Female Entourage of the SS and Police' (weibliches Gefolge der SS und Polizei), the female retinue attached to SS and police institutions.

== Training, duties and deployment ==
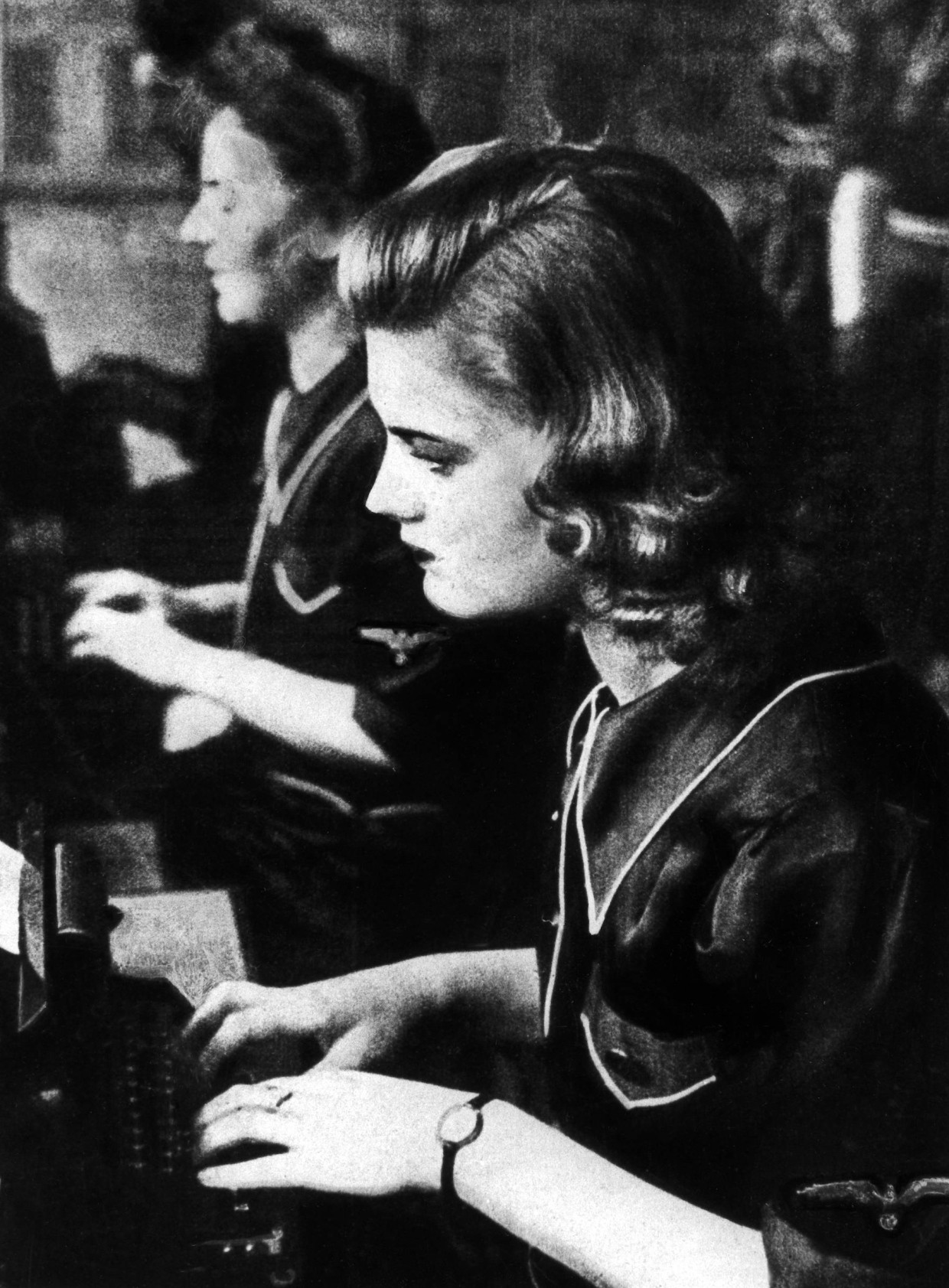
SS-Nachrichtenhelferinnen at Himmler's headquarters, 1944

Applicants aged 17–30 underwent racial screening and then completed an eight-week course at the Oberehnheim/Obernai school in telephone, teleprinter and radio operation, cryptography and message handling, and systematic ideological instruction and SS ritual practices.

After passing their examinations, SS-Helferinnen were posted to SS offices across the Reich and occupied Europe, including the SS Main Economic and Administrative Office (SS-WVHA) at Oranienburg, the Reich Security Main Office (RSHA), staffs of the Kommandeure der Sicherheitspolizei und des SD, and the administrations of concentration camps such as Auschwitz, Buchenwald, Dachau, Flossenbürg, Mauthausen, Mittelbau, Natzweiler, Neuengamme, Sachsenhausen and Stutthof.

Proximity to SS institutions is also reflected in decorations: a nominations list from Auschwitz dated 13 December 1943, signed by Commandant Arthur Liebehenschel, proposed SS-Helferinnen for the War Merit Cross (II Class with Swords).

Leadership development culminated in late-war Führerinnenlehrgänge (leaders' courses). Ilse Staiger is documented as Reichsbeauftragte für die SS-Helferinnen within the SS Main Office.

In practice, most SS-Helferinnen served as communications auxiliaries (SS-Nachrichtenhelferinnen) operating telephone and teletype networks; a smaller number worked as radio operators (Funkerinnen), office clerks or bookkeepers assigned to SS headquarters and field administrations.

By late 1943 postings included the SS Main Office and SS Main Economic and Administrative Office in Berlin, regional Sicherheitspolizei (SiPo) and SD headquarters (e.g., Kraków, Prague), and selected field signal elements attached to Waffen-SS formations.

Although SS-Helferinnen could be stationed at concentration-camp administrations, the camp-guard function (Aufseherinnen) formed a separate category with distinct training and duties.

== Ranks and positions ==
The following ranks and titles are associated with women in the SS-Helferinnenkorps.

Rank (German)	English gloss	Corps tier / status	Description
Reichsbeauftragte	Reich Commissioner	Appointed position (highest office)	Powerful administrative and supervisory role, responsible for the recruitment, welfare, discipline, and public image of all female SS auxiliaries, with significant autonomy and authority within the SS structure. Appointed figures included Julia Op ten Noort (who later declined the position), and Ilse Staiger.
Führerin	Female leader	Führerinnenschaft (leadership cadre)	Senior officers who headed sections of the corps and the Reichsschule-SS.
Führerin-Anwärterin	Leader-candidate	Führerinnenschaft (in training)	Women still undergoing the Reichsschule-SS leadership course before full promotion.
Unterführerin	Junior leader	Führerinnenschaft	Sub-leaders who supervised small helper teams, ranking below the full Führerin.
SS-Helferin	SS helper	Regular personnel	Basic rank (≈ 80 % of the corps); performed clerical, signals and staff duties in SS and police offices.
Kriegshilferin*	War helper	Auxiliary personnel (civilian)	Women drafted under wartime emergency regulations; many were released after only brief service.

== Uniforms and insignia ==
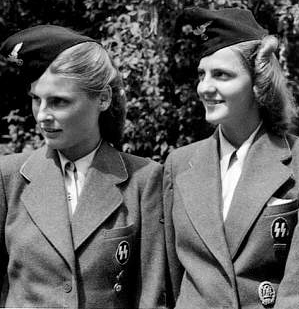
SS-Helferinnen uniform, 1943

SS Women's Auxiliary Corps members were issued a distinctive uniform that reflected its auxiliary status and connection to the broader SS organization. The uniform was designed to be practical for administrative and communications duties, while also signifying the wearer's affiliation with the SS.

=== Standard uniform ===
The standard uniform of the SS-Helferinnenkorps consisted of a field-grey, single-breasted wool jacket with three-button fastening, featuring two rectangular skirt pockets without buttons and a single open left breast pocket. The upper collar was piped with silver-grey, setting it apart from other women's auxiliary uniforms. An oval black cloth patch with a silver cord edging, bearing the SS runes woven in silver-grey thread or aluminium wire, was worn on the left breast pocket. The SS version of the national emblem (Reichsadler) was displayed on the upper left sleeve, 16 cm below the shoulder seam. The jacket was paired with a plain field-grey skirt and black shoes.

The field cap was made of black wool and had a unique design for female auxiliaries, lacking the turn-up flap found on male sidecaps. The SS pattern national emblem was displayed at the front of the cap, but the death's-head (Totenkopf) insignia worn by male personnel was omitted.

Under the jacket, a plain white blouse with a collar was worn, buttoned at the neck. No necktie, cravat, or brooch was permitted. No insignia was allowed on the blouse itself after a 1943 directive from Himmler.

=== Insignia and special distinctions ===
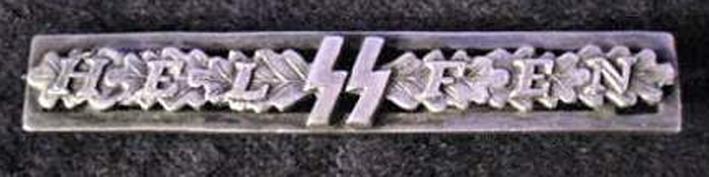
Silver Clasp for SS-Helferinnen

SS-Helferinnen stationed at the Reichsschule-SS, the main training school at Oberrenheim, wore a black machine-woven rayon cuffband with silver-grey edges and the inscription "Reichsschule-SS" on the lower left sleeve, while other auxiliaries wore a cuffband inscribed "SS-Helferin".

In July 1943, a special award known as the Silberspange für SS-Helferinnen (Silver Clasp for SS-Helferinnen) was introduced; this clasp featured a silver rectangular frame with SS runes and sprays of oak leaves, inscribed with "HEL" and "FEN" to form the word "Helfen" (to help).

The SS-Kriegshelferinnen (war helpers) wore a similar uniform but were not permitted to wear the cuffband or the SS runes patch on the breast pocket.

In September 1943, Himmler ordered that the national emblem was not to be worn on the blouse, only on the jacket, coat, and cap. The signallers' badge (Blitz) was also forbidden on the uniform after this date. The uniform of the SS-Helferinnenkorps was closely modeled on those of other German women's auxiliaries but included unique SS insignia and distinctions.

Leadership candidates (Führerschülerinnen) received permission to have a black uniform tailored if they sourced the cloth themselves.

== Leadership ==
The SS-Helferinnenkorps maintained a graded female leadership under central SS oversight. At unit level, an SS-Unterführerin supervised deployed Helferinnen; the women's homes (Heime) were run by a Heimleiterin (with local variants sometimes distinguishing smaller billets), who represented the women to the local Dienststellenleiter. The highest female office was the Reichsbeauftragte im SS-Helferinnenkorps, a headquarters post regulated by service instructions and tied administratively first to the SS communications directorate (Chef des Fernmeldewesens) and later to the SS Main Office (SS-Hauptamt).

In April 1943, Ilse Staiger was assigned to the Reichsschule-SS at Oberehnheim (Obernai, Alsace) as acting Heimleiterin to replace an ill incumbent. In autumn 1943 she was transferred to Berlin and appointed Reichsbeauftragte for the corps, initially on the staff of the Chef des Fernmeldewesens; from mid-1944 the post was placed at the SS-Hauptamt.

The Reichsbeauftragte was responsible for the welfare and supervision of SS-Helferinnen, overseeing billet conditions and compliance with duty and housing regulations, including arrangements for night work, accommodation access, and pregnant personnel. A Dienstanweisung dated 11 July 1944 authorised inspections, access to personnel files, and travel orders, and required reporting via the Chef des Fernmeldewesens to SS leadership. On 14 September 1944 Staiger received a deputy (identified as "Ilse B."), a former full-time BDM leader.

According to her post-war testimony, Staiger was briefly captured near the German–French border in January 1945, exchanged via Switzerland, and returned to Berlin in late March 1945; during her absence her deputy acted as Reichsbeauftragte. A planned successor, Julia op ten Noort, was selected in December 1944 but never installed; the office (Dienststelle der Reichsbeauftragten) was newly created in autumn 1943 and based in Berlin.

Late-war professionalisation included Führerinnenlehrgänge (leadership courses), a first course in early 1945 is attested. Effective 1 January 1945, the incorporation of qualifying female police auxiliaries into the SS-Helferinnenkorps under the personnel authority of the SS-Hauptamt.

== Post-war ==
On 13 April 1945, the U.S. military government ordered the arrest of SS-Helferinnen as a preventive measure against potential resistance. Internment camps such as Lager 77 Ludwigsburg housed several hundred women, whose average detention time was around two years.

Denazification courts such as the Spruchkammer proceedings evaluated the auxiliaries under two overlapping frameworks: Law for Liberation from National Socialism and Militarism (1946), and Youth Amnesty Ordinance (persons born after 1 January 1919).

Typical defence strategies included denying any knowledge of SS crimes, claiming compulsory recruitment, or equating their work with that of Wehrmacht telephone operators. Outcomes ranged from classification as Minderbelastete (lesser offenders) with fines or labour service to complete discharge under the youth amnesty.

Former leaders such as Ruth Brinkmann cooperated with the Waffen-SS veterans' organisation (HIAG), seeking recognition and pension rights. By the late 1970s at least 25 former auxiliaries had formed an informal network that lobbied, ultimately successfully, for their wartime service to count as "military-like employment" under West German pension law.

== Historical assessment ==
=== Scholarship views ===
Early historiography often portrayed the SS-Helferinnen as naïve bystanders akin to Wehrmacht auxiliaries, but recent scholarship highlight their voluntary participation, ideological training, and integration into the SS command structure, viewing them as "bureaucratic accomplices", rather than innocent support staff.

Mühlenberg (2020) examined the existing literature noting:

- Franz Seidler's Frauen zu den Waffen? (1978) was the first academic study of the corps, controversially claiming the Nuremberg Trials declared them "not criminal," an interpretation that influenced later views despite weak sourcing.
- Betty Kennedy's 1982 thesis, based on 655 personnel files, offered only a cursory context due to limited archival research, and provocatively concluded that their "guilt was largely their innocence and idealism."
- Gerhard Rempel's Hitler's Children (1989) argued the corps' creation was belated but effective in mobilizing resources, highlighting new links between the BDM and Waffen-SS.
- Gudrun Schwarz's Frauen im Apparat der SS (1992) broadened the perspective by documenting the significant, often overlooked roles of women as perpetrators within the SS system, including in camps and administrative offices.

=== Incidents ===
According to Century (2012), SS-Helferinnen were required to uphold the corps' reputation, with misconduct grounds for immediate dismissal.

Isolated cases of gonorrhoea occurred; three trainees were dismissed from the Reichsschule-SS for the disease, and first-aid courses addressed STIs, though the depth of instruction is unclear.

Disciplinary files record a request for the Helferin's dismissal after a nocturnal visit by an SS officer "in pyjamas," repeated breaks, and "mendacious excuses." A December 1943 complaint at Oberehnheim alleged lesbian activities, another dismissal for suspected same-sex conduct, and a case of drunkenness in men's quarters that led to interrogation and sanctions for involved SS men.

Overall, 155 dismissals are noted, including six for theft. Punishments were initially handled by SS Court Main Office personnel, who had a SS court leader (Gerichts-SS-Führer) at the school; after Himmler ended this arrangement, dismissal decisions lay with the SS Chief of Telecommunications, with the school obliged to comply.

Releases for pregnancy, health, or pressing family needs were also granted, while many volunteers cited uniform, travel, adventure, or patriotic service yet remained subject to strict conduct and training regimes.

== See also ==
- Women in Nazi Germany
