= SS-Leitheft =

Nazi magazine

SS-Leitheft ("SS-lead-booklet") was a Nazi periodical from 1934 to 1945.

This "SS-leadership magazine", as it is often called, was published in German in Berlin from 1934 onward, and in the beginning mostly circulated among professional officers in the SS. The publisher was the SS-Hauptamt, the main office of the Reichsführer-SS Heinrich Himmler, and the printing was done by M. Müller and Sohn in Berlin.

When war came, with need for new recruits, the SS-Leitheft was also published at the Germanische Leitstelle in Oslo, Norway in Norwegian; Copenhagen, Denmark in Danish; Brussels, Belgium in Flemish; and Den Haag, the Netherlands in Dutch. There was also an Estonian edition. The normative texts were usually translated from German, but with more room for national diversity as war went on.

Very little is known of the staff work in general, but the writer Eystein Eggen has given a detailed description regarding the Leitheft's Norse version, his father being the Norwegian editor-in-chief.

== See also ==
- Das Schwarze Korps
