= Julia op ten Noort =

Dutch National Socialist political activist (1910–1996)

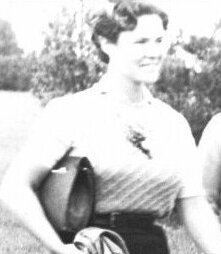
- op ten Noort in the 1930s
- Born: Julia Adriana op ten Noort; 9 November 1910; Amsterdam, Netherlands
- Died: 30 August 1996 (aged 85) near Fulda, Germany
- Other names: Jkvr. Julia op ten Noort; Juul
- Occupation: Political activist
- Known for: Founding role in the National Socialist Women's Organisation (NSVO); director of the Reichsschule für Mädel at Heythuysen
- Political party: National Socialist Movement in the Netherlands (NSB)
- Spouse: Michael Sebastian Rothfischer (m. 1953; div. 1958)
- Children: 1

Julia Adriana op ten Noort (9 November 1910 – 30 August 1996) was a Dutch National Socialist political activist in the National Socialist Movement in the Netherlands (NSB). She helped organise the National Socialist Women's Organisation (NSVO) before and during the German occupation and, from 1942 to 1943, served as director of the girls' Reichsschule in Heythuysen (Limburg). After the war she was convicted by a special tribunal and later settled in Germany.

== Biography ==
=== Early life ===
Op ten Noort was born in Amsterdam on 9 November 1910 to Godfried Carl op ten Noort and Maria Aletta Johanna Bock, in a Protestant noble family; she completed several years of secondary schooling. In the early 1930s she was active in the Oxford Group (later Moral Re-Armament), travelling in Switzerland, the United Kingdom, Canada and the United States. In April 1934, after a meeting in Stuttgart, she and fellow evangelists lunched in Breslau with SS-Gruppenführer Udo von Woyrsch and a group of senior SS leaders, including Heinrich Himmler; de Vries notes Himmler later claimed to have "converted" her to National Socialism and that the two remained in contact thereafter.

=== NSB activism and the NSVO ===
Op ten Noort joined the NSB in 1937 and, after observing programmes of the German Nationalsozialistische Frauenschaft (NSF), worked to build a women's organisation in the Netherlands. On 10 May 1940 she was briefly detained by Dutch authorities and released by German troops after the capitulation. In 1941 she had a short relationship with Dutch SS volunteer Pieter Schelte Heerema; according to de Vries the pregnancy ended in miscarriage and Heerema refused marriage. Within the movement she aligned with the radical, SS-oriented current associated with Meinoud Rost van Tonningen.

=== Reichsschule Heythuysen (1942–1943) ===
On 1 September 1942 two Reichsschulen opened in the Netherlands, a boys' school at Valkenburg and a girls' school at Heythuysen; Op ten Noort was appointed director of the latter. The Heythuysen school occupied the St. Elisabeth pension at the St. Elisabeth convent, requisitioned in July 1942. Contemporary and later studies describe difficulties at the school, including staff inexperience, hygiene problems and disease outbreaks, as well as friction with the boys' school at Valkenburg. Op ten Noort left the post in 1943.

=== Lebensborn birth and late war ===
In September 1943 Himmler outlined a plan for Op ten Noort to enter a Lebensborn clinic under a German alias; SS-Obersturmbannführer Paul Baumert was to arrange her passport and cover posting, after which she would be admitted to a home shortly before the birth and later "adopt" her own child. Registered as "Marijke von Weiler-Bock," she arrived at Heim Hochland (Steinhöring) on 8 November 1943 and later gave birth to a son whom she named Heinrich; after several months she placed him with a foster family before returning to the Netherlands. De Vries further records that she attended Reich Party Days in Nuremberg several times at Himmler's invitation and expense. In the summer–autumn of 1944 she moved to Berlin to work for the Germanische Leitstelle; she obtained German citizenship in November 1944 and was appointed Reichsbeauftragte in the SS-Helferinnenkorps, an appointment she declined in January 1945 before relocating with her child to the SS convalescent home at Miesbach in Bavaria.

=== Post-war trial and later life ===
After the war Op ten Noort surrendered in Germany, was extradited to the Netherlands and, in 1948, was sentenced by a special tribunal; she was released early in 1949 and returned to Germany. She lived near Fulda, worked as a cook and expressed interest in Eastern religions, including Hinduism and reincarnation. She married the painter Michael Sebastian Rothfischer in 1953; they divorced in 1958. Op ten Noort died near Fulda on 30 August 1996. (Note: Some summaries give 30 August 1994 as the date of death; specialist biographies give 30 August 1996. Compare Matthée (2018) with Netwerk Oorlogsbronnen' person entry.)

== Views and public image ==
Historians describe Op ten Noort as part of the SS-aligned, volkse current within the NSB and note her proximity to Rost van Tonningen. Studies of the Reichskommissariat and occupation policy place the Heythuysen and Valkenburg schools within broader Germanisation and elite-education projects in the Netherlands.

== Legacy ==
The Heythuysen girls' Reichsschule and the boys' school at Valkenburg are discussed in histories of National Socialist elite education and in studies of German occupation in the Netherlands.
