= Ahnenerbe =

Nazi German pseudoscientific organization

- Emblem
- Formation: July 1, 1935
- Founder: Heinrich Himmler
- Dissolved: 1947
- Legal status: Registered association under Schutzstaffel control
- Purpose: Propaganda; Pseudoscientific research
- Official language: German
- President: Walther Wüst

The Ahnenerbe (German: [ˈaːnənˌʔɛʁbə], "Ancestral Heritage") was a pseudoscientific organization founded by the Schutzstaffel in Nazi Germany in 1935. Established by Reichsführer-SS Heinrich Himmler on July 1, 1935 as an SS appendage devoted to promoting racial theories espoused by Adolf Hitler and the Nazi Party, the Ahnenerbe consisted of academics and scientists from a broad range of academic disciplines who fostered the idea that Germans descended from an Aryan race which was racially superior to other racial groups.

Hitler became Chancellor of Germany in 1933, and transformed the country into a one-party state governed as a dictatorship. He claimed that Germans were descended from an Aryan race which, in contrast to established academic understandings, had invented most major developments in human history, such as agriculture, art and writing. Most of the world's scholars did not accept this, and the Nazis established the Ahnenerbe in order to provide evidence for their racial theories and to promote them to the German public. Ahnenerbe scholars interpreted evidence to fit Hitler's beliefs, and many consciously fabricated evidence to do so. The organisation sent expeditions to various parts of the world to find evidence to support their theories.

The government of Nazi Germany used the organization's research to justify many of their policies, including the Holocaust. Nazi propaganda also cited Ahnenerbe claims that archaeological evidence indicated that the Aryan race had historically resided in eastern Europe to justify German expansion there. In 1937, the Ahnenerbe became an official branch of the SS and was renamed the Research and Teaching Community in Ancestral Heritage (Institute der Forschungsgemeinschaft Deutsches Ahnenerbe). Much of their research was placed on hold after the outbreak of World War II in 1939, though they continued to carry out new research in areas under German occupation after Operation Barbarossa began in 1941.

During the end of World War II in Europe in 1945, Ahnenerbe members destroyed much of the organization's paperwork to avoid being incriminated in forthcoming war crimes trials. Numerous members escaped Allied denazification policies and remained active in West Germany's archaeological establishment in the postwar era, which stifled scholarly research into the Ahnenerbe until German reunification in 1990. Ideas promoted by the organization have retained an appeal for some neo-Nazi and far-right circles and have also influenced later pseudoarchaeologists.

== Background ==
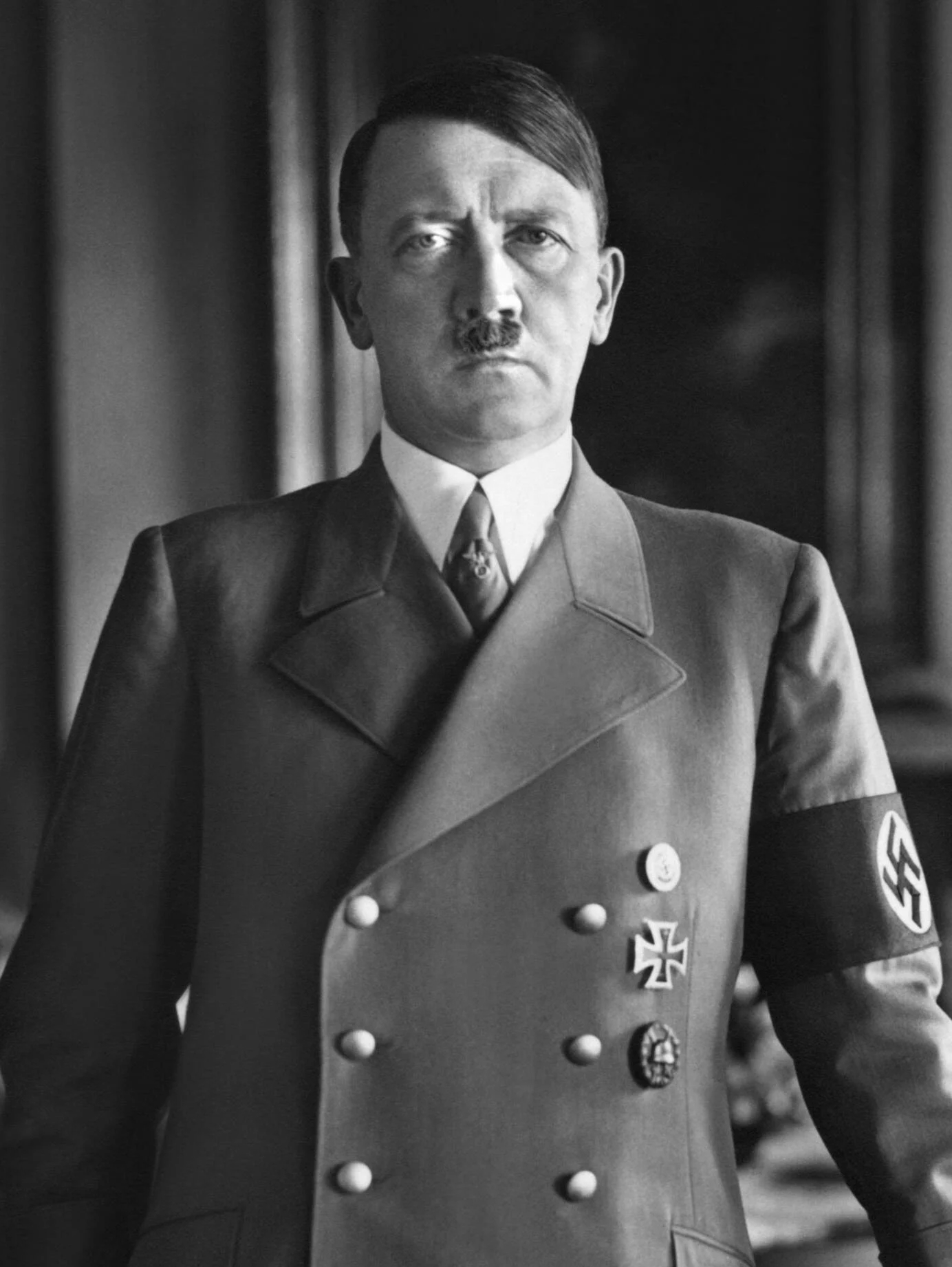
Adolf Hitler, whose racial beliefs inspired research carried out by the Ahnenerbe

Adolf Hitler believed that one could divide humanity into three groups: "the founders of culture, the bearers of culture, the destroyers of culture". The founders of culture, in Hitler's view, were a biologically distinct Aryan race who (he believed) had been tall, blond, and originating in Northern Europe. He believed that in prehistory, the Aryan race had been responsible for all significant developments in human culture, including agriculture, architecture, music, literature, and the visual arts. He believed that most modern Germans were the descendants of these Aryans and had genetically inherited the Aryans' biological superiority to other races. The destroyers of culture, in Hitler's view, were the Jews, whom he regarded not as a genetically diverse population sharing certain ethno-cultural and religious traits—as they were then widely recognized—but as a unified, biologically distinct race. He believed that wherever Jews went, they damaged and ultimately destroyed the cultures surrounding them.

Hitler had promoted his ideas about the greatness of Germany's ancestors in his 1925 book, Mein Kampf. Outside Germany, most scholars and scientists regarded Hitler's ideas about human evolution and prehistory as nonsense, in part due to the absence of any evidence that North European communities had ever originated major developments in prehistory, such as the development of agriculture and writing, all of which first appeared in the Near East and in Asia.

In January 1929 Hitler appointed Nazi Party member Heinrich Himmler to head the Schutzstaffel (SS), a paramilitary group founded in 1925 to serve as personal bodyguards to Hitler and other Nazis. Himmler set out to re-organise the SS, introducing a better system of organisation, and gathering intelligence on prominent Jews and Freemasons, as well as on rival political groups. In 1929, Himmler launched an SS recruitment campaign, and by the end of 1931 the group had 10,000 members. Himmler aimed to ensure that this membership was as racially Nordic as possible, establishing the SS Race and Settlement Main Office (RuSHA) to screen both applicants and the women whom SS members proposed to marry. In believing in the existence of a "Nordic" racial type which was the purest survival of the ancient Aryans, Himmler was influenced by the Nordicist ideas of Hans F. K. Günther (1891–1968), which had been popular in German nationalist circles over the preceding decades.

Himmler had an abiding interest in the past, and in how it could provide a blueprint for the future. However, his views of the ancient Germanic peoples differed from Hitler's in certain areas. Hitler was perplexed as to why ancient societies in southern Europe had developed more advanced technology and architecture than their contemporaries in northern Europe. Hitler stated that "People make a tremendous fuss about the excavations carried out in districts inhabited by our forebears of the pre-Christian era. I am afraid that I cannot share their enthusiasm, for I cannot help remembering that, while our ancestors were making these vessels out of stone and clay, over which our archaeologists rave, the Greeks had already built the Acropolis." Hitler explained this by claiming that the Aryans must also have inhabited the south of the continent and that they were responsible for establishing the societies of ancient Greece and Rome. Specifically, he believed that it was the warmer climates of the south that enabled these Aryans to develop in ways that those living further north, in colder and wetter climates, did not. Himmler was aware of these views but, unlike Hitler, admired what he believed was the fierceness and valour of the Germanic tribes of northern Europe. He was particularly interested in Tacitus's Germania, an ethnographic and historical account of the Iron-Age Germanic tribes written by the Roman historian at the end of the first century CE.

=== Nazi Party takes power ===
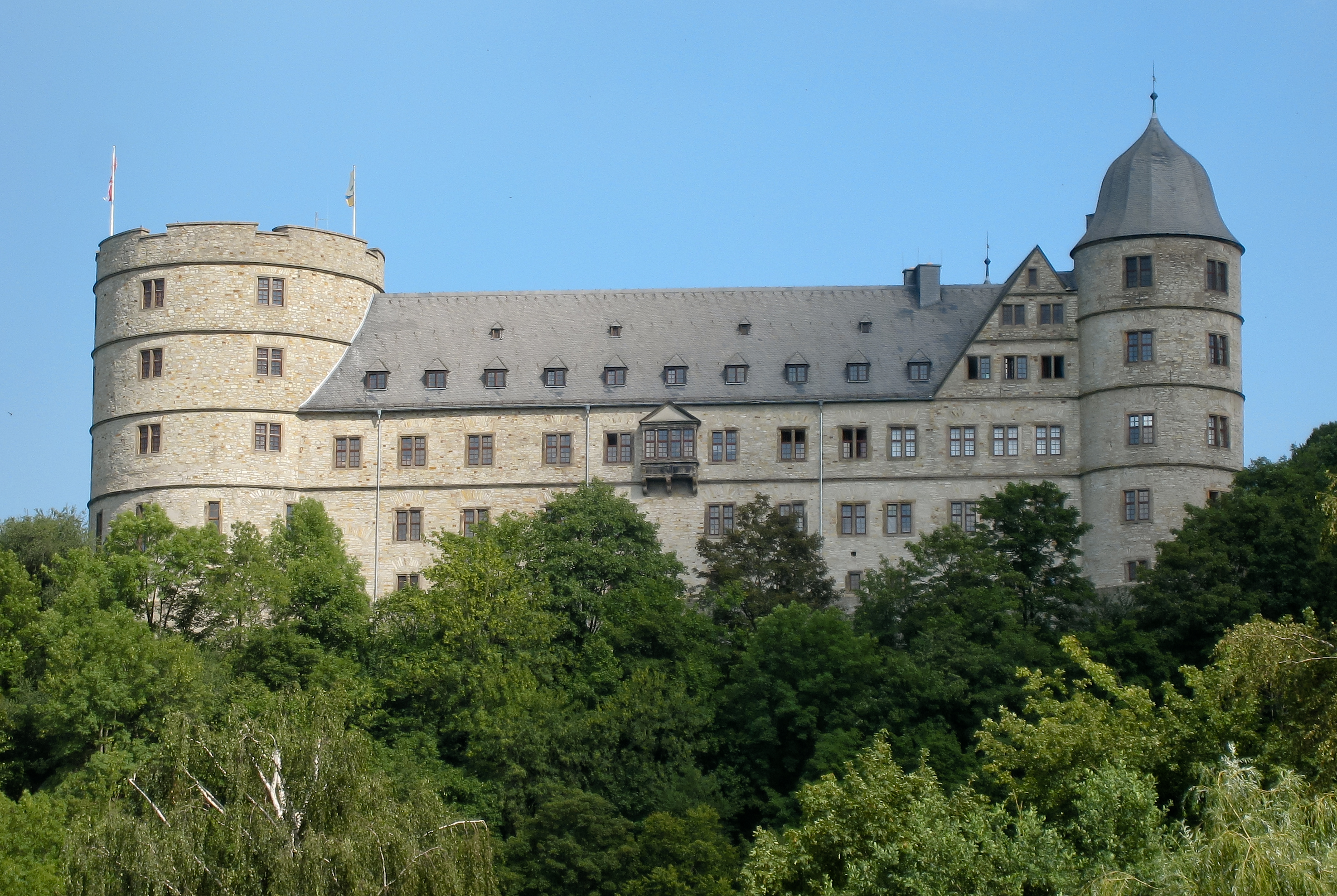
Wewelsburg, which Himmler adopted as an SS base on the advice of the occultist Karl Maria Wiligut

In 1933, following the Nazi seizure of power, Heinrich Himmler initiated plans to establish a "Nordic Academy" to assist the instruction of the SS upper ranks. He was assisted in this by Karl Maria Wiligut, an occultist who was popular in German ultra-nationalist circles. Himmler brought Wiligut into the SS—where he eventually rose to the rank of Brigadeführer—and gave him a private villa in Berlin. Using Wiligut's prophecies as his guide, Himmler selected Wewelsburg castle in Westphalia to serve as a base for many SS operations. The architect Hermann Bartels was employed to oversee renovations to the castle to make it fit for the SS's use. As part of these alterations, one of the rooms in the building became known as "the Grail Room" with a rock crystal representing the Holy Grail being placed in a central position. Himmler also established a private museum at the castle, employing the young archaeologist Wilhelm Jordan to manage it.

In 1934, Himmler met the Dutch prehistorian Herman Wirth, who was then living in Germany, at the home of Johann von Leers, a Nazi propagandist. Wirth was one of the most controversial prehistorians in Germany. After examining symbols found in rural Frisian folk art, he became convinced that they represented the survival of an ancient script used by a prehistoric Nordic civilisation. This script, Wirth believed, was the world's oldest written language and had been the basis for all other ancient scripts. Wirth also believed that if he could decipher it, he could then learn the nature of the ancient religion of the Aryan race. This belief conflicted with established scholarly understandings of the past; by the 1930s, scholars were aware that the world's two oldest scripts were those of Mesopotamia and Egypt, and that northern Europe only developed its own form of literacy, that of the runes, under the influence of Etruscan alphabet between 400 BCE to 50 CE. Attempting to explain the lack of any archaeological or historical evidence for an ancient advanced Nordic civilisation, Wirth claimed that the Aryans had evolved in an Arctic homeland two million years ago, before establishing their advanced society on a land in the North Atlantic, which had since sunken into the sea, giving rise to the stories about Atlantis.

Wirth's ideas were rejected and ridiculed by the German archaeological establishment, although they had gained the support of several wealthy backers, which assisted him in promoting them. Himmler was among those who liked Wirth's ideas. Himmler was interested in the pre-Christian religions of northern Europe, believing that a modern Pagan religion modelled on them could replace Christianity as the primary religion of the German people. Himmler disliked Christianity because of its Semitic origins, its presentation of Jesus as a Jew, and its advocacy of charity and compassion. Later, Himmler privately told his personal physician that after the Second World War, "the old Germanic gods will be restored".

== History ==
=== Formation ===
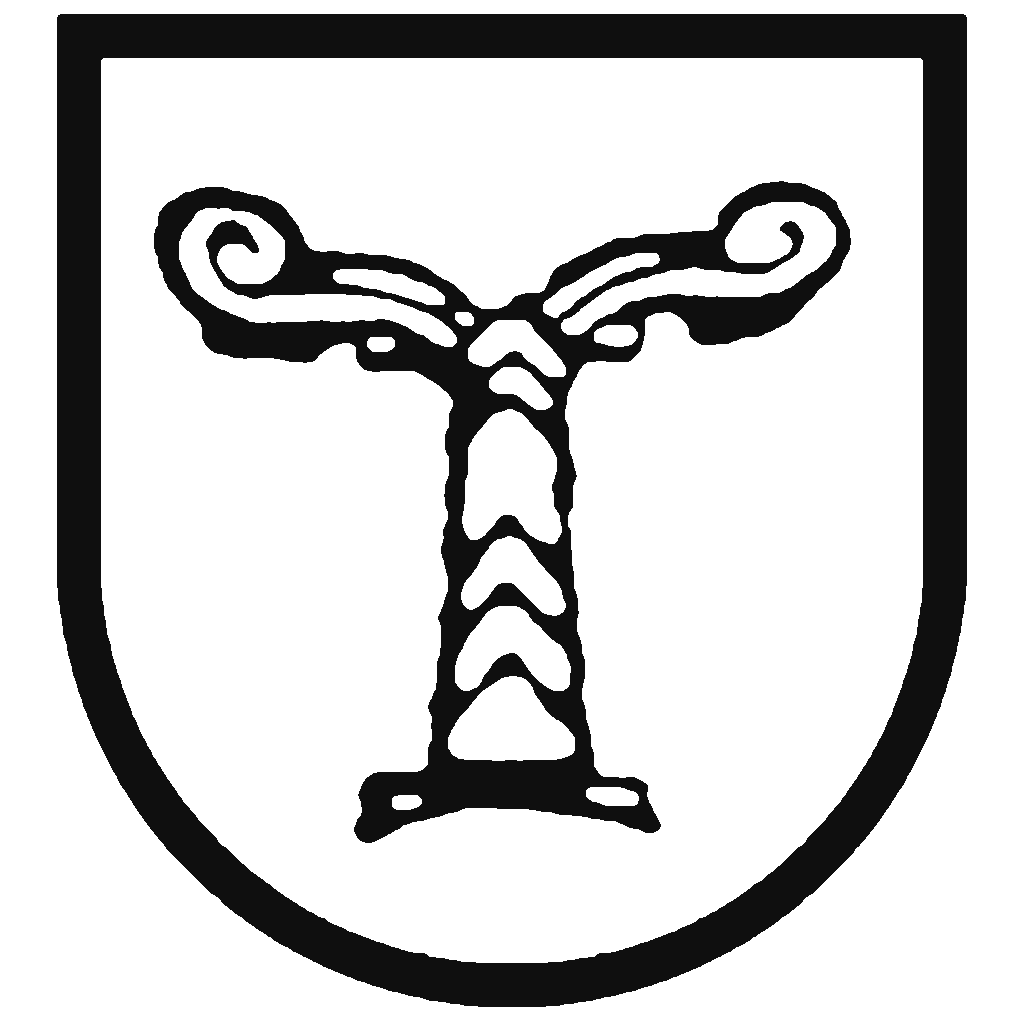
Ahnenerbe Irminsul symbol

On July 1, 1935, Himmler organised a meeting at the Berlin headquarters of the SS where he discussed his desire to launch a prehistoric research institute. Both Wirth and the agriculturalist Richard Walther Darré were present, and both responded with enthusiasm to the idea. The group was launched as a department of RuSHA. Wirth became the group's president, while Himmler took the role of superintendent, a position entailing considerable control by placing him in charge of its board of trustees. Its formal goal was "to promote the science of ancient intellectual history".

The organisation was initially named the "Deutsches Ahnenerbe Studiengesellschaft für Geistesurgeschichte" (Society for the Study of the History of Primeval Ideas), but this was soon shortened to Ahnenerbe. This was a German term for "something inherited from the forefathers". The Ahnenerbe's first premises were at number 29 and 30 of the Brüderstrasse, a thirteenth-century street in Berlin. These corner buildings were rented from the city's department store magnate Rudolf Herdzog. Initially, it employed seven members of staff. Reflecting Wirth's fixation on the idea of an ancient Aryan script, the organisation's early focus was upon what Wirth called "script and symbol studies". One of its researchers, Yrjö von Grönhagen, was for instance tasked with collecting the Finnish wooden calendars which were engraved with various symbols.

Starting in 1934, Himmler began financially supporting and visiting excavations in Germany. This brought him into contact with archaeologists like Alexander Langsdorff, Hans Schleif, Werner Buttler and Wilhelm Unverzagt, director of the Staatliches Museum für Vor- und Frühgeschichte in Berlin. Initially, there were two departments within the SS engaged in archaeology: the Abteilung Ausgrabungen of the Persönlicher Stab des Reichsführers der SS and the Abteilung für Vor- und Frühgeschichte at the RuSHA. The latter ("RA IIIB") was established in 1934 and was supposed to serve as a "general staff" for all SS activities related to prehistory. It was responsible for archaeological research and related propaganda and led by Rolf Höhne, a geologist. Höhne was eventually replaced by Peter Paulsen, an archaeologist, in October 1937. The department did not conduct any excavations itself, but was intended to extend the influence of the SS over other institutions, especially those responsible for education/research and monument preservation. In fact, Langsdorff did this in Himmler's personal staff. The department also tried to make use of pre-history in the training and indoctrination of SS members. When the RuSHA was restructured, the department was dissolved with its responsibilities passing to the Ahnenerbe. The Abteilung Ausgrabung in Himmler's personal staff was established in 1935 on the initiative of Langsdorff. In March 1937, Höhne joined the leadership of this department. By 1937, it was responsible for SS excavations and maintained its own personnel for this activity.

The organization's official mission was twofold. Its first purpose was to reveal new evidence for the accomplishments of the ancestors of the modern Germans "using exact scientific methods". Its second purpose was to convey its findings to the German public through magazine articles, books, museum exhibits, and scholarly conferences. According to Pringle, it was however "in the business of myth-making", repeatedly "distorting the truth and churning out carefully tailored evidence to support the racial ideas of Adolf Hitler." Some members of the Ahnenerbe consciously altered their evidence and interpretations to match Hitler's beliefs; others appear to have been unaware of how their adherence to Nazi doctrine was shaping their interpretations.

Himmler regarded the Ahnenerbe as an elite think tank which would sweep away previous scholarship on the development of humanity and reveal that Hitler's ideas on the subject were true. Himmler also believed that the group's investigations might reveal ancient secrets about agriculture, medicine, and warfare which would benefit Nazi Germany. It employed scholars from a wide range of academic fields, including archaeology, anthropology, ethnology, folkloristics, runology, Classics, history, musicology, philology, biology, zoology, botany, astronomy, and medicine. Himmler believed that scholars active in all of these different fields would piece together a view of the past that would revolutionise established interpretations; in his words, it would represent "hundreds of thousands of little mosaic stones, which portray the true picture of the origins of the world."

On July 1, 1935, at SS headquarters in Berlin, Himmler met with five "racial experts" representing Darré and with Wirth. Together they established an organization called the "German Ancestral Heritage—Society for the Study of the History of Primeval Ideas" (Deutsches Ahnenerbe—Studiengesellschaft für Geistesurgeschichte), shortened to its better-known form in 1937. At the meeting they designated its official goal, “to promote the science of ancient intellectual history,” and appointed Himmler as its superintendent, with Wirth serving as its president. Himmler appointed Wolfram Sievers Generalsekretär (General Secretary) of the Ahnenerbe.

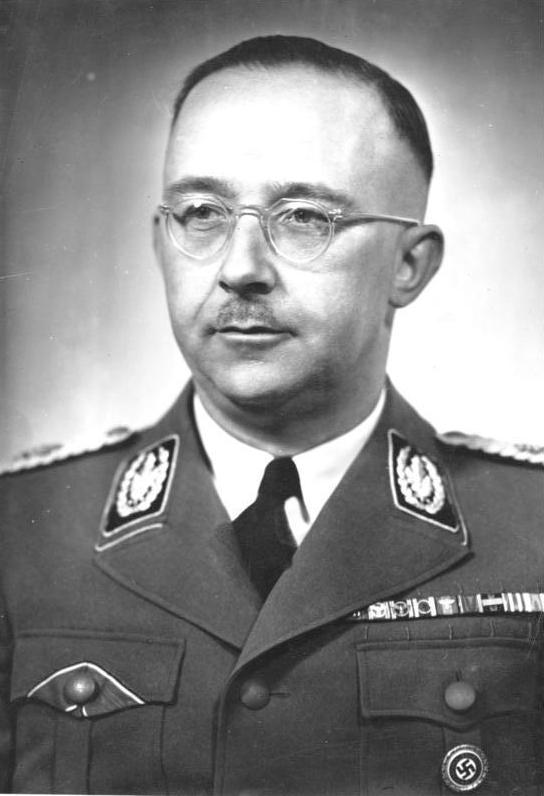
Heinrich Himmler, Reichsführer-SS and founder of the Ahnenerbe

Through 1937, the Ahnenerbe was essentially engaged in amateur völkisch research. Financial and academic pressure caused Himmler to start looking for an alternative to Wirth as early as the spring of 1936. In September, Hitler negatively referred to Wirth's beliefs regarding Atlantis and their influence on "Böttcherstrasse architecture" in a speech at the Reichsparteitag.

In March 1937, the Ahnenerbe was given a new statute, implementing the Führerprinzip (leader principle) and giving Himmler extensive powers. Wirth was deposed as president and appointed honorary president, a powerless position. Himmler's position as Kurator was given more power.

Walther Wüst was appointed the new president of the Ahnenerbe. Wüst was an expert on India and a dean at LMU Munich, working on the side as a Vertrauensmann for the Sicherheitsdienst (SD, Security Service). Referred to as The Orientalist by Wolfram Sievers, Wüst had been recruited by him in May 1936 because of his ability to simplify science for the common man. After being appointed president, Wüst began improving the Ahnenerbe, moving the offices to a new headquarters that cost 300,000 ℛ︁ℳ︁ in the Dahlem neighborhood of Berlin. He also worked to limit the influence of “those he deemed scholarly upstarts,” which included cutting communication with the RuSHA office of Karl Maria Wiligut.

The Generalsekretariat led by Sievers was turned into the institution's Reichsgeschäftsführung. The Ahnenerbe was renamed Forschungs- und Lehrgemeinschaft Das Ahnenerbe e.V.. It was moved from the RuSHA to Himmlers's personal staff.

Wirth and Wilhelm Teudt lost their departments in Ahnenerbe in 1938. In 1939, the statutes were changed again and Wirth was deposed as honorary president. Himmler's and Wüsts' titles were switched with Himmler now the president. Next to Wüst, the academic with most influence in the institution after 1939 was Herbert Jankuhn, who in 1937 still had categorically rejected cooperation with the "unscientific" Ahnenerbe.

Ahnenerbe was a mix between an SS department and an Eingetragener Verein. Membership was open to all natural and legal persons. Its staff were SS members, many also working in other SS positions, and thus subject to SS jurisdiction.

In late 1936, Ahnenerbe took over the publication of Teudt's magazine Germanien, first in cooperation with Teudt, then without him. The monthly now became the official voice of Ahnenerbe and was aimed at a wider audience. From December 1936, the magazine was distributed free of charge to all SS leaders.

Cooperation with other SS departments was initially limited, but improved after 1937. Contacts with the SD-HA and the editorial team of the SS weekly Das schwarze Korps intensified. Ahnenerbe eventually had the scientific responsibility for the SS-Leithefte and in conjunction with the SS-HA, Ahnenerbe established Germanische Leitstelle and Germanischer Wissenschaftseinsatz.

In 1939, the Ahnenerbe held its first independent annual convention, at Kiel. The event's success contributed to the trend that archaeologists were increasingly turning to the Ahnenerbe and away from Alfred Rosenberg's rival Reichsbund für Deutsche Vorgeschichte.

In fiscal year 1938–1939, the budget for the excavations department was 65,000 ℛ︁ℳ︁, about 12% of the Ahnenerbe's total budget. More than a third of that went to the Haithabu activities. Under Jankuhn's direction four more archaeological departments were set up: in April 1938 the Forschungsstätte für naturwissenschaftliche Vorgeschichte (a laboratory for analyzing pollen) was established at Dahlem under the leadership of Rudolf Schütrumpf. The Forschungsstätte für Wurtenforschung at Wilhelmshaven led by Werner Haarnagel, the Forschungsstätte für germanisches Bauwesen led by Martin Rudolph and the Forschungsstätte für Urgeschichte directed by Assien Bohmers followed in 1939.

As a gift for Hitler's fiftieth birthday, among the presents which Himmler procured for him was a set of leather bound books, one of which was on the subject of the Ahnenerbe's research.

The Ahnenerbe sought to cultivate an air of professional integrity. The Ahnenerbe became an integral part of the SS. By 1939, the Ahnenerbe employed 137 scholars and scientists, as well as 82 support workers, including artists, photographers, laboratory technicians, librarians, accountants, and secretaries.

=== The Holocaust ===
Himmler used the Ahnenerbe's research to fuel and justify the Holocaust. In a 1937 speech at Bad Tölz, Himmler announced that the bog bodies of northwestern Europe, which testified to an Iron Age tradition in which individuals were deliberately killed and deposited in bogs, must have represented the eradication of homosexuals. This was an idea that he had adopted from Ahnenerbe archaeologist Herbert Jankuhn. His adoption of this suggestion was linked to his homophobic fear that male homosexuality was transmittable and that it could spread within the ranks of the SS and other spaces of male bonding unless strong measures were implemented to prevent it. Himmler then claimed this alleged ancient tradition as legitimation for the extermination of homosexuals within his own society. As many as 15,000 gay men were rounded up and imprisoned in concentration camps, where up to 60 percent died.

=== Second World War ===
Amid the German invasion of Poland in 1939, the Ahnenerbe sent a team into Warsaw to remove any items from its museums which they believed to be German in origin. In 1939, the Ahnenerbe's further four planned expeditions—to Iran, the Canary Islands, the Andes, and Iceland—were indefinitely postponed. At the end of the war in Europe, members of the Ahnenerbe destroyed much of the organisation's paperwork lest it incriminate them during future war crime tribunals.

=== Institutes ===
The Ahnenerbe had several different institutes or sections for its departments of research. Most of these were archeological but others included the Pflegestätte für Wetterkunde (Meteorology Section) headed by Obersturmführer Dr Hans Robert Scultetus, founded on the basis that Hanns Hörbiger's Welteislehre could be used to provide accurate long-range weather forecasts, and a section devoted to musicology, whose aim was to determine "the essence" of German music. It recorded folk music on expeditions to Finland and the Faroe Islands, from ethnic Germans of the occupied territories, and in South Tyrol. The section made sound recordings, transcribed manuscripts and songbooks, and photographed and filmed instrument use and folk dances. The lur, a Bronze Age musical instrument, became central to this research, which concluded that Germanic consonance was in direct conflict to Jewish atonalism.

== Expeditions ==
=== Iceland ===
The country of Iceland was of particular interest to Hitler and Himmler due to their belief that the country was the Thule area which served as the birthplace of the Aryan race. In 1938, Himmler would send an archeological team to Iceland in hopes of finding an ancient place of worship for Nordic gods like Thor and Odin. A total of three Nazi-led trips would occur to Iceland in 1938. However, the three Ahnenerbe expeditions were limited due to restrictions enacted by the Iceland government. Despite finding a cave which the Ahnenerbe-led expedition team claimed was the location of the mystic place of worship, known as the hof, it would be proven that the site was in fact uninhabited before the 18th century.

=== Karelia ===
In 1935, Himmler contacted a Finnish nobleman and author, Yrjö von Grönhagen, after seeing one of his articles about the Kalevala folklore in a Frankfurt newspaper. Grönhagen agreed to lead an expedition through the Karelia region of Finland to record pagan sorcerers and witches. Because there was uncertainty about whether the Karelians would allow photography, the Finnish illustrator Ola Forsell also accompanied the team. Musicologist Fritz Bose brought along a magnetophon, hoping to record pagan chants.

The team departed on their expedition in June 1936. Their first success was with a traditional singer, Timo Lipitsä, who knew a song closely resembling one in the Kalevala although he was unaware of the book. Later, in Tolvajärvi, the team photographed and recorded Hannes Vornanen playing a traditional Finnish kantele.

One of the team's final successes was in finding Miron-Aku, a soothsayer believed to be a witch by locals. Upon meeting the group, she claimed to have foreseen their arrival. The team persuaded her to perform a ritual for the camera and tape recorder in which she summoned the spirits of ancestors and "divine[d] future events." The team also recorded information on Finnish saunas.

=== Bohuslän ===
Scan from Ahnenerbe co-founder Herman Wirth's 1931 book Was heißt deutsch?

After a slide show on February 19, 1936 of his trip to Bohuslän, a region in southwestern Sweden, Wirth convinced Himmler to launch an expedition to the region, the first official expedition financed by the Ahnenerbe. Bohuslän was known for its massive quantity of petroglyph rock carvings, which Wirth believed were evidence of an ancient writing system predating all known systems. Himmler appointed Wolfram Sievers to be the managing director of the expedition, likely because of Wirth's earlier troubles balancing finances.

On August 4, 1936, the expedition set off on a three-month trip, starting at the German island of Rügen, then continuing to Backa visiting the rock carvings in Backa, the first recorded rock-art site in Sweden. Despite the existence of scenes showing warriors, animals and ships, Wirth focused on the lines and circles that he thought made up a prehistoric alphabet. While his studies were largely based on personal belief, rather than objective scientific research, Wirth made interpretations of the meanings of ideograms carved in the rock, such as a circle bisected by a vertical line representing a year and a man standing with raised arms representing what Wirth called "the Son of God." His team proceeded to make casts of what Wirth deemed the most important carvings and then carried the casts to camp, where they were crated and sent back to Germany. Once satisfied with their work at the site, the team set out on a trek through Sweden, eventually reaching the Norwegian island of Lauvøylandet.

=== Italy ===
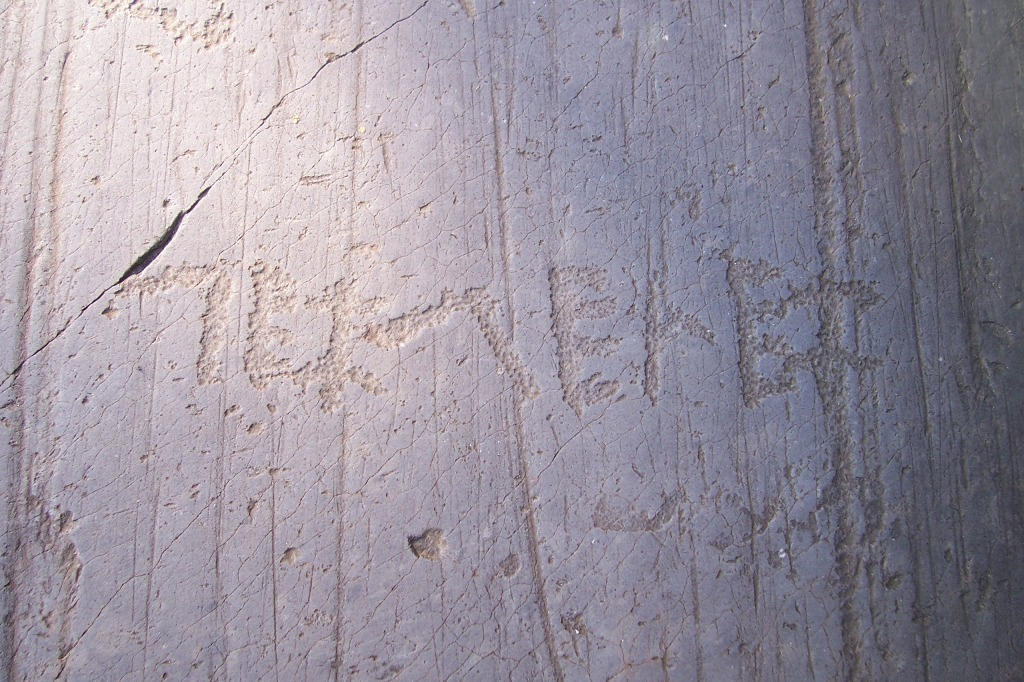
Camunic runes in Val Camonica

In 1937, the Ahnenerbe sent the archaeologist Franz Altheim and his wife, the photographer Erika Trautmann, to Val Camonica, to study prehistoric rock inscriptions. The two returned to Germany claiming that they had found traces of Nordic runes on the rocks, supposedly confirming that ancient Rome was founded by Nordic incomers. Also, an expedition to Sardinia was planned in the 1930s, but the reasons for it still remain unknown. An expedition would have focused on the village of Santa Sofia d'Epiro and the vaults of some Arbëreshë families like Baffa Trasci, Miracco and Masci.

=== Central Eurasia ===
In 1938, Franz Altheim and his research partner Erika Trautmann requested the Ahnenerbe sponsor their expedition from Central Europe through Western Asia to study an internal power struggle of the Roman Empire, which they believed was fought between the Nordic and Semitic peoples. Eager to credit the vast success of the Roman Empire to people of a Nordic background, the Ahnenerbe agreed to match the 4,000 ℛ︁ℳ︁ put forward by Hermann Göring, an old friend of Trautmann's.

In August 1938, after spending a few days traveling through remote hills searching for ruins of Dacian kingdoms, the two researchers arrived at their first major stop in Bucharest, the capital of Romania. There Grigore Florescu, the director of the Municipal Museum, met with them, and discussed both history and the politics of the day, including the activities of the Iron Guard.

After traveling through Istanbul, Athens, and Lebanon, the researchers went to Damascus. They were not welcomed by the French, who ruled Syria as a colony at the time. The newly-sovereign Kingdom of Iraq was being courted for an alliance with Germany, and Fritz Grobba, the German envoy to Baghdad, arranged for Altheim and Trautmann to meet with local researchers and be driven to Parthian and Persian ruins in southern Iraq, as well as Babylon.

Through Baghdad, the team went north to Assur where they met Sheikh Adjil el Yawar, a leader of the Shammar Bedouin tribe and commander of the northern Camel Corps. He discussed German politics and his desire to duplicate the success of Abd al-Aziz ibn Saud who had recently ascended to power in Saudi Arabia. With his support, the team traveled to their final major stop, the ruins of Hatra on the former border between the Roman and Persian empires.

=== Germany ===
==== Hedeby ====
Excavations that had been ongoing at Hedeby since 1930 were formally put under the aegis of Ahnenerbe in 1938 by Jankuhn.

==== Baden-Württemberg ====
In 1937–1938, Gustav Riek led an excavation at the Heuneburg on the Danube in Baden-Württemberg, where an ancient fortress had been discovered much earlier. The Ahnenerbe thus won out over Hans Reinerth of the Reichsbund für Deutsche Vorgeschichte who had competed for the excavation. Riek focused on the burial mound known as Hohmichele where he found the main burial chamber to have been plundered in antiquity. In its direct vicinity another grave was discovered, however, that included rich grave furnishings. Due to the outbreak of war in 1939 the excavations were discontinued.

A private expedition by Richard Anders and Wiligut into the Murg Valley of northwestern Baden-Württemberg had nothing to do with the Ahnenerbe.

==== Mauern ====
The Ahnenerbe also was active in the Mauerner Höhlen (Mauern caves) in the Franconian Jura. R.R. Schmidt discovered red ochre, a common pigment for cave paintings made by the Cro-Magnon.

In autumn 1937, Assien Bohmers, a Frisian nationalist who had applied to the SS Excavations Department earlier that year, took over the excavation. His team proceeded to find artifacts such as burins, ivory pendants, and a woolly mammoth skeleton. They also discovered Neanderthal remains buried with what appeared to be throwing spears and javelins, a technology thought to have been developed by the Cro-Magnons.

Bohmers interpreted this to mean that Cro-Magnons had left these stones in the caves over 70,000 years before, and this was therefore the oldest Cro-Magnon site in the world. To validate his claims, Bohmers traveled around Europe speaking with colleagues and organizing exhibitions, notably in the Netherlands, Belgium and France.

=== France ===
At the Parisian Institute for Human Paleontology, Bohmers met with Abbé Henri Breuil, an expert on cave art. Breuil arranged for Bohmers to visit Trois Frères, a site whose owners allowed only a small number of visitors. First, however, Bohmers took a quick trip to London, followed by a tour of several other French points of interest: Font-de-Gaume (a site featuring Cro-Magnon cave paintings), Teyat, La Mouthe and the caves of Dordogne. Then Bohmers moved on to Les Trois-Frères.

==== Bayeux Tapestry ====
The Ahnenerbe took great interest in the 900-year-old Bayeux Tapestry. In June 1941, its staff oversaw the transport of the tapestry from its home in Bayeux Cathedral to an abbey at Juaye-Mondaye, and finally to the Château de Sourches. In August 1944, after Paris was liberated by the Allies, two members of the SS were dispatched to Paris to retrieve the tapestry, which had been moved into the basement of the Louvre. Contrary to Himmler's orders, however, they chose not to attempt to enter the Louvre, most likely because of the strong presence of the French Resistance in the historic area.

=== Tibet ===
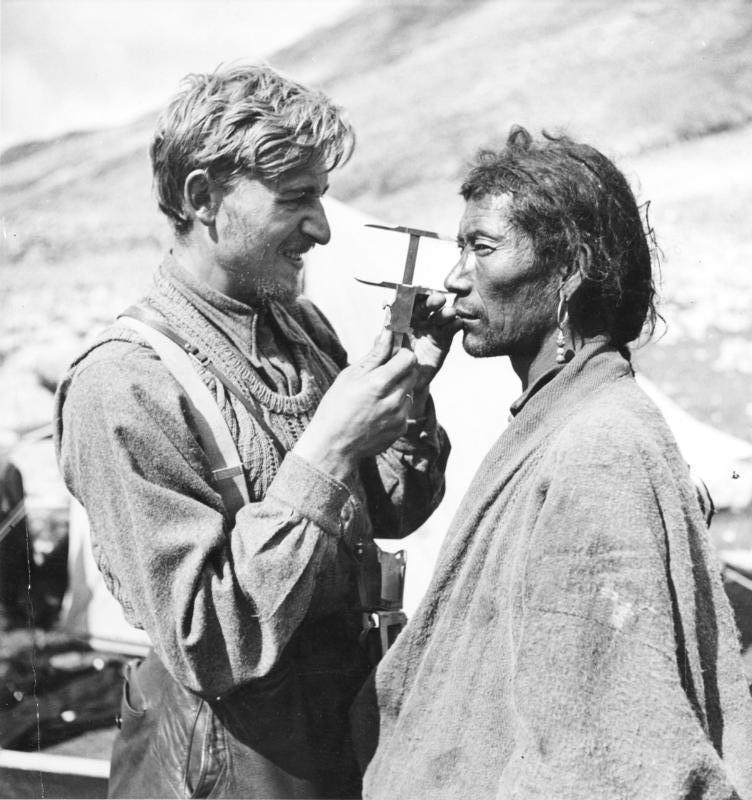
Bruno Beger conducting anthropometric studies in Sikkim

In 1937, Himmler decided that he could increase the Ahnenerbe's visibility by investigating Hans F. K. Günther’s claims that early Aryans had conquered much of Asia, including attacks against China and Japan in approximately 2000 BC, and that Gautama Buddha was himself an Aryan offshoot of the Nordic race. Walther Wüst later expanded on this theory, stating in a public speech that Adolf Hitler's ideology corresponded with that of the Buddha, since the two shared a common heritage. However, according to contemporary research Hitler himself was not interested in Buddhism or Tibet.

=== Poland ===
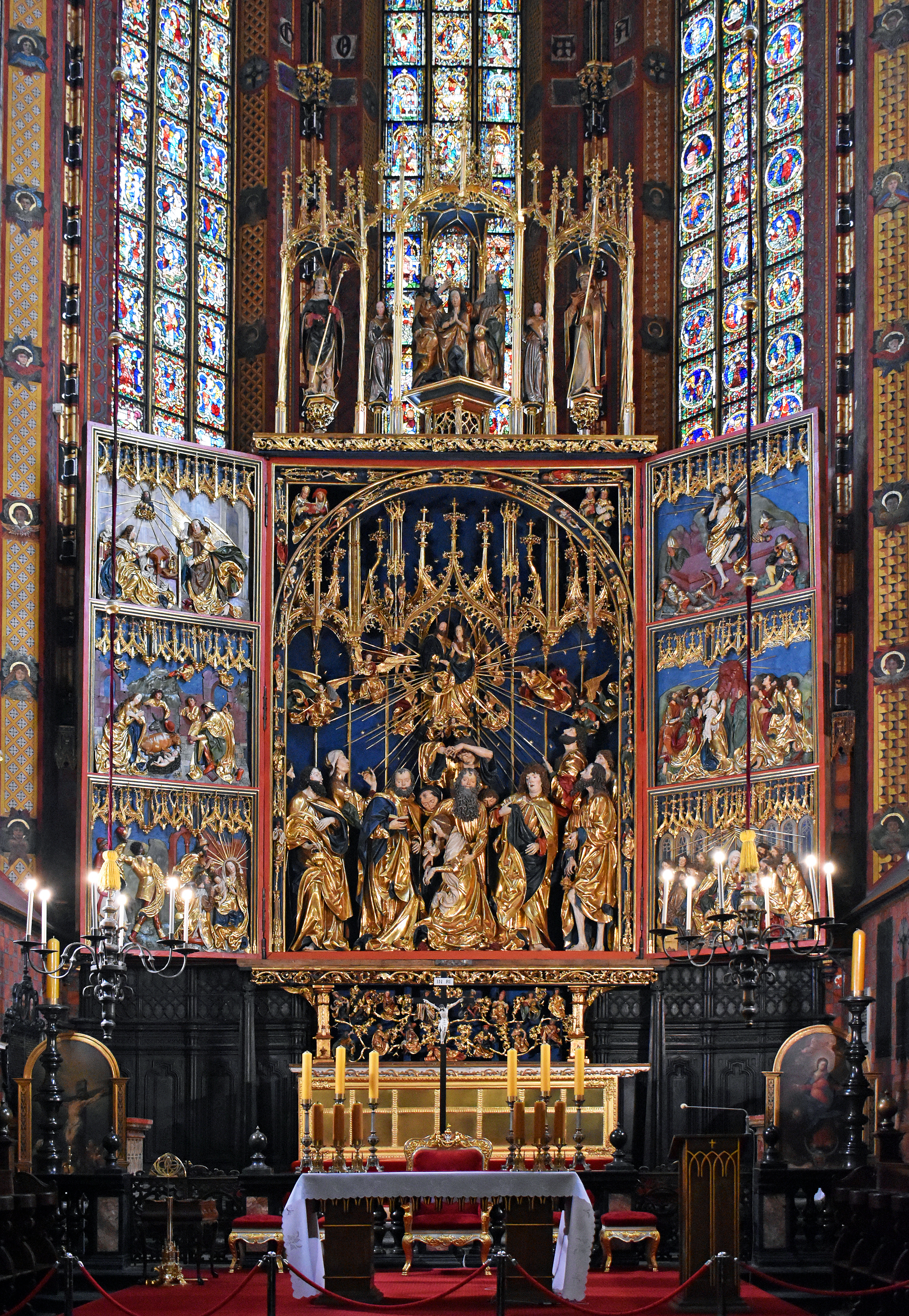
The altar of Veit Stoss

After the invasion of Poland in September 1939, Wolfram Sievers wrote to Himmler stressing the need to appropriate exhibits from numerous museums. Reich Security Main Office (RSHA) Standartenführer Franz Six oversaw SS-Untersturmführer Peter Paulsen, who was commanding a small team that entered Kraków to obtain the 15th-century Veit Stoss altar. Because the Poles had foreseen the German interest in the altar, they had disassembled it into 32 pieces, which were shipped to different locations, but Paulsen located each piece, and on October 14, 1939, he returned to Berlin with the altar in three small trucks and had it stored in the locked treasury of the Reichsbank. After conferring with Hitler, who had not initially been told of the operation to capture it, it was decided to send the altar to an underground vault in Nuremberg, for safety.

Reinhard Heydrich, then head of RSHA, sent Paulsen back to Kraków in order to seize additional museum collections, but Göring had already sent a team of his own men, commanded by SS-Sturmbannführer Kajetan Mühlmann under the supervision of Dagobert Frey, to loot the museums. Mühlmann agreed to let Paulsen take items of scholarly interest back to the Ahnenerbe, while keeping artworks for Göring. During the looting, Hans Frank, the head of the German General Government in occupied Poland, issued an order dated November 22, 1939 prohibiting the “unapproved export” of Polish items. Paulsen obeyed the order, but his colleague Hans Schleif arranged for five freightcars of loot from the Warsaw Archaeological Museum to be shipped to Poznań, which was outside Frank's control. In return, Schleif was appointed as a trustee for Wartheland. Paulsen later tried to take credit for the freightcars' contents in his report to RuSHA, but was reassigned.

Eduard Paul Tratz of the Ahnenerbe also removed some exhibits from the State Zoological Museum in Warsaw to the Haus der Natur, the museum in Salzburg of which he was founder and director.

=== Crimea ===
After the German Army conquered the Crimea in early July 1942, Himmler sent Herbert Jankuhn, as well as Karl Kersten and Baron Wolf von Seefeld, to the region in search of artifacts to follow up the recent display of the Kerch "Gothic crown of the Crimea" in Berlin.

Jankuhn met with senior officers of Einsatzkommando 11, part of Einsatzgruppe D, while waiting at the field headquarters of the 5th SS Panzer Division. Commander Otto Ohlendorf gave Jankuhn information about the Crimean museums. Traveling with the 5th SS Panzer, Jankuhn's team eventually reached Maykop, where they received a message from Sievers that Himmler wanted an investigation of Mangup Kale, an ancient mountain fortress. Jankuhn sent Kersten to follow up on Mangup Kale, while the rest of the team continued trying to secure artifacts that had not already been taken by the Red Army. Einsatzkommando 11b's commander Werner Braune aided the team.

Jankuhn was ultimately unable to find Gothic artifacts denoting a German ancestry, even after intelligence about a shipment of 72 crates of artifacts shipped to a medical warehouse. The area had been ravaged by the time the team arrived and only 20 crates remained, but they contained Greek and stone-age artifacts, rather than Gothic.

=== Ukraine ===
In June 1943, 27-year-old SS-Untersturmführer Heinz Brücher, who held a PhD from Tübingen in botany, was tasked with an expedition to Ukraine and Crimea. SS-Hauptsturmführer Konrad von Rauch and an interpreter identified as Steinbrecher were also involved in the expedition.

In February 1945, Brücher was ordered to destroy the Ahnenerbe's 18 active research facilities to avoid their capture by advancing Soviet forces. He refused, and after the war continued his work as a botanist in Argentina and Trinidad.

== Cancelled expeditions ==
=== Bolivia ===
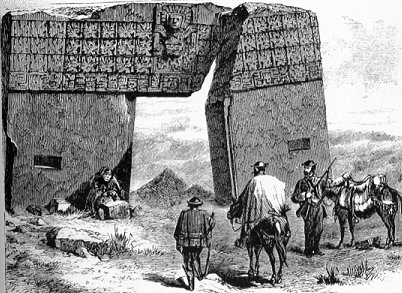
The Gate of the Sun in Tiwanaku, South America

After winning 20,000 ℛ︁ℳ︁ in a writing contest, Edmund Kiss traveled to Bolivia in 1928 to study the ruins of temples in the Andes. He claimed that their apparent similarity to ancient European structures indicated that they had been designed by Nordic migrants millions of years earlier. He also claimed that his findings supported the World Ice Theory, which held that the universe originated from a cataclysmic clash between gigantic balls of ice and glowing mass. Arthur Posnansky had been studying a local site called Tiwanaku, which he also believed supported the theory. (In reality, Tiwanuku was built in the 1st millennium AD by Amerindian peoples.)

After contacting Posnansky, Kiss approached Wüst for help planning an expedition to excavate Tiwanaku and a nearby site, Siminake. The team would consist of 20 scientists, who would excavate for a year and also explore Lake Titicaca, and take aerial photographs of ancient Incan roads they believed had Nordic roots. By late August 1939, the expedition was nearly set to embark, but the invasion of Poland caused the expedition to be postponed indefinitely.

=== Iran ===
In 1938, the Ahnenerbe's president, Walther Wüst, proposed a trip to Iran to study the Behistun Inscription, which had been created by order of the Achaemenid Shah Darius I, who had declared himself to have been of Aryan origin in his inscriptions. The inscriptions were recorded atop steep cliffs using scaffolding that was removed after the inscriptions were made. Unable to afford the cost of erecting new scaffolds, Wüst proposed that he, his wife, an amanuensis, an Iranian student (Davud Monshizadeh), a photographer and an experienced mountaineer be sent with a balloon-mounted camera. The onset of the war, however, saw the trip postponed indefinitely.

=== Canary Islands ===
Early travelers to the Canary Islands had described the Guanche natives as having golden-blond hair and white skin, and mummies had been found with blond tresses—facts which Wirth believed indicated that the islands had once been inhabited by Nordics. His colleague Otto Huth proposed an autumn of 1939 expedition to study the ancient islanders’ racial origins, artifacts and religious rites. At the time, the Canary Islands were part of Francisco Franco’s fascist Spanish State (Estado Español). Because Franco refused to side with the Axis when the war started, however, the trip was cancelled.

=== Iceland ===
Bruno Schweizer had already traveled to Iceland three times in 1938 when he proposed an Ahnenerbe expedition with seven others to the country in order to learn about their ancient farming practices and architecture, record folksongs and dances, and also collect soil samples for pollen analysis.

The first setback for the expedition was the ridicule of the Scandinavian press, publishing stories in February 1939 claiming the expedition was based on false ideas about Icelandic heritage and sought old church records that did not even exist. An enraged Himmler publicly shut down the trip, but after calming down he allowed the planning of the trip to be secretly continued. The final setback occurred when Himmler's personal staff was unable to get enough Icelandic crowns—Iceland's currency. Not being able to quickly solve this problem, the trip was rescheduled for the summer of 1940. In May 1940, the British invaded neutral Iceland, but when the war had started the expedition had already been shelved.

In 1940, following the Allied occupation of Iceland, the Ahnenerbe-funded Bruno Kress, a German researcher who was in the country at the time, was rounded up along with other German nationals present on the island. Kress was interned in Ramsey on the Isle of Man, but was allowed to correspond with Sievers through letters. Kress's Grammar of Icelandic was eventually published in East Germany in 1955.

== Other Ahnenerbe activities ==
=== Master Plan East ===
Plan of new German settlement colonies (marked with dots and diamonds), drawn up by the Friedrich Wilhelm University Institute of Agriculture in Berlin, 1942, covering the Baltic states, Poland, Belarus, Ukraine and Crimea

After being appointed Commissioner for the Strengthening of the German Race, Himmler set to work with Konrad Meyer on developing a plan for three large German colonies in the eastern occupied territories. Leningrad, northern Poland and the Crimea would be the focal points of these colonies intended to spread the Aryan race. The Crimean colony was called Gotengau, "Goth district", in honor of the Crimean Goths who had settled there and were believed to be Aryan ancestors of the Germans.

Himmler estimated that Aryanization of the region would take twenty years, first expelling all the undesirable populations, then re-distributing the territory to appropriate Aryan populations. In addition to changing the demographics of the region, Himmler also intended to plant oak and beech trees to replicate traditional German forests, as well as plant new crops brought back from Tibet. To achieve the latter end, Himmler ordered a new institution set up by the Ahnenerbe and headed by Schäfer. A station was then set up near the Austrian town of Graz where Schäfer set to work with seven other scientists to develop new crops for the Reich.

The final piece of the puzzle fell into place after Hitler read a work by Alfred Frauenfeld which suggested resettling inhabitants of South Tyrol, believed by some to be descendants of the Goths, to Crimea. In 1939 the South Tyroleans were ordered by Hitler and Benito Mussolini to vote on whether they wanted to remain in Italy and accept assimilation or emigrate to Germany. Over 80% chose the latter (for details see South Tyrol Option Agreement). Himmler presented the Generalplan Ost, 'Master Plan East' to Hitler and received approval in July 1942.

Full implementation of the plan was not feasible because of the war, but a small colony was founded around Himmler's field headquarters at Hegewald, near Kiev. Starting on October 10, 1942, Himmler's troops deported 10,623 Ukrainians from the area in cattle cars before bringing in trains of ethnic Germans (Volksdeutsche) from northern Ukraine. The SS authorities gave families supplies as well as land, but also informed them of quotas of food they would be required to produce for the SS.

=== Failed seizure of Tacitus manuscript ===
The Ahnenerbe had tried to gain possession of the Codex Aesinas, a famous medieval copy of Tacitus' Germania. Although Mussolini had originally promised it as a gift in 1936, it remained in the possession of the Count Aurelio Baldeschi Guglielmi Balleani outside Ancona, from where the Ahnenerbe tried to obtain it after Mussolini was deposed.

=== Headquarters relocation ===
On July 29, 1943, the Royal Air Force's firebombing of Hamburg led Himmler to order the immediate evacuation of the main Ahnenerbe headquarters in Berlin. The extensive library was moved to Schloss Oberkirchberg near Ulm while the staff was moved to the tiny village of Waischenfeld near Bayreuth, Bavaria. The building selected was the 17th century Steinhaus. While much of the staff was not ecstatic about the primitive conditions, Sievers seemed to have embraced the isolation.

== Financing ==
Financially, the Ahnenerbe was separate from the Nazi Party treasury and had to find funding from other sources including membership dues and donations. After 1938, it received funds from the Deutsche Forschungsgemeinschaft. In addition, a foundation (Ahnenerbe-Stifterverband) was established, set up with funds from business leaders. One of the largest donations, approximately 50,000 ℛ︁ℳ︁, came from Deutsche Bank boardmember Emil Georg von Stauß associates, including BMW and Daimler-Benz. The foundation also received royalties from patents partially held by the SS (see below). During the war, Ahnenerbe also received money from other SS departments and profited from the Arisierung of Jewish property—its headquarters in Dahlem had been purchased at half its market value. In 1940, another estate in Munich was added.

In 1936, the SS formed a joint company with Anton Loibl, a machinist and driving instructor. The SS had heard about reflector pedals for bicycles, that Loibl and others had been developing. Assuring that Loibl got the patent himself, Himmler then used his political weight to ensure the passing of a 1939 law requiring the use of the new reflective pedals—of which the Ahnenerbe received a share of the profits, 77,740 ℛ︁ℳ︁ in 1938.

== Medical experiments ==
The Institut für Wehrwissenschaftliche Zweckforschung ("Institute for Military Scientific Research"), which conducted extensive medical experiments using human subjects, became attached to the Ahnenerbe during World War II. It was managed by Wolfram Sievers. Sievers had founded the organization on the orders of Himmler, who appointed him director with two divisions headed by Sigmund Rascher and August Hirt, and funded by the Waffen-SS.

=== Dachau ===
Sigmund Rascher was tasked with helping the Luftwaffe determine what was safe for their pilots—because aircraft were being built to fly higher than ever before. He applied for and received permission from Himmler to requisition camp prisoners to place in vacuum chambers to simulate the high altitude conditions that pilots might face.

Rascher was also tasked with discovering how long German airmen would be able to survive if shot down above freezing water. His victims were forced to remain out of doors naked in freezing weather for up to 14 hours, or kept in a tank of icewater for 3 hours, their pulse and internal temperature measured through a series of electrodes. Warming of the victim was then attempted by different methods, most usually and successfully by immersion in very hot water, and also less conventional methods such as placing the subject in bed with women who would try to sexually stimulate him, a method suggested by Himmler.

Rascher experimented with the effects of Polygal, a substance made from beets and apple pectin, on coagulating blood flow to help with gunshot wounds. Subjects were given a Polygal tablet, and shot through the neck or chest, or their limbs amputated without anaesthesia. Rascher published an article on his experience of using Polygal, without detailing the nature of the human trials, and also set up a company to manufacture the substance, staffed by prisoners.

Similar experiments were conducted from July to September 1944, as the Ahnenerbe provided space and materials to doctors at Dachau concentration camp to undertake “seawater experiments”, chiefly through Sievers. Sievers is known to have visited Dachau on July 20, to speak with Ploetner and the non-Ahnenerbe Wilhelm Beiglboeck, who ultimately carried out the experiments.

=== Skulls ===
Walter Greite rose to leadership of the Ahnenerbe's Applied Nature Studies division in January 1939, and began taking detailed measurements of 2,000 Jews at the Vienna emigration office—but scientists were unable to use the data. On December 10, 1941, Bruno Beger met with Sievers and convinced him of the need for 120 Jewish skulls. During the later Nuremberg Trials, Friedrich Hielscher testified that Sievers had initially been repulsed at the idea of expanding the Ahnenerbe to human experimentation, and that he had “no desire whatsoever to participate in these.”

- Jewish skull collection: Beger collaborated with August Hirt, of the Reich University of Strassburg, in creating a Jewish skeleton collection for research. The bodies of 86 Jewish men and women were ultimately collected and macerated.

== Post-World War II ==
=== Trials ===
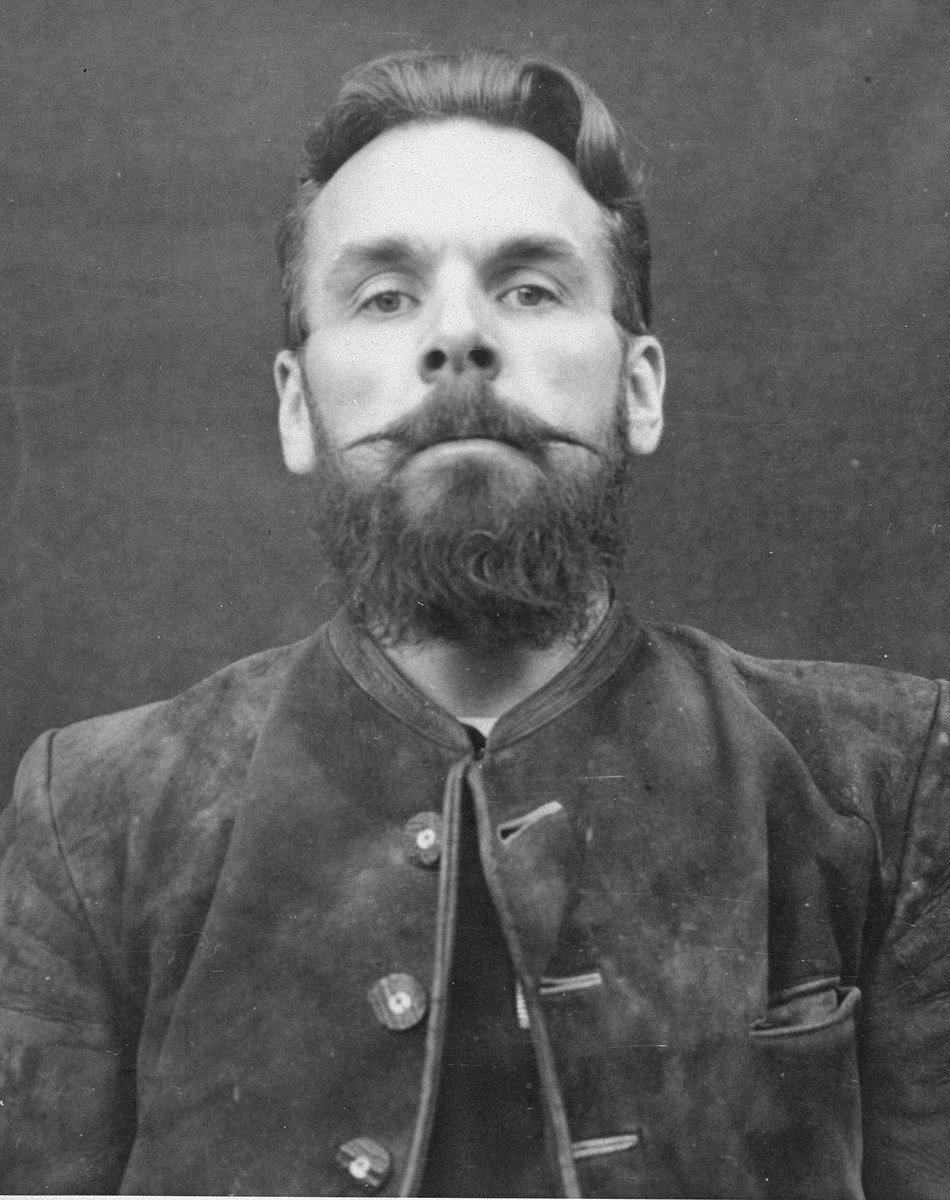
Wolfram Sievers

- Wolfram Sievers: In Waischenfeld American troops captured a slew of documents that would be used in the case against Sievers which would be a part of the Doctors' Trial. Sievers was charged for aiding in the Jewish skull collection and human medical experiments at Dachau and Natzweiler. In his defense, Sievers claimed he had helped a resistance group since 1929, which was supported by testimony from Friedrich Hielscher on April 15, 1947. Sievers was nevertheless found guilty on all four counts on August 21, 1947, and sentenced to death. He was hanged on June 2, 1948, at Landsberg Prison.
- Richard Walther Darré: One of the founders of the Ahnenerbe, Darré was tried in the Ministries Trial. He received seven years imprisonment after being found not guilty on more serious charges.
- Edmund Kiss: His Bolivia trip having been cancelled, Kiss served in the armed forces the rest of the war, taking command of SS men at Wolfschanze near the end. He was interned in the Darmstadt camp after the war, but was released in June 1947 due to severe diabetes. His de-Nazification classification was as a "major offender". This allowed him to only take a manual labor job. Following this decision, Kiss hired a lawyer to protest this decision, a major component of his case being he had never been a member of the Nazi Party. After somewhat renouncing his past, Kiss was reclassified as a Mitläufer in 1948 and fined 501 DM.
- Walther Wüst: Although the president of the Ahnenerbe from 1937 until the end of the war, Wüst's claims that he was unaware of any medical experiments were acknowledged, and in 1950 he was classified as a Mitläufer and released, returning to LMU Munich as a professor-in-reserve.
- Bruno Beger: In February 1948, Beger was classified as "exonerated" by a denazification tribunal unaware of his role in the skeleton collection. In 1960, an investigation into the collection began in Ludwigsburg, and Beger was taken into custody on March 30, 1960. He was released four months later, but the investigation continued until coming to trial on October 27, 1970. Beger claimed that he was unaware the Auschwitz prisoners he measured were to be killed. While two others indicted in the trial were released, Beger was convicted on April 6, 1971, and sentenced to three years in prison for being an accomplice in the murder of 86 Jews. Neither of his colleagues with whom he was tried, Hans Fleischhacker and Wolf-Dietrich Wolff, was convicted.

== Legacy ==
=== Academic study ===
During the 20th century, little scholarly research into the Ahnenerbe took place. Many scholars had likely been dissuaded from exploring the subject because ex-Ahnenerbe members held prominent academic positions in West Germany and did not want younger historians or archaeologists investigating their links with the SS. The main scholar to explore the subject in this period was a Canadian historian, Michael Kater, who conducted his research while in Germany. As the University of Heidelberg sought to publish Kater's thesis on the subject in 1966, Walther Wüst unsuccessfully tried to legally prevent it from doing so. Kater's research was then published in 1974 as Das "Ahnenerbe" der SS 1935–1945.

Following German unification in 1990, Achim Leube began an examination of the surviving historical evidence on the Ahnenerbe, much of which had been based in West Germany. In November 1998, Leube oversaw an international academic conference in Berlin on the Nazis' relationship with prehistory.

=== Influence in pseudo-archaeology ===
Many of the ideas inherited or developed by the Ahnenerbe remain influential. Canadian author Heather Pringle has particularly drawn attention to the influence of Edmund Kiss' various "crackpot theories" concerning such matters as the World Ice Theory and the origins of Tiwanaku upon subsequent writers such as H.S. Bellamy and Denis Saurat.

== In popular culture ==
Much misinformation about the Ahnenerbe has circulated, due in part to adaptations of the group in fiction, and historically dubious conspiracy theories that sometimes confuse the Ahnenerbe with the roughly contemporaneous Thule Society, or the historically unverified Vril society.

The Ahnenerbe formed the basis for the depiction in the Indiana Jones franchise of Nazis searching for religious artifacts.

== See also ==
- Deutsche Physik and Deutsche Mathematik
- List of Nazi Party organizations
- List of Ahnenerbe institutes
- Nazi mysticism
- Reich Research Council
- Kokugaku – a similar project to recapture legendary heritage in Japan

== Bibliography ==
- Hale, Christopher (2007). Himmler's Crusade: The Nazi Expedition to Find the Origins of the Aryan Race. Secaucus: Castle Books. ISBN 978-0-7858-2254-7.
- Pringle, Heather (2006). The Master Plan: Himmler's Scholars and the Holocaust. New York: Hyperion. ISBN 978-0-7868-6886-5.
- Цибулькін В. В., Лисюк І. П. СС-Аненербе: розсекречені файли. – К. – Хмельницький: Поділля, 2010. – 288 с. (Tsibulkin V.V., Lysyuk I.P. (2010). SS-Anenerbe: declassified files. - K. - (in Ukrainian). Khmelnytskyi: Podillia)
