= Anton Loibl GmbH =

Nazi German bicycle reflector company

- Industry: Bicycle reflectors
- Founded: September 1936
- Founder: Himmler's Personal Office
- Owner: Anton Loibl

Anton Loibl GmbH was a company owned by the SS which was a funding source for the Ahnenerbe research branch and the Lebensborn eugenics programme. It was created to market a bicycle reflector invented by Anton Loibl, a chauffeur for Hitler. It employed slave labour.

Anton Loibl, a former long-term chauffeur for Hitler and a decorated SS-Hauptsturmführer (Ernst Röhm had obtained the driver's job for him in the early 1920s, and he had spent time in prison after participating in the Beerhall Putsch in 1923), was a part-time inventor; while working as a machinist and driving instructor, he invented a reflector for bicycle pedals which incorporated glass chips. Heinrich Himmler, who was acquainted with Loibl, ensured that he was awarded the patent in preference to an earlier applicant, and the company was established in September 1936 in Berlin by Himmler's Personal Office in order to market it. In his capacity as police chief of the Reich, Himmler had a requirement added to the traffic code on 13 November 1937 which required all newly manufactured bicycles to incorporate these reflectors. The bicycle manufacturers had to pay a licence fee, which amounted to 600,000 Reichsmark (RM) in 1939.

Loibl was initially a co-director and co-owner of the company, and received 50% of the income, altogether approximately RM 500,000& he was removed for incompetence at the end of 1939 or early in 1940. (An internal report dated June 1939 pointed out Himmler's use of his power for the benefit of the company and criticised Loibl's personally profiting from it.) Additionally, Himmler directed the company to pay substantial sums (RM 290,000 a year) to the Ahnenerbe and the Lebensborn; financing these had been the primary purpose of its establishment. The Ahnenerbe had chronic financing problems for some years and in 1937 the Reichsnährstand had reduced its funding and Himmler set up a foundation to channel funds to it, including from the Loibl concern. The Ahnenerbe's share of the Loibl funds was RM 77,740 in 1938; the Lebensborn received from 100,000 to 150,000 per year from 1939 on. At the Nuremberg Trials the Loibl company was described as "still earning considerable funds for 'Ahnenerbe'".

Chartered to develop "technical articles of all kinds", the company later diversified and also sold other products, such as a patented lamp.

By the end of the 1930s, when Germany had achieved full employment, the SS enterprises were using slave labour, including from concentration camps. In January 1938, Loibl showed a visitor around a testing laboratory for aircraft motors at Dachau.

In December 1963 the reflectors were still required on German bicycles.
