= Kurt Plötner =

SS officer and physician (1905–1984)

Kurt Friedrich Plötner (19 October 1905 – 26 February 1984) was a Nazi Party member and medical doctor who conducted human experimentation on Jews and Soviet prisoners of war in German concentration camps. American intelligence recruited him to work for the United States in 1945. He returned to the medical field as a professor at the University of Freiburg in West Germany after working for the United States and living under an alias.

== Biography ==
Kurt Friedrich Plötner was born in Hermsdorf on October 19, 1905. A devoted Nazi as well as a Leipzig lecturer and researcher, he joined the SS as a physician in the 1930s, reaching the SS rank of Sturmbannführer.

Plötner participated in a series of research tasks involving human experimentation at the Dachau concentration camp during World War II. These included participation in the malaria experiments of Claus Schilling, in which prisoners were injected with drugs at lethal doses. In 1944, he was given Dachau physician Sigmund Rascher's role as head of the "Department R" of the Ahnenerbe project for carrying out experimental work on living subjects. Plötner also administered the hallucinogen mescaline to Jews and Russian prisoners, watching them display schizophrenic behavior, as part of the Nazi search for a truth serum that could be employed as an aid in interrogations.

=== Hired by the Americans, 1945 ===
Plötner's work in the concentration camps came to the attention of Boris Pash, an American intelligence officer who would go on to work in the CIA at the time of Project BLUEBIRD in the early 1950s, and the United States Navy's intelligence officers recruited him in 1945, permitting him to continue his interrogation research. Though Plötner's tenure working in the United States was allegedly brief, many of his experiments would later be used as groundwork for experiments conducted by the CIA during Project MK Ultra.

=== Resumed civilian life, 1945-1955 ===
Plötner proceeded to live under the name of "Schmitt" in Schleswig-Holstein into the early 1950s.

Despite Plötner's residence in this western German zone, when the French government sought to have Plötner prosecuted in 1946 and appealed to the United States for assistance, the Americans replied that he could not be located, and was probably being shielded by the Soviet Union. He subsequently was able to quietly resume his real identity in 1952, at which time he was hired by the University of Freiburg in West Germany. He became an associate professor in 1954.

== See also ==
- Nazi human experimentation
- Operation Paperclip
