= Rock carvings in Backa =

Coordinates: 58°24′9.54″N 11°29′23.9″E

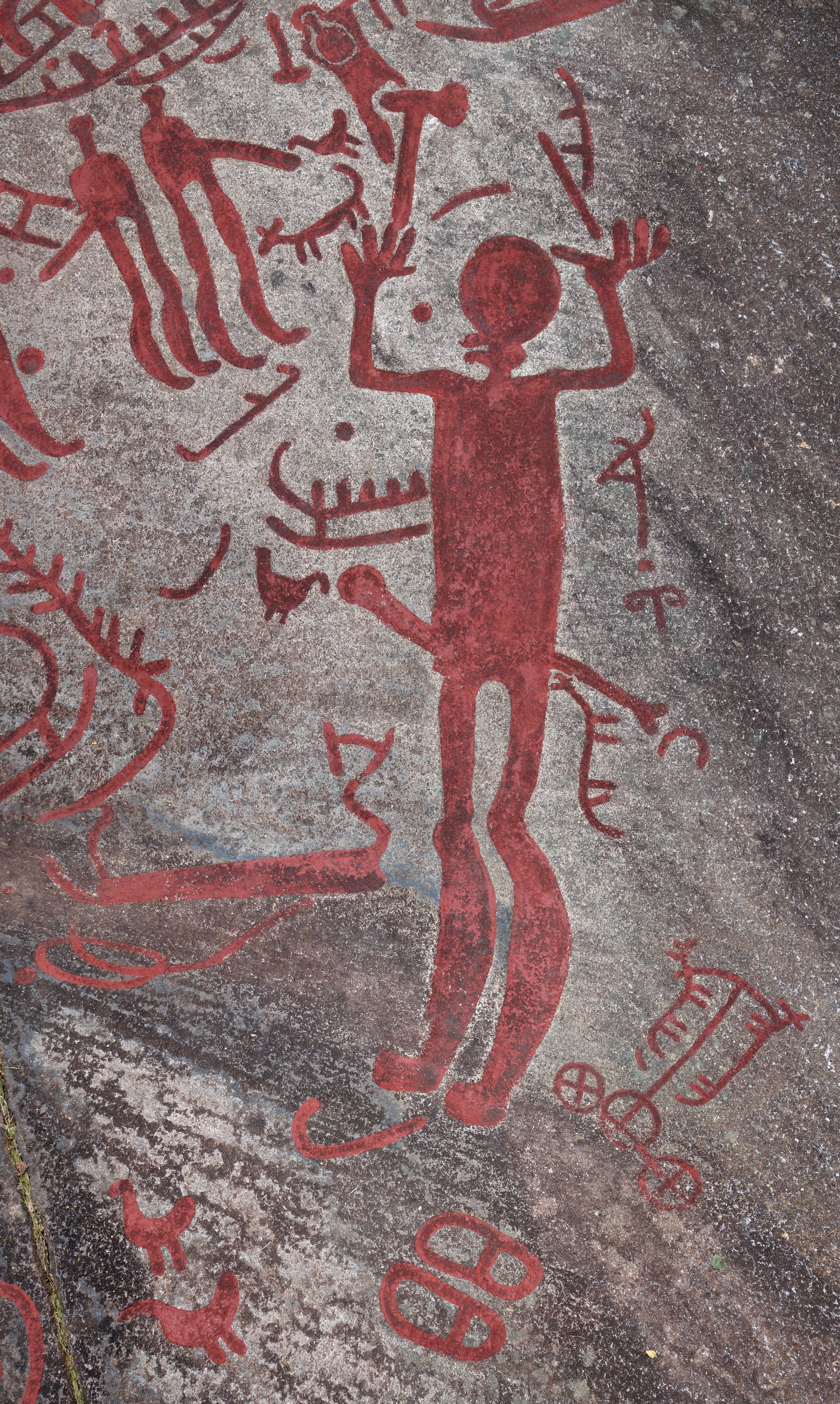
The Cobbler, a detail of the Bronze Age petroglyphs at Cobbler's Cliff in Backa Petroglyph Area Brastad, Lysekil Municipality, Sweden.

The rock carvings in Backa in Lysekil Municipality is one of the largest and intriguing petroglyph areas in Bohuslän, Sweden. It is located at the foot of a long mountain and next to the road through the village. It is intriguing because the area is located 43 meters over the sea and the tectonic uplift of this area has only amounted to 10-15 meters meaning this area has always been far away from the sea. The usual location of a petroglyph is close to a body of water, such as a sea bay.

The carvings are from the Nordic Bronze Age, and consist of some 600 petroglyphs on 32 surfaces on exposed rock in an area about a kilometer long. The motifs are ships, chariots, sun symbols, footprints and humans. The northernmost and most famous carving is the so-called Cobbler, a 1.5 meter tall male figure holding an axe in his raised hand. The Cobbler was discovered by chance, described and depicted already in 1627 by the Norwegian scholar Peder Alfssön and marked the start of petroglyph research in Scandinavia.

== Written sources ==
- Med arkeologen Sverige runt, Bokförlaget Forum, 1987, ISBN 91-37-09153-0
