= Bruno Schweizer =

German linguist (1897–1958)

Bruno Schweizer (3 May 1897 in Dießen am Ammersee - 11 November 1958) was a German linguist, best known for his work with the Nazi Ahnenerbe division. Schweizer was a personal believer in the theory that a Germanic stronghold in northeastern Italy gave rise to the Cimbrians, during the Middle Ages before and after its alleged end in 774.

On 10 March 1938, Schweizer organised an Ahnenerbe-sponsored expedition to Iceland, hoping to discover shrines to the Norse gods Odin or Thor. During the expedition later that year, he sent back correspondence to Heinrich Himmler complaining that the Icelandic people had abandoned traditional crafts such as forging, wood-carving, spinning, weaving and dyeing; and that they had also forgotten their traditional myths and legends, thus losing belief in the ‘transcendent nature’ that the Ahnenerbe held dearly to. The mission was eventually aborted, citing uncooperative Icelandic government officials who restricted access to certain locations.

While Schweizer's tight commitment to Germanic racism is disputable, his linguistic works are fully acknowledged and appreciated by former and present linguists.

== Literature ==
- Schweizer, Bruno (2008): Zimbrische Gesamtgrammatik. Vergleichende Darstellung der zimbrischen Dialekte. Herausgegeben von James R. Dow. – Franz Steiner Verlag, Stuttgart. ISBN 978-3-515-09053-7
