= Eduard Paul Tratz =

Austrian zoologist (1888–1977)

Eduard Paul Tratz (25 September 1888, in Salzburg – 5 January 1977, in Salzburg) was an Austrian zoologist.

== Ahnenerbe ==
Tratz was the founder of Salzburg's Haus der Natur, one of the leading museums of natural history in Austria, in 1924. A member of the Nazi Party, he ensured significant funding for the museum after the Anschluss and spent much of it adding eight new areas dealing with such topics as eugenics and racial hygiene. He played a leading role in helping to popularise "Rassenkunde" in Austria and was also a departmental head in the Ahnenerbe (and thus entitled to officer rank in the Schutzstaffel).

In late 1939, Tratz was one of a number of leading scholars chosen by Wolfram Sievers to be sent to Poland in order to help plunder the country's museums. His main port of call was the State Zoological Museum in Warsaw, where his haul included 147 rare birds, three wisents, two wildcats, a Nile crocodile, numerous skeletons and prehistoric skeleton parts and twelve rare reference books, all sent to his own museum in Salzburg.

== Post-war ==
After the Second World War Tratz was interned for two years before being adjudged a "lesser activist" and then was allowed to return to his role as director of the Haus der Natur in 1949. Whilst many of the exhibits he had plundered were returned to Warsaw plaster casts of supposed ideal types of Nordic and Jewish "races" remained on display into the 1990s. A bust of Tratz is situated near the museum's entrance.

== Bonobo research ==
Tratz also worked with Heinz Heck on a comparative study examining chimpanzees and bonobos, most of the work for which was done during the Second World War at Munich's Hellabrunn Zoo. The study, which was not published until after the war, noted a list of eight differences between the two species, which at the time were believed to be very closely related or even identical, mainly focusing on the more passive and vocal nature of the bonobo and their preference for human-like face to face sexual intercourse instead of the dog-like copulation utilised by chimpanzees. The research was largely ignored internationally, in part because it was not published in English language although a general distrust of research findings based on zoo animals also damaged its credibility. However, later research undertaken in the wild largely supported Tratz and Heck's conclusions and the work became recognised as groundbreaking.
