= Germanische Leitstelle =

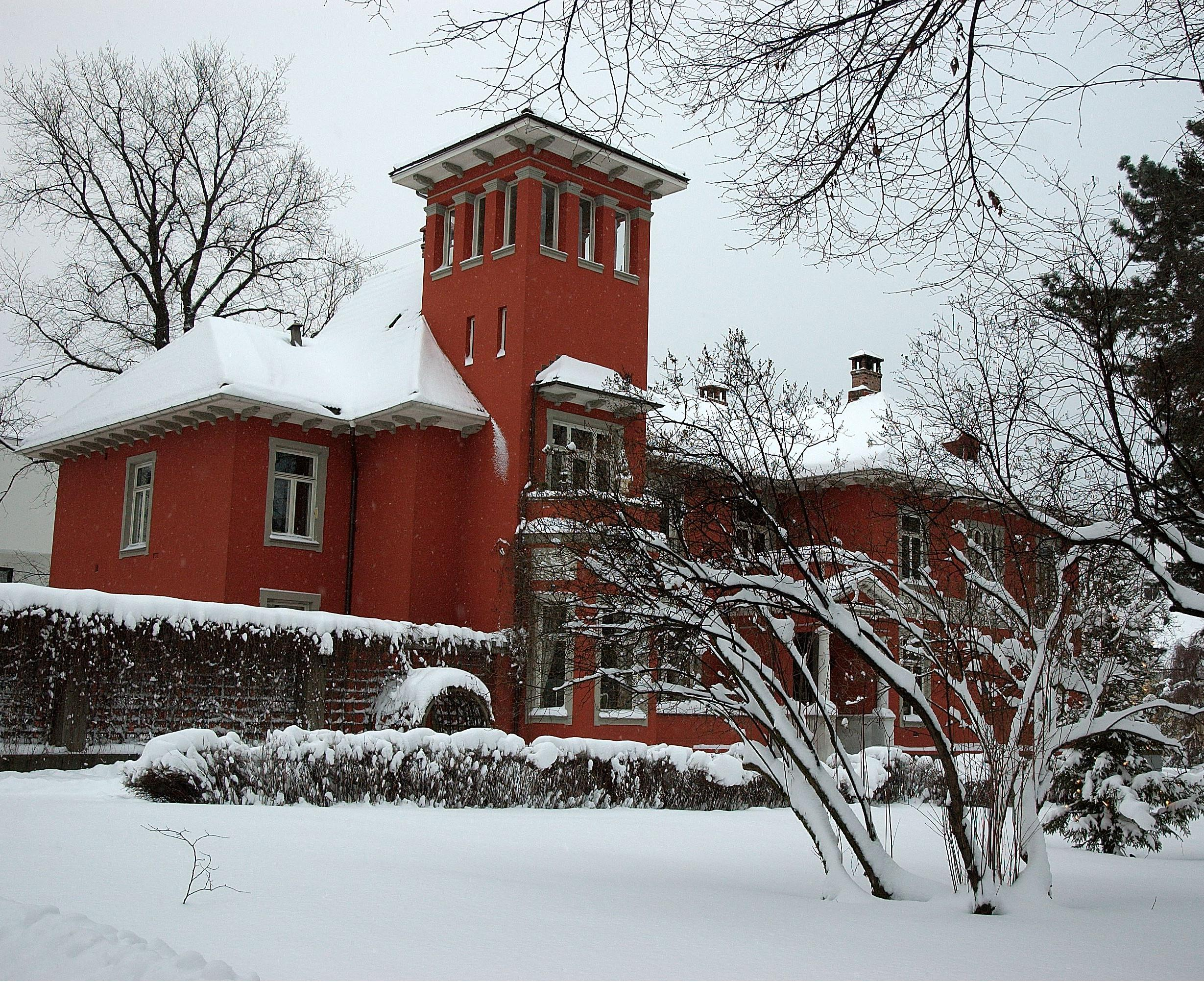
Drammensveien 99 in Oslo, the villa containing the offices of Germanische Leitstelle in Norway as well as Ahnenerbe's Norwegian mission 1941–43

During World War II, Germanische Leitstelle was a department of the SS-Hauptamt under the command of Obergruppenführer Gottlob Berger. It oversaw the recruitment and propaganda offices for the Waffen SS in Oslo, Copenhagen, Brussels and The Hague.

== The Germanische Leitstelle in Norway ==
The Oslo office was established in 1941 and led by Karl Leib, the son-in-law of Gottlob Berger. It was headquartered in Drammensveien 99 until 1943, when it moved to Colbjørnsens gate 1.

The Germanische Leitstelle published the Germanic Messenger (Germansk Budstikke) and SS-Heftet, which was the Norwegian edition of SS-Leitheft. It was also tasked with coordinating the scientific work of the SS, and hosted the Ahnenerbe mission in Norway, led by Hans Schwalm.
