= Walther Wüst =

German Indologist (1901–1993)

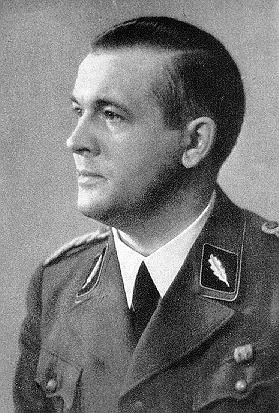
- Born: 7 May 1901; Kaiserslautern, German Empire
- Died: 21 March 1993 (aged 91); Munich, Germany

Academic background
- Education: Ludwig-Maximilians-Universität München

Academic work
- Discipline: Indology
- Institutions: Ludwig-Maximilians-Universität München
- Notable students: Davud Monshizadeh; Karl Hoffmann
- Main interests: Rigveda

Walther Wüst (7 May 1901 – 21 March 1993) was a German Indologist who served as Rector of the Ludwig-Maximilians-Universität München from 1941 to 1945. He was an Oberführer in the SS and served as the President of the Ahnenerbe during the Nazi era.

== Biography ==
Walther Wüst was born in Kaiserslautern, Germany on 7 May 1901. He studied Indology and other subjects—including comparative religion, anthropological geography, and racial distribution and migration—at the Ludwig-Maximilians-Universität München, and became a specialist in the Vedas. Wüst immersed himself in the cultures of Persia and India while studying philology. He received his PhD at the age of 22 with a dissertation on the Rigveda and its relation to Indo-European mythology entitled Der Schaltsatz im Rigveda ("The Parenthetical Clause in the Rigveda"). (Note: Some of Wüst's early scholarly work can be viewed online. See for instance: Wüst, Walther. "Über das Alter des Ṛigveda und die Hauptfragen der indoarischen Frühgeschichte." Wiener Zeitschrift für die Kunde des Morgenlandes 34 (1927): 165–215. http://www.jstor.org/stable/23866766.)

After completing his studies, Wüst became a private lecturer in Sanskrit by 1926 and later a professor. In 1927, Wüst married a young woman from Munich named Bertha Schmid, who had given birth to a daughter just two months prior; despite the scandal this may have elicited in Catholic Bavaria, the young Wüst was unconcerned, since he cared little for Christianity.

He joined the Nazi Party on 1 May 1933, and subsequently became an agent of the SS's Sicherheitsdienst (SD); he was considered an SD Vertrauensmann, or informer and spy. He was and had been one for the SS Security Service. It seems Wüst's late enlistment cast doubt on his commitment to the Nazi cause, so he agreed to inform on his university colleagues and students for the SD. Sometime in 1934, he joined the National Socialist Teachers League and the National Socialist German Lecturers League. In early 1935, Wüst became Professor of Aryan Culture and Linguistics and Dean of the Faculty of Philosophy at the Ludwig-Maximilians-Universität München; he was considered an expert not only in Indo-European religion, but also in the migrations of the "Aryan" race. Notable students of Wüst included Davud Monshizadeh; he was also Doktorvater (Dissertation Chair) to the linguist Karl Hoffmann.

At the Bruckmann Verlag in Munich, Wüst first met Wolfram Sievers—at the time managing director of the fledgling Ahnenerbe—who subsequently introduced Wüst to the SS chief Heinrich Himmler. Impressed with Wüst and his research, Siever declared that spending time with the professor was akin to being in "a German cathedral where one gains insight and reflection." Sievers then persuaded Wüst to join the Ahnenerbe. Shortly thereafter, Himmler invited Wüst to his alpine chalet at lake Tegernsee where the two men discussed the professor's conviction about an ancient blue-eyed population from the Far East, which excited Himmler, who appointed Wüst as director of a new department inside the Ahnenerbe named the Wortkunde ("Word-lore") that the two established on the spot.

After this meeting, Wüst quickly began taking charge of the Ahnenerbe, adding personnel. Soon the organisation had thirty-eight employees. Historian Horst Junginger described Wüst as an opportunist who was only too eager to subordinate himself to the authority of the SS-leader (Himmler); thereby making him "a perfect collaborator of the Ahnenerbe." Moreover, given his credentials, Wüst was the "right man" to transform the organisation from an assembly of like-minded völkisch thinkers "into a scientific think tank". Himmler also charged Wüst to give speeches—crafted primarily after the one the professor gave in June 1936 titled "Hitler's Mein Kampf as a mirror of the Aryan worldview"—to members of the SS throughout Germany. Prominent themes in the speech included the superiority of the Aryan worldview over the Semitic one and the notion of Hitler's alleged self-sacrificing personality as evidence that proved his innate virtuousness.

His relationship with Himmler notwithstanding, Wüst advanced very quickly in the SS after joining on 26 January 1937; four days later he had become a Sturmbannführer and by 9 November 1942, Wüst had advanced several ranks to an SS-Oberführer, a position he held until the end of the Nazi régime. Wüst was generally considered a successful and adaptable figure in the Nazi research-network, adept at blending traditional conservative views—including commitments to unbiased scholarship—with key elements of National Socialist ideology.

Walther Wüst worked tirelessly to professionalize the Ahnenerbe, navigating eccentric research demands from Himmler—such as studies on Helgoland's healing springs, Germanic sexual customs, and runic inscriptions—while recruiting staff and expanding the institute's scope. Despite the often irrational nature of these projects, Wüst complied, believing he was contributing to Germany's future and drawn by his increasing influence within the SS hierarchy. Himmler, who saw Wüst as a trusted confidant and intellectual equal, gave him greater authority, allowing the Ahnenerbe to absorb rival SS departments. In 1938, the Ahnenerbe took over the SS Excavations Department, adding archaeological expertise to its previously text-focused mission. This expansion enabled the organisation to pursue pseudo-scientific projects aimed at proving the ancient supremacy of the mythical Nordic race, even as far back as the Paleolithic era. In that same year, Wüst was also editing the scholarly journal, Wörter und Sachen (Words and Things) along with Heidelberg Academy of Sciences and Humanities member and fellow linguist, Hermann Güntert.

As one of the heads of a Nazi organization committed to studying the Aryan and Nordic past, Wüst collaborated with scholars from the Saarforschungsgemeinschaft (Saarland Research Community) at the University of Bonn. These scholars and other members committed to the Nazi version of Ostforschung also worked with faculty at the Institut für die geschichtliche Landeskunde der Rheinlande (Institute for the Historical Geography of the Rhineland). Correspondingly, Wüst appears as a key figure within the SS's ideological-scientific apparatus, specifically through his role in the Ahnenerbe. Alongside Wolfram Sievers, he was responsible for recruiting figures like August Hirt and Bruno Beger, who carried out racially motivated anatomical research under SS auspices.

Wüst emphasized the role of universities by theoretically legitimizing the Third Reich’s dominance over Europe. Enthralled by the overwhelming force of the German Wehrmacht, he began contemplating the post-war future and the responsibilities of German academics within it. He was certain that National Socialist scholarship would once again become Praeceptor Europae—Europe’s teacher—and play a vital role in securing Nazi Germany’s supremacy throughout the coming millennium. His commitment to the Nazi cause reveals itself even further when as rector of the Ludwig-Maximilians-Universität München, he was directly involved in the arrest of Hans and Sophie Scholl, handing them over to the Gestapo.

Soviet archived diary entries from Himmler between 1941 and 1942, reveal that Wüst was present and acted as a translator for a meeting between the Reichsführer-SS and the Indian nationalist Subhas Chandra Bose. Wüst also appears in diary entries when Himmler was meeting with Dr. Sigmund Rascher about his high-altitude experiments at Dachau and shortly thereafter, he accompanied Himmler to review the extermination process at Auschwitz. Another example of Wüst's prominence within the Nazi regime was not only evidenced by his presence at Himmler's side, but when Reinhard Heydrich was murdered and his body returned to Germany for burial, it was Wüst who gave the SS leader's funeral oration.

== Arrest and post-war life ==
After the end of World War II in Europe, Wüst was arrested by the Office of Military Government, United States. He was interned for forty months after the war in Dachau, but American investigators struggled to build a case against him due to his cautious delegation of responsibilities and the destruction of key documents. Wüst denied any knowledge of human experiments and patently lied about the connection between the Ahnenerbe and the Institute for Military Scientific Research; instead, he portrayed the Ahnenerbe as a purely academic institution, frustrating investigators who noted his persistent self-exoneration. Ultimately, Wüst was not tried at Nuremberg and was classified as a "fellow traveler" in 1950, later finding modest work at the Bavarian State Library. Though many former Nazi academics reintegrated into academic life, Wüst remained on the margins, possibly by choice, working on obscure projects such as the role of bears in prehistory. In the 1950s and '60s, renewed investigations by the Central Office in Ludwigsburg uncovered evidence of Wüst’s involvement in SS medical research, including his recommendation of a promotion for a scientist conducting mustard gas experiments on prisoners. However, lacking definitive proof of criminal responsibility, the case was closed in 1972, and Wüst lived out his days claiming innocence. He died on 21 March 1993.

== See also ==
- Hans Reinerth

== Bibliography ==
- Adhami, Siamak (March 11, 2021). "Monchi-Zadeh, Davoud". Encyclopaedia Iranica. iranicaonline.org.
- Ingrao, Christian (2013). Believe and Destroy: Intellectuals in the SS War Machine. Malden, MA: Polity. ISBN 978-0-74566-026-4.
- Junginger, Horst (2008). "From Buddha to Adolf Hitler: Walther Wüst and the Aryan Tradition". In Horst Junginger (ed.). The Study of Religion Under the Impact of Fascism. New York: MacMillan. pp. 107–177. ISBN 978-9-00416-326-3.
- Kater, Michael Hans (16 December 2009) [1974]. "Die ersten Jahre, 1936-1937: Walther Wüst und Joseph Otto Plaßmann". Das "Ahnenerbe" der SS 1935-1945: Ein Beitrag zur Kulturpolitik des Dritten Reiches. Studien zur Zeitgeschichte, volume 6 (in German). Munich: Oldenbourg Verlag. p. 43. ISBN 978-3-48659-468-3.
- Klee, Ernst (2016). Personenlexikon zum Dritten Reich: Wer war was vor und nach 1945 (in German). Hamburg: Nikol Verlag. ISBN 978-3-86820-311-0.
- Polsue, Edward (2023). "Being Aryan, a Myth Many Iranians Choose to Believe (August 7, 2023)".
- Pringle, Heather (2006). The Master Plan: Himmler's Scholars and the Holocaust. London: Fourth Estate. ISBN 978-0-00714-812-7.
- Remy, Steven P. (2007). "The Humanities and National Socialism at Heidelberg". In Wolfgang Bialas; Anson Rabinbach (eds.). Nazi Germany and the Humanities: How German Academics Embraced Nazism. Oneworld. pp. 21–49.
- Schreiber, Maximilian Schreiber (2007). Walther Wüst: Dekan und Rektor der Universität München, 1935–1945. München: Utzverlag GmbH. ISBN 978-3-83160-676-4.
- Schreiber, Maximilian (2008). Kraus, Elisabeth (ed.). "Band 3: Walther Wüst - Dekan und Rektor der Universität München 1935–1945" [Walther Wüst - Dean and Rector of the University of Munich (LMU Munich) 1941–1945]. NSDOKU München. Band 3 (in German). Herbert Utz Verlag. ISBN 978-3-8316-0676-4.
- Witzel, Michael (1997). "Obituary: Karl Hoffmann (1915–1996)". Indo-Iranian Journal. 40 (3): 245–253.
