= Hörbiger =

Hörbiger is a surname. Notable people with the surname include:

- Hanns Hörbiger (1860–1931), Austrian engineer and pseudoscientist
  - Hans Robert Hörbiger (1885–1955), Austrian engineer and pseudoscientist
  - Attila Hörbiger (1896–1987), Austrian actor
    - Christiane Hörbiger (1938–2022), Austrian actress
  - Paul Hörbiger (1894–1981), Austrian actor
    - Thomas Hörbiger (1931–2011), German actor and lyricist
      - Mavie Hörbiger (born 1979), German-Austrian actress
  - Alfred Hörbiger (1891–1941), Austrian businessman and engineer
