= Rudolf Elmayer von Vestenbrugg =

Rudolf Elmayer von Vestenbrugg (Pula 1881 - Graz 1970), also known als Elmar Brugg, Rudolf Elmar von Vinibert or Elmar Vinibert von Rudolph, was a technical engineer and a prolific Nazi-writer from Austria, who published several popular surveys on the work of cosmologist Hanns Hörbiger and his now-defunct Cosmic Ice (Glacial Cosmogony) Theory, as well as a range of popular antisemitic and National Socialist books, including a biography of the antisemitic politician Georg Ritter von Schönerer.

Up to 1938 Elmayer lived in Graz, where he later returned. During the War he was a SA-lieutenant colonel (Obersturmführer) and a military trainer, stationed in Slovenia. After 1945 he wrote on several other subjects, but he stayed true to his former political beliefs. He published a national-socialist novel and a 1958 dissertation on the Beowulf as a Germanic text.

His last book Eingriffe aus den Kosmos (Interventions from Outer Space) was published posthumously in 1971 by Hans Schindler Bellamy.
