= Hans Robert Hörbiger =

Austrian engineer and pseudoscientist (1885-1955)

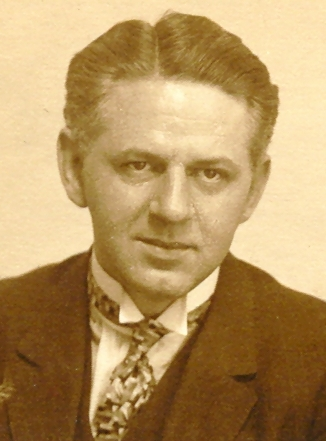
- Hörbiger in 1927
- Born: Johann Robert Hörbiger; 29 May 1885; Vienna, Austro-Hungary
- Died: 31 January 1955 (aged 69)
- Organization: Ahnenerbe
- Father: Hanns Hörbiger
- Family: Attila and Paul Hörbiger (brothers)

Johann Robert Hörbiger (1885–1955), commonly known as Hans Robert Hörbiger, was an Austrian engineer and proponent of the Welteislehre, a pseudoscientific theory which asserted that the base material of the universe was ice. Initially studying engineering and running a business with his father and brother, Hörbiger later worked to promote the theory; he worked under Heinrich Himmler in the Ahnenerbe, where the theory was used to generate weather forecasts.

== Life ==
=== Career ===
Born eldest son of scientist Hanns Hörbiger, in 1885 in Vienna, he was the eldest brother of the actors Paul and Attila Hörbiger. From 1891 to 1903, the Hörbiger lived in Budapest, where Hanns designed the Metro system. He was the director of exposition at Hoerbiger & Co., which he co-founded in 1925 with his father and younger brother, Alfred Alfred and Hans Robert later took over the business as Hanns developed the Welteislehrer theory; it would later be entirely run by Alfred. He studied mechanical engineering with Alfred, and designed a structure for scientific revolutions, which he developed based on his knowledge of mathematics and historiography.

In 1919, Hörbiger co-edited a book about the Welteislehre entitled Foundations of Cosmotechnics (Grundlagen der Kosmotechnik) with Max Valier, who was highly valued by Hanns. After his father's death in 1931, Hörbiger continued to work in the field of natural science, with his work especially concerning the Welteislehre. He was a member of the Hoerbiger-Institute. When Himmler created a department of the Ahnenerbe, the Nazis' pseudoscientific think tank, dedicated to meteorology, it held that the Welteislehre could be used to reliably create weather forecasts. This organisation was to be led by a "spiritual leader" ("geistige Leiter"), who would be reporting only to Himmler. Despite rumours that Hörbiger was a freemason and Catholic, he was appointed to this position by Himmler in 1936; Hörbiger was one of a number favoured by Himmler who were promoted to high positions. Originally, Himmler intended Hörbiger to be director, with Hans Robert Scultetus as his deputy, although by its creation on 1 January 1937, Sculteus was in charge, with Hörbiger as second-in-command. In 1938, he was fired and returned to Vienna in 1938 on account of incompetence and lack of expertise.

=== Occidental ===
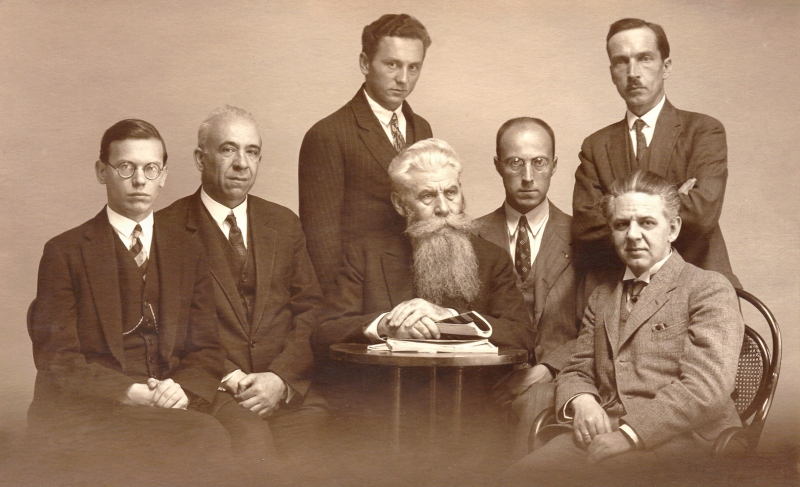
A meeting of the Occidental-Union in 1928; Hörbiger is sitting to the far-right.

Hörbiger was a supporter of the international auxiliary language Occidental by Edgar de Wahl, alongside his father Hanns, and likely his brother, Alfred. (Note: Alfred is listed as having donated financially to the Cosmoglotta Association in 1927; he designed the cover art of the magazine in January 1929.) Hörbiger had been mentioned as an Occidentalist as early as a 1927 edition of Cosmoglotta; In 1929 and in 1937, he was honorary president of the Occidental-Union. He wrote several books in and about the language, including as Occidental: The Way to the European Auxiliary Language (Occidental: Der Weg zur europäischen Verständigungssprache) in 1928.

== List of works ==
- Kispapa mesèl, 1916
- Occidental: Der Weg zur europäischen Verständigungssprache, la voja al la lingvo de l'Europa interkomprenigho, li via al lingue del europan intercomprension (con Engelbert Pigal), 1926
- Auf Sternenpfaden zum Himmelslicht : Wegweiser zu e. ethischen Weltbild, 1928
- Der Weg zum einheitlichen deutschen Weltbild, 1933
- Quo Occidental presenta al german ingeniero?, 1936
- Welteis, Roman um ein Weltbild (con Maximiliane Soeser), 1951
