= Tesla Model X =

Electric mid-size luxury crossover SUV since 2015

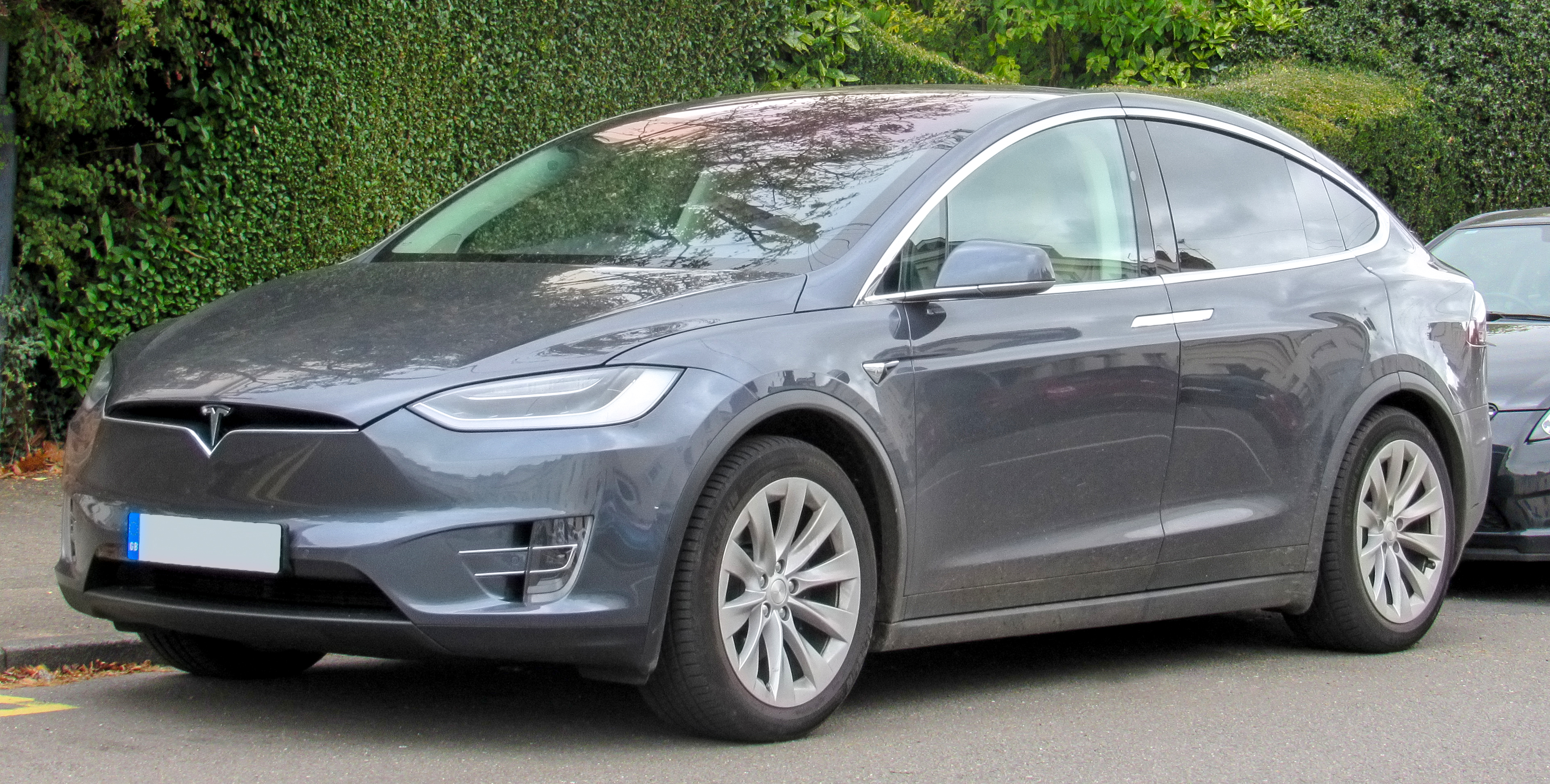

Overview
- Manufacturer: Tesla, Inc.
- Production: 2015 – May 2026
- Assembly: United States: Fremont, California (Fremont Factory); Netherlands: Tilburg (Tilburg final assembly, 2016–2021)
- Designer: Franz von Holzhausen

Body and chassis
- Class: Mid-size luxury crossover SUV (E)
- Body style: 5-door SUV
- Layout: Dual-motor, all-wheel-drive; Tri-motor, all-wheel-drive (Plaid)
- Doors: Conventional doors (front); Falcon-wing doors (rear)
- Related: Tesla Model S

Powertrain
- Electric motor: 670 hp (500 kW) (Long Range); 1,020 hp (760 kW) (Plaid); Discontinued previously: 60D, 75D, 90D, 100D: 259 hp (193 kW) front and rear; P90D, P100D: 259 hp (193 kW) front, 503 hp (375 kW) rear
- Transmission: Single-speed transaxle gearboxes; 60D, 75D, 90D, 100D: 9.34:1 front, 9.34:1 rear; P90D, P100D: 9.34:1 front, 9.73:1 rear
- Battery: 100 kWh lithium ion; Discontinued previously: 60, 75 and 90 kWh
- Electric range: 335–352 mi (539–566 km) (EPA) Discontinued previously: 75D: 238 mi (383 km) (EPA); 90D: 257 mi (414 km) (EPA); 100D: 325 mi (523 km) (EPA); P90D: 250 mi (400 km) (EPA); P100D: 305 mi (491 km) (EPA)

Dimensions
- Wheelbase: 116.7 in (2,965 mm)
- Length: 198.3 in (5,036 mm)
- Width: 78.7 in (1,999 mm)
- Height: 66.3 in (1,684 mm)
- Curb weight: 5,148 lb (2,335 kg); Plaid: 5,248 lb (2,380 kg); Discontinued previously: 60D: 5,072 lb (2,301 kg); 75D: 5,140 lb (2,330 kg); 90D: 5,271 lb (2,391 kg); P90D: 5,381 lb (2,441 kg); 100D: 5,421 lb (2,459 kg); P100D: 5,531 lb (2,509 kg)

Chronology
- Successor: Tesla Model Y L

The Tesla Model X is a battery electric mid-size luxury crossover SUV built by Tesla, Inc. from 2015 to 2026. Developed from the full-sized sedan platform of the Tesla Model S, the vehicle uses distinctive falcon wing doors for rear passenger access. In January 2026, Tesla announced that the Model X would be discontinued alongside the Model S.

The Model X has an EPA size class as an SUV, and shares around 30 percent of its content with the Model S, half of the originally planned 60 percent, and weighs about 10 percent more. Both the Model X and Model S are produced at the Tesla Factory in Fremont, California. The prototype was unveiled at Tesla's design studios in Hawthorne, California, on February 9, 2012. First deliveries of the Model X began in September 2015. After one full year on the market, in 2016, the Model X ranked seventh among the world's best-selling plug-in cars. A refresh of the Tesla Model X was introduced in 2021, offering a new "Plaid" performance model, along with a revised interior, powertrain, and suspension. Another update of the Model X was introduced in June 2025 with a new front bumper camera, new wheel designs, increased third-row space, dynamic ambient lighting, and adaptive headlights. The updates are similar to the Model S, which was updated at the same time.

As of July 2025, the Model X is available as a Long-Range version with an estimated EPA range of 352 miles (566 km) and a high performance "Plaid" version with an estimated EPA range of 335 miles (539 km).

== History ==
Tesla unveiled the Model X prototype at Tesla's design studios in Hawthorne, California on February 9, 2012, as a preview of an all electric SUV taking reservations without announcing a price.

Initially, Tesla planned for deliveries to commence in early 2014. However, in February 2013, the company announced that deliveries had been rescheduled to begin by late 2014 in order to achieve its production target of 20,000 Model S cars in 2013. In November 2013, Tesla said it expected to begin Model X high volume production the second quarter of 2015. In November 2014, Tesla again delayed and announced that Model X deliveries would begin in the third quarter of 2015. Deliveries began on September 29, 2015. Among the reasons for delay were problems with the falcon-wing doors and cooling the motors when hauling trailers.

In 2016, the company filed a lawsuit against Swiss hydraulics firm Hoerbiger Holding for not producing satisfactory falcon-wing doors for the Model X. Tesla claimed the doors suffered from oil leakage and overheating. Many believe this is one of the reasons for the delay of the Model X. The lawsuit was settled in September 2016.

On July 13, 2016, Tesla introduced its Model X 60D, which is slightly lower priced than the Model X's starting price. The Model X 60D has a 200 mi (320 km) range and can accelerate from 0 to 60 mph (0 to 97 km/h) in 6 seconds, with a top speed of 130 mph (210 km/h). The battery capacity in the Model X 60D is 75 kWh but has been software restricted to 60 kWh. Post purchase, owners have the option to unlock the additional 15 kWh, bringing the 60D to 75D range specifications.

Global sales passed the 10,000 unit mark in August 2016, with most cars delivered in the United States. In August 2016, Tesla introduced the P100D with Ludicrous Mode to be the new top Model X. The P100D has a 100 kWh battery, accelerate from 0 to 60 mph (0 to 97 km/h) in 2.9 seconds (0 to 100 km/h (0 to 62 mph) in 3.1 seconds) and 289 mi (465 km) of range. In October 2016 Tesla discontinued the 60D version and made the "Smart Air Suspension" standard instead of coil springs, increasing the base price to $85,000. In June 2017, the 90D version was discontinued.

In August 2017, Tesla announced that HW2.5 included a secondary processor node to provide more computing power and additional wiring redundancy to slightly improve reliability; it also enabled dashcam and sentry mode capabilities.

In March 2018 it was announced that Tesla upgraded the MCU to version 2. MCU 2 improved the performance of the 17 inch center console screen.

Global cumulative sales since inception totaled 106,689 units through September 2018.

In January 2019, Tesla discontinued the 75D version, making the 100D the base version of the Model X. The base price of the Model X 100D is $97,000 (~$120,322 in 2025) as of Jan 2019. In July 2019, Tesla added a Long Range model of the Model X with a 325-mile EPA range priced at $84,500 (~$104,816 in 2025).

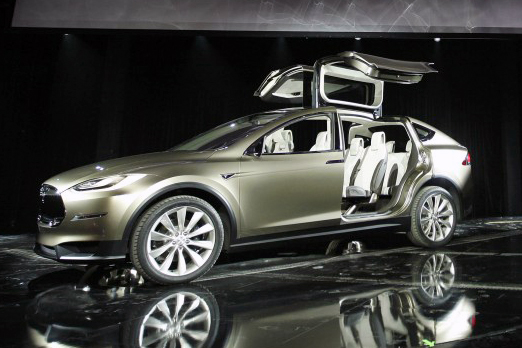
Tesla Model X concept in Tesla design studio in Hawthorne, California, February 9, 2012

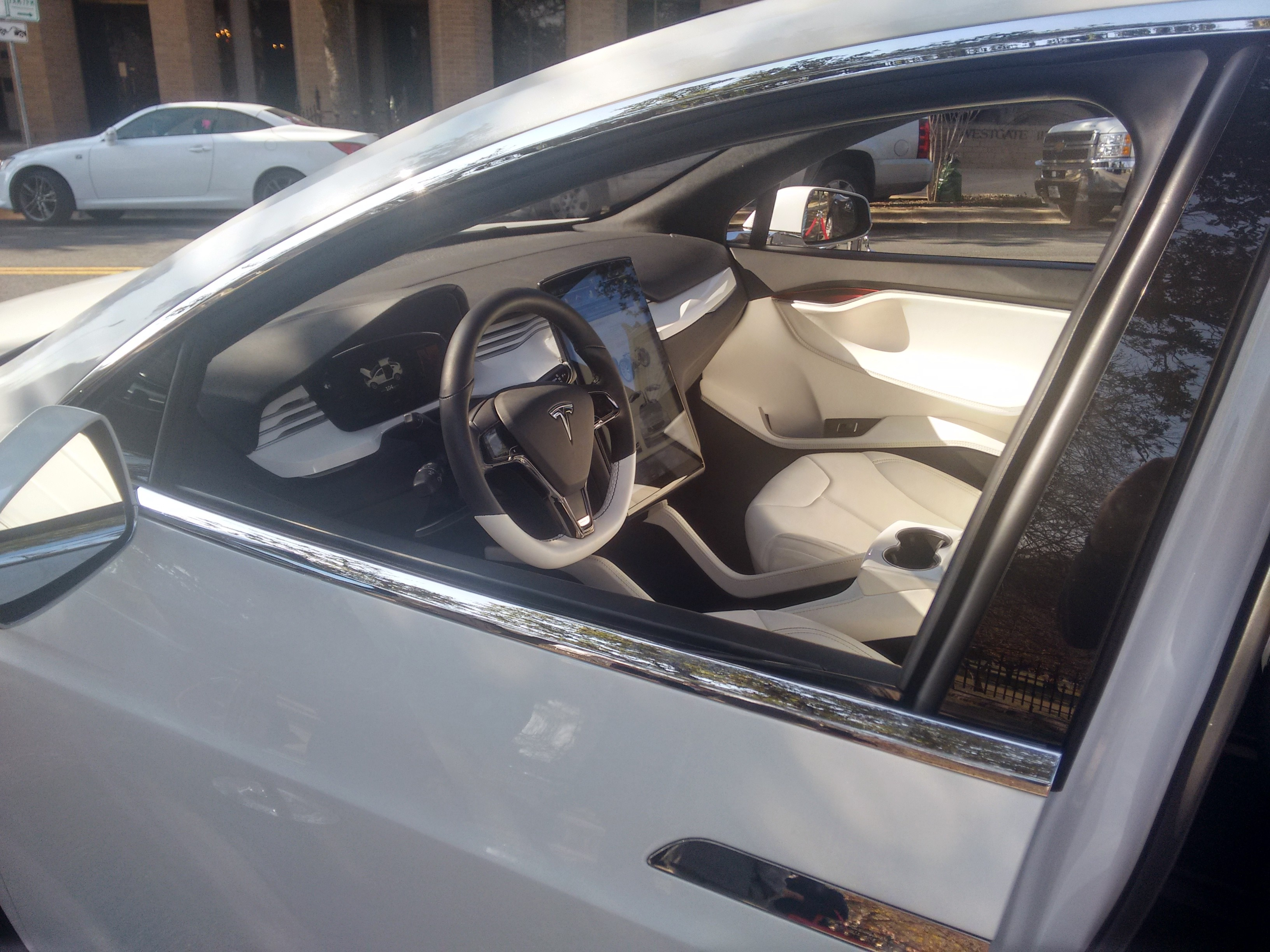
Early prototype Tesla Model X steering wheel with main dashboard 12.3-inch (31 cm) digital display (left) and central 17-inch (43 cm) touchscreen control panel (right)

In an engineering refresh in May 2019, range was increased to 325 mi (523 km) and smart air suspension was added.

In February 2020 Tesla increased the range of the Model X to 351 mi (565 km) of range.

In October 2020 Tesla increased the range of the Long Range Plus to 371 mi (597 km), and the Performance increased to 341 mi (549 km).

In September 2023, Tesla heavily discounted the price of a base Long Range Model X In the United States to US$79,990, allowing it to fall under the US$80,000 MSRP cap for a federal tax rebate under Inflation Reduction Act.

In January 2026, Tesla announced that the Model X would be discontinued and its production line would be repurposed to manufacture Optimus robots. A final run of 100 units dubbed the "Signature Edition" was offered by invite-only for purchase to customers. In 2026, the Tesla Model X is the fastest selling used car in the US.

== Design ==
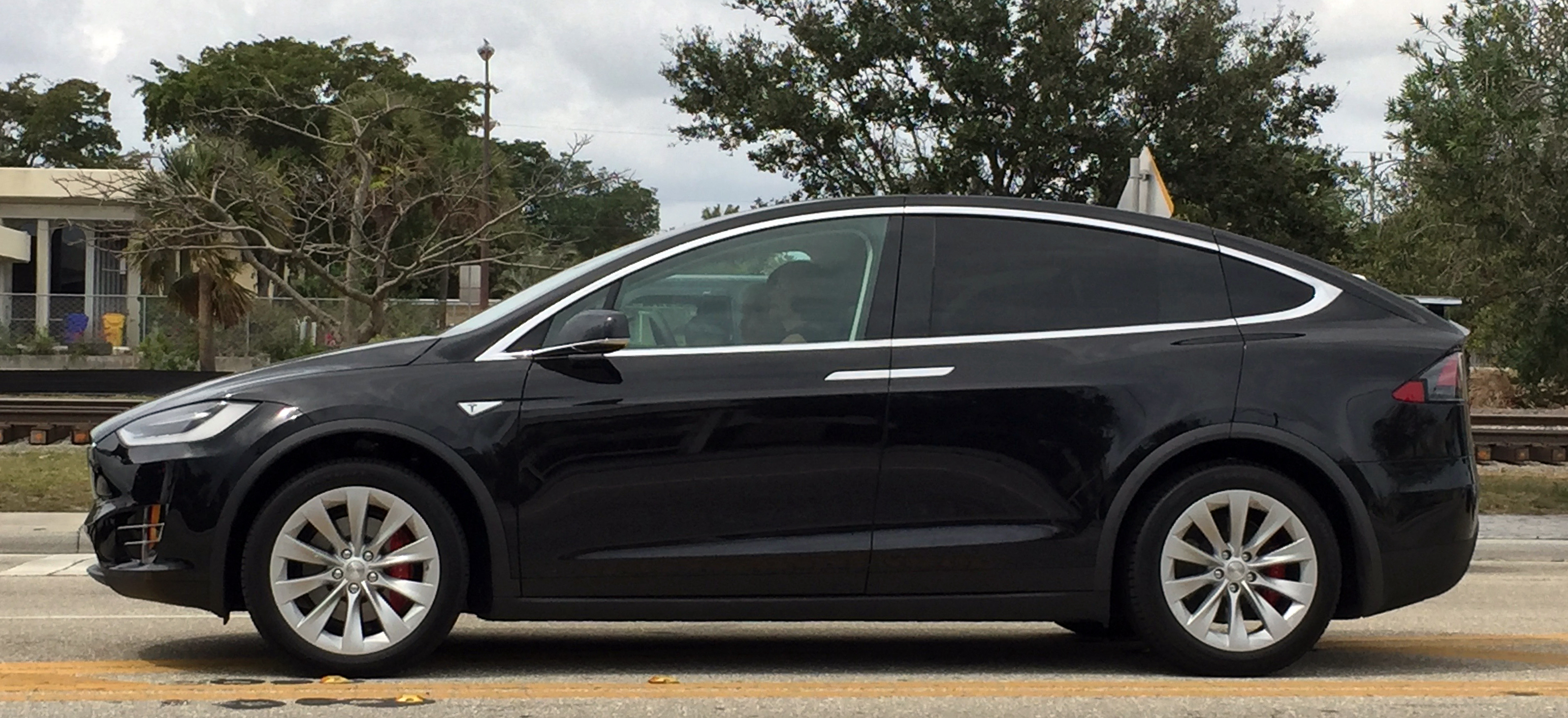
Side

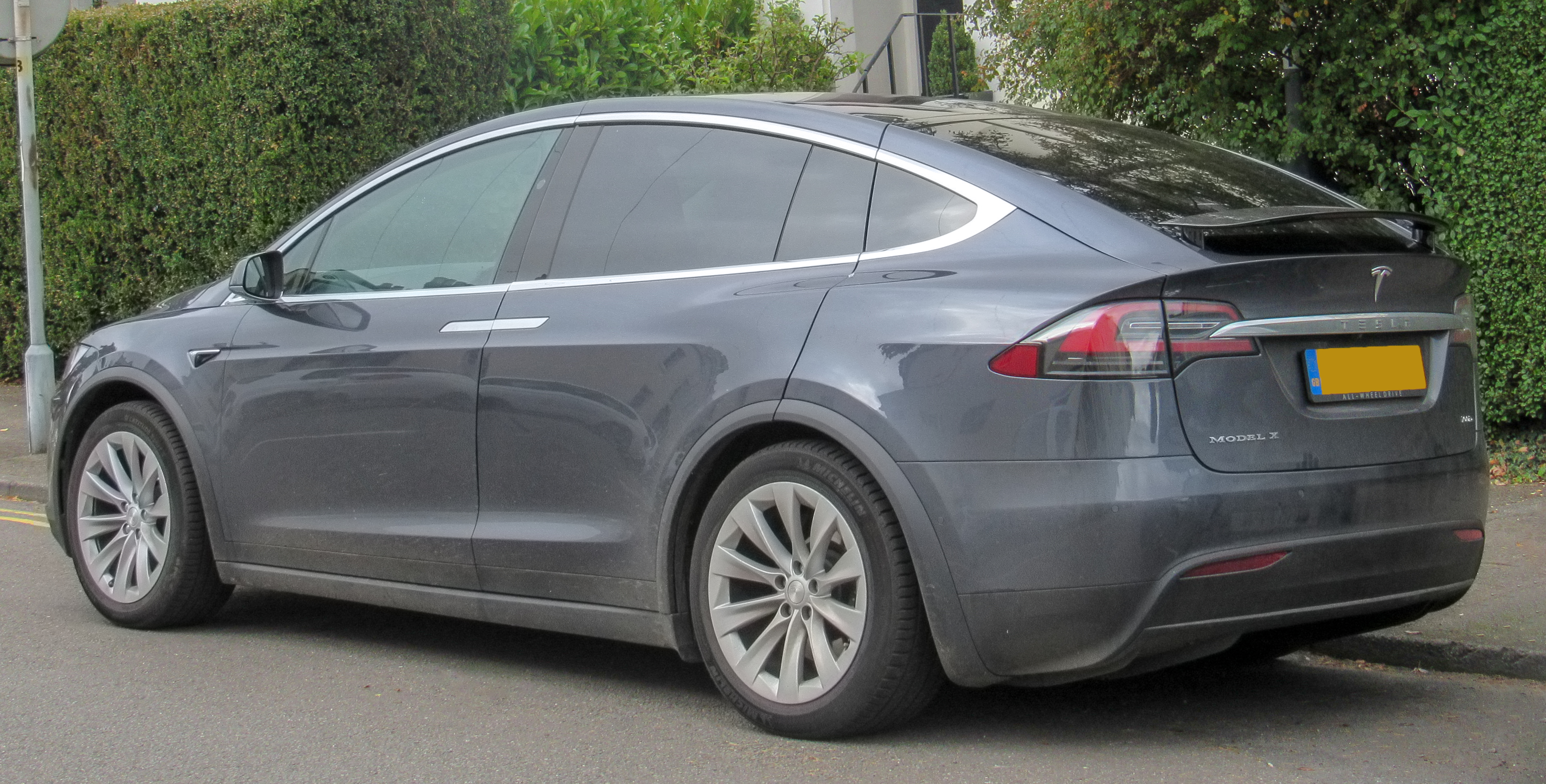
Rear

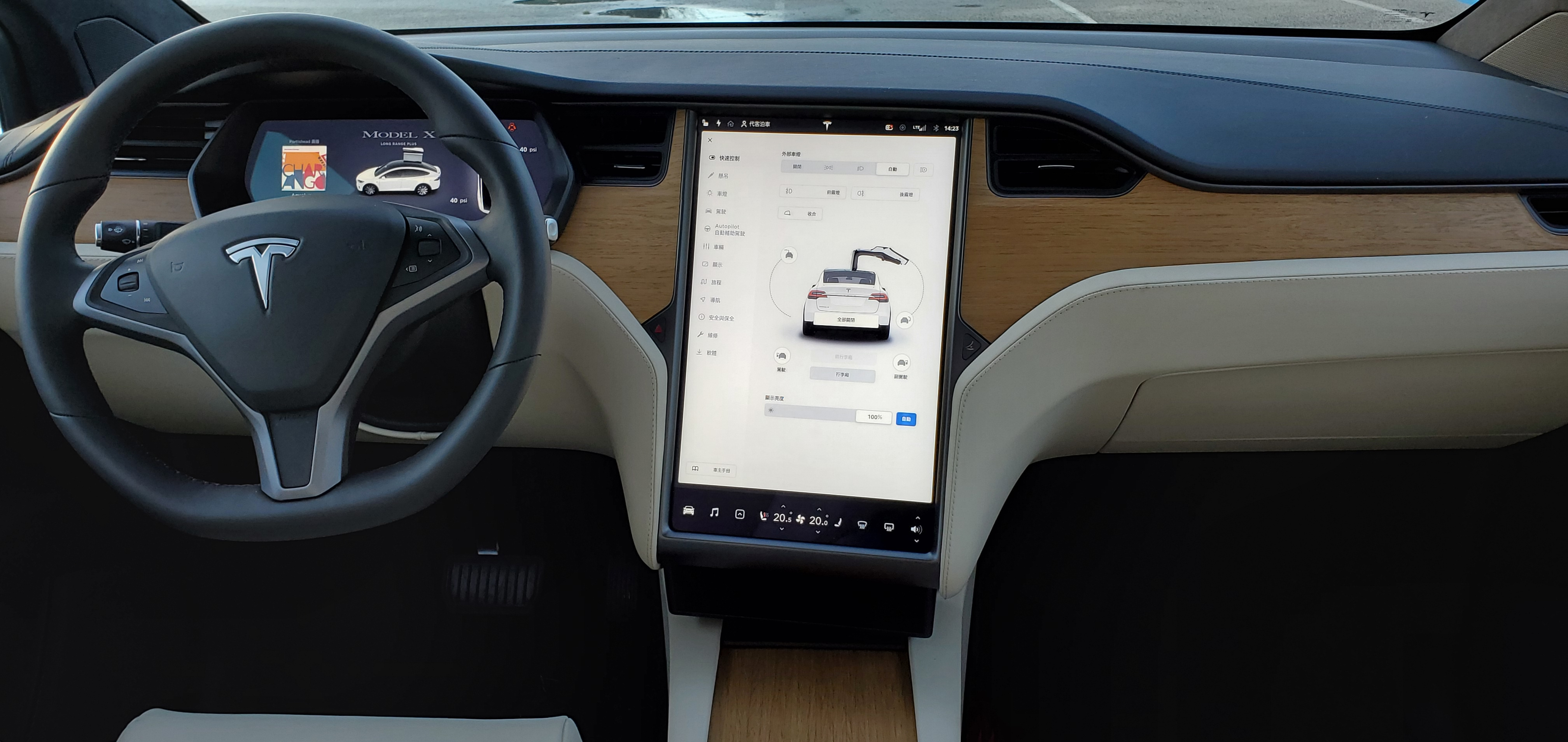
Interior

A series production vehicle was unveiled on September 29, 2015. It has a panoramic windshield. According to Tesla CEO Elon Musk, it is the safest SUV in terms of frontal and side impact crash, being more than twice as safe as the next closest SUV in rollover tests as well. The Model X does come with Autopilot as standard, and has an optional full self-driving system. The Model X has standard a collision avoidance system that uses radar-based autonomous emergency braking (AEB) and side-directed ultrasound detection that steers the car away from threats. Tesla uses a wide-band radar system to help prevent the falcon wing doors from hitting nearby objects when opening or closing.

The Model X has double-hinged falcon wing doors which open upwards, allowing the leading edge of the door to remain tucked close to the body, unlike traditional gull-wing doors. Tesla claims the falcon-wing (modified gull-wing) doors ease access to the vehicle by having the door raise up vertically, rather than swinging out hinged at the front, which tremendously reduces accessibility. The Model X offers room for seven adults and their luggage in three rows of seating and front and rear trunks.

== Specifications ==
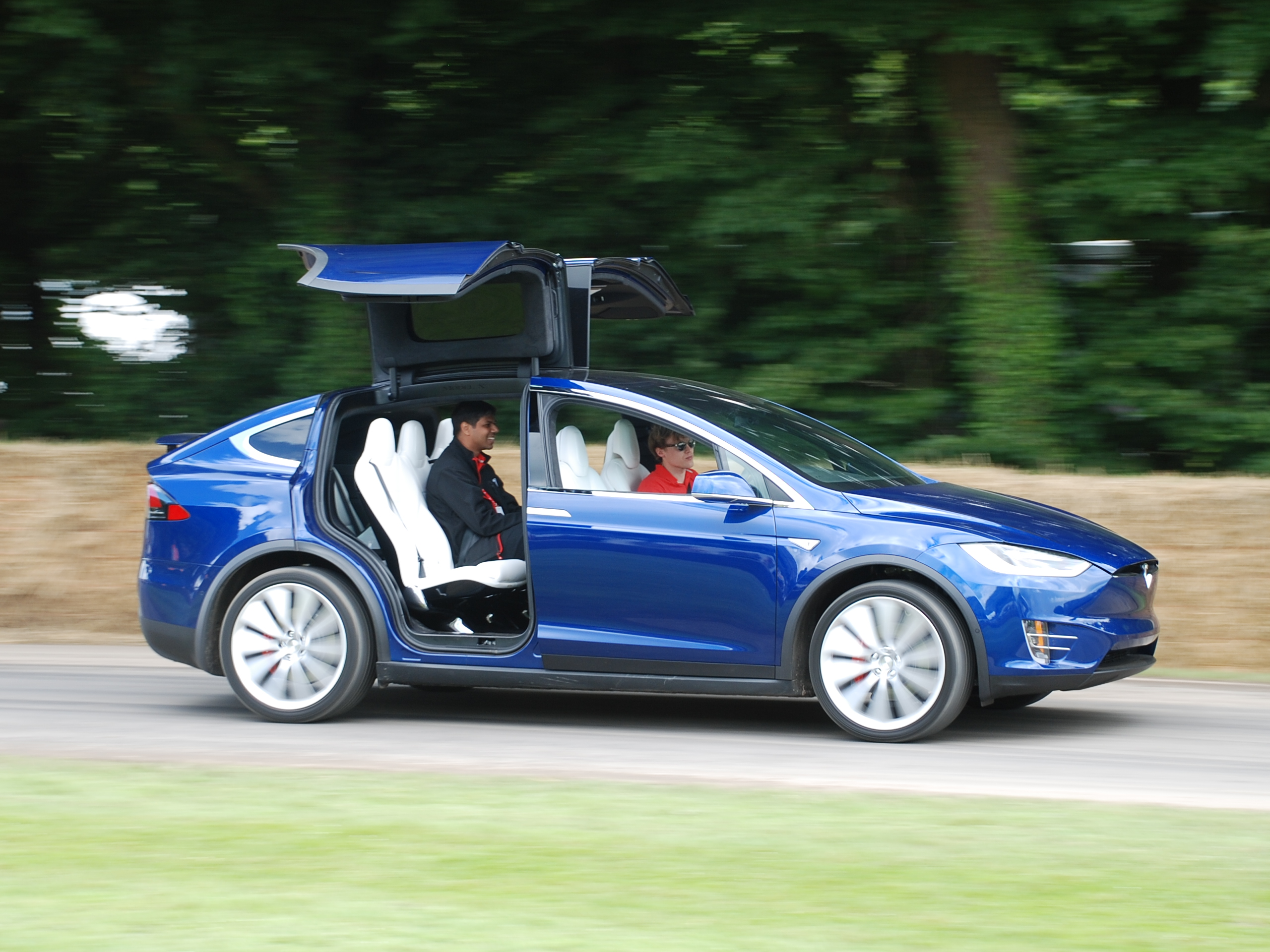
The Model X has double-hinged falcon wing doors.

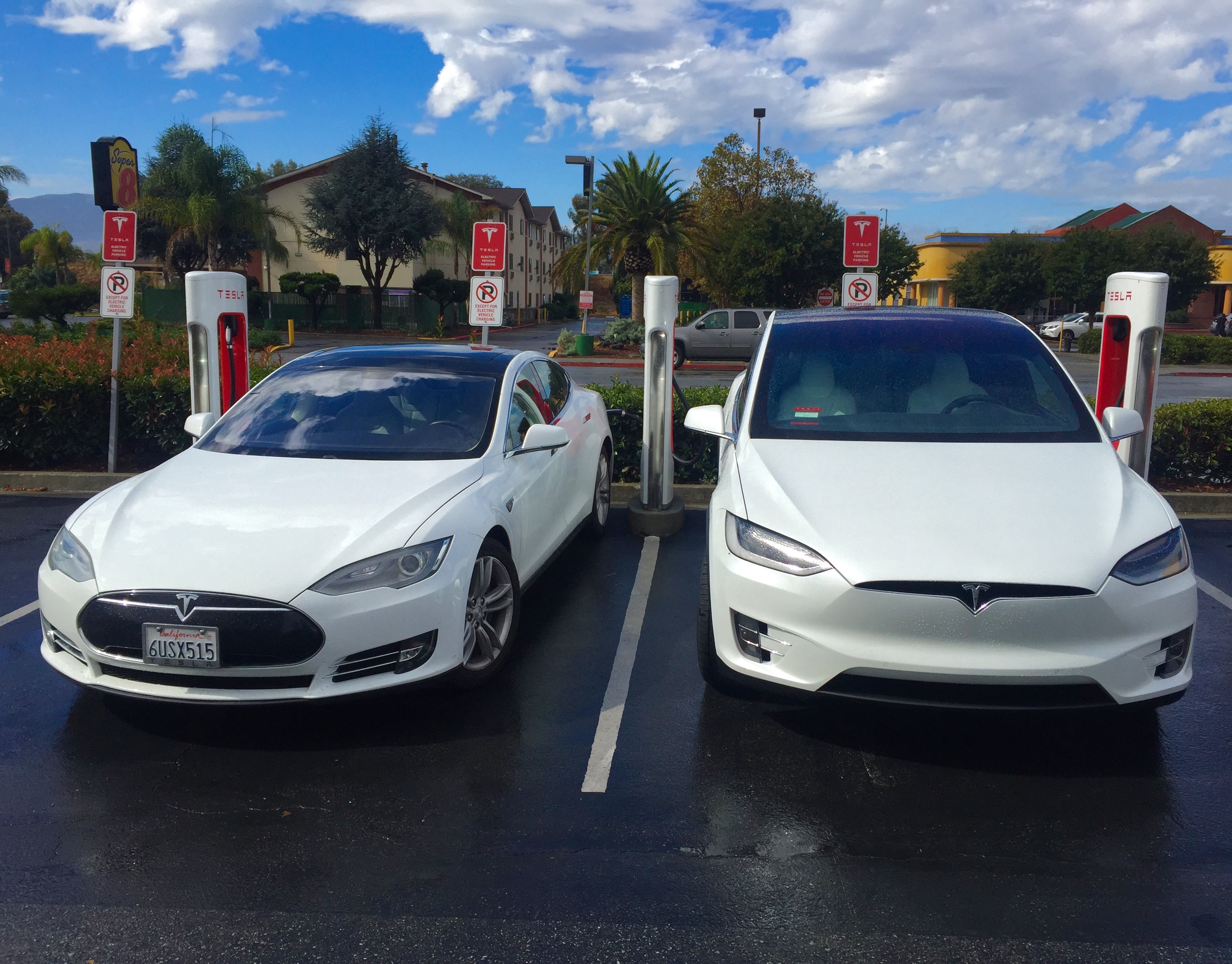
The Tesla Model S (left) and Model X (right) share the same platform and 30% of their parts.

The Model X weighs about 8% more than the Model S and shares about 30% of its parts content – down from around 60% expected when development began. The cargo space is 87.8 ft^{3} (2.5 m^{3}).

Over the years, the Model X has been available with four lithium-ion battery packs, rated at either 60, 75, 90, or 100 kW·h. The highest performance version, the Model X Plaid, goes from 0 to 60 mph (0 to 97 km/h) in 2.5 seconds and the 1/4 mile (400 meters) in 9.9 seconds, outperforming the fastest SUVs and most sports cars. The Model X's all-wheel-drive system uses two motors (one for the front and the other for the rear wheels), unlike conventional AWD systems that have a single source of power. The 2026 Tesla Model X AWD has an official EPA rated range of up to 352 mi (566 km).

The company planned to offer rear-wheel-drive models, but instead all models use all-wheel drive. The standard AWD has 259 horsepower (193 kilowatts) on both the front and rear motors, while the performance edition has 259 hp (193 kW) front and 503 hp (375 kW) rear. With an optional towbar, the Model X has a towing capacity of up to 5000 lb or 2250 kg. At the 55 mph (89 km/h) towing speed limit in California, a Model X may have 70% of the 257 mi (414 km) EPA-registered range when pulling a 2,300 lb (1,000 kg) travel trailer.

=== Energy consumption ===
The following table shows the EPA's official ratings for fuel economy in miles per gallon gasoline equivalent (MPGe) for the variants of the Model X rated as of 2024 and as displayed in the Monroney label.

2024 Tesla Model X fuel economy and operating costs
Model	Model year	Fuel efficiency (MPGe)		
Model	Model year	Combined	City	Highway
Dual Motor AWD (100 kWh)	2024	100; 34 kWh/100 mi or 21 kWh/100 km	104; 33 kWh/100 mi or 23 kWh/100 km	96; 35 kWh/100 mi or 22 kWh/100 km
Plaid (100 kWh)	2024	98; 35 kWh/100 mi or 21 kWh/100 km	102; 33 kWh/100 mi or 21 kWh/100 km	92; 36 kWh/100 mi or 22 kWh/100 km

== Production and sales ==
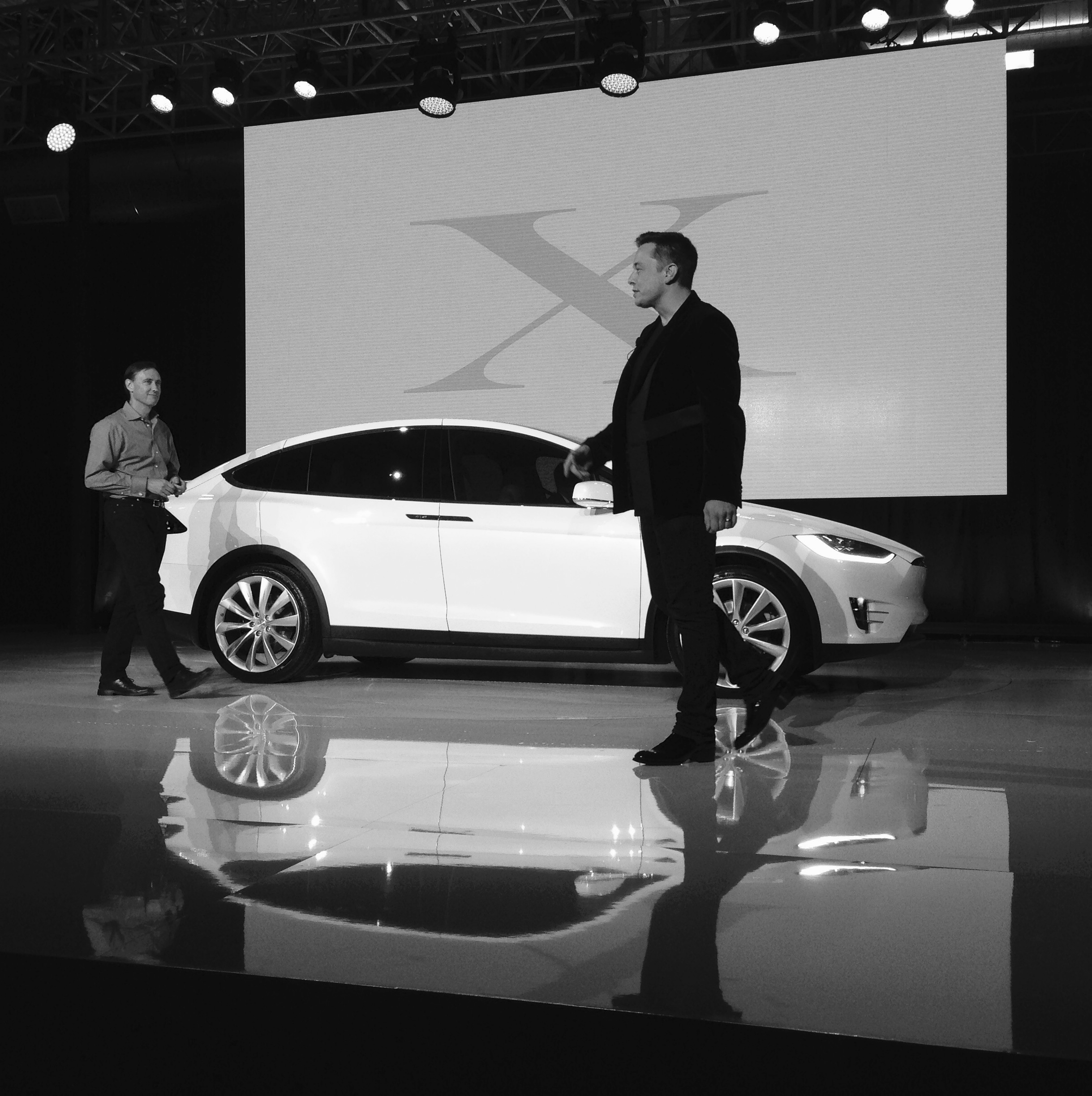
Elon Musk delivering one of the first six Model X (VIN 0002) Founders Series models to Tesla board member Steve Jurvetson

Tesla started taking reservations for the Model X in February 2012 without announcing prices. The standard Model X required a US$5,000 deposit, while the limited time production Signature model required a US$40,000 deposit in 2013. More than 20,000 Model Xs had been reserved by September 2014. In August 2015, user groups estimated around 30,000 Model X pre-orders had been received, compared to 12,000 for the Model S.

The first six Founders Series models were delivered at a market launch event in the Fremont factory on September 29, 2015. The first Signature edition was delivered on December 18, 2015. Pricing for the limited edition Signature version of the Model X varies between US$132,000 and US$144,000, while the standard production version of the Model X will be priced at US$5,000 more than a comparably equipped AWD Model S that is priced at US$75,000 for the base Model 70D.

After the first quarter of 2016 all Tesla Model X deliveries had gone to US customers. Nevertheless, in January 2016 a Tesla car other than the Model S was registered in Germany and a Tesla Model X was sighted driving there with a license plate from Ingolstadt. Since the Audi headquarters are located in Ingolstadt, this led to speculation that Audi has acquired a Model X as part of its effort to develop its own battery electric SUV.

Tesla produced 507 Model X in the fourth quarter of 2015, of which 206 were delivered to customers. Model X sales totaled 2,400 units during the first quarter of 2016. According to Tesla Motors, deliveries were lower than expected because production was impacted by severe Model X supplier parts shortages in the first two months of 2016, and because Tesla had been too ambitious in wanting advanced features (committed "hubris"). The first Model X that did not need corrections was made in April 2016.

Sales during the second quarter of 2016 totaled 4,638 units. Although production was up 20% from the previous quarter, the number of vehicles in transit at the end of June 2016 was much higher than expected (5,150 including Model S cars), representing 35.8% of the number of cars delivered in the quarter (14,402 vehicles including the Model S). Global sales passed the 10,000 unit mark in August 2016. A total of 8,774 units were delivered in the third quarter of 2016, totaling 15,812 Model X cars sold during the first nine months of 2016.

The Model X ranked as the top-selling plug-in electric car in Norway in September 2016. However, when Volkswagen Golf nameplate registrations are broken down by each variant's powertrain, the all-electric e-Golf registered 392 units, the Golf GTE plug-in hybrid 358, and the internal combustion-powered Golf only 242 units. Therefore, the Model X also ranked as the top-selling new car model in September 2016. Norway was the world's first country to have all-electric cars topping the new car sales monthly ranking. Previously, the Model S had been the top-selling new car four times, and the Nissan Leaf twice.

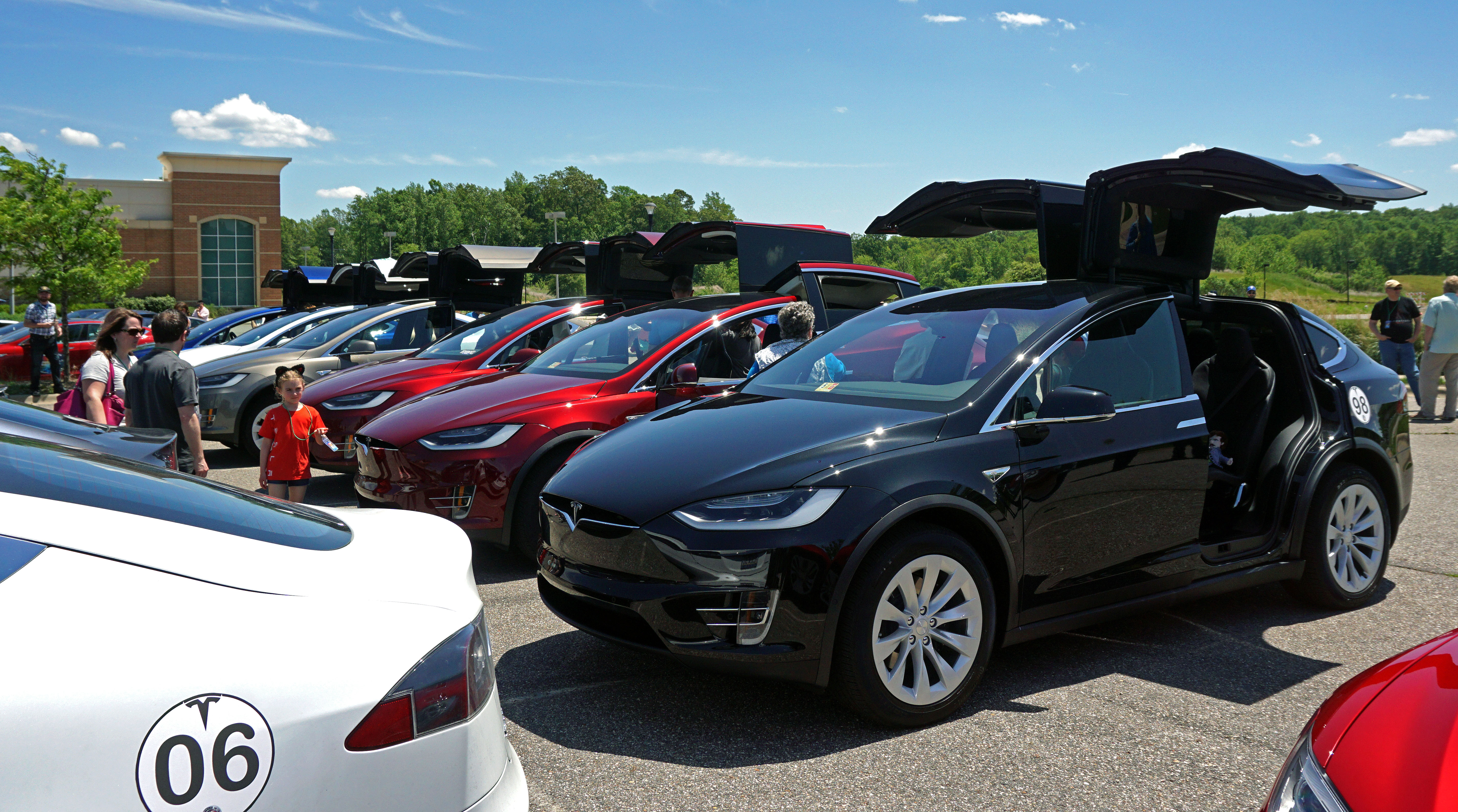
Multiple Model X cars parked

According to Tesla, with 5,428 units sold in the U.S. in the third quarter of 2016, the Model X captured a 6% market share of the luxury SUV market segment, outselling Porsche and Land Rover, but behind seven SUV models manufactured by Mercedes-Benz, BMW, Cadillac, Volvo, Audi, and Lexus. With an estimated 9,500 units delivered worldwide during the fourth quarter of 2016, global sales in 2016 totaled 25,312 Model X cars, allowing the Model X to rank seventh among the world's top ten best-selling plug-in cars just in its first full year in the market.

As of December 2016, cumulative sales totaled 25,524 units. The United States is its primary market with 18,240 units delivered through December 2016, of which, an estimated 18,028 Model X vehicles were delivered during 2016, making the electric SUV the third best-selling plug-in electric in the American market that year after the Tesla Model S and the Chevrolet Volt. Registrations in California totaled 6,289 units in 2016, representing a 7.0% market share of the state's luxury mid-size SUV segment, ranking as the fifth best-selling car in this class, which was led by the Lexus RX with 20,070 units. Retail deliveries in China began in June 2016, and a total of 4,065 Model X vehicles were sold in 2016.

Global sales totaled about 11,550 units during the first quarter of 2017. A severe production shortfall of 100 kWh battery packs limited the second quarter of 2017 global deliveries to just about 10,000 Model X vehicles, with a slight increase to 11,865 vehicles during the third quarter of 2017. An additional 13,120 units were delivered in the fourth quarter of 2017, for total annual deliveries of 46,535 units globally. As of December 2017, cumulative sales since inception totaled about 72,059 units. Global sales during the first nine months of 2018 totaled 34,630 units, allowing the Model X to pass the 100,000 milestone in September 2018, with 106,689 units delivered since inception.

On April 30, 2019, 5 Model X 75Ds were bought and operated by Blue Bird Group for their premium taxi service, Silver Bird, in Indonesia.

In the UK from 2021 to 2022, deliveries of Model X vehicles dropped significantly to almost zero. In 2023, Tesla also stated that the Model X will not be sold in the UK or Ireland in right-hand drive for the 'foreseeable future'.

As of April 1, 2026, the Model X configurator, as well as the Model S, were no longer able to be accessed, redirecting to Tesla's inventory page.

== Reception ==
Consumer Reports wrote that the all-wheel-drive Model X 90D largely disappoints, as rear doors are prone to pausing and stopping, the second-row seats cannot be folded, and the cargo capacity is too limited. Even its panoramic, helicopter-like windshield was disapproved, as it is not tinted enough to offset the brightness of a sunny day. Consumer Reports added that overall "the ride is too firm and choppy for a $110,000 car".

Car and Driver, despite some criticism of the Model X falcon wing doors, approved of the panoramic windshield, stating "We were left dumbfounded, like slack-jawed tourists endlessly looking upward. Lose the Falcon Wing doors, Elon; the windshield is the Model X's best gimmick". Overall, it was given a rating of 5/5 stars, stating "There are no other electric SUVs at the moment. And even against fossil-fuel-fed SUVs, the Tesla's effortless performance and efficiency can't be matched."

Motoring journalist Jeremy Clarkson's made his first review of a Tesla vehicle in 10 years, on his TV show The Grand Tour in February 2018; Clarkson gave a positive review of the car that he called "fabulous" that is unlike anything on the road. Lawyers were present during the review; Gizmodo posited that this was because Clarkson's previous scathing review of the original Roadster led to a lawsuit.

The 2016 Model X was named one of the top ten tech cars in 2016 by IEEE Spectrum.

== Awards ==
- On November 16, 2015, the Tesla Model X was chosen as AutoGuide.com's 2016 Reader's Choice Green Car of the Year and Luxury Utility Vehicle of the Year awards. The model was noted for its falcon-wing doors, long range, efficiency, and acceleration.
- On November 8, 2016, the Model X was awarded the Golden Steering Wheel (Das Goldene Lenkrad), one of the most prestigious automotive awards in the world, in the "Large SUV" category. Candidates for this award are nominated by hundreds of thousands across Europe for excellence across six categories. The Golden Steering Wheel jury, composed of professional race car drivers, accomplished technicians, editors, designers, and digital and connectivity experts, then spent three days judging Model X.
- On April 18, 2017, the American Automobile Association named the Tesla Model X 75D its Top Green Vehicle overall, as well as best in the SUV/Minivan category, with a score of 100/130. The vehicle scored 10/10 for its EPA Emissions Score, crashworthiness, Fuel Economy and Luggage Capacity. Though ambivalent toward Autopilot and the Model X's glass roof, AAA favoured its falcon-wing doors, and approved of the vehicle's performance, stating that its "acceleration is smooth and strong, as is the braking."
- On June 8, 2017, the Model X was awarded the Australian Good Design Award in the Automotive and Transport category. The design of the vehicle was described as "set with an athletic build, whilst remaining proportional. Delivering on the functional form of a cross between SUV and people mover, the design remains true to a sports SUV."
- On December 11, 2017, Forbes named the Model X 100D Best Vehicle of the Year stating that "Tesla makes every internal combustion vehicle on the highway seem a clunky, clumsy relic of the 20th century."

== Use by SpaceX ==
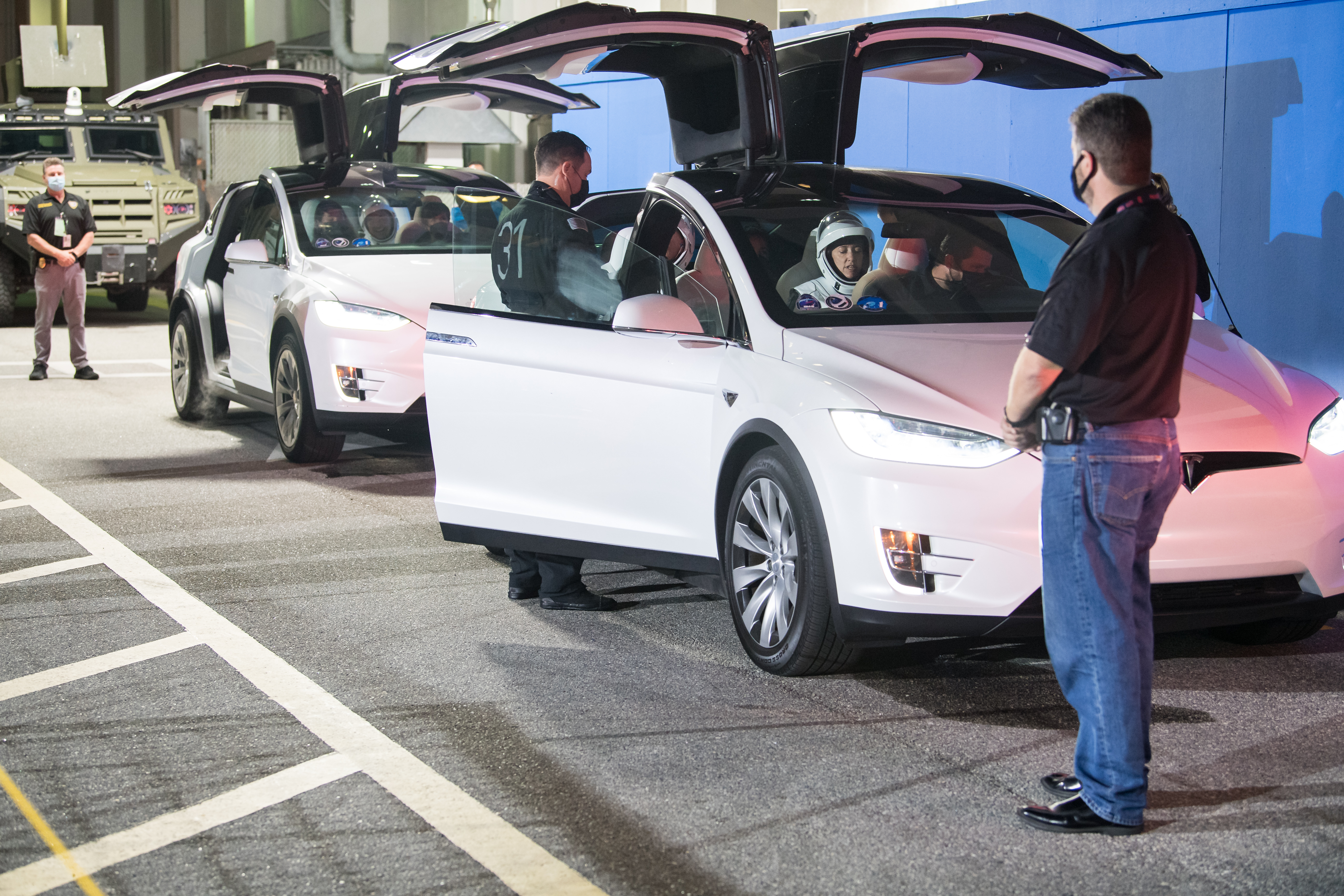
Tesla Model X for astronaut transportation from Operations and Checkout Building to Launch Complex 39A ahead of a Crew Dragon mission

Since 2020, SpaceX has used modified Tesla Model X SUVs (with umbilicals for the astronauts) to transport astronauts, especially for Commercial Crew Program missions for NASA. For every mission, the cars have vanity plates.

== Guinness World Record ==
On May 15, 2018, the Tesla Model X and Qantas set the Guinness World Record for "heaviest tow by an electric production passenger vehicle." The Model X was able to tow a 287,000 lb (130,000 kg) Boeing 787–9 nearly one thousand feet (300 metres) on a taxiway at Melbourne Airport.

== Issues with production units ==
The Tesla Model X faced criticism in 2016 for issues with the falcon-wing doors, which sometimes did not open or latch properly in some early production units, and the windows, which sometimes did not open or close all the way. Tesla addressed these issues with several software updates, and no known issues remained after the 8.0 firmware was released. On June 27, 2016, Tesla settled on a lawsuit over usability concerns, accepting that the Model X was rushed to production before it was ready, and by October 2016, Tesla claimed the problems had been reduced by 92%.

In 2017 Chinese newspaper Xinhua reported that security researchers from Keen Security Lab at Tencent were able to remotely gain control of the Tesla Model X, allowing them to remotely open the car's doors, blink the lights and control their brakes. They found zero day vulnerabilities that allowed them to install new firmware. The lead researcher for the team said they informed Tesla of the findings and most of the cars were patched by an update one month after Tesla was made aware of issues.

=== Recalls ===
As of April 2025, Tesla has had thirty-eight product safety recalls of the Model X:

- On April 11, 2016, 2,700 Model X vehicles were recalled due to the third-row seats unlatching during collision testing, folding over to the second row.
- On April 20, 2017, Tesla recalled 53,000 (~70%) of the 76,000 Model S and Model X vehicles it sold in 2016 due to faulty parking brakes.
- In October 2017, Tesla issued an 11,000 vehicle recall for a faulty locking cable mechanism in the second-row seats, estimating that about 3% of recalled vehicles may be affected.
- In February 2020, 15,000 vehicles Model X vehicles were recalled due to corrosion found on aluminum bolts that attach the electric power steering motor.
- In November 2020, approximately 9,100 Tesla vehicles, including the Model X, were recalled due to missing primer on the spine and front cosmetic roof trim. One or both trim pieces could detach unexpectedly.
- In January 2021, nearly 135,000 Tesla vehicles, including the Model X, were recalled over malfunctioning rearview cameras. When an affected vehicle's flash memory device reached lifetime wear, some center display functions could stop working.
- In October 2021, approximately 11,700 Tesla vehicles, including the Model X, were recalled due to the potential for the automatic emergency brake to activate unexpectedly, increasing the risk of a collision.
- In November 2021, approximately 7,600 Tesla vehicles, including the Model X, were recalled due to a potential defect with the driver's air bag cushion.
- In January 2022, approximately 54,000 Tesla vehicles, including the Model X, were recalled due to a flaw in the Full Self-Driving (Beta) software that allowed affected vehicles to not stop when directed to by a stop sign.
- In February 2022, approximately 817,000 Tesla vehicles, including the Model X, were recalled. Affected vehicles would not sound a warning chime if the driver started the vehicle without buckling their seat belt.
- In February 2022, approximately 26,700 Tesla vehicles, including the Model X, were recalled over an ineffective defrosting system.
- In February 2022, approximately 578,000 Tesla vehicles, including the Model X, were recalled over non-compliance with Federal Motor Vehicle Safety Standard number 141. The "Boombox" feature of these vehicles could obscure the Pedestrian Warning System (PWS) sounds.
- In March 2022, approximately 940 Tesla vehicles, including the Model X, were recalled. When affected vehicles were put into reverse, there could be a delay before the rearview image would display on the touchscreen.
- In April 2022, approximately 7,300 Model X vehicles were recalled due to potential improper deployment of the left and right side curtain air bags. When the vehicle's windows were lowered, the air bags could deploy incorrectly and increase the risk of injuries.
- In April 2022, approximately 595,000 Tesla vehicles, including the Model X, were recalled over non-compliance with Federal Motor Vehicle Safety Standard number 141. The "Boombox" feature of these vehicles could obscure the Pedestrian Warning System (PWS) sounds.
- In April 2022, a single Tesla Model X vehicle was recalled. The second-row seat was installed without a body structure reinforcement bracket. The single vehicle was replaced for its owner at no cost.
- In May 2022, approximately 130,000 Tesla vehicles, including the Model X, were recalled. The infotainment central processing unit (CPU) could overheat during a fast-charging cycle, causing the CPU to shut down or lag.
- In September 2022, approximately 1,097,000 Tesla vehicles, including the Model X, were recalled due to an issue with the window automatic reversal system.
- In November 2022, approximately 40,200 Tesla vehicles, including the Model X and Model S, were recalled. Affected vehicles could lose power steering assist after hitting a pothole or driving on a rough road.
- In November 2022, approximately 29,300 Model X vehicles were recalled over improper deployment of the front-passenger air bag during a low-speed collision.
- In February 2023, approximately 363,000 Tesla vehicles, including the Model X, were recalled for issues with the Full Self-Driving Beta (FSD Beta) software.
- In April 2023, approximately 38 Model X vehicles were recalled. Weak camera signal strength could cause issues with the display of the rearview image.
- In July 2023, approximately 15,900 Tesla vehicles, including the Model X and Model S, were recalled. The seat belts could detach from the pretensioner anchor.
- In July 2023, approximately 1,300 Tesla vehicles, including the Model X, were recalled due to a potentially misaligned forward-facing camera. The incorrect camera angle could negatively affect the performance of emergency braking, forward collision warning, and lane assist features.
- In October 2023, approximately 54,700 Tesla vehicles, including the Model X, were recalled. When affected vehicles had low brake fluid, the associated warning light would not display correctly.
- In November 2023, approximately 160 Tesla vehicles, including the Model X and Model S, were recalled. An incorrect air bag may have been installed in affected vehicles.
- In December 2023, approximately 2,031,000 Tesla vehicles, including the Model X, were recalled due to Autosteer problems.
- In January 2024, approximately 2,194,000 Tesla vehicles, including the Model X, were recalled due to an incorrect font size on the instrument panel.
- In February 2024, approximately 6,600 Tesla vehicles, including the Model X, were recalled because the PWS sounds were inadvertently muted by a factory reset.
- In May 2024, approximately 125,000 Tesla vehicles, including the Model X, were recalled because warning chimes did not sound when the driver was unbelted.
- In July 2024, approximately 1,850,000 Tesla vehicles, including the Model X, were recalled because the vehicle's software did not properly detect an unlatched hood. The unsecured hood could fly up while the vehicle was in motion, obscuring the driver's vision.
- In August 2024, approximately 9,100 Model X vehicles were recalled because the roof trim could fly off due to missing primer.
- In December 2024, approximately 25 Model X vehicles were recalled due to flickering low beam headlights and parking lights.
- In December 2024, approximately 294 Tesla vehicles, including the Model X and Model S, were recalled due to a defective driver's air bag.
- In January 2025, approximately 239,400 Tesla vehicles, including the Model X, were recalled because the rearview camera could fail.
- In March 2025, approximately 91 Tesla vehicles, including the Model X and Model S, were recalled. Affected vehicles may have had the wrong horn pad installed, preventing the horn from sounding.

== Safety ==
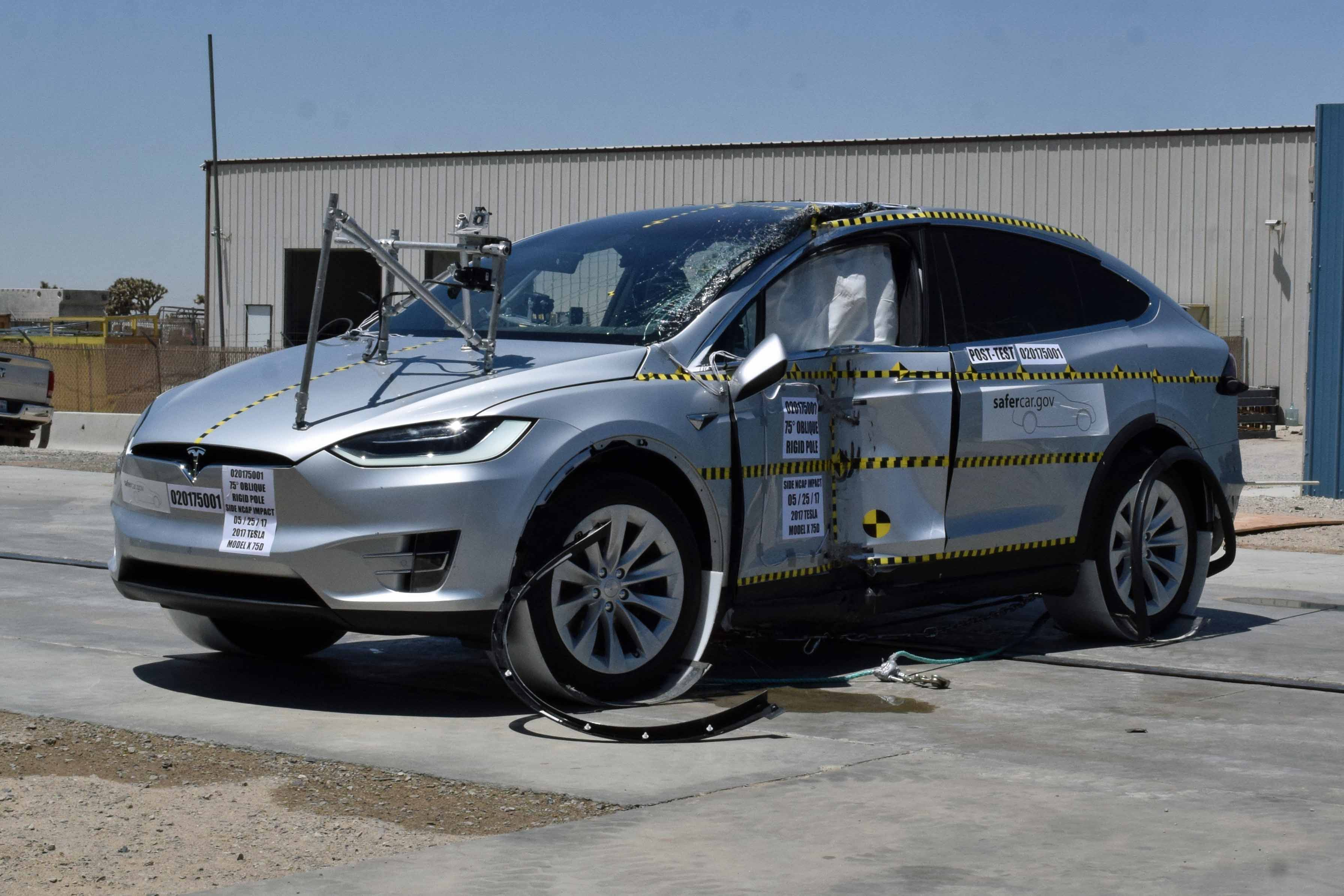
NHTSA side pole crash test of the 2017 Tesla Model X

NHTSA test videos 2017
- Frontal crash on YouTube
- Side crash on YouTube
- Pole crash on YouTube

=== ANCAP ===
ANCAP test results* Tesla Model X (2019, aligned with Euro NCAP)
Test	Points	%
Overall:	5 /5 stars	
Adult occupant:	37.4	98%
Child occupant:	42.2	86%
Pedestrian:	35	72%
Safety assist:	12.3	94%

=== NHTSA ===
On June 13, 2017, the National Highway Traffic Safety Administration announced its crash testing results for the 2017-manufactured Tesla Model X, revealing 5-star ratings in all assessed categories, the only SUV to have done so. Tesla attributed the ratings to safety-focused design, in addition to a low centre-of-gravity resulting from its battery pack, adding "More than just resulting in a 5-star rating, the data from NHTSA's testing shows that Model X has the lowest probability of injury of any SUV it has ever tested. In fact, of all the cars NHTSA has ever tested, Model X's overall probability of injury was second only to Model S."

NHTSA 2017
Overall	5/5 stars
Frontal, driver	5/5 stars
Frontal, passenger	5/5 stars
Side, driver	5/5 stars
Side, passenger	5/5 stars
Side pole, driver	5/5 stars
Rollover	/ 9.3%

=== Euro NCAP ===
The Model X has been tested and received five stars from Euro NCAP.

Euro NCAP test results* Tesla Model X (2019)
Test	Points	%
Overall:	5 /5 stars	
Adult occupant:	37.5	98%
Child occupant:	39.9	81%
Pedestrian:	35	72%
Safety assist:	12.3	94%

== See also ==
- Electric car use by country
- Government incentives for plug-in electric vehicles
- List of production battery electric vehicles
- List of Easter eggs in Tesla products
- Tesla Supercharger
