= Hans Schindler Bellamy =

Austrian English professor, author and pseudoarchaeologist

Hans Schindler (19 March 1901 – Vienna, 12 December 1982), author names H.S. Bellamy and Hans Schindler Bellamy, was an English professor in Vienna and an author on pseudoarchaeology. His books investigate the work of Austrian engineer Hanns Hörbiger and German selenographer Philipp Fauth and the now-defunct Cosmic Ice (Glacial Cosmogony) Theory.

Hans Schindler was an English teacher at the Folk High School in the Vienna district of Margareten. Between 1930 and 1938 he published several English textbook as well as two booklet on English folksongs and on the history of the English language. As Jews and social-democrats he and his wife Rosie were fierce opponents of the Nazi-party. After the Anschluss of 1938 both fled to Britain, where he became a BBC-surveillor of German radio broadcasts. In 1946 he returned to Vienna and continued his work for the Folk High Schools. He died in 1982 and was buried in Kfar Menahem (Israel), where his son lived; his wife then also settled in Israel, where she died in 2015 at the age of 102.

In 1936 his first book on the Cosmic Ice Theory (Moons, Myths and Man) was published under the pen-name H.S. Bellamy by the London Publisher Faber & Faber Ltd. The book describes Hörbiger's theory in detail, as well as its application to world myths. In 1945 he published a study on Book of Genesis; his subsequent books develop the World Ice Theory in light of other Bible books, the Atlantis myth, and the Tiwanaku archaeological site in Bolivia. The books he wrote with Peter Allen were awarded by the Sociedad Arqueológica de Bolivia in 1958.

In 1971 he finished a book by the deceased right-wing author Rudolf Elmayer von Vestenbrugg (1881–1970) Eingriffe aus den Kosmos (Interventions from Outer Space).

In 1975 Schindler delivered a lecture at the 2nd World Congress of the Ancient Astronaut Society in Zürich.

== Citations ==
"... considers the Moon to be a metallo-mineral body covered with a sphere of ice... captured out of transterrestrial space where, probably not so very long ago, it existed as an independent planet ...".

"... Hydrogen and oxygen exist in the universe in their natural combination H_{2}O, water, in its cosmic form: ice".

"When a block of this 'Cosmic Ice' plunges into a glowing star the impact generates heat. The ice turns into steam. Thermo-chemical decomposition splits the steam into its constituents. Most of the oxygen is bound to the stellar matter, producing more heat. Practically all the hydrogen is exhaled into space. The star-matter-bound oxygen and the 'spatial' hydrogen form the vast stores out of which the Cosmic Ice is generated and its supplies repleted". (Moons, Myths and Man, 1936)

== Works ==
- Moons, Myths and Man: A Reinterpretation. Faber & Faber: London, 1936, also 1949 revised
- The Book of Revelation is History.Faber & Faber: London, 1942
- Built before the Flood. The problem of the Tiahuanaco ruins. Faber & Faber: London, 1943
- In the Beginning God. A new scientific vindication of cosmogonic myths in the Book of Genesis. Faber & Faber: London, 1945
- The Atlantis Myth. Faber & Faber: London, 1948. 8o.
- Life History of our Earth. Based on the geological application of Hoerbiger's Theory. Faber & Faber: London, 1951
- The Calendar of Tiahuanaco. A disquisition on the time measuring system of the oldest civilization in the world. Faber & Faber: London, 1956, with Peter Allan
- The Great Idol of Tiahuanaco. An interpretation in the light of the Hoerbiger theory of satellites of the glyphs carved on its surface. Faber & Faber: London, 1959, with Peter Allan
