= Fauth (crater) =

Crater on the Moon

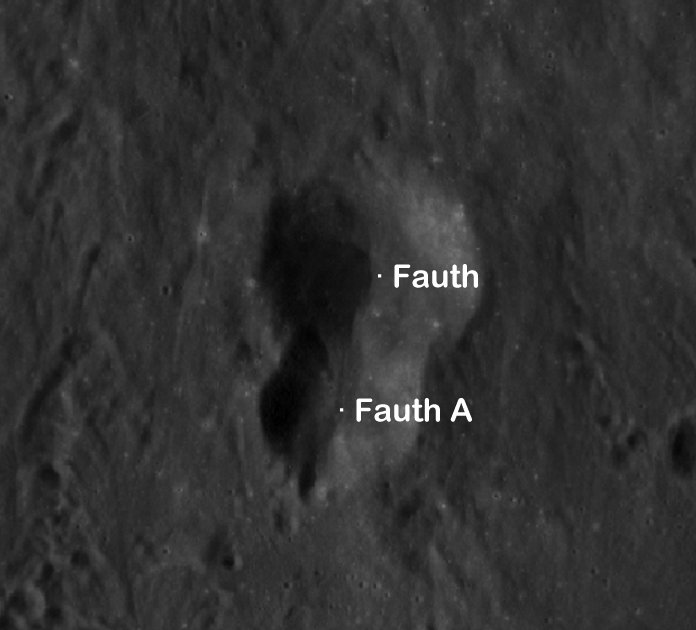
- LRO image of Fauth and its satellite crater Fauth A
- Coordinates: 6.3°N 20.1°W
- Diameter: 11.94 km (7.42 mi)
- Depth: 2.0 km (1.2 mi)
- Colongitude: 20° at sunrise
- Eponym: Philipp J. H. Fauth

Fauth is a small double-crater located at the edge of the rough southern ramparts of the prominent ray crater Copernicus on the Moon. It lies in the Mare Insularum, to the northeast of the crater Reinhold.

This formation is composed of the merged craters Fauth and the slightly smaller Fauth A, creating a keyhole-shaped formation. The latter craterlet cuts into the southern rim of Fauth and has a radius of 9.6 kilometers. Fauth is most likely a secondary crater that was created by the formation of Copernicus.

The crater is named after German selenographer Philipp Johann Heinrich Fauth (1867–1941). His name was introduced into lunar nomenclature by Austrian amateur selenographer Karl Müller. Its designation was formally adopted by the International Astronomical Union in 1935.

== Satellite craters ==
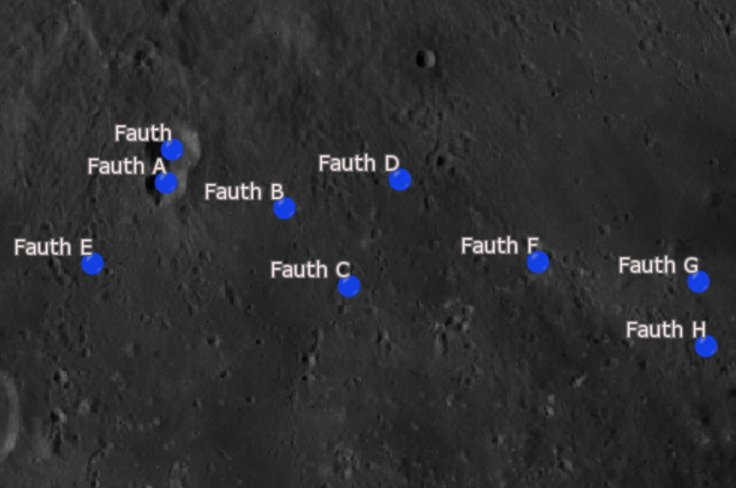
Fauth and its satellite craters

By convention these features are identified on lunar maps by placing the letter on the side of the crater midpoint that is closest to Fauth.

Fauth	Latitude	Longitude	Diameter
A	6.0° N	20.1° W	10 km
B	5.8° N	19.3° W	3 km
C	5.2° N	18.8° W	4 km
D	6.0° N	18.4° W	5 km
E	5.4° N	20.7° W	4 km
F	5.5° N	17.4° W	4 km
G	5.3° N	16.2° W	3 km
H	4.8° N	16.2° W	4 km
