= Hans Robert Scultetus =

German meteorologist

Hans Robert Scultetus (20 March 1904 in Halle (Saale) – 17 March 1976) was a German meteorologist, who headed the Pflegestätte für Wetterkunde (Meteorology Section) of the Nazi Ahnenerbe think tank. " Scultetus earned his PhD with the dissertation "Die Beobachtungen der Erdbodentemperaturen im Beobachtungsnetze des Preußischen Meteorologischen Instituts während der Jahre 1912 bis 1927" at the Berlin University in 1930.

Scultetus was appointed head of the Ahnenerbe's Meteorology Section by Heinrich Himmler, who was convinced that Hanns Hörbiger's Welteislehre could be used to provide accurate long-range weather forecasts. Scultetus held the SS rank of Obersturmführer (First Lieutenant) at the time.

Scultetus published Klimatologie in 1969.
