= Philipp Johann Heinrich Fauth =

German elementary school teacher and astronomer

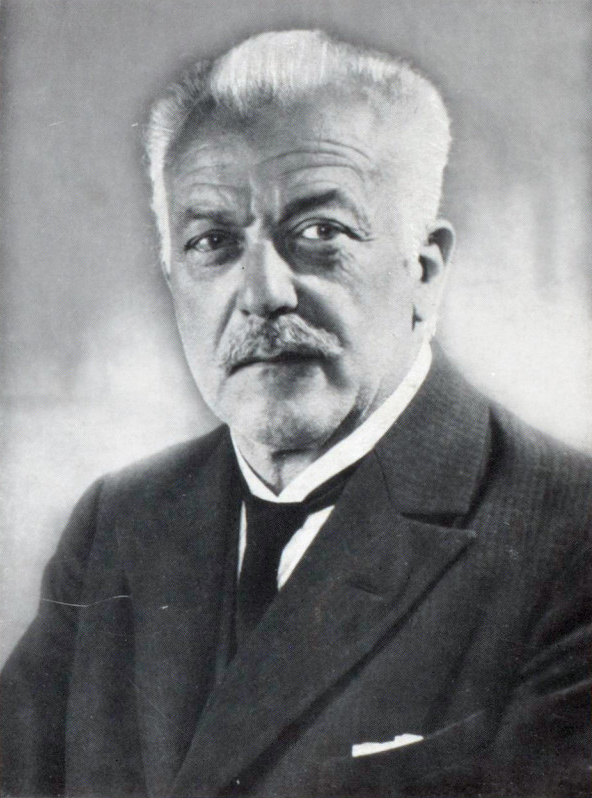
Philipp Johann Heinrich Fauth (1930)

Philipp Johann Heinrich Fauth (19 March 1867 – 4 January 1941) was a German elementary school teacher and astronomer who excelled in lunar research conducted during forty years in his observatories in Landstuhl (Palatinate, Germany) and later Grünwald (Bavaria). Thanks to a donation he could afford one of the highest quality telescopes in Germany. By the unconditional defense of the unscientific glacial cosmogony or world ice theory conceived by Austrian engineer Hanns Hörbiger he succumbed to a mistake he did not admit all his life.

== Life and work ==
=== Astronomical works ===
Philipp Fauth's area of work was the classical astronomy in the visible light spectrum, being primarily of an observational and descriptive nature, and was directed in particular to the Moon and its cartography, the so-called selenography, and the planets Mars, Jupiter and Saturn. Fauth was the last representative of a school of German selenographers, whose most important representatives were Tobias Mayer (1723–1762), J. Hieronymus Schroeter (1745–1816), Wilh. Gotthelf Lohrmann (1796–1840), J. Heinrich Mädler(1794–1874) and J.F. Julius Schmidt (1825–1884).

After the death of Nepomuk Krieger, Munich-Gern, Germany, in 1902, Fauth emerged as the leading German selenographer (Moon cartographer) of his time. Fauth's became best known for his drawings of lunar landscapes and his lunar maps. A (good) drawing at the time was superior to a photographic picture, especially when displaying large differences in brightness and very fine structures which could not be resolved well due to air turbulence by photography; moreover, it allowed to remove image defects or cast shadows from the image, change perspectives and do other image edits not possible with photographs at the time.

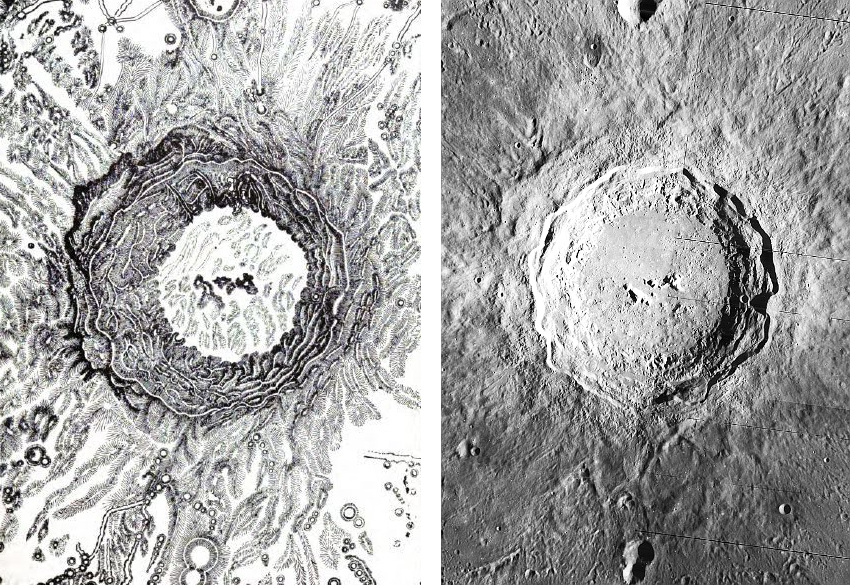
Comparison of Moon crater Copernicus as drawn by Philipp Fauth in 1932 und photographed by Lunar Orbiter 4 in 1967. The small double crater at the bottom of the pictures is named after Fauth.

"By 1899 Fauth had charted 2,532 previously undiscovered craterlets and rilles, and in another three years of work he had more than doubled this number ... A ruthless perfectionist, many of his drawings are marvels of accuracy in both proportion and in position. Fauth was the last of the great visual observers, and the very high standards he set for himself were never approached by his contemporaries".

A much debated question at the time was that of changes on the Moon. Again and again alleged changes on the Moon surface based on volcanism or lunar atmosphere were reported which had always been rigorously rejected by Fauth as errors of observation. Hermann Klein (1844–1914) from Cologne, Germany, claimed the formation of a new crater called "Hyginus N", and Krieger later reported a change in "Hyginus N1" which were all denied by Fauth. These debates soon turned into polemics and personal attacks.

Today it is consensus that in fact the very vast majority of reports about "transient lunar phenomena" (TLP) are caused by optical illusions, caused e.g. by the Earth's atmosphere (meteorite impacts which may cause small flashes of light and craters on the lunar surface are not meant by TLP). "The depth of understanding of the nature of lunar topography demonstrated by Fauth was certainly far superior to that possessed by the vast majority of his contemporaries", but he was not able to convince the astronomical community about this point. Reports of TLP will continue "to challenge today's consensus that the moon is dead" says Dobbins.

Fauth firmly believed that the Moon was covered by a (dust-covered) shield of water ice, for which he had many astute arguments but in this respect he was wrong. Dobbins retorts that measurements of the infrared radiation emitted by the Moon already existed in his time, indicating that lunar temperatures were above freezing at noon sunlight exposure. – Icy moons are not at all unusual, the Jupiter moon Europa is the most known example.

The large lunar atlas on a scale of 1:1 million (3.5 meters in diameter) Fauth sketched on 22 sheets over photographic and micrometer anchor points in decades of observation he could not finish anymore due to his death in 1941. It was not completed until 1964, 23 years after Fauth's death, by his son Hermann and published by Olbers-Gesellschaft in Bremen. Experts found a clear decline in quality between those sheets still drawn by the father and those by the son after his father's pencil sketches.

Fauth's map of the Moon was the last and largest ever published by a single researcher by telescopic observation of the Moon, leaving aside Fauth's direct predecessor, the disputed 300-inch-diameter (7.6 m) map published 1951 by Welsh engineer Hugh Percy Wilkins who made use of contributions from other authors and found a harsh appraisal e.g. by E. Both: "Neither positional nor artistic quality was at all commensurate with the quantity of detail represented"

By the time of the publication of Fauth's Moon atlas, NASA had already started an extensive exploration program with lunar probes (Ranger, Surveyor, Lunar Orbiter) in preparation of the Moon landings, which by means of photogrammetry compiled photographic maps of the Moon with coordinates and contour lines, including also the far side of the Moon.

Likewise, the U.S. Air Force had prepared by then lunar astronautical charts in traditional telescope observation at Lowell Observatory, Flagstaff, Arizona in the same scale of 1:1 million in eight years work by a 22-member staff.

=== Observatories ===
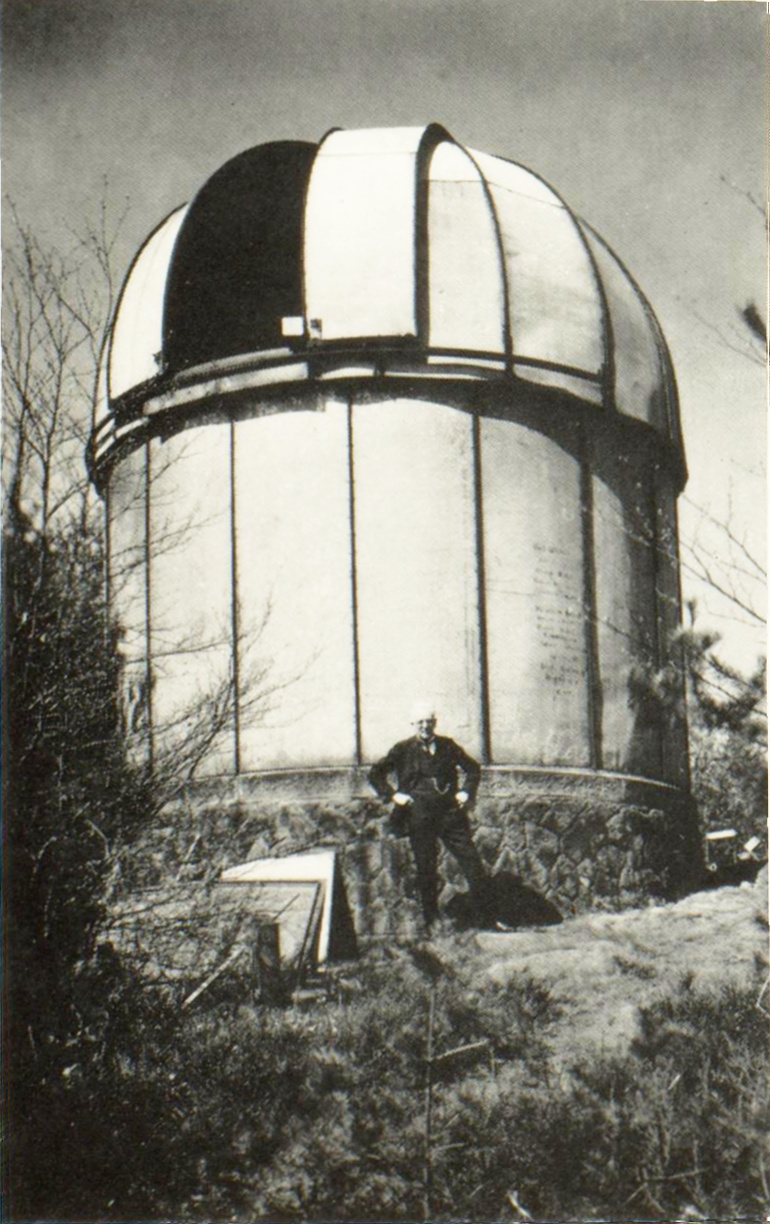
Philipp Fauth and his third observatory on the Kirchberg hill near Landstuhl, c. 1930

Fauth built and operated a total of four observatories in Germany. In 1890 he established his first observatory on a hilltop in the south of Kaiserslautern. 1895, after his transfer as a teacher to Landstuhl, he moved it to Kirchberg hill near Landstuhl very close to the place where the U.S. Army now operates its Landstuhl Hospital.

Due to a generous private donation Fauth bought a new and larger telescope in 1911, the "legendary" Schupmann Medial, a 38.5 cm-refractor with excellent color fidelity, "the largest astrotelescope of Germany south of Potsdam" and thus one of Germany's most powerful telescopes, for which he built a new observatory just south of the previous one.

In 1923 Philipp Fauth was expelled from the Palatinate by the French occupation in response to the German passive resistance whereupon he was put to work in a Munich school. In the following time he used (among others) the telescopes of the Deutsches Museum in Munich, Bavaria, Germany. In 1930 he moved the medial telescope to Bavaria and built his fourth and last observatory on the outskirts of Grünwald, 14 km south of Munich.

=== Welteislehre (World Ice Theory) ===
In 1902 Fauth met the Austrian engineer and amateur astronomer Hanns Hörbiger who developed an elaborated theory about the composition of the Solar System and its formation, the glacial cosmogony or Welteislehre (world ice theory, WEL) which was already rejected soon after its creation by the vast majority of the scientific community. Nonetheless, it reached great popularity among laypeople in Germany and Austria in the 1920s and 1930s. Also some leading national socialists, in particular Reichsführer SS Heinrich Himmler, became supporters of the Welteislehre.

In 1913 the 772-page standard work to WEL Hörbiger's Glacial-Kosmogonie was published. Even if Fauth was only named as editor of the book, he contributed a more-than-insignificant part of the writing and brought order to Hörbiger's somewhat woolly thoughts.

With the support and defense of WEL, Fauth succumbed to a mistake he did not want to admit as long as he lived.

=== Honors ===
The International Astronomical Union (IAU), based in Paris, honored Fauth in 1932 as one of the few living to whom this honor was bestowed by naming a double crater on the Moon after him, lying about 40 km to the south of the large Copernicus crater.

1939, at the age of seventy-one, Fauth received an honorary professor recognition for his almost fifty years of scientific work at the instigation of Chief of SS Heinrich Himmler, being also president of the NS research organization Deutsches Ahnenerbe (German ancestral heritage). In the same year 1939 Fauth was appointed member of the International Astronomical Union (IAU) to Commission 16 "Physical Observations of the Planets and Satellites".

In 1920 Fauth was appointed honorary member of the German natural research association Pollichia, having been the founder and first editor (1904–1908) of the club magazine Pfälzische Heimatkunde (local history of Palatinate). In 1925 Fauth became a corresponding member of the Palatinate Academy for the Promotion of Sciences.

At his death in 1941, sixty-six German-language newspapers from Hamburg to Vienna honored the prominent Fauth with an obituary. In Kaiserslautern, Landstuhl, Bad Dürkheim and Grünwald streets were named after Fauth.

=== Time of National Socialism ===
In 1937 Philipp Fauth sold his private observatory at Grünwald to the national socialist (NS) research association Deutsches Ahnenerbe (German ancestral heritage) and continued his research as an employee of the Ahnenerbe until his death in 1941. In the Ahnenerbe, Fauth continued his work on the large Moon atlas and the WEL. Alongside he proposed the setup of people ("Volks") observatories, telescopes and microscopes, but the plans were stalled soon after outbreak of World War II.

By joining the Ahnenerbe, Fauth who had worked alone for all his life (having a short-time assistant paid by the Ahnenerbe for the first time) wanted to secure the future of his valuable telescope too. This intention failed, the instrument was lost in the turmoil of World War II.

Fauth did not comment publicly on politics in the Third Reich. Memberships of Fauth's in the German Nationalsocialist Party (NSDAP) and the SS were thoroughly investigated in 2022/23 and could not be validated.

== Publications (selection) ==
- Beobachtungen der Planeten Jupiter und Mars in den Oppositionen des Jahres 1896/97, 1898
- mit A. Mang: Wegweiser am Himmel (Signposts in the Sky), 1904
- Was wir vom Mond wissen (What We Know of the Moon), 1906
- mit A. Mang: Einfache Himmelskunde, 1908
- The Moon in Modern Astronomy, in Engl. language, 1908
- Hörbigers Glacial-Kosmogonie, 1913
- 25 Jahre Planetenforschung, 1916
- Jupiterbeobachtungen während 35 Jahren, 1925
- Der Mond und Hörbigers Welteislehre, 1925
- Mondesschicksal. Wie er ward und untergeht. Eine glazialkosmogonische Studie, 1925
- Unser Mond – wie man ihn lesen sollte (Our moon – how to read it), 1936
- Mondatlas, 1964 (posthumous)

== Literature ==
- Hermann Fauth, Freddy Litten (ed.): Philipp Fauth – Leben und Werk (Life and Work) (= Algorism. Issue 9), Institut für Geschichte der Naturwissenschaften, Munich 1993, ISBN 3-89241-008-9.
- W.P. Sheehan, T.A. Dobbins: Epic Moon – A history of lunar exploration in the age of the telescope, Willmann-Bell, 2001, ISBN 0-943396-70-0
- Hermann Fauth: Philipp Fauth and the Moon, Sky&Telescope, Nov. 1959, p. 20-24
- Klaus Brasch: Philipp Fauth: Last of the Great Lunar Mappers, Vol. 114, No. 3, Jun 2020, p. 118-122
- W. Fallot-Burghardt: Was gibt es Neues vom pfälzischen Mondforscher Philipp Fauth?, Pfälzer Heimat, Jg. 75, 1/2024, in German language
- Hockey, Thomas (2009). "Fauth, Philipp Johann Heinrich". Biographical Encyclopedia of Astronomers. Springer Publishing. pp. 703–705. doi:10.1007/978-1-4419-9917-7_441. ISBN 978-0-387-31022-0. Archived from the original on 2018-06-04.
