= Hoerbiger Holding =

Manufacturing company

- Company type: Public limited company
- Industry: Energy sector, process industry, automotive industry, mechanical engineering industry, safety engineering, electrical industry
- Founded: 1925
- Headquarters: Zug, Switzerland
- Key people: Thorsten Kahlert (CEO and Chairman of the Group Executive Committee); Martin Komischke (chairman of the board of directors)
- Revenue: EUR 1.267 billion
- Number of employees: 5948
- Website: http://www.hoerbiger.com/

Hoerbiger Holding AG is a globally active group headquartered in Zug, Switzerland. The group has its origins in the trading company Hoerbiger & Co, founded by Hanns Hörbiger in Vienna in 1925, and is now represented in 43 countries with 127 production and service locations.

== History ==
The roots of today's company lie in the engineering office founded by Hanns Hörbiger and Friedrich Wilhelm Rogler in Budapest, which was moved to Vienna in 1903. This developed into the trading company Hoerbiger & Co. in 1925. Alfred Hörbiger, one of Hörbiger's sons, joined the company in 1925 and took over its management, while Hanns Hörbiger devoted himself to scientific studies until his death in 1931.

In 1945, the main plant in Vienna-Simmering was largely destroyed, along with parts of the company's intellectual property. Meanwhile, production could be continued in alternative workshops.

In 1997, Hoerbiger Holding AG was founded as an operational umbrella holding company in Switzerland. Since then, it has set the long-term strategic framework.

In 2007, Hoerbiger took over the Oberstenfeld site of the automotive supplier Getrag. The pneumatic division Hoerbiger-Origa was sold to the American Parker-Hannifin in October 2008. In 2009, Hoerbiger bought Altronic, Inc. in Girard, Ohio, US. The Engine business unit continues to operate Altronic as a sub-brand. The pneumatic seat comfort systems business was sold to France's Faurecia in October 2010.

In 2010, the Hoerbiger Foundation initiated the establishment of the JKU HOERBIGER Research Institute for Smart Actuators at Johannes Kepler University Linz.

In 2015, Hoerbiger acquired the company IEP Technologies and built up the Safety Business Unit from this with further acquisitions (Newson Gale, Brilex and Atexon).

In 2016, the Vienna headquarters (Compression) moved from Vienna-Simmering to a new building in the Urban Lakeside of Aspern.

In 2019, Hoerbiger acquired Deublin, a company headquartered in Waukegan, Illinois, USA. Deublin is considered a market leader in rotary union solutions.

== Activity ==
Hoerbiger is currently divided into five operating units: The two divisions Compression and Automotive as well as the three business units Rotary, Engine and Safety.

- The Compression Division supplies components, systems and services for reciprocating compressors and gas flow control systems.
- The Automotive Division is a component and system supplier for passenger car and commercial vehicle manufacturers and their Tier 1 suppliers.
- The Rotary business unit supplies rotary unions and electrical slip rings.
- The Engine business unit supplies injectors, controls and ignition systems for gaseous fuels such as hydrogen.
- The Safety business unit supplies explosion protection solutions for industrial processing and power generation plants.
