= Hanns Hörbiger =

Austrian inventor and scientist (1860–1931)

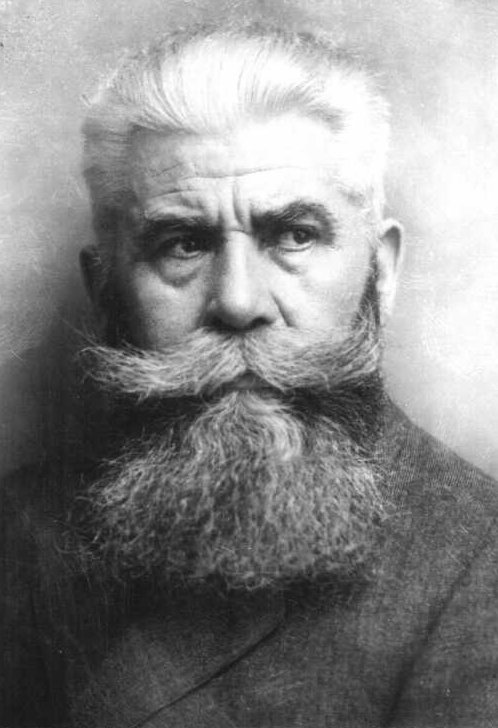
- Born: 29 November 1860; Atzgersdorf, Austria-Hungary
- Died: 11 October 1931 (aged 70); Mauer, Republic of Austria
- Known for: Welteislehre ("World Ice doctrine")

Johannes "Hanns" Evangelist Hörbiger (29 November 1860 – 11 October 1931) was an Austrian engineer from Vienna with roots in Tyrol. He took part in the construction of the Budapest Metro and in 1894 invented a new type of valve essential for compressors still in widespread use today.

He is also remembered today for his pseudoscientific Welteislehre ("World Ice doctrine").

== Early life ==
Hanns Hörbiger was born in Atzgersdorf, a suburb of Liesing, Vienna, and studied engineering at the local Technical College.

In 1894 Hörbiger had an idea for a new design of blast furnace blowing engine: he replaced the old and easily damaged leather flap valves with a steel valve. Opening and closing automatically, and light and frictionless guided, the disk valve eliminated all the drawbacks of previous valve designs.

Hörbiger registered a patent for his invention, which smoothed the way for efficient steel production and greater productivity in mining. High-pressure chemistry and the global network of gas exchange – none of these would be possible without the Hörbiger Valve.

In 1900, Hanns Hörbiger and the engineer Friedrich Wilhelm Rogler founded an engineer’s office in Budapest, which was moved to Vienna in 1903. By 1925 it had developed into the Hörbiger & Co. company. Alfred Hörbiger, one of Hörbiger’s sons, joined the company in 1925 and assumed the management, while Hanns Hörbiger devoted himself to scientific study until his death in 1931. Two other sons, Attila and Paul became actors.

The company developed rapidly under Alfred Hörbiger’s management: a production facility was taken into service in Vienna and an affiliated company was set up in Düsseldorf. Hörbiger expanded into England and concluded numerous licensing agreements with leading manufacturers of piston blowers, compressors and ships’ Diesel engines in Europe and North America.

The disk valve became more sophisticated: Hörbiger developed highlift or high-pressure valves, compressor control systems and damper plates. By 1937, 98% of production was destined for export. The name Hörbiger had become a dependable trademark in valve and control technology for compressors. As of 2017, the engineering company founded by Hanns Hörbiger still exists as Hoerbiger and is a major supplier of compression technology.

== Welteislehre ==
Hörbiger is nowadays chiefly remembered for his Welteislehre ("World Ice Doctrine"), which he first put forward in the 1913 book, Wirbelstürme, Wetterstürze, Hagelkatastrophen und Marskanal-Verdoppelungen, written in collaboration with amateur astronomer Philipp Fauth. According to this theory, ice comprised most of the matter of the universe. Hörbiger's theories were later popularized by H.S. Bellamy, and influenced Hans Robert Scultetus, head of the Pflegestätte für Wetterkunde (Meteorology Section) of the SS-Ahnenerbe, who believed that Welteislehre could be used to provide accurate long-range weather forecasts.

== Occidental ==
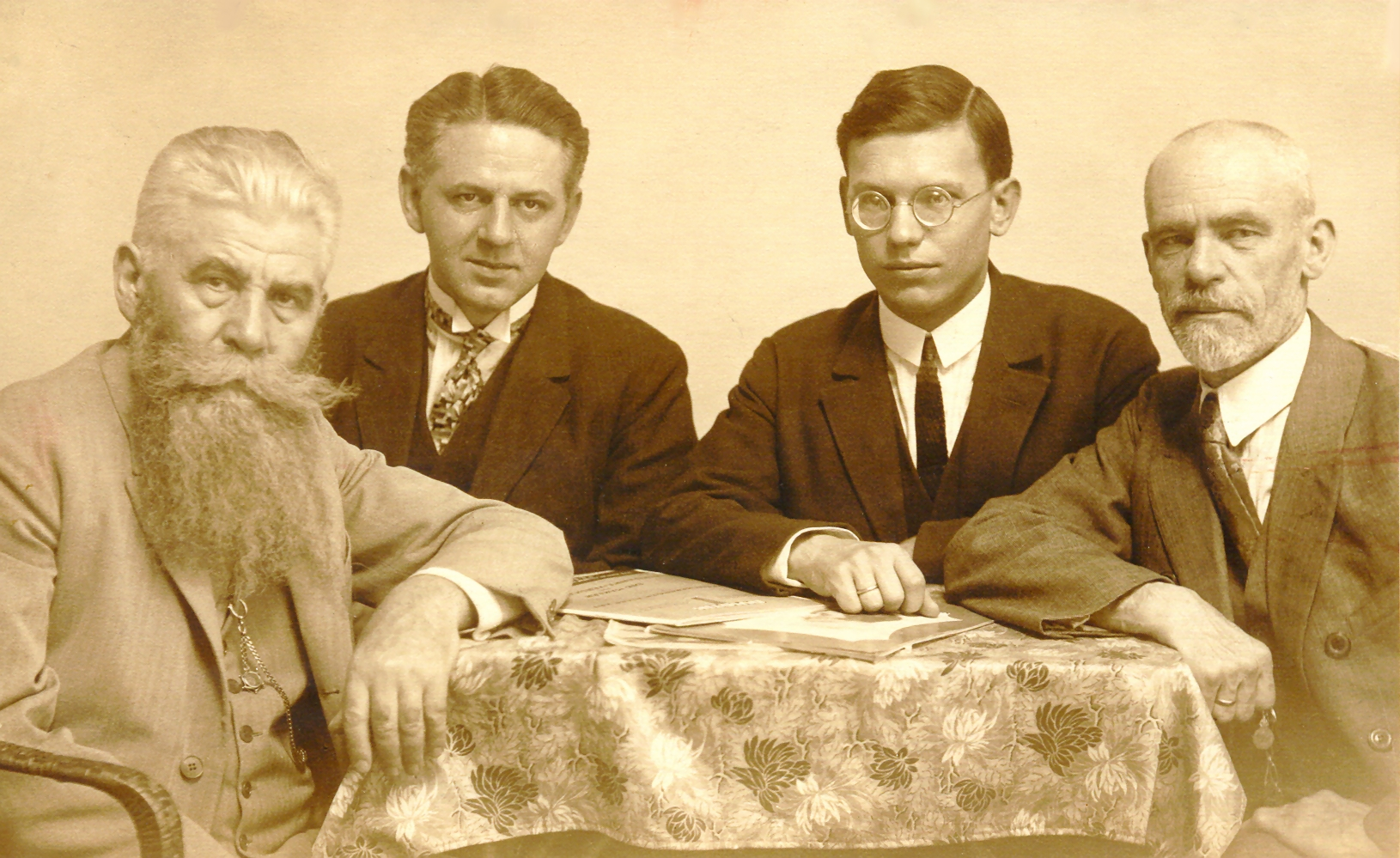
Hörbiger (left) seated with at a conference for Occidental along with Edgar de Wahl (right), the creator of the language, and his son Hans Robert (center left).

Hörbiger was an early supporter and financial backer of the planned language Occidental, now officially known as Interlingue. His financial support was instrumental in allowing Occidental's main publication Cosmoglotta to "gain a circle of readers despite the economic crisis" during the period when its redactorial office was located in Vienna. His sons Hans Robert Hörbiger and Alfred also contributed to Cosmoglotta and were Occidentalists.

== Family ==
Two of Hörbiger's sons, Paul and Attila, were matinée idols in the interwar years, and Paul Hörbiger's granddaughter Mavie Hörbiger also went on to become a celebrated actress. His two other sons devoted themselves to promoting their father's theory. Best known of the present Hörbiger generations is Attila's daughter Christiane.

== Honors ==
The Deslandres crater on the Moon was designated Hörbiger by Philipp Fauth on his private lunar chart; it subsequently received the official name of Deslandres, following a 1942 suggestion by E. M. Antoniadi in 1942, which was approved at the International Astronomical Union's 1948 General Assembly. The name Hörbiger is still seen on the Hallwag moonmap made by Hans Schwarzenbach. There exists a stamp depicting him.
