= Welteislehre =

Pseudoscientific cosmological theory by Hanns Hörbiger

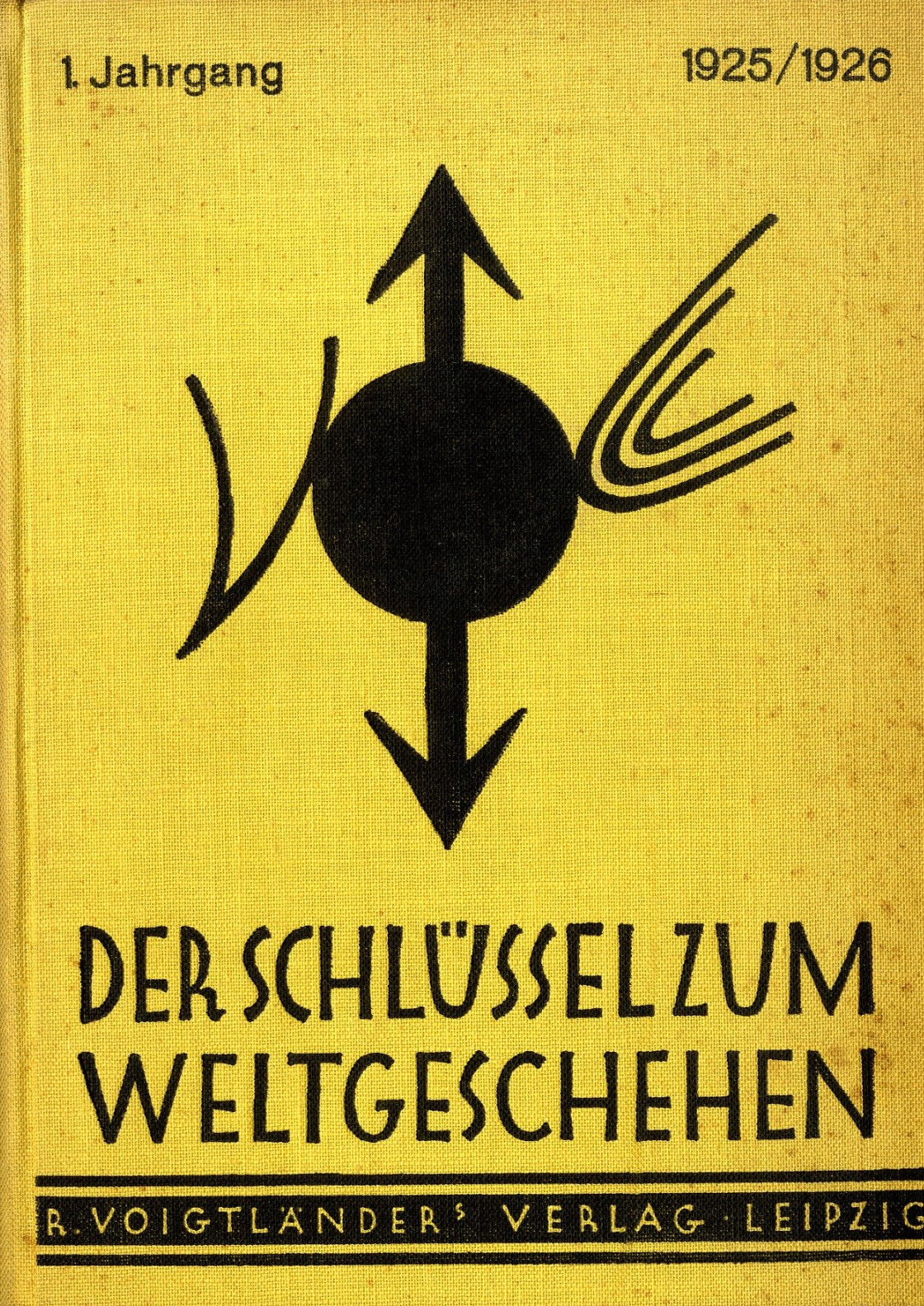
The 1925 "Journal of World Ice Theory"

Welteislehre (WEL; "World Ice Theory" or "World Ice Doctrine"), also known as Glazial-Kosmogonie (Glacial Cosmogony), is a discredited cosmological concept proposed by Hanns Hörbiger, an Austrian engineer and inventor. According to his ideas, ice was the basic substance of all cosmic processes, and ice moons, ice planets, and the "global ether" (also made of ice) had determined the entire development of the universe. Hörbiger did not arrive at his ideas through research, but said that he had received it in a "vision" in 1894. He published a book about the theory in 1912 and heavily promoted it in subsequent years, through lectures, magazines and associations.

== History ==
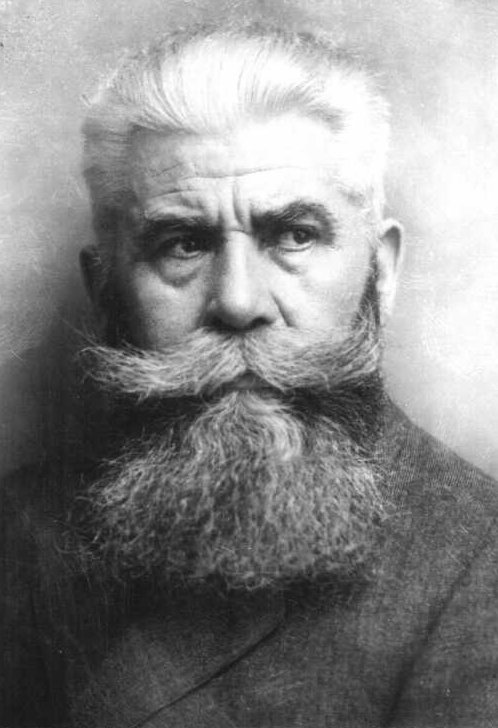
Hanns Hörbiger

By his own account, Hörbiger was observing the Moon when he was struck by the notion that the brightness and roughness of its surface were due to ice. Shortly after, he dreamt that he was floating in space watching the swinging of a pendulum which grew longer and longer until it broke. "I knew that Newton had been wrong and that the sun's gravitational pull ceases to exist at three times the distance of Neptune", he concluded. He worked out his concepts in collaboration with amateur astronomer and schoolteacher Philipp Fauth whom he met in 1898, and published it as Glazial-Kosmogonie in 1912. Fauth had previously produced a large (if somewhat inaccurate) lunar map and had a considerable following, which lent Hörbiger's ideas some respectability.

It did not receive a great deal of attention at the time, but following World War I Hörbiger changed his strategy by promoting the new "cosmic truth" not only to people at universities and academies, but also to the general public. Hörbiger thought that if "the masses" accepted his ideas, then they might put enough pressure on the academic establishment to force his ideas into the mainstream. No effort was spared in popularising the ideas: "cosmotechnical" societies were founded, which offered public lectures that attracted large audiences, there were cosmic ice movies and radio programs, and even cosmic ice journals and novels.

During this period, the name was changed from the Graeco-Latin Glazial-Kosmogonie to the Germanic Welteislehre [WEL] ("World ice theory"). The followers of WEL exerted a great deal of public pressure on behalf of the ideas. The movement published posters, pamphlets, books, and even a newspaper The Key to World Events. Companies owned by adherents would only hire people who declared themselves convinced of the WEL's truth. Some followers even attended astronomical meetings to heckle, shouting, "Out with astronomical orthodoxy! Give us Hörbiger!"

Supporters of the idea were Houston Stewart Chamberlain, the leading theorist behind the early development of the Nazi Party in Germany in 1923, and later both Hitler and Himmler. Esoteric and pseudo-scientific views were quite popular among the Nazi elite at the time, and WEL appealed to them because it represented a "Germanic" all-encompassing alternative to a natural science viewed as Jewish and soulless.

Despite Hitler's claim that the WEL constituted an "Aryan" theory, a number of Jewish intellectuals supported the theory: for example, Viennese author Egon Friedell, who explained the World Ice Theory in his 1930 Cultural History of the Modern Age. Hans Schindler Bellamy, a Jewish member of the Social Democratic Party of Austria, was also a proponent. He continued to advocate the viewpoint after he had fled Vienna following the Anschluss. On the left wing Raoul Hausmann also supported the theory, and corresponded with Hörbiger.

Two organizations were set up in Vienna concerned with the idea: the Kosmotechnische Gesellschaft and the Hörbiger Institute. The first was formed in 1921 by a group of enthusiastic adherents of the idea, which included engineers, physicians, civil servants, and businessmen. Most had been personally acquainted with Hörbiger and had attended his many lectures.

== Premise ==
According to the idea, the Solar System had its origin in a gigantic star into which a smaller, dead, waterlogged star fell. This impact caused a huge explosion that flung fragments of the smaller star out into interstellar space where the water condensed and froze into giant blocks of ice. A ring of such blocks formed, that we now call the Milky Way, as well as a number of solar systems among which was our own, but with many more planets than currently exist.

Interplanetary space is filled with traces of hydrogen gas, which cause the planets to slowly spiral inwards, along with ice blocks. The outer planets are large mainly because they have swallowed a large number of ice blocks, but the inner planets have not swallowed nearly as many. One can see ice blocks on the move in the form of meteors, and when one collides with Earth, it produces hailstorms over an area of many square kilometers, while when one falls into the Sun, it produces a sunspot and gets vaporized, making "fine ice", that covers the innermost planets.

It was also claimed that Earth had had several satellites before it acquired the Moon; they began as planets in orbits of their own, but over long spans of time were captured one by one and slowly spiralled in towards Earth until they disintegrated and their debris became part of Earth's structure. One can supposedly identify the rock strata of several geological eras with the impacts of these satellites. It was believed that the destruction of earlier ice-moons were responsible for the Flood.

The last such impact, of the "Tertiary" or "Cenozoic Moon" and the capture of our present Moon, is supposedly remembered through myths and legends. This was worked out in detail by Hörbiger's English follower Hans Schindler Bellamy; Bellamy recounted how as a child he would often dream about a large moon that would spiral closer and closer in until it burst, making the ground beneath roll and pitch, awakening him and giving him a very sick feeling. When he looked at the Moon's surface through a telescope, he found its surface looking troublingly familiar. When he learned of Hörbiger's idea in 1921, he found it a description of his dream. He explained the mythological support he found in such books as Moons, Myths, and Man, In the Beginning God, and The Book of Revelation is History. It was believed that our current Moon was the sixth since Earth began and that a new collision was inevitable. Believers argued that the great flood described in the Bible and the destruction of Atlantis were caused by the fall of previous moons.

Hörbiger had various responses to the criticism that he received. If it was pointed out to him that his assertions did not work mathematically, he responded: "Calculation can only lead you astray." If it was pointed out that there existed photographic evidence that the Milky Way was composed of millions of stars, he responded that the pictures had been faked by "reactionary" astronomers. He responded in a similar way when it was pointed out that the surface temperature of the Moon had been measured in excess of 100 °C in the daytime, writing to rocket expert Willy Ley: "Either you believe in me and learn, or you will be treated as the enemy."

== See also ==
- Interstellar ice
- Snowball Earth
- Lunar water
- Nazi mysticism
