= List of Nazis (A–E) =

The following is a list of notable people from A to E (last name) who were at some point a follower of the ideology of Nazism or affiliated with the Nazi Party. This is not meant to be a list of every person who was ever a member of the Nazi Party, some entries can be found elsewhere on the encyclopedia.

== List criteria ==
This list only covers notable figures who were active within the party, did something significant within it that is of historical note, and/or were members of the Nazi Party according to multiple reliable publications. The following entries however are excluded here as they can be found on their own respective lists:

- Doctors - notable "Nazi doctors" are covered at: List of Nazi doctors
- SS personnel - notable people within the ranks are covered at: List of SS personnel (Nazis by default)

For a list of the main leaders and most important party figures see: List of Nazi Party leaders and officials.

Overview A–E F–K L–R S–Z

== A ==
Name	Birth	Death	Occupation (Note: Occupation before Nazi Germany surrender)	Nationality (Note: Nationality at time of death)	Reference(s)
Albert Abicht	December 9, 1893	January 5, 1973	Politician	Germany	
Hermann Josef Abs	October 15, 1901	February 5, 1994	Banker	Germany	
Karl Ferdinand Abt	June 9, 1903	March 1, 1945 (Note: Exact date unknown)	Politician	Nazi Germany	
Ernst Achenbach	April 9, 1909	December 2, 1991	Diplomat	Germany	
Eberhard Achterberg	January 9, 1910	August 11, 1983	Propagandist	Germany	
Josef Ackermann	April 26, 1905	March 5, 1997	Politician	Germany	
Karl Adam (rowing coach)	May 2, 1912	June 18, 1976	Rowing coach	Germany	
Karl Adam (theologian)	October 22, 1876	April 1, 1966	Theologian	Germany	
Wilhelm Adam	March 28, 1893	November 24, 1978	Wehrmacht officer	Germany	
Ernst Ahl	September 1, 1898	February 14, 1945	Wehrmacht officer	Nazi Germany	
Wolf Albach-Retty	May 28, 1906	February 21, 1967	Actor	Austria	
Karl Albiker	September 16, 1878	February 26, 1961	Artist	Germany	
Herbert Albrecht	January 12, 1900	June 13, 1945	Agricultural Specialist	Nazi Germany	
Felix Allfarth	July 5, 1901	Unknown	Merchant	Nazi Germany	
Günther Altenburg	June 5, 1894	October 23, 1984	Diplomat	Germany	
Wolfgang Aly	August 12, 1881	September 3, 1962	Classical philologist	Germany	
Otto Ambros	May 19, 1901	July 23, 1990	Chemist	Germany	
Heinrich Anacker	January 29, 1901	January 14, 1971	Author	Switzerland	
Charlotte Ander	August 14, 1902	August 5, 1969	Actress	Germany	
Sepp Angerer	January 1, 1899	December 31, 1961	Art dealer	Nazi Germany	
Joachim Angermeyer	December 18, 1923	May 8, 1997	Politician	Germany	
Ernst Anrich	August 9, 1906	October 21, 2001	Professor	Germany	
Friedrich Asinger	June 26, 1907	March 7, 1999	Chemist	Austria	
Karl Astel	February 26, 1898	April 4, 1945	Rector	Nazi Germany	
Prince August Wilhelm of Prussia	January 29, 1887	March 25, 1949	Royalty	Germany	
Hans Walter Aust	June 20, 1900	April 28, 1983	Journalist	Germany	
Artur Axmann	February 18, 1913	October 24, 1996	Reichsjugendführer	Germany	
Georg Ay	June 9, 1900	February 1, 1997	Politician	Germany	
Albert Bach	November 29, 1910	July 22, 2003	Generalmajor	Austria	
Georg Bachmann	December 6, 1885	October 23, 1971	Politician	Germany	
Alfred Baeumler	November 18, 1887	March 19, 1968	Philosopher	Germany	
Rudolf Bamler	May 6, 1896	March 13, 1972	Generalmajor	Germany	
Ewald Banse	May 23, 1883	October 31, 1953	Geographer	Germany	

== B ==
- Kunigunde Bachl
- Ludwig Friedrich Barthel
- Friedrich Franz Bauer
- Hans Baumann
- Eleonore Baur
- Walter Becher
- Helene Bechstein
- Peter Emil Becker
- Heinrich Behmann
- Josefa Berens-Totenohl
- Claus Bergen
- Ernst Bergmann (philosopher)
- Hugo Bernatzik
- German Bestelmeyer
- Friedrich Bethge
- Wilhelm Beyer
- Heinrich Beythien
- Ludwig Bieberbach
- Hans Biebow
- Dorothea Binz
- Horst Birr
- Otto Christian Archibald von Bismarck
- Friedrich Wilhelm von Bissing
- Walter Bitterlich
- Herbert Blankenhorn
- Hanns Blaschke
- Wilhelm Blaschke
- Anneliese Bläsing
- Johannes Blaskowitz
- Leopold Blauensteiner
- Kurt Blecha
- Karl Blessing
- Karl Blessinger
- Willi Bloedorn
- Werner von Blomberg
- Heinrich Blume
- Walter Blume
- Rudolf Bockelmann
- Peter Boenisch
- Herbert Böhme
- Andreas Bolek
- Ernst Bollmann
- Otto Friedrich Bollnow
- Friedrich Bolte
- Helmut de Boor
- Carl Friedrich Wilhelm Borgward
- Taras Borodajkewycz
- Hugo Ferdinand Boss
- Maximilian Böttcher
- Johanna Braach
- Fritz Bracht
- Therese Brandl
- Heinz Brandt
- Peter Paul Brauer
- Otto Bräutigam
- Arno Breker
- Hans Karl Breslauer
- Martin Broszat
- Hugo Bruckmann
- Helmuth Brückner
- Walter Brugmann
- Otto Brunner
- Ewald Bucher
- Karl von Buchka
- Erwin Bumke
- Hans Bunge
- Wilhelm Amsinck Burchard-Motz
- Adolf Butenandt
- Rudolf Buttmann

== C ==
- Christopher Leblanc
- Paul Carell
- Hans Carste
- Karl Carstens
- Peter Carstens
- Werner Catel
- Karl Chmielewski
- Walter Christaller
- Friedrich Christiansen
- Heinrich Class
- Carl Clauberg
- Hans Clemens
- Volker von Collande
- Klaus Conrad
- Leonardo Conti
- Werner Conze
- Rudolf Creutz
- Max de Crinis

== D ==
- Kurt Daluege
- Ernst Damzog
- Theodor Dannecker
- Konrad Dannenberg
- Luise Danz
- Fritz Darges
- Richard Walther Darré
- Adolf Dassler
- Fritz Dassler
- Rudolf Dassler
- Wilhelm Decker
- Peter Deeg
- Karl Deichgräber
- Ewald von Demandowsky
- Karl Maria Demelhuber
- Gerhard Dengler
- Oskar-Hubert Dennhardt
- Heinrich Deubel
- Otto Dickel
- Karl Diebitsch
- Hans-Heinrich Dieckhoff
- Rudolf Diels
- Oskar Dienstbach
- Eduard Dietl
- Josef Dietrich
- Otto Dietrich
- Hans Diller
- Erwin Ding-Schuler
- Erich Dinges
- Hugo Dingler
- Artur Dinter
- Herbert von Dirksen
- Oskar Dirlewanger
- Hugo Distler
- Paul Dittel
- Heimito von Doderer
- Eugen Dollmann
- Willi Domgraf-Fassbaender
- Karl Dönitz
- Richard Donnevert
- Alexander von Dörnberg
- Claude Dornier
- Julius Dorpmüller
- Hans Dorr
- Franz Xaver Dorsch
- Richard Drauz
- Otto-Heinrich Drechsler
- Wilhelm Dreher
- Margot Dreschel
- Anton Drexler
- Georg Ferdinand Duckwitz
- Anton Dunckern
- Karlfried Graf Dürckheim

== E ==
- Irmfried Eberl
- Karl von Eberstein
- Dietrich Eckart
- Joachim Albrecht Eggeling
- Hans Ehlich
- Horst Ehmke
- Carl Ehrenberg
- Arthur Ehrhardt
- Erich Ehrlinger
- Adolf Eichmann
- Theodor Eicke
- August Eigruber
- Hans Eisele (physician)
- Walter Eisfeld
- Paul Freiherr von Eltz-Rübenach
- Otmar Emminger
- Hans Endres
- Franz Ritter von Epp
- Hans Eppinger
- Erhard Eppler
- Josef Erber
- Eduard Erdmann
- Otto von Erdmannsdorff
- Ernst II, Duke of Saxe-Altenburg
- Hans-Dietrich Ernst
- Karl Ernst
- Karl Escherich
- Ernst Wilhelm Eschmann
- Karl Eschweiler
- Hermann Esser
- Arnold Eucken
- Richard Euringer
- Hanns Heinz Ewers
- Olve Eggen

== Bibliography ==
- Klee, Ernst: Das Personenlexikon zum Dritten Reich. Wer war was vor und nach 1945. Fischer Taschenbuch Verlag, Zweite aktualisierte Auflage, Frankfurt am Main 2005 ISBN 978-3-596-16048-8
- Klee, Ernst Das Kulturlexikon zum Dritten Reich. Wer war was vor und nach 1945. S. Fischer, Frankfurt am Main 2007 ISBN 978-3-10-039326-5
- Snyder, Louis Leo, Encyclopedia of the Third Reich, Ware: Wordsworth Editions, 1998 (originally published New York City: McGraw-Hill, 1976)
- Wistrich, Robert S. (2001). Who's who in Nazi Germany (3 ed.). Routledge. ISBN 0-415-26038-8.
