= List of Nazis (S–Z) =

A list of notable people who were at some point members of the defunct Nazi Party (NSDAP). It is not meant to be listing every person who was ever a member of the Nazi Party. This is a list of notable figures who were active within the party and whose course of action was somewhat of historical significance, or who were members of the Nazi Party according to multiple reliable sources. For a list of the main leaders and most important party figures see: List of Nazi Party leaders and officials.

Overview A–E F–K L–R S–Z

== S ==
- Ernst Sagebiel
- Ernst von Salomon
- Ferdinand von Sammern-Frankenegg
- Martin Sandberger
- Eugen Sänger
- Fritz Sauckel
- Albert Sauer
- Karl Saur
- Charles Edward, Duke of Saxe-Coburg and Gotha
- Princess Alexandra of Saxe-Coburg and Gotha
- Georg, Prince of Saxe-Meiningen
- Fritz Schachermeyr
- Emanuel Schäfer
- Georg Schäfer
- Paul Schäfer
- Georg Schaltenbrand
- Hermann Schaper
- Paul Scharfe
- Willi Schatz
- Julius Schaub
- Wolrad, Prince of Schaumburg-Lippe
- Gustav Adolf Scheel
- Walter Scheel
- Walter Schellenberg
- Helmut Schelsky
- Hans Schemm
- Ernst Günther Schenck
- Wilhelm Schepmann
- Julian Scherner
- Max Erwin von Scheubner-Richter
- Gustav Schickedanz
- Walter Schieber
- Theodor Schieder
- Karl Schiller
- Max von Schillings
- Walter Schimana
- Oskar Schindler
- Baldur von Schirach
- August Schirmer
- Ernst Schlange
- Franz Schlegelberger
- Hans Schleif
- Walter Schlesinger
- Hanns-Martin Schleyer
- Clemens Schmalstich
- Ludwig Schmidseder
- Heinrich Schmidt (physician)
- Heinrich Schmidt (politician)
- Paul Schmidt (interpreter)
- Willy Schmidt-Gentner
- Gustav Hermann Schmischke
- Carl Schmitt
- Kurt Schmitt
- Philipp Schmitt
- Paul Schmitthenner
- Hermann Schmitz
- Rudolf Schmundt
- Carl Schneider
- Christian Schneider
- Hans Ernst Schneider
- Georg von Schnitzler
- Gertrud Scholtz-Klink
- Fritz von Scholz
- Karl Eberhard Schöngarth
- Franz Schönhuber
- Ferdinand Schörner
- Vinzenz Schöttl
- Konrad Schragmüller
- Percy Ernst Schramm
- Julius Schreck
- Wolfgang Schreyer
- Hermann Schroeder
- Gerhard Schröder (CDU)
- Kurt Baron von Schröder
- Friedrich Bernhard von der Schulenburg
- Friedrich Werner von der Schulenburg
- Fritz-Dietlof von der Schulenburg
- Julius Schulte-Frohlinde
- Norbert Schultze
- Walther Schultze
- Paul Schultze-Naumburg
- Erwin Schulz
- Libertas Schulze-Boysen
- Richard Schulze-Kossens
- Erich Schumann
- Horst Schumann
- Otto Schumann
- Günther Schwab
- Josef Schwammberger
- Franz Xaver Schwarz
- Heinrich Schwarz
- Gustav Schwarzenegger
- Elisabeth Schwarzkopf
- Franz Schwede
- Hans Schweitzer
- Otto Scrinzi
- Herbert Scurla
- Rudolf Joachim Seck
- Hans Sedlmayr
- Siegfried Seidl
- Max Seiffert
- Franz Seldte
- Herbert Selpin
- Rudolf Sellner
- Emil Sembach
- Alexander von Senger
- Hermann Senkowsky
- Hans Joachim Sewering
- Arthur Seyß-Inquart
- Friedrich Siebert
- Ludwig Siebert
- Hermann E. Sieger
- Wolfram Sievers
- Gustav Simon
- Max Simon
- Franz Six
- Wilhelm Simon
- Otto Skorzeny
- Wolfram von Soden
- Gerhard Sommer
- Hans Sommer
- Martin Sommer
- Franz von Sonnleithner
- Duchess Sophia Charlotte of Oldenburg
- Gustav Sorge
- Richard Sorge
- Josef Spacil
- Othmar Spann
- Hugo Spatz
- Albert Speer
- Jakob Sporrenberg
- Jakob Sprenger
- Heinrich Freiherr von Stackelberg
- Sylvester Stadler
- Franz Walter Stahlecker
- Franz Stangl
- Hans Stark
- Johannes Stark
- Ludwig Steeg
- Gustav Adolf Steengracht von Moyland
- Eugen Steimle
- Otto Steinbrinck
- Felix Steiner
- Otto Steinert
- Otto Steinhäusl
- Theophil Stengel
- Ernst Stengelin
- Walther Stennes
- Ilse Stöbe
- Edmund Stoeckle
- Franz Stofel
- Franz Stöhr
- Willi Stöhr
- Hugo Stoltzenberg
- Gregor Strasser
- Otto Strasser
- Karl Straube
- Eduard Strauch
- Bruno Streckenbach
- Heinrich Strecker
- Julius Streicher
- Karl Hans Strobl
- Heinrich Karl Strohm
- Karl Strölin
- Jürgen Stroop
- Wilhelm Stuckart
- Richard Stücklen
- Ludwig Stumpfegger
- Emil Stürtz
- Franz Suchomel
- Karl Sudhoff
- Fritz Suhren
- Wilhelm Süss
- Josef Swientek
- Fritz Szepan

== T ==
- Günther Tamaschke
- Eberhard Taubert
- Oswald Teichmüller
- Otto Telschow
- Ernst Tengelmann
- Josef Terboven
- Bruno Tesch
- Wilhelm Teudt
- Adolf von Thadden
- Otto Georg Thierack
- Heinz Thilo
- Richard Thomalla
- Anton Thumann
- Bruno Thüring
- Fritz Thyssen
- Erich Timm
- Lotte Toberentz
- Fritz Todt
- Karl Toman
- Eduard Paul Tratz
- Erich Traub
- Gerdy Troost
- Alfred Trzebinski
- Hans von Tschammer und Osten
- Harald Turner

== U ==
- Ernst Udet
- Friedrich Uebelhoer
- Bodo Uhse
- Paul Uhlenhuth
- Siegfried Uiberreither

== V ==
- Theodor Vahlen
- Edmund Veesenmayer
- Willi Veller
- Otmar Freiherr von Verschuer
- Will Vesper
- Helmut Vetter
- Werner Villinger
- Carl Freiherr von Vogelsang
- Carl de Vogt
- Hans Vogt (composer)
- Heinrich Vogt (astronomer)
- Joseph Vogt
- Elisabeth Volkenrath
- Hermann Voss

== W ==
- Otto Wächter
- Fritz Wächtler
- Hilmar Wäckerle
- Otto Wagener
- Adolf Wagner
- Gerhard Wagner (physician)
- Gustav Wagner
- Josef Wagner (Gauleiter)
- Robert Heinrich Wagner
- Winifred Wagner
- Bruno Wahl
- Karl Wahl
- Ernst Wahle
- Josias, Hereditary Prince of Waldeck and Pyrmont
- Kurt Waldheim
- Ernst Waldschmidt
- Erna Wallisch
- Martin Walser
- Hertha Wambacher
- Otto-Wilhelm Wandesleben
- Felix Wankel
- Erich Wasicky
- Christian Weber (SS general)
- Friedrich Weber
- Otto Weber (theologian)
- Friedrich Wegener
- Paul Wegener
- Bernhard Wehner
- Josef Magnus Wehner
- Alfred Weidenmann
- Josef Weinheber
- Karl Weinrich
- Jakob Weiseborn
- Martin Gottfried Weiss
- Wilhelm Weiß
- Eduard Weiter
- Fritz Weitzel
- Ernst von Weizsäcker
- Richard Wendler
- Jakob Werlin
- Joachim Werner (archaeologist)
- Horst Wessel
- Paula Wessely
- Richard Wetz
- Albert Widmann
- Fritz Wiedemann
- Helmut Wielandt
- Arpad Wigand
- Karl Maria Wiligut
- Werner Willikens
- Herbert Windt
- Gertraud Winkelvoss
- Hans Winkler
- Heinz Winkler
- Johannes Winkler
- Max Winkler
- Giselher Wirsing
- Christian Wirth
- Herman Wirth
- Eduard Wirths
- Dieter Wisliceny
- Fritz Witt
- Georg Wittig
- Michael Wittmann
- Johanna Wolf
- Karl Wolff
- Kurt Wöss
- Udo von Woyrsch
- Gustav Adolf von Wulffen
- Alfred Wunderlich
- Alfred Wünnenberg
- Joachim Wünning
- Carl Wurster
- Philipp Wurzbacher
- Walther Wüst

== Y ==
- Wolfgang Yorck von Wartenburg

== Z ==
- Wilhelm Zander
- Wilhelm Zangen
- August Zehender
- Carltheo Zeitschel
- Hans Heinz Zerlett
- Adolf Ziegler
- Hans Severus Ziegler
- Joachim Ziegler
- Franz Ziereis
- Ernst Zierke
- Hermann Zilcher
- Egon Zill
- Emma Zimmer
- Ferdinand Zimmermann
- Friedrich Zimmermann
- Hans Zimmermann
- Mario Zippermayr
- Anton Zischka
- Wilhelm Zoepf
- Adolf Zutter
- Fritz Zweigelt

== Bibliography ==
- D'Almeida, Fabrice (2008). High Society in the Third Reich. Polity. ISBN 978-0745643120.
- Friedlander, Henry (1997) [1995]. The Origins of Nazi Genocide: From Euthanasia to the Final Solution. Univ. of North Carolina Press. ISBN 978-0807846759.
- Hamilton, Charles (1984). Leaders and Personalities of the Third Reich: Their Biographies, Portraits, and Autographs. R. James Bender Publishing.
- Junge, Traudl (2004). Müller, Melissa (ed.). Until the Final Hour: Hitler's Last Secretary. Arcade Publishing. ISBN 978-1559707282.
- Klee, Ernst (2007). Das Kulturlexikon zum Dritten Reich. Wer war was vor und nach 1945 (in German). Frankfurt am Main: S. Fischer. ISBN 978-3-10-039326-5.
- Klee, Ernst (2011). Das Personenlexikon zum Dritten Reich. Wer war was vor und nach 1945 (in German). Koblenz: Edition Kramer. ISBN 978-3-98114834-3.
- Langbein, Hermann (2004). People in Auschwitz. Univ of North Carolina Press. ISBN 978-0807828168.
- Prieberg, Fred K. (2009). Handbuch Deutsche Musiker 1933-1945 (in German). (CD-ROM / PDF) (2nd ed.). Oliver Kopf. ISBN 978-3000377051.
- Segev, Tom (1991). Soldiers of Evil: The Commandants of the Nazi Concentration Camps. Berkley Books. ISBN 978-0425121719.
- Snyder, Louis Leo (1998) [1976 ([New York City: McGraw-Hill)]. Encyclopedia of the Third Reich. Ware: Wordsworth Editions.
- Stockhorst, Erich (2000). 5000 Heads – Who was Who in the Third Reich. Kiel: Arndt Verlag. ISBN 3-88741-116-1.
- Wistrich, Robert S. (2001). Who's who in Nazi Germany (3rd ed.). Routledge. ISBN 0-415-26038-8.
