= Giselher Wirsing =

German journalist

Giselher Wirsing (born Max Emanuel Wirsing; April 15, 1907 – September 23, 1975) was a right-wing German journalist, author, and foreign policy expert who was active during Nazi Germany and the Bonn Republic. He was a member of the Nazi party and contributed heavily to the creation and propagation of Nazi propaganda outside Germany.

== Biography ==
=== Early life and studies ===
Max Emanuel Wirsing was the son of wealthy parents Friedrich and Pauline Wirsing. He had one sibling, an older sister. He studied at various universities, including the Ludwig-Maximilians-Universität München, the University of Königsberg, the University of Latvia, the Humboldt University of Berlin, and the University of Vienna. During this period, he changed his name to Giselher, and was involved with the right wing student association Deutsche Gildenschaft.

Beginning in 1928, Wirsing travelled through Central and Eastern Europe. He wrote about his travels in conservative magazine Die Tat. He became friends with brothers Gregor and Otto Strasser, two early members of the Nazi Party and began to associate with others in Nazi circles. He also travelled to the United States in 1930 as an associate of the Abraham Lincoln Foundation, a secret subsidiary of the Rockefeller Foundation.

He eventually completed his studies in economics at Heidelberg University in 1929, then obtained his doctorate in political science in 1931.

=== Nazi associations ===
In 1932, he published his first book Zwischeneuropa und die deutsche Zukunft ("Inter-Europe and the German future"), followed by Deutschland in der Weltpolitik ("Germany in World Politics") in 1933. He continued to write for Die Tat in association with other right-wing figures such as Hans Zehrer, Ferdinand Zimmermann, and Ernst Wilhelm Eschmann. He was made editor of Die Tat in 1933. In October 1933, at the suggestion of Heinrich Himmler, he was appointed Head of Policy at the Münchner Neueste Nachrichten ("Munich's Latest News").

Also in 1934, Wirsing became an Anwärter, or candidate, for the Schutzstaffel (SS), and began working as an informant for the Nazi intelligence agency Sicherheitsdienst (SD).

On November 1, 1938, Wirsing was promoted to the rank of Hauptsturmführer of the SS (equivalent to captain), and was made chief editor of the Münchner Neuesten Nachrichten in addition to his continuing work as editor of Die Tat (which began publishing as Das XX in 1939). He travelled to the United States in 1938. He also worked as a consultant for the cultural policy department of the Federal Foreign Office, for which he wrote anti-Bolshevik language regulations until the end of World War II.

=== Nazi party involvement and propaganda ===
Wirsing formally joined the Nazi Party in 1940. Wirsing gave a lecture at the Frankfurt opening of the Alfred Rosenberg-led Institute for Study of the Jewish Question on March 27, 1941.

He published his view of the government and culture of the United States in his 1942 book Der maßlose Kontinent (The Excessive Continent). The book contrasted the American system, which he believed was manipulated by Jewish influence, with a proposed "new world order" in the form of a German-dominated European hegemony. The book was favored by Nazi propaganda minister Joseph Goebbels, who discussed the book in his diary that year.

In 1943 Wirsing became editor of Nazi propaganda magazine Signal, later becoming its editor-in-chief in 1945. Until 1944, Wirsing wrote for the Deutsche Informationsstelle ("German Office of Information") in Berlin. The Deutsche Informationsstelle was an SS propaganda institute specializing in translations of propaganda into various European languages.

He occasionally published under the pen name Vindex, as with the 1944 French-language propaganda booklet Stalinisme: la politique sovietique pendant la deuxieme guerre mondiale ("Stalinism: Soviet politics during the Second World War"). This booklet argued that Soviet imperialism posed an immediate threat to the nations of Europe. A Swedish-language edition was also published, titled Stalinismen. Sovjetpolitiken under det andra världskriget. During the summer of 1944, the German Information Office in Stockholm distributed 7,700 copies of this booklet.

=== Egmont reports ===
By September 1944, it had become clear to some Nazi officials that both political and military defeat were impending. General Walter Schellenberg commissioned Wirsing to begin preparing reports considering potential outcomes of such a defeat, based on various sources including SD information provided to Office VI of the Reich Security Main Office. In order to preserve his anonymity and allow for purportedly-accurate reporting, the reports were signed with the name Egmont and became known as the Egmont reports. Between October 1944 and March 1945, twelve or thirteen Egmont reports were written.

=== Post-war Germany ===
Wirsing was taken prisoner in June 1945 and soon began to work as a source of information for the United States Secret Service. He undertook a study trip on its behalf through Allied-occupied Germany in 1946, although officially he remained interned. In the internment camp, he advocated making the occupied zone into the forty-ninth American state. He was interrogated by German-American lawyer Robert Kempner in December 1947.

In 1948, during the denazification process, Wirsing was classified as a Mitläufer ("follower"); in other words, a person sufficiently involved with the Nazi party that they could not simply be dismissed as uninvolved, but not so involved as to be charged with any of the war crimes of the Nazi regime. Such persons were typically fined – Wirsing was fined 2000 Reichsmarks, which was reduced to 500 on appeal.

Later that year, Wirsing co-founded conservative Evangelical Christian weekly Christ und Welt, which was an official journal of the Evangelical Church in Germany from 1949, as well as the highest-circulation weekly newspaper in the German Federal Republic until 1963. He became its editor-in-chief in 1954; despite protests from the Social Democratic Party of Germany, including politicians Herbert Wehner and Willy Brandt, he held that position until 1970.

In 1967, German magazine Der Spiegel reported that Wirsing had demanded the "violent elimination of the Jewish element" in the fourth edition of Der maßlose Kontinent, printed in 1943, which they argued had contributed to the "expediency of Auschwitz" and therefore implicating Wirsing in Nazi war crimes. Wirsing threatened Der Spiegel with legal action.

On April 16, 1959, Wirsing published an article in Christ und Welt which described a man he felt was "a second Albert Schweitzer" working in a remote area of Ghana, in West Africa. The man he was describing was actually the Nazi doctor and SS officer Horst Schumann, then a fugitive; he was extradited to Germany in 1966 to be prosecuted for Nazi war crimes.

== Personal life ==
Giselher Wirsing was married twice. His first wife was Ellen Rösler, with whom he had two daughters, including journalist Sibylle Wirsing. His second wife was publicist Gisela Bonn. Bonn and Wirsing wrote several books together.

== Bibliography ==
=== As author ===
- Zwischeneuropa und die deutsche Zukunft. 1932
- Deutschland in der Weltpolitik. 1933
- Köpfe der Weltpolitik. Knorr & Hirth, München 1934
- Das Königreich Südslawien (in collaboration with Gerhard Gesemann, Egon Heymann, Josef März, Friedrich Wilhelm von Oertzen, Alois Schmaus, Hans Schwab, France Stele). Robert Noske, Leipzig 1935
- Engländer, Juden, Araber in Palästina. 1938, 1939 & reissued in 1942
- Hundert Familien beherrschen das Empire, for the Deutschen Informationsstelle. Ohne Verlag, Berlin 1940.
- Der maßlose Kontinent. Roosevelts Kampf um die Weltherrschaft, Diederichs, Jena 1942
- Das Zeitalter des Ikaros. Von Gesetz und Grenzen unseres Jahrhunderts. 1944
- Die Politik des Ölflecks. Der Sowjetimperialismus im zweiten Weltkrieg Deutscher Verlag, 1944 (under the pseudonym Vindex)
- Schritt aus dem Nichts. Perspektiven am Ende der Revolutionen. 1951
- Sozialgeschichte der industriellen Arbeitswelt, ihrer Krisenformen und Gestaltungsversuche (with Ernst Michel), 1953
- Die Rückkehr des mondo-mogo. Afrika von morgen. 1954
- Die Menschenlawine. Der Bevölkerungszuwachs als weltpolitisches Problem. Reihe: Fragen an der Zeit 3. Deutsche Verlagsanstalt, 1956
- Indien, Asiens gefährliche Jahre. 1968, erw. Aufl. 1972 & 1982
  - in Englisch: The Indian Experiment. Key to Asia's Future. Orient Longman, New Delhi 1972
- Staat und Wirtschaft im Kommunismus in der Sicht seiner 'Häretiker', unter besonderer Berücksichtigung von Milovan Djilas. In: Walter-Raymond-Stiftung (Hg.): Eigentum, Wirtschaft, Fortschritt. Zur Ordnungsfunktion des privaten Produktiveigentums. Jakob Hegner, Köln 1970
- Der abwendbare Untergang. Die Herausforderung an Menschen und Mächte. 1975
- Indien und der Subkontinent. Indien, Pakistan, Bangladesh, Nepal, Sikkim, Bhutan (with Gisela Bonn), 1984

=== As editor ===
- Der Krieg 1939/41 in Karten (in collaboration with: Albrecht Haushofer, Wolfgang Höpker, Fritz Meurer, Horst Michael), Knorr & Hirth, München 1940, 2. Aufl. 1942 (Reprinted Melchior Hiedsby torischer Verlag 2008)
- Indo Asia (on behalf of the German-Indian Society), UT: Vierteljahreshefte für Politik, Kultur und Wirtschaft Indiens. Seit Jan. 1961: Jg. 1960 – Jg. 1968. Selbstverlag der Gesellschaft
- Das 20. Jahrhundert. Monatsschrift. (with Ernst Wilhelm Eschmann) Diederichs, Jena.
