= Spáčil =

Spáčil (feminine Spáčilová) is a Czech surname. Notable people with the surname include:

- Branislav Spáčil (born 2003), Slovak footballer
- Josef Spacil, Nazi German military officer
- Kamila Spáčilová (born 1988), Czech volleyball player
