= List of Nazis (F–K) =

A list of notable people who were at some point a member of the defunct Nazi Party (NSDAP). This is not meant to be a list of every person who was ever a member of the Nazi Party. This is a list of notable figures who were active within the party and did something significant within it that is of historical note or who were members of the Nazi Party according to multiple reliable publications. For a list of the main leaders and most important party figures see: List of Nazi Party leaders and officials.

Overview A–E F–K L–R S–Z

== F ==
- Arnold Fanck
- Gottfried Feder
- Hermann Fegelein
- Heinrich Fehlis
- Lothar Fendler
- Rudolf Fernau
- Roderich Fick
- Fidus
- Karl Fiehler
- Gerhard Fieseler
- Hans Filbinger
- August von Finck, Sr.
- Wolfgang Finkelnburg
- Hans Fischböck
- Eugen Fischer
- Franz Joseph Emil Fischer
- Fritz Fischer (historian)
- Fritz Fischer (medical doctor)
- Ludwig Fischer
- Josef Fitzthum
- Hans Fleischhacker
- Ulrich Fleischhauer
- Rudolf Fleischmann
- Gerhard Flesch
- Friedrich Flick
- Friedrich Karl Florian
- Hermann Florstedt
- Otto Förschner
- Werner Forßmann
- Albert Forster
- Theodor Förster
- Ernst Forsthoff
- Wolfgang Fortner
- Hans Frank
- Karl Hermann Frank
- August Frank
- Walter Frank
- Kurt Franz
- Max Frauendorfer
- Alfred Frauenfeld
- Oswald Freisler
- Roland Freisler
- Fritz Freitag
- Karl Frenzel
- Albert Frey (SS officer)
- Erik Frey
- Wilhelm Frick
- Prince Friedrich Christian of Schaumburg-Lippe
- Helmuth Friedrichs
- Willy Fritsch
- Karl Fritzsch
- Gert Fröbe
- Carl Froelich
- Erich Fuchs
- Wilhelm Fuchs
- Walther Funk
- Ferdinand aus der Fünten

== G ==
- Fritz Gajewski
- Albert Ganzenmüller
- Heinrich Gattineau
- Hermann Gauch
- Edwin Gebauer
- Karl Gebhardt
- Arnold Gehlen
- Willi Geiger (judge)
- Hans-Dietrich Genscher
- Gerhard Gentzen
- Karl Genzken
- Achim Gercke
- Herbert Gerigk
- Karl Gerland
- Kurt Gerstein
- Kurt Gerstenberg
- Wilhelm Gideon
- Gustav Giemsa
- Hermann Giesler
- Paul Giesler
- Kurt Gildisch
- Herbert Otto Gille
- Ernst Girzick
- Hans Bernd Gisevius
- Edmund Glaise von Horstenau
- Fridolin Glass
- Odilo Globocnik
- Richard Glücks
- Joseph Goebbels
- Magda Goebbels
- Alexander Golling
- Alfons Goppel
- Emmy Göring
- Hermann Göring
- Amon Göth
- Curt von Gottberg
- Josef Goubeau
- Maximilian Grabner
- Paul Graener
- Siegfried Graetschus
- Ulrich Graf
- Hermann Grapow
- Ernst-Robert Grawitz
- Ulrich Greifelt
- Josef Greindl
- Arthur Greiser
- Irma Grese
- Wilhelm Grewe
- Friedrich Griese
- Jakob Grimminger
- Josef Grohé
- Oskar Gröning,
- Heinrich Gross
- Walter Gross
- Alfred Großrock
- Franz Grothe
- Kurt Gruber
- Walter Grundmann
- Adam Grünewald
- Günter Guillaume
- Otto Günsche
- Hans F. K. Günther
- Rolf Günther
- Wilhelm Gustloff
- Erich Gutenberg

== H ==
- Werner Haase
- Theodor Habicht
- Lorenz Hackenholt
- Eugen Hadamovsky
- Harry Haffner
- Ludwig Hahn
- Julius Hallervorden
- Karl Ritter von Halt
- Joachim Hamann
- Ernst Hanfstaengl
- Karl Hanke
- Thea von Harbou
- Otto Harder
- Arvid Harnack
- Heinrich Harrer
- Wilhelm Harster
- Fritz Hartjenstein
- Johannes Hassebroek
- Ulrich von Hassell
- Jakob Wilhelm Hauer
- Paul Hausser
- Emil Haussmann
- Franz Hayler
- Richard von Hegener
- Martin Heidegger
- Erhard Heiden
- Aribert Heim
- Heinrich Heim
- Karl-Günther Heimsoth
- Edmund Heines
- Ernst Heinkel
- Hans Heinze
- August Heißmeyer
- Kurt Heißmeyer
- Wolf-Heinrich Graf von Helldorf
- Otto Hellmuth
- Otto Hellwig
- Hans Helwig
- Konrad Henlein
- Wilhelm Henning
- Willibald Hentschel
- Nikolaus Herbet
- Maximilian von Herff
- Gottlieb Hering
- Albert Herrmann
- Rudolf Heß
- Prince Christoph of Hesse
- Walther Hewel
- Erich von der Heyde
- Werner Heyde
- Lina Heydrich
- Reinhard Heydrich
- Eduard von der Heydt
- Friedrich August von der Heydte
- Konstantin Hierl
- Dieter Hildebrandt
- Friedrich Hildebrandt
- Richard Hildebrandt
- Erich Hilgenfeldt
- Ernst Hermann Himmler
- Gebhard Ludwig Himmler
- Heinrich Himmler
- Margarete Himmler
- Hans Hinkel
- Fritz Hippler
- August Hirt
- Adolf Hitler
- Karl-Friedrich Höcker
- Franz Hofer
- Werner Höfer
- Hermann Höfle
- Hermann Höfle (SS general)
- Otto Höfler (Germanist)
- Albert Hoffmann
- Heinrich Hoffmann
- Otto Hofmann
- Ludwig Hohlwein
- Walter Höllerer
- Hans Egon Holthusen
- Karl Holz
- Eugen Hönig
- Paul-Werner Hoppe
- Heinrich Hörlein
- Rudolf Höß
- Franz Hössler
- Wilhelm Höttl
- Waldemar Hoven
- Franz Josef Huber
- Adolf Hühnlein
- Sigrid Hunke
- Walter Huppenkothen
- Hans Hüttig

== I ==
- Max Ilgner
- Fritz Emil Irrgang
- Alfred Ittner

== J ==
- Georg Jacoby
- Emil Jaeger
- Friedrich Gustav Jaeger
- Karl Jäger
- Erich Jahn
- Franz Jakob
- Gerhart Jander
- Herbert Jankuhn
- Herbert Janssen
- Friedrich Jeckeln
- Walter Jens
- Georg Ludwig Jochum
- Hanns Johst
- Georg Joos
- Oskar Joost
- Pascual Jordan
- Rudolf Jordan
- Heinz Jost
- Philipp Wilhelm Jung
- Rudolf Jung
- Hugo Jury
- Hans Jüttner
- Phil Jutzi

== K ==
- Oswald Kaduk
- Karl Kahr
- Anton Kaindl
- Ernst Kaltenbrunner
- Hans Kammler
- Arthur Kampf
- Herbert von Karajan
- Wilhelm Karpenstein
- Siegfried Kasche
- Fritz Katzmann
- Karl Kaufmann
- Erich Kempka
- Wilhelm Keppler
- Erich Kern
- Hanns Kerrl
- Emil Ketterer
- Walter von Keudell
- Erich Keyser
- Kurt Georg Kiesinger
- Manfred Freiherr von Killinger
- Emil Kirdorf
- Hans Helmut Kirst
- Gerhard Kittel
- Dietrich Klagges
- Hubert Klausner
- Josef Klehr
- Eugen Klöpfer
- Gerhard Klopfer
- Gustav Knittel
- Helmut Knochen
- Fritz Knöchlein
- Franz Knoop
- Erich Koch
- Hans-Karl Koch
- Ilse Koch
- Karl-Otto Koch
- Max Koegel
- Anneliese Kohlmann
- Walter Köhler
- Erwin Guido Kolbenheyer
- Werner Kollath
- Josef Kollmer
- Max Kommerell
- Franz Konrad (SS officer)
- Horst Kopkow
- Walter Kopp
- Wilhelm Koppe
- Erich Kordt
- Viktor de Kowa
- Hugo Kraas
- Waldemar Kraft
- Josef Kramer
- Fritz Kranefuss
- Carl Krauch
- Erwin Kraus
- Albert Krebs
- Hans Krebs (SS general)
- Johann Kremer
- Peter Kreuder
- Ernst Krieck
- Friedrich Wilhelm Kritzinger
- Karl Krolow
- Carl Vincent Krogmann
- Bernhard Krüger
- Friedrich-Wilhelm Krüger
- Gerhard Krüger
- Hans Krüger, SS-Hauptsturmführer
- Hans Krüger, Oberamtsrichter
- Gustav Krukenberg
- Alfried Krupp von Bohlen und Halbach
- Gustav Krupp von Bohlen und Halbach
- Wilhelm Kube
- Kurt Kühme
- Hans Kühne
- Werner Kuhnt
- Richard Kunze
- Franz Kutschera
- Walter Kutschmann
- Kurt Küttner

== Bibliography ==
- Klee, Ernst: Das Personenlexikon zum Dritten Reich. Wer war was vor und nach 1945. Fischer Taschenbuch Verlag, Zweite aktualisierte Auflage, Frankfurt am Main 2005 ISBN 978-3-596-16048-8
- Klee, Ernst Das Kulturlexikon zum Dritten Reich. Wer war was vor und nach 1945. S. Fischer, Frankfurt am Main 2007 ISBN 978-3-10-039326-5
- Longerich, Peter (2012). Heinrich Himmler: A Life. Oxford; New York: Oxford University Press. ISBN 978-0-19-959232-6.
- Snyder, Louis Leo, Encyclopedia of the Third Reich, Ware: Wordsworth Editions, 1998 (originally published New York City: McGraw-Hill, 1976)
- Stockhorst, Erich (1985). 5000 Köpfe: Wer War Was im 3. Reich. Arndt. ISBN 978-3-887-41116-9.
- Wistrich, Robert S. (2001). Who's who in Nazi Germany (3 ed.). Routledge. ISBN 0-415-26038-8.
