= Eschmann =

Eschmann may refer to:

- Ernst Wilhelm Eschmann (1904-1987), sociologist, writer and playwright
- Fritz Eschmann (1909-1997), German politician
- Eschmann introducer used to facilitate tracheal intubation
