= Achterberg (surname) =

Achterberg is a surname. Notable people with the surname include:

- Chantal Achterberg (born 1985), Dutch rower
- Eberhard Achterberg (1910–1983), German religious scholar
- Eddy Achterberg (born 1947), Dutch footballer and coach
- Fritz Achterberg (1880–1971), German actor
- Gerd Achterberg (1940–2025), German football manager
- Gerrit Achterberg (1905–1962), Dutch poet
- Giorgio Achterberg (born 1990), Dutch footballer
- Jeanne Achterberg (1942–2012), American psychologist
- John Achterberg (born 1971), Dutch footballer

== See also ==
- Agterberg
