= Stalinism (disambiguation) =

Stalinism is a theory and practice for developing a communist society.

Stalinism may also refer to:

- Marxism–Leninism, the state ideology of the Soviet Union developed by Stalin
- Neo-Stalinism, the posthumous promotion of Stalin and his political theory
- Stalinism (EP), 1981 EP by The Stalin
- Stalinism (album), 1987 compilation album by The Stalin
- Stalinist architecture, the architecture of the Soviet Union under the leadership of Stalin

== See also ==
- Stalin, alias of Ioseb Besarionis dzе Jughashvili
- Stalinisme, 1944 French-language booklet by Vindex (Giselher Wirsing)
- Stalin Society, a British pro-Stalin discussion group
