= Karl Abt =

Karl Abt may refer to:

- Karl Friedrich Abt (1743–1783), German actor.
- Karl Abt (painter) (1899–1985), German painter
- Karl Ferdinand Abt (1903–1945), German politician
- Carl Roman Abt (1850–1933), Swiss engineer
