= Die Tat =

Defunct German political magazine

Die Tat (The Deed or The Action) was a German monthly publication of politics and culture. It was founded in April 1909 and its publisher (from 1912 on) was Eugen Diederichs from Jena. From 1939 until 1944 Die Tat was continued as Das XX. Jahrhundert.

== 1909–1912 ==
The magazine was founded by the freemason Ernst Horneffer. It had the subtitle Wege zu freiem Menschentum, which in this case would be that of a Nietzsche-man.

== 1912–1928 ==
In October 1912 Eugen Diederichs took control of the magazine, which at that point had only a distribution of about 1,000. The content would change, and from now on it would sport the subtitle Eine sozial-religiöse Monatsschrift, later changed to Sozial-religiöse Monatsschrift für deutsche Kultur. Again, in 1921 Diederichs would change the title of Die Tat, implying another change of viewership and ideology: Die Tat. Monatsschrift für die Zukunft deutscher Kultur.

== 1928–1929 ==
In 1928 Diederichs transferred editorial control of Die Tat to the writer Adam Kuckhoff (who was later executed by the Nazis). This would only last shortly. The magazine would be restyled however, getting the subtitle Monatsschrift zur Gestaltung neuer Wirklichkeit.

== 1929–1933 ==
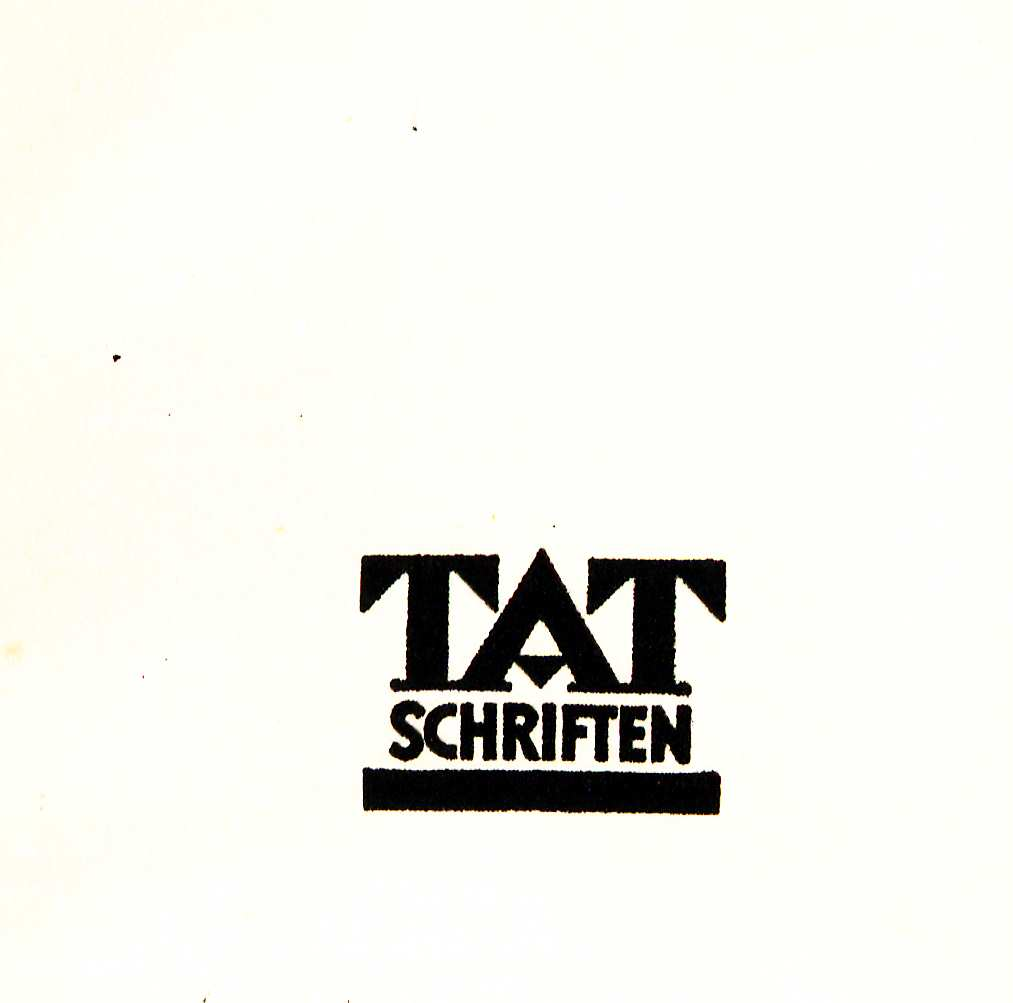
Tat Schriften (1931)

Hans Zehrer would become (unofficial) chief editor of Die Tat in September 1929 (now subtitled as Unabhängig Monatsschrift zur Gestaltung neuer Wirklichkeit), and would together with Ernst Wilhelm Eschmann, Ferdinand Fried and Giselher Wirsing make Die Tat into an influential promoter of the Tatkreis and the Conservative Revolutionary movement. In a short time the circulation of the magazine would rise to 30,000, attracting mostly a middle-class populace, and becoming a front-runner of the Nazi propaganda machine with the magazine's stress on autarky, nationalism, and anti-capitalistic tendencies. It also provided a front for Kurt von Schleicher, when Die Tat took control of the Berlin paper Tägliche Rundschau in 1932.

== 1933–1939 ==
In 1933 the Nazis took control of the publication and Giselher Wirsing would become its main editor, changing the subtitle of the magazine to Unabhängige Monatsschrift in 1934. The last subtitle change of the magazine occurred in 1936, fittingly it was now to be named the Deutsche Monatsschrift.

== See also ==
- Tatkreis
