= Psychro Cave =

Minoan sacred cave on Crete

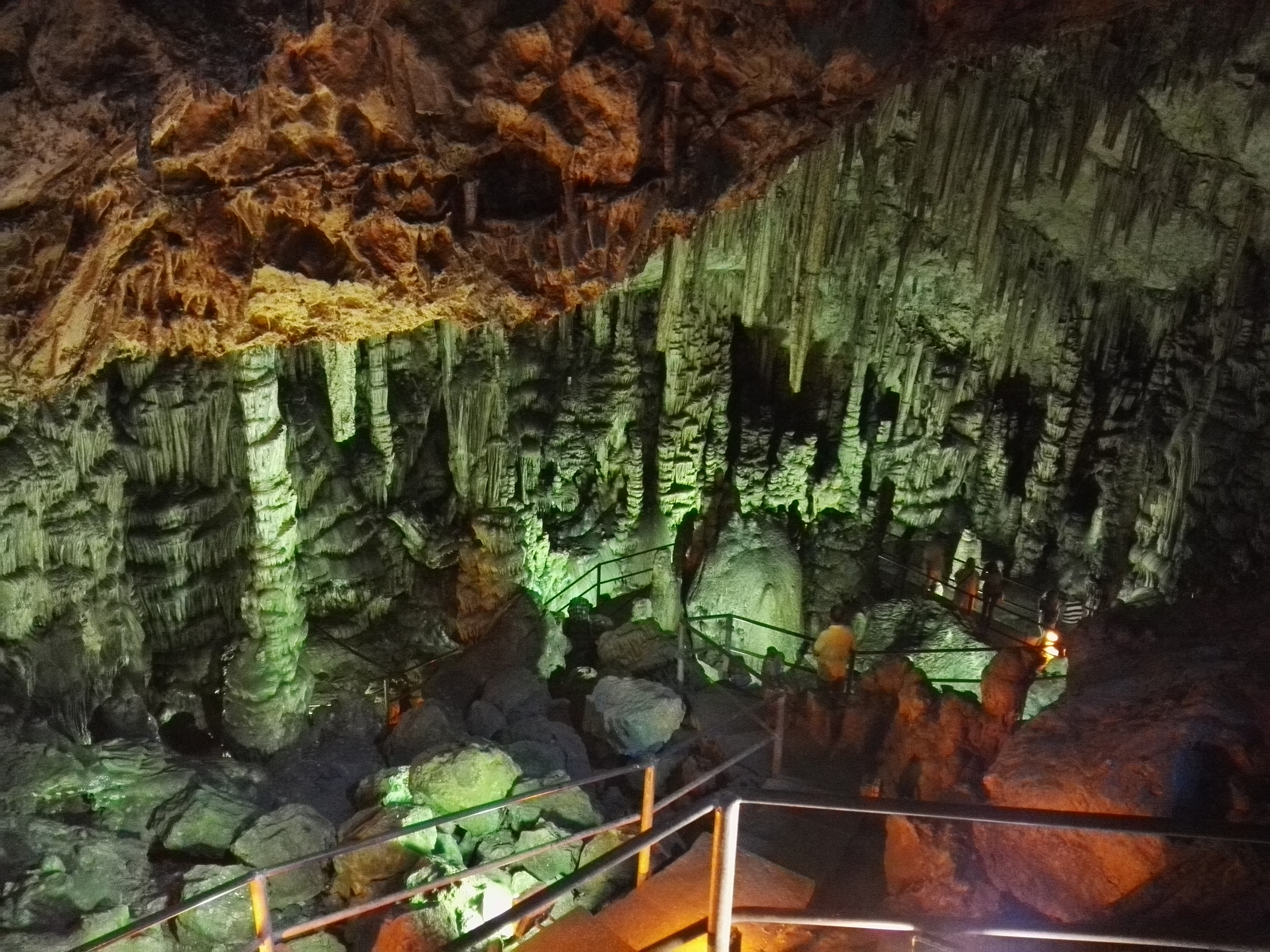
- Floodlit stalagmites and stalactites in the cave’s interior

- Location within Greece
- Location: Crete, Greece
- Coordinates: 35.1629°N 25.4451°E

Psychro Cave (Greek: Σπήλαιο Ψυχρού) is an ancient Minoan sacred cave in the Lasithi plateau in the Lasithi district of eastern Crete. Around the beginning of 20th century, several scholars identified Psychro with Dikte, a name used by some ancient authors to refer to the location of Zeus's upbringing. Multiple subsequent scholars have disagreed with this theory; Mieke Prent, writing in 2005, describes it as probably incorrect.

== Geography ==
The cave is located in the prefecture of Lasithi. In Minoan times, the town of Malia was the closest metropolitan center.

== Identification with Dikte ==
Multiple ancient accounts describe the location of Zeus's upbringing as "Dikte", a toponym that variously referred to either a cave, mountain, or the site of a sanctuary. In the 2nd-century AD mythographer Apollodorus's version, Zeus's mother Rhea gave birth to him in a cave on Mount Dikte, where he was then reared by two nymphs on the milk of the goat Amalthea. Others authors that placed the god's birth there include Diodorus Siculus and Agathocles. Apollonius of Rhodes seemingly conflated Dikte with Ida – another place where Zeus was purportedly raised – locating Zeus's upbringing at both. The location given by Hesiod in his Theogony (8th or 7th century BC) was a cave on Mount Aegaeon.

Although the location to which "Dikte" refers has been debated since antiquity, modern scholarship has reached a general agreement that Dikte was situated in eastern Crete. Several scholars operating around the beginning of the 20th century, including two of the site's excavators, Arthur Evans and David George Hogarth, identified the Diktaian Cave with Psychro. This suggestion attracted disagreement from several other scholars in the early 20th century, including Wolfgang Aly, Karl Julius Beloch, and Jules Toutain. In 1988, Charles Crowther argued that Dikte should instead be identified with the region of Palaikastro. He posited that the sanctuary of Dikte was a sanctuary at Palaikastro (which most scholars believe was dedicated to Diktaian Zeus), and that Mount Dikte was the nearby mountain of Petsofas.

In 21st century, Mieke Prent has written that the identification of Dikte and Psychro is most likely incorrect. Joseph A. MacGillivray and Hugh Sackett have called Crowther's hypothesis "quite likely", and William D. Furley and Jan Maarten Bremer have described it as "virtually certain". Prent and John Boardman (the latter writing in 1961) have remarked that an identification of Psychro with the cave on Mount Aegaeon mentioned by Hesiod is possible, however.

== Archaeology ==
The cave was first excavated in 1886 by Joseph Hatzidakis, President of the Syllogos at Candia, and F. Halbherr. In 1896, Sir Arthur Evans investigated the site.

In 1898 Pierre Demargne conducted brief investigations, followed by David George Hogarth of the British School at Athens in 1900 who carried out more extensive operations. Hogarth's reports published in 1900 give a picture of the destruction wrought by primitive archaeological methods: immense fallen blocks from the upper cave roof were blasted before removal; the rich black earth had been previously ransacked. The stuccoed altar in the upper cave was discovered in 1900, surrounded by strata of ashes, pottery and "other refuse", among which were votive objects in bronze, terracotta, iron and bone, with fragments of some thirty libation tables and countless conical ceramic cups for food offerings. Bones among the ash layer attest to sacrifice of bulls, sheep and goats, deer and a boar.

The undisturbed lowest strata of the upper cave represented the transition between Late Minoan Kamares ware to earliest Mycenaean levels; finds represented the Geometric Style of the ninth century BCE, but few later than that. More recent excavation has revealed the use of the cave reached back to Early Minoan times, and votive objects attest to the cave's being the most frequented shrine by Middle Minoan times (MM IIIA).

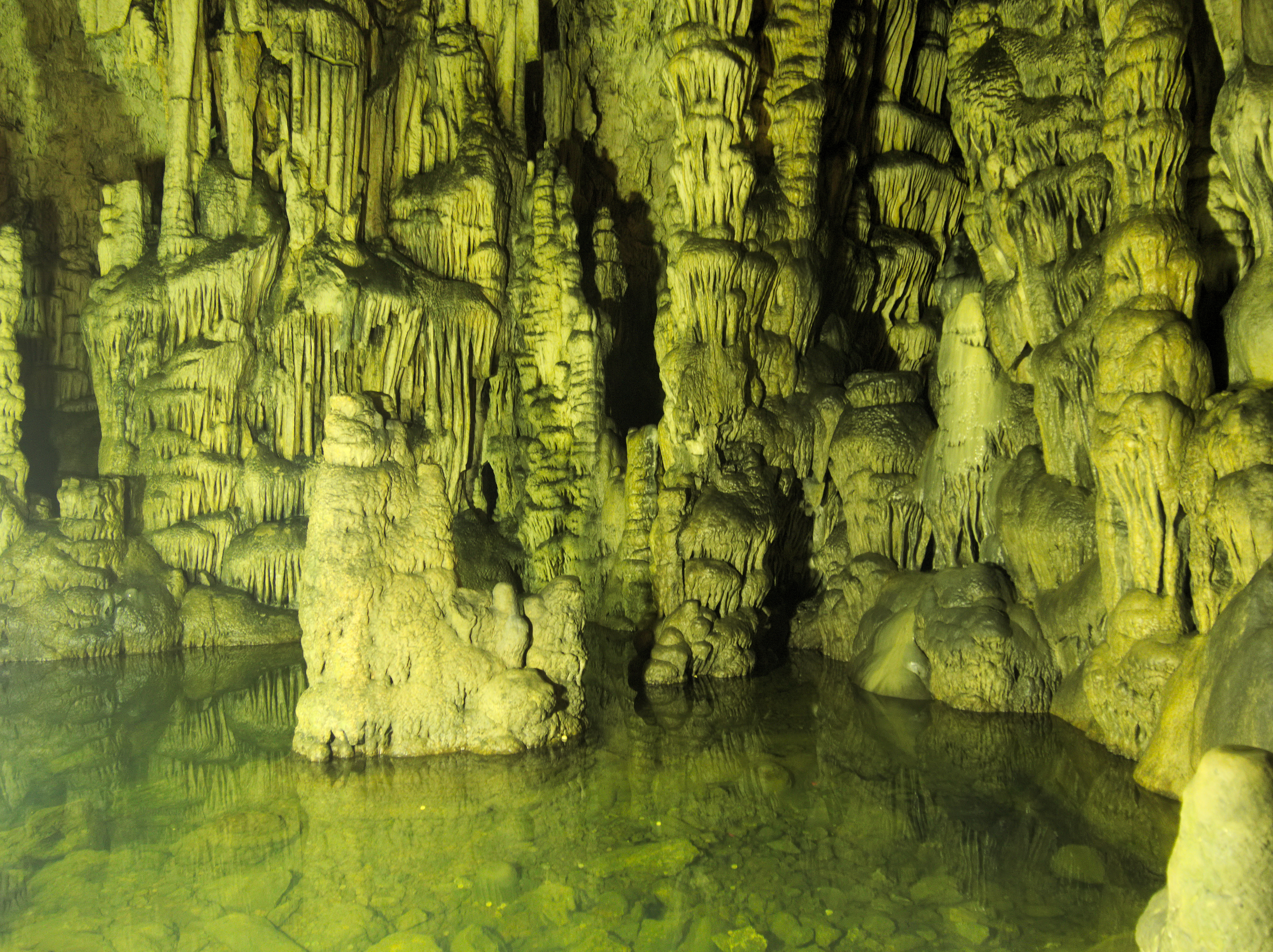
The water pool

The lower grotto falls steeply with traces of a rock-cut stair to a pool, out of which stalactites rise. "Much earth had been thrown down by diggers of the Upper Grotto," Hogarth reported, "and this was found full of small bronze objects." In the vertical chinks of the lowest stalactites, Hogarth's team found "toy double-axes, knife-blades, needles, and other objects in bronze, placed there by dedicators, as in niches. The mud at the edge of the subterranean pool was also rich in similar things and in statuettes of two types, male and female and engraved gems."

In 1961, Boardman published the finds uncovered by these and other excavations.

While clay human figurines are normally found in peak sanctuaries, Psychro and the sanctuary on Mount Ida stand out as the only sacred caves that have yielded human figurines. Psychro is also a unique sacred cave for a bronze leg, also known as a votive body part, which is the only votive body part to be found in a sacred cave. More common sacred cave finds at Psychro include stone and ceramic lamps.

Psychro yielded an uncommon number of semi-precious stones, including carnelian, steatite, amethyst, jasper and hematite.

Psychro's artefacts are now on display at the Heraklion Museum, the Ashmolean Museum in Oxford, the Louvre and the British Museum.
