= Gustav Abb =

German Nazi librarian (1886–1945)

Gustav Abb (23 February 1886 in Berlin – 28 April 1945) was a German Nazi librarian.

== Career ==
Abb was the son of Wilhelm Abb, a Geheimrat, one of the highest of ranking officials in the Imperial Court of the Holy Roman Empire. Abb studied history, German Studies, and philosophy at Freiburg im Breisgau and Berlin. He received his doctorate in 1911 from the Friedrich-Wilhelms-Universität, now known as the Humboldt University of Berlin. His thesis was written on the history of the Chorin Cloisters (Geschichte des Klosters Chorin) in Brandenburg. That same year, he began working as a trainee at the Greifswald University Library. He went on to become an assistant at Göttingen State and University Library.

From 1921 to 1925 he was Chairman of the Prussian Library Affairs Advisory Council. In 1923 he became library director of the Prussian State Library.

He joined the Nazi Party in 1933 after the party's rise to power and in 1935 he became director of the University Library in Berlin.

From 1937 he was chairman of the Association of German Librarians (VDB). In the year after the Anschluss, on 30 May 1939 he declared in the opening speech at the annual meeting of the VDB in Graz, paying homage to Adolf Hitler, he praised him as the creator and expander of the German Reich.

During World War II, Abb was given the rank of SS-Sturmbannführer and deployed in July 1940 as head of the central administration of the libraries (Leiter der Hauptverwaltung der Bibliotheken) in occupied Poland. He was also a member of the Einsatzstab Reichsleiter Rosenberg. After the German attack and invasion on the Soviet Union in 1941, he was made commissioner for the protection of libraries in the ERR, an organization responsible for looting libraries and archives.

“…From the very beginning of the establishment of the Staatsbibliothek Krakau, special importance was given to materials related to the natural sciences, mathematics, geography and medicine. In the fiscal year 1940-1941, the amount of money spent on book purchases was surpringly high.” The Germans recognized the value of the scientific collection, and from 1941 through 1944, 35,599 books were borrowed by 2,621 patrons, mostly German civil servants and military personnel. Polish civilians were not allowed access to the library during the occupation. Gustav Abb, the German overseer of libraries, decided to send much of the reference collection to Germany in 1944. “Abb decided to send the major part of the reference collection, as well as most of the books bought by the Staatsbibliothek to Germany (altogether about 25,000 volumes). [Polish] Librarians, charged with the task of filling boxes with books, tried to sabotage Abb’s orders. They hid a large number of books and stuffed boxes with old newspapers. Despite those heroic efforts to save the collection, the Germans were still able to send a great number of books to Adelsdorf (Adelin) in Silesia. After the war, the library was able to recover most of the books that Abb had evacuated from the library.” Later in the war, the main reading room was used as sleeping quarters for German soldiers, and other parts of the library were used as a hospital for Germans.

He was killed in 1945.

In the Soviet Zone of Occupation, his primary book in Library Science, the Scientific Librarian (Der wissenschaftliche Bibliothekar), was proscribed.

== Publications ==
- Abb, Gustav. Aus fünfzig Jahren deutscher Wissenschaft. Die Entwicklung ihrer Fachgebiete in Einzeldarstellungen. Edited by Gustav Abb. Berlin, DE Gryuter, 1930.
- Abb, Gustav, Georg Leyh, and Fritz Milkau. 1933. Bibliotheksverwaltung: bearb. von Gustav Abb. Leipzig: Harrassowitz.
- Abb, Gustav, and Gottfried Wentz. 1929. Das Bistum Brandenburg. Berlin: De Gruyter. "Fotomechanischer Nachdruck 1963." Description: 416 p. 26 cm. Series Title: Germania Sacra., 1. Abt.; Die Bistümer der Kirchenprovinz Magdeburg, 1.
- Abb, Gustav. 1928. Von Büchern und Bibliotheken: dem ersten Direktor der Preussischen Staatsbibliothek geheimen Regierungsrat dr. phil. Ernst Kuhnert als Abschiedsgabe dargebracht von seinen Freunden und Mitarbeitern. Berlin: Verlag von Struppe & Winckler.
- Abb, Gustav. 1911. Geschichte des Klosters Chorin. Berlin: [M. Warneck]. "Diese Arbeit erscheint ausserdem im Jahrbuch fur brandenburgische Kurchengeschichte, Jahrgang 7 u. 8, hrsg. von Nikolaus Müller, und als Sonderdruck im Kommissionsverlag von Martin Warneck, Berlin."
- Abb, Gustav. 1926. Schleiermachers Reglement für die Königliche Bibliothek zu Berlin vom Jahre 1813: und seine Vorgeschichte. Berlin: M. Breslauer. "Dem scheidenden Generaldirektor ... Fritz Milkau dargebracht von der Preussischen Staatsbibliothek." Dedication signed: Kuhnert.
- Abb, Gustav. 1934. Fritz Milkau zum Gedächtnis; Ansprachen, Vorträge und Verzeichnis seiner Schriften. Leipzig: O. Harrassowitz. Description: 3 p. L., 9-[55] p. front. (port.). Contents: Ansprachen bei der trauerfeier am 29, januar 1934, von E. Seeberg, II. A. Krüss und G. Leyh.--Vorträge bei der gedenkfeier am 27, februar 1934 : Einleitende worte, von II. A. Krüss. Persönliche erinnerungen an Milkau, von F. Schmidt-Ott. Milkau als mensch und biblothekar, von E. Kuhnert. Milkan als kommissar für die belgischen bibliotheken und als bibliotheksdirektor in Breslau, von R. Oehler. Milkau als lehrer, von N. Fischer. Milkaus literarisches lebenswerk, von G. Abb. Verzelchnis der schriften Milkaus, zusammengestelit von C. Balcke.
- Abb, Gustav. 1932. Vom deutschen und vom internationalen Leihverkehr [Vortr.]. [Berlin NW 7, Unter d. Linden 38]: [Dir. G. Abb]. Aus: Atti del 1. Congresso mondiale delle Biblioteche e di Bibliografia. Roma-Venezia 15-30 giugno 1929. Vol. 5.
- Abb, Gustav. 1937. Die Einführung der täglichen Ausleihe in der Berliner Kgl. Bibliothek. [Berlin]: [s. n.]. Aus: Mélanges offerts à M. Marcel Godet.
- Abb, Gustav, Fritz Milkau, and Friedrich Schleiermacher. 1926. Schleiermachers Reglement für die Königliche Bibliothek zu Berlin vom Jahre 1813 und seine Vorgeschichte: dem scheidenden Generaldirektor geheimen Regierungsrat Fritz Milkau dargebracht von der Preussischen Staatsbibliothek. Berlin: Breslauer. Der Druck erfolgte für Martin Breslauer in Berlin durch Oskar Bonde in Altenburg im Jahre 1925. Es wurden 330 gezählte Abzüge hergestellt, davon Nr. 1–30 in einer Vorzugsausgabe auf Japanpapier.
- Abb, Gustav. 1939. Der wissenschafltiche Bibliothekar. Series Title: Die akademischen Berufe. Responsibility: hrsg. vom Akad. Auskunstsamt Berlin in Verb. mit d. Amt f. Berufserziehung und Betriebsführung in d. Dt. Arbeitsfront. [Gustav Abb].
- Milkau, Fritz, Hans Schnorr von Carolsfeld, Gustav Abb, Aloys Bömer, and Friedrich Bräuninger. n.d. Handbuch der Bibliothekswissenschaft 0. Besitzerspezifische Fußnote. Leipzig: Harrassowitz.
- Abb, Gustav. 1931. Die Bedeutung der Photocopie für die Staatsbibliothek. [Berlin SW 61]: [Photo Copie]. (Ausz. aus e. Rede, anl. d. Pressebesichtigg d. Abt. Photocopie).
- Abb, Gustav. 1927. Die Preußische Staatsbibliothek, Berlin 1927. [s. l.]: [s. n.].
- Abb, Gustav. 1937. Wu shi nian lai de Deguo xue shu. 五十年來的德國學術. Shanghai: Shang wu yin shu guan. China Maxx.

== See also ==
- List of Nazi Party members
