= Friedrich Bolte =

German politician

Friedrich Bolte (born 7 December 1896 in Schaapsen, Gemeinde Ochtmannien; died 23 November 1959 in Neubruchhausen, Landkreis Diepholz) was a German politician. He joined the Nazi Party (NSDAP) in 1933.

== See also ==
- List of Nazi Party members
