= Agterberg =

Agterberg is a Dutch surname. Notable people with the surname include:

- Cesco Agterberg (born 1975), Dutch football coach
- Cris Agterberg (1883–1948), Dutch artist and ceramicist
- Frits Agterberg (born 1936), Dutch geologist

== See also ==
- Achterberg (surname)
