= Wolfgang Yorck von Wartenburg =

German politician

Kreisleiter of Oels
- In office July 1930 – March 1933

Lower Silesia Provincial Parliament Deputy
- In office March 1933 – 14 October 1933

Reichstag Deputy
- In office 12 November 1933 – 29 March 1936

Personal details
- Born: Hans Ludwig David Viktor Wolfgang Graf Yorck von Wartenburg; 9 September 1899 Schleibitz, German Empire
- Died: 12 September 1944 (aged 45) Bonnal, Doubs France
- Party: Nazi Party
- Education: Ludwig-Maximilians-Universität München; University of Königsberg; Friedrich Wilhelm University of Berlin
- Nickname: "Wolf"

Military service
- Allegiance: German Empire; Nazi Germany
- Branch/service: Royal Prussian Army; German Army
- Years of service: 1917–1918; 1944
- Rank: Leutnant; Major
- Unit: 1st (Silesian) Life Cuirassiers "Great Elector"
- Battles/wars: World War I World War II

Hans Ludwig David Viktor Wolfgang ("Wolf") Graf Yorck von Wartenburg (9 September 1899 – 12 September 1944) was a German aristocrat who became a politician in the Nazi Party and was elected to the provincial and national parliaments. Serving as an officer in the German army, he was killed in action in France during the Second World War.

== Early life and education ==
Yorck von Wartenburg was born to an aristocratic Prussian family at Schleibitz in Silesia (today, Śliwice, Lower Silesian Voivodeship in Poland). After earning his Abitur in 1917 at Liegnitz (today, Legnica), he fought in the First World War from the summer of 1917 to November 1918 with the 1st (Silesian) Life Cuirassiers "Great Elector". After the war ended, he was discharged with the rank of Leutnant of reserves. He then studied agriculture and law at the Ludwig-Maximilians-Universität München, the University of Königsberg, and the Friedrich Wilhelm University of Berlin.

== Nazi Party career ==
Yorck von Wartenberg joined the Nazi Party on 1 July 1930 (membership number 269,306), and became the Kreisleiter in Oels (today, Oleśnica) where he also served as a leader of the Sturmabteilung (SA). He next was made the head of the Eastern Affairs department in the Gau Silesia. After the Nazis seized power in 1933, he was named Landesgruppenführer (state group leader) of the Bundes deutscher Osten in Schlesien (German Federation of the East in Silesia). He also held public legislative offices as a district council member for Kreis Oels and as a member of the provincial parliament of Lower Silesia from March 1933. From November 1933 to March 1936, he served as a deputy of the Reichstag for constituency 9 (Oppeln). In the Reichstag election on 29 March 1936, he ran again for a seat on the Nazi Party's electoral list but did not win a mandate.

Yorck von Wartenberg died in September 1944 while serving as a Wehrmacht Major in combat operations in France.

== Sources ==
- Information about Wolfgang Yorck von Wartenburg in the Reichstag database
- Stockhorst, Erich (1985). 5000 Köpfe: Wer War Was im 3. Reich. Arndt. ISBN 978-3-887-41116-9.
