= Peter Carstens =

German geneticist

Peter Carstens (13 September 1903 in Brunsbüttel – January 1945 in Poznań) was a German geneticist and animal breeder and SS-Oberführer for the Nazi Party (NSDAP). Carstens joined the NSDAP in 1930 and also joined the SA. He was a professor at the Agricultural College at Hohenheim in 1935. In 1941 he was appointed rector of the State University of Poznan. In 1944 he was part of the management team of the National Socialist Teachers League. He died in January 1945 during the Battle of Poznan.

== See also ==
- List of Nazi Party members
