= Śliwice, Lower Silesian Voivodeship =

Śliwice
- Village
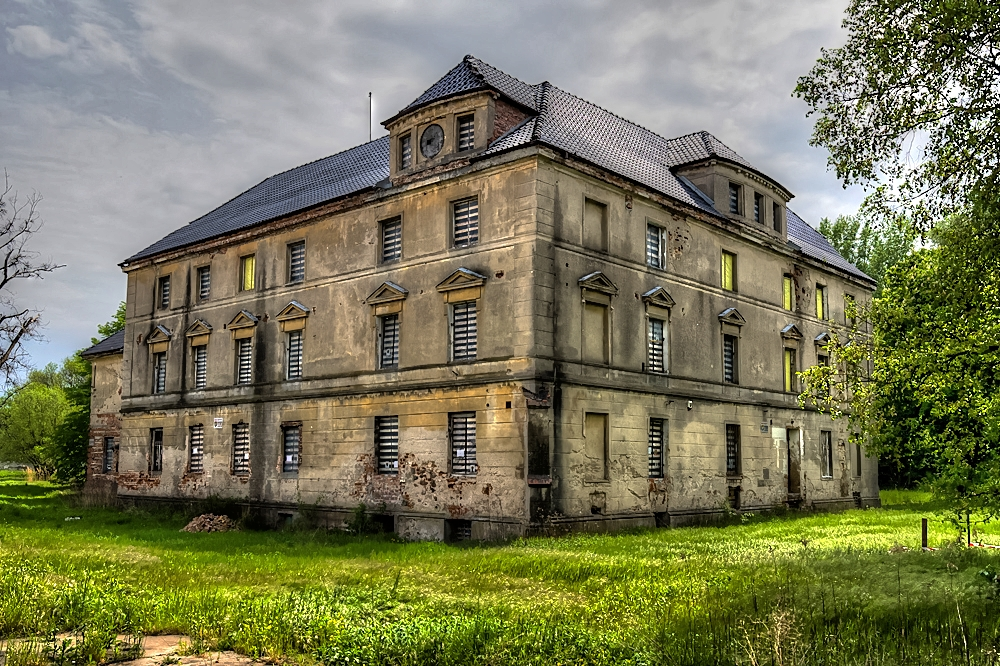
- Palace in Śliwice

- Location within Poland
- Coordinates: 51°07′40″N 17°12′47″E
- Country: Poland
- Voivodeship: Lower Silesian
- County: Wrocław
- Gmina: Długołęka
- Population: 380
- Time zone: UTC+1 (CET)
  - Summer (DST): UTC+2 (CEST)
- Vehicle registration: DWR

Śliwice [ɕliˈvit͡sɛ] is a village in the administrative district of Gmina Długołęka, within Wrocław County, Lower Silesian Voivodeship, in south-western Poland.

== History ==
The area became part of the emerging Polish state in the 10th century. Centuries later it passed to the Kingdom of Bohemia, Prussia, and the German Empire. It became part of Poland following Germany's defeat in World War II in 1945.
