= Alfred Wunderlich =

German politician

Alfred Wunderlich (December 2, 1901 in Dresden – May 21, 1963) was a German politician of the National Democratic Party of Germany (East Germany). He was a member of the Nazi Party from 1933 to 1937, when he was expelled after being convicted of embezzlement by the Dresden District Court. He was also briefly the Minister for Industry in East Germany.
