= Johanna Braach =

German police officer and deputy commander of concentration camp Uckermark (1907-?)

Johanna Braach (born 16 May 1907 in Altenhundem; d. after 1972) was Chief Secretary in the "Reich Central Office for combating the juvenile delinquency" and Deputy Head of the girls' concentration camp at Uckermark.

== Life ==
Johanna Braach was a policewoman when she joined the Nazi Party (membership number. 3.926.001) in early March 1937. From 1934 to 1941, she was deployed in the female police in Berlin. She then worked in the "Reich Central Office for combating juvenile delinquency" under Friederike Wieking. Wieking was a female detective in Germany, and head of section V A 3 of the Reich Criminal Police Office (Amt V) in the Reich Security Main Office, as well as the Reich Central Office for combating the juvenile delinquency and truancy.

Together with Lotte Toberentz, Braach visited several camps in 1941. Braach served as Deputy Head of the Uckermark girls camp from mid-1942 until its dissolution in April 1945. Lotte Toberentz was her supervisor during this period. About 1,000 girls and young women were interned in Uckermark by early 1945.

Johanna Braach lived in Minden from 6 June 1946 to 16 May 1957, where she was head of the female police force from 1947.

== Female police in Nazi Germany ==
The build-up phase of the WKP fell within the period of National Socialism. After 1935, the Prussian Landeskriminalamt had been converted into the Reich Criminal Police Bureau (RKPA). In 1937 the Nazis ordered the formation of a female police force, and further expanded it. Each major department of the judicial police was attached to a WKP Department. Their work was organized according to Nazi political principles.

Wieking, in June 1934 was a member of the National Socialist Women's organization or NS-Frauenschaft. She was also a member of the National Socialist Association of civil servants, where she led the activities of the WKP crime Director of Department I of the RKPA. On July 1, 1939 the WKP was attached to the "Reich Central Office for combating the juvenile delinquency". Since 1941 it had responsibility for the protection of youth camp of Moringen, and in May 1942 it was responsible for the Uckermark girls camp, near the Ravensbrück concentration camp in Fürstenberg/Havel. Wieking was imprisoned in 1945 for seven years by the Soviets.

During the war, however, the female police demonstrably participated in the so-called "deployment of Jewish transports" (der sogenannten bereitstellung von Juden transporten), as well as the establishment of National Socialist Youth Hostels in the occupied regions, for example in Poland and Latvia.

Amt V (Dept. V, crime - Kripo) was led by SS-Gruppenführer Arthur Nebe. From 15 August 1944, after Nebe was executed, it was led by SS-Oberführer and Oberregierungsrat Friedrich Panzinger; Friederike Wieking was the forensic Director of group V A 3 (female police).

== Trial in the West ==
In the Third Ravensbruck Trial, also called the Uckermark process, (14th to 16 April 1948), Braach and Toberentz were indicted of being part of the SS female guardians, also called Wardresses (Aufseherinnen, SS-Gefolge). They were tried under the British military penal code in the Hamburg Curiohaus, together with three other female relatives. The accused was charged with the following:

1. Abuse of female Allied prisoners in the period from May 1942 to April 1945 at the girls camp Uckermark
2. Participation in selection of female Allied prisoners for the gas chamber in the period from May 1942 to April 1945 at the girls camp Uckermark
3. Abuse of female Allied prisoners in the period from 1944 to April 1945 in the concentration camp at Ravensbrück
4. Participation in selection of female Allied prisoners for the gas chamber in the period from May 1942 to April 1945 in the concentration camp of Ravensbrück

Braach's indictment included one to four points. For lack of evidence, she was acquitted, as was Toberentz, on April 26, 1948. The indictment included only crimes against Allied nationals, and since only German non-conformist girls and young women were under the girls camp, this was not the subject of the process.

After the trial, Braach worked again in a managerial capacity at the West German police. From 1952 until her retirement in 1972, Braach was head of the female criminal investigation department in Bielefeld as well as in Essen.

== Literature ==
- Ernst Klee: the person lexicon to the Third Reich: who was what before and after 1945 Fischer-Taschenbuch-Verlag, Frankfurt am Main 2007, ISBN 978-3-596-16048-8.
- Silke Schäfer: to the self-image of women in the concentration camp. The camp of Ravensbrück. Berlin 2002 (dissertation in PDF format)
- Angelika Ebbinghaus: victims and perpetrators. Biographies of women in Nazi Germany. Fischer-Taschenbuch-Verlag, Frankfurt am Main 1996, ISBN 3-596-13094-8
