= Association of German Librarians =

Professional association

The Association of German Librarians (German: Verein Deutscher Bibliothekarinnen und Bibliothekare), also known by its German initialism VDB, represents the professional interests of academic librarians and works to promote academic books and libraries. It was founded in 1900, re-founded in 1948 (Munich) and is the oldest librarian association in Germany. The association has more than 1753 members (2020) who are employed in academic library service - or are being trained for it - or who are close to and represent the goals of the association. The office rotates with the respective board and, with the election of library director Anke Berghaus-Sprengel, has been located in Halle (Saale) at the university and State Library of Saxony-Anhalt since August 1, 2021.

== History ==
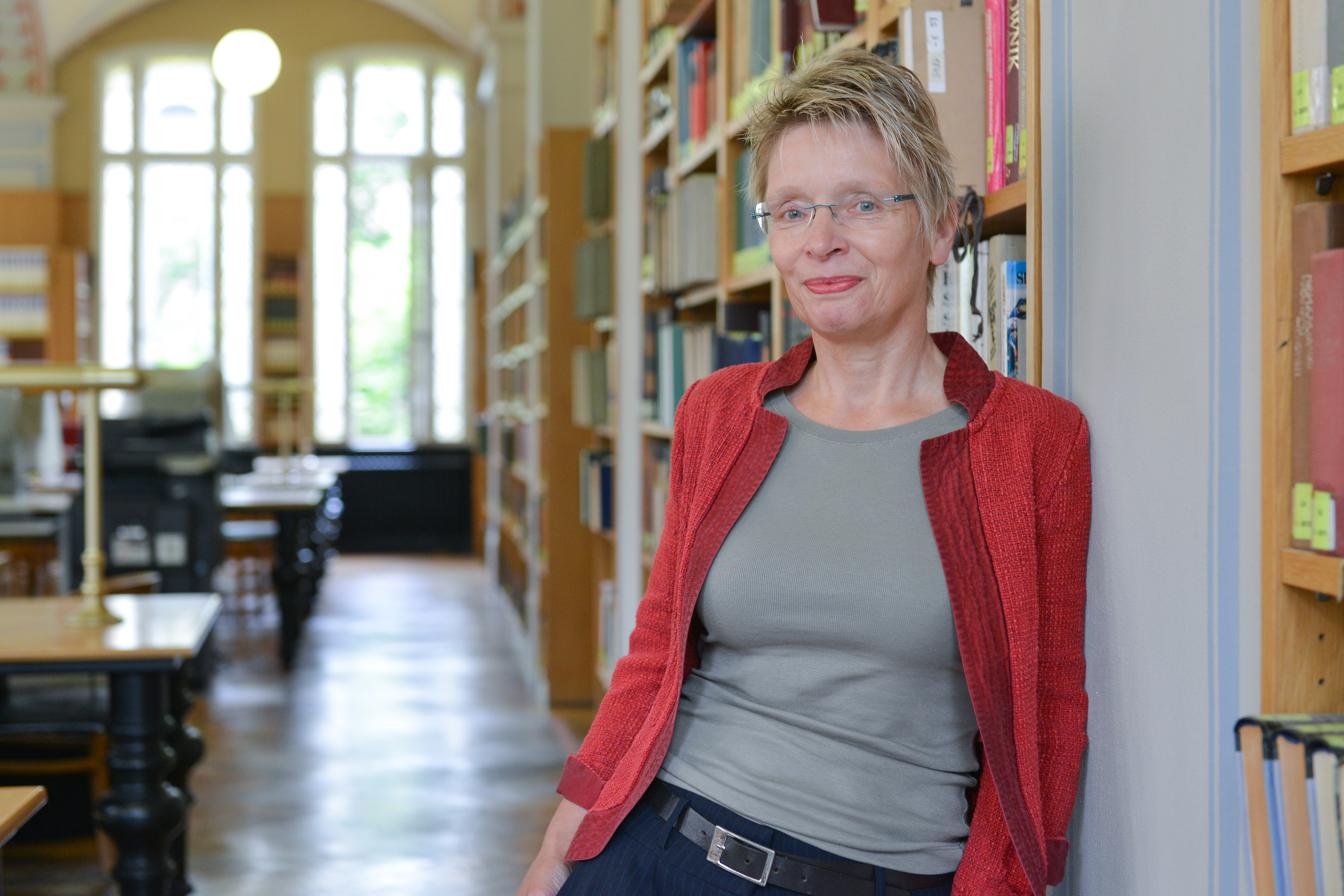
Anke Berghaus-Sprengel became the new chairwoman of the Association of German Librarians on August 1, 2021.

To promote librarianship, the Association of German Librarians was founded in 1900 after several years of preparation at the first Librarians' Day in Marburg. Members were initially 58 registered, a year later the number had already grown to 210. As part of the association's work, the "Yearbook of German Libraries" was published for the first time in 1902. This was a collection of statistical data on German libraries. At the time of the First World War, the association counted up to 600 members, who also sought cooperation between libraries.

After the "seizure of power" by the National Socialists, the influence of the association declined sharply, but a collapse in membership numbers could not be recorded. National Socialist ideas increasingly found their way into the commissions and meetings of the association; moreover, the majority of the members of the association's board were party members of the NSDAP. The importance of the association's work continued to decline sharply during World War II. After the end of the war, the association was re-established in 1948.

In the up to 16 commissions, mainly topics concerning factual work were dealt with. Furthermore, the association's own journal was now published regularly, dealing with librarianship and bibliography. In the 1960s, the number of members and the workload increased sharply, so the organization and the allocation of financial resources had to be reconsidered. One solution, however, which was rejected at a general meeting in 1969, was to involve the individual libraries more in financial responsibility. After the German Library Association was founded in 1973, the objectives of the association were changed. From then on, the focus was on questions of professional training and academic librarianship. On May 28, 2015, the official name was changed from the English "Association of German Librarians" to the German Verein Deutscher Bibliothekarinnen und Bibliothekare by amendment of the statutes by the General Assembly.

== Purpose and activities ==
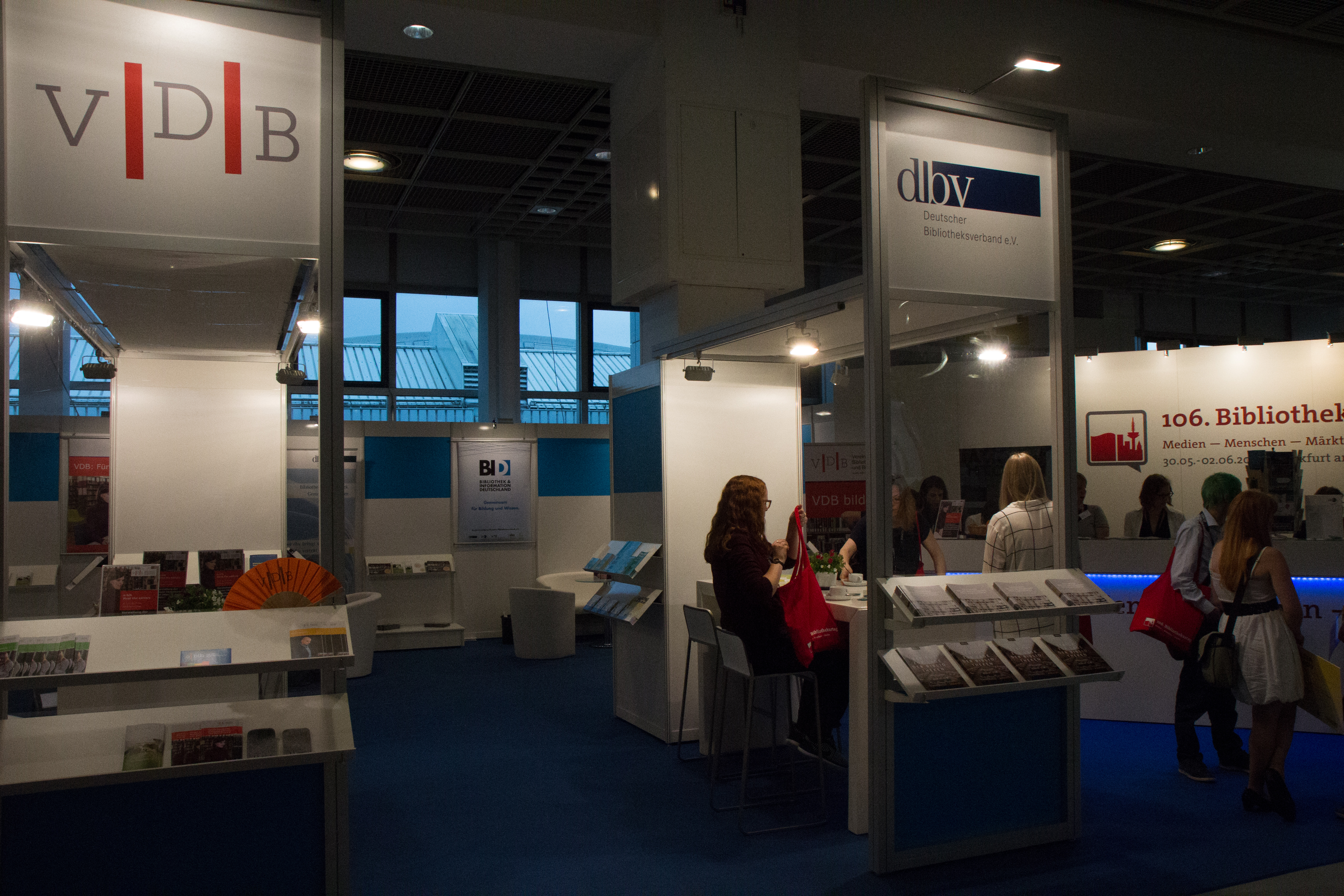
Booth of the VDB at the 106th German Librarian Conference 2017 in Frankfurt

The purpose is to strengthen the contact among the members, to represent their professional interests, to work for the expansion of their professional knowledge and to promote academic librarianship. On an ongoing basis, the VDB deals with all matters concerning the profession, holds continuing education events and conferences, issues publications, informs members and the public, and cooperates with other library and information organizations.

As of 2021, the VDB maintains seven standing commissions: the Commission on Professional Affairs, the Commission on Professional Qualifications, the Commission on Legal Affairs, the Commission on Research-Related Services, which was newly established in 2018, and, together with the German Library Association, the Building Commission, the Management Commission, and the Commission on Information Literacy.

Every spring, the association organizes the German Librarians' Day together with the professional association Information Bibliothek.

The association is a member of Bibliothek & Information Deutschland (BID), the umbrella organization of all library associations in Germany. Furthermore, it is involved in the Arbeitsgemeinschaft höherer Dienst (AhD), which represents the associations of the higher service with more than 100,000 members. Internationally, the VDB belongs to the International Federation of Library Associations and Institutions (IFLA), the Ligue des Bibliothèques Européennes de Recherche (LIBER) and the European Bureau of Library, Information and Documentation Associations (EBLIDA). Independent of these institutional connections, the VDB maintains friendly relations with many foreign professional associations, especially in neighboring countries.

However, as of March 2023, the VDB has suspended its membership in the International Federation of Library Associations and Institutions (IFLA).

== Literature ==
=== Publications ===
- Zeitschrift für Bibliothekswesen und Bibliographie, bimonthly (in the lemma information on predecessor publications with other names)
- o-bib. Das offene Bibliotheksjournal, organ of the association, 4 × per year (since 2014)
- VDB-Mitteilungen, organ of the association, 1 × per year (until 2014)
- Jahrbuch der Deutschen Bibliotheken, biennially

News about the association is also included in the Zeitschrift für Bibliothekswesen und Bibliographie (ZfBB), published by Klostermann.

=== Festschrift and bibliography ===
- Engelbert Plassmann, Ludger Syré (eds.): Verein Deutscher Bibliothekare 1900-2000. Festschrift. Harrassowitz, Wiesbaden 2000, ISBN 3-447-04247-8.
- Felicitas Hundhausen: Verein Deutscher Bibliothekare 1900-2000. Bibliography and Documentation. Harrassowitz, Wiesbaden 2004, ISBN 3-447-04844-1.
