= Otto-Wilhelm Wandesleben =

Otto-Wilhelm Wandesleben (born 16 December 1912, date of death unknown) was a German police officer and SS-Obersturmbannführer.

== Life and work ==
Born in Essen, Wandesleben entered the Kriminalpolizei after an unsuccessful time in studying in higher education. In the 1930s he was transferred to the Gestapo, where he gradually worked his way up to a management position. In December 1942 Wandesleben took over the management of department IV B 3 (Other churches, freemasonry) in Division IV B (Ideological opponents) of office group IV (Gestapo) in the RSHA. He worked aside Adolf Eichmann (Jewish Affairs, eviction matters) and Erich Roth (Political Catholicism and Political Protestantism, sects) as one of three speakers from this office group. Wandsleben reached the rank of Obersturmbannführer in the SS (membership number 290,022). In February 1944 Wandsleben worked as a cultural advisor to the Sicherheitsdienst division in Stettin.
