= Tatkreis =

Tatkreis ("Action Circle") was a Völkisch movement which existed during the era of the Weimar Republic. They followed the beliefs of most Völkisch movements but claimed the current republic "corrupt and sterile beyond repair" and called for "freedom and rebirth" in Germany. Tatkreis used a combination of nationalism and revolutionary Right-wing populism to generate passion within their ranks in a fashion that pre-dated National Socialism and was no doubt an influence.

Tatkreis called for an end to capitalism and promoted a neomercantilist ideology, a system which encourages exports and discourages imports, with a high level of state manipulation of the economy introducing high tariffs, and called for German self-sufficiency. This idea was easily received by the citizens of Germany, who lived in a time of depression after World War I. The middle-class craftsmen and shopkeepers were a majority in Germany and thus a key demographic.

At the end of the 1920s, Tatkreis was formed around the publication Die Tat ("Action"). Edited by Hans Zehrer, it produced a circulation of over 25,000 in 1933. After the rise to power of the National Socialist German Workers Party (NSDAP), Tatkreis was dissolved, as were other political parties under Hitler's rule. Even before this, the way the NSDAP undermined Tatkreis was by drawing from their membership, as both parties targeted the same types of followers.

== See also ==
- Conservative Revolutionary movement
