= Kamila Spáčilová =

Czech volleyball player (born 1988)

Personal information
- Nationality: Czech
- Born: 9 October 1988 (age 38)
- Height: 174 cm (69 in)
- Weight: 63 kg (139 lb)
- Spike: 276 cm (109 in)
- Block: 276 cm (109 in)

Volleyball information
- Number: 17 (national team)

Career
Years	Teams
2014	TJ Sokol Frýdek-Místek

National team
2014	Czech Republic

Kamila Spáčilová (born 9 October 1988) is a Czech female volleyball player. She is part of the Czech Republic women's national volleyball team.

She participated in the 2014 FIVB Volleyball World Grand Prix. On club level she played for TJ Sokol Frýdek-Místek in 2014.
