= Hans Bunge =

Hans-Joachim Bunge (3 December 1919 in Arnsdorf, Saxony – 27 May 1990 in Berlin) was a German Dramaturg, Director and Author. Bunge became famous through his conversations with Hanns Eisler about Brecht.

== Life ==
Bunge, the son of a doctor was the oldest of four brothers. He enrolled in the Hitlerjugend in 1934 at the age of fourteen. He became a member of the NSDAP (Nazi Party) in 1938 when he was nineteen and enlisted in the Wehrmacht a year later, fighting in the Second World War. He was involved in the invasions of Poland, France and the Soviet Union. He served until 1943 when he was captured and held as a prisoner of war in the Soviet Union.

He returned to Germany after six years in various prison camps. In January 1950 he married Renate Künzel and his first son Wolf was born. From 1950 to 1953 he studied German Literature, Aesthetics and Theatre History in Greifswald.

Through the mediation of Ruth Berlau (who first introduced Bunge to Brecht) he was appointed assistant director and assistant dramaturg at the Berliner Ensemble. From 1953-1956 he recorded the Berliner Ensemble rehearsals of Caucasian Chalk Circle and Life of Galileo and then from 1956-1959 he managed the Bertolt Brecht Archive and conducted many noteworthy interviews with colleagues and students of Bertolt Brecht, about whom he had written a PhD thesis in 1957. In 1954 his son Steffen was born.

After personal differences with Helene Weigel, Bunge joined the German Academy of Arts where he oversaw the first historical-critical edition of Brecht’s works, and later published special editions of the literary journal, Sinn und Form, dedicated to Hanns Eisler, Thomas Mann, Willi Bredel and others. In 1963 he married Therese Gottschalk and a year later his daughter Sabine was born.

On 7 January 1966, the politically unconventional Bunge, who was friends with Wolf Biermann, Heiner Müller and Robert Havemann, was dismissed from the Academy as a result of the 11th Plenum of the Central Committee of the SED (Socialist Unity Party).

Bunge worked as a director and dramaturg at the Volkstheater Rostock, 1968–1970, and at the Deutsches Theater Berlin, 1970-1978. 1968 In Rostock, he tried to bring Hanns Eisler's opera libretto on stage as a theater performance, which was prohibited by the authorities.

He subsequently worked as a freelance writer in Berlin. In 1972 he married his third wife Gudrun Weinert, and in 1973 his son Johannes was born. In 1976 he was one of the signatories of a letter protesting against the expatriation of Wolf Biermann.

== Works ==
- Werner Hecht, Hans-Joachim Bunge, Käthe Rülicke-Weiler: Bertolt Brecht. Leben und Werk, Berlin 1963
- Fragen Sie mehr über Brecht. Hanns Eisler im Gespräch, München 1970
- Brechts Lai-tu. Erinnerungen und Notate von Ruth Berlau, Darmstadt und Neuwied 1985
- Brecht-Zentrum Berlin, ed. (1991). Die Debatte um Hanns Eislers "Johann Faustus": eine Dokumentation [The debate on Hanns Eisler's "Johann Faustus": a documentation] (in German). ISBN 3-86163-019-2.
