= Walter Kopp =

Lieutenant colonel in the Wehrmacht in Nazi Germany (1913–1974)

Walter Kopp (1913 in Alsenz – 1974 in Gauting) was a lieutenant colonel in the Wehrmacht in Nazi Germany. After the Nazi defeat in 1945, he became the chief of one stay-behind network in West Germany, code-named KIBITZ-15. The British and US intelligence services had set up clandestine anti-communist organisations supposed to "stay-behind" in case of a Soviet invasion. Walter Kopp was described by his own North-American handlers as an "unreconstructed Nazi," and the KIBITZ-15 network as "a group with Nazi tendencies" in CIA documents released in June 2006.

In May 1945 Kopp wrote a letter to High Commissioner McCloy stating that he and a group of his friends were concerned over what might happen in case of a Russian invasion of Germany and wished to place themselves at the disposal of the Americans. Walter Kopp was later made chief agent of the KIBITZ stay-behind network.

In May 1953 Kopp's contract with the CIA was terminated "on the friendliest terms".

In 1968 he was Liaison officer of the Military District Command in Munich to the political parties.

== See also ==
- U.S. intelligence involvement with German and Japanese war criminals after World War II
