= Karl Blessinger =

German composer

Karl Michael Blessinger (21 September 1888 in Ulm – 13 March 1962 in Pullach, München) was a German composer. He joined the Nazi Party in 1932.
