= Eberhard Achterberg =

Religious scholar, journalist, high-ranking Nazi official

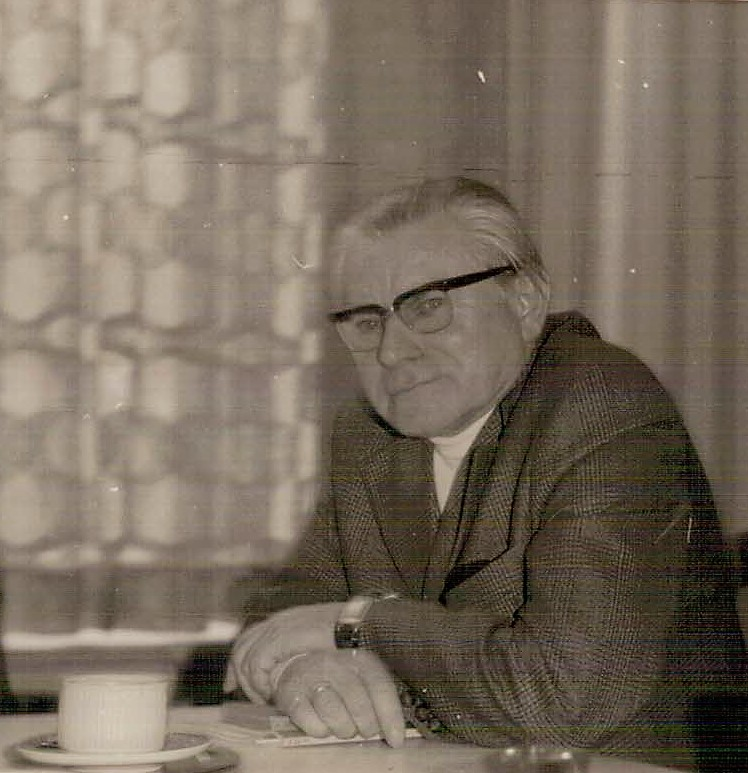
Eberhard Achterberg in 1974

Eberhard Achterberg (9 January 1910 in Oliva, West Prussia, now part of Gdańsk, Poland – 11 August 1983 in Neumünster) was a religious scholar, a journalist, a high-ranking Nazi official in the Amt Rosenberg and later a leading member of the German Unitarian Religious Community and school and university teacher.

== Life and career ==
Eberhard Achterberg joined the National Socialist German Workers' Party in February 1930, and was also in the SA. From 1934 to 1936 he contributed to Bernhard Kummer's journal Nordische Stimmen. In 1935, his "Germanische Religion im Streit der Gegenwart" was published.

He received his doctorate in 1940 from the University of Jena with a dissertation entitled Glück und Schicksal im germanischen Lebensgefühl. Eine Untersuchung über Art, Vorkommen und Bedeutung der altnordischen Worte für Glück und Schicksal in den Islendinga sögur. At the end of that year he became acting editor of Nationalsozialistische Monatshefte, published by Alfred Rosenberg, which described itself as the "central political and cultural periodical of the NSDAP". From July 1941, he was editor in chief. Rosenberg placed Achterberg in his department, the "Amt Rosenberg', whose official mission was to oversee all intellectual and ideological training and education in the Nazi Party. From March 1942 to January 1943, he headed the division for "Issues concerning Jews and Freemasons" (Juden- und Freimaurerfragen) on behalf of August Schirmer.

Achterberg never denied his Nazi past and openly described himself as having been "there and in favour". He wrote in 1983, in a letter to Erich Fried:

Half a century has gone by since our "seizure of power". Still the puzzling over how it could have come about. Now, those of us who were active in it at the time, we have to continue to keep silent; we may not say what motivated us at the time, what things looked like in the [Weimar] Republic. No one wants our contribution to the clarification of what was happening before 1933. They always only wish to listen to the witnesses who were all already "against it" at the time. However, this perforce yields an inaccurate picture and therefore in my view does not contribute to guarding against future dangers. And the new indications are frightening. I don't see the danger in the "neo-Nazis"; I see it with great concern in the growing xenophobia, in the still active demonisation of Communism that goes back to the Nazis, in the popular support for the death penalty, in the opposition to liberalisation of criminal penalties, criminal law and sexuality (legal articles § 218 and § 175). I see a danger in the increasing use of force by "the powers that be" against citizens, in discrimination against the peace movement and limitation of fundamental rights. Because I was active and involved at that time based on my convictions, for that reason I [will] speak out [saying] that such a development must not repeat itself.

After the Second World War, Achterberg lived with his family in Schleswig-Holstein. He based his journalistic work for the German Unitarians on a new approach which was strongly influenced by Albert Schweitzer. Achterberg had an important influence on Unitarian thought in Germany and was an "outstanding exponent" of Unitarianism, and for 14 years was the editor of the periodical Glaube und Tat—Deutsch-unitarische Blätter (now unitarische blätter), where he primarily concerned himself with issues raising questions about value orientation, anti-authoritarian education, social policy and personal interactions. Later, he was the spokesman for the public body Deutsche Unitarier Religionsgemeinschaft for the state of Schleswig-Holstein.

He lost a teaching position in German and philosophy at the Armed Forces University in Hamburg when one of his sons refused military service. In the 1970s he taught at the vocational college in Plön.

In 1983, shortly before his death, Achterberg was elected "Head of the Spiritual Council" of the German Unitarians. He died of a heart attack.

== Publications ==
- "Der deutsche Osten—Aufgabe und Verpflichtung". Nationalsozialistische Monatshefte volume 12 issue 130, Jan. 1941, pp. 14–20.
- "Not Gottes". Nationalsozialistische Monatshefte volume 13 issues 152/53, Nov./Dec. 1942.
- "Quo vadis, Frankreich?" Nationalsozialistische Monatshefte Jan. 1943, pp. 55–58.
- "Gegenkräfte in der Kunst". Nationalsozialistische Monatshefte volume 14 issues 155/56, 1943.
- "Meister Eckhart". Glaube und Tat issue 7, 1960.
- "Glaube im Atomzeitalter". Glaube und Tat issue 6, 1962.
- Der Mensch als Ganzheit und Einheit. Begegnung 2. Hameln: Soltsien, 1964. OCLC 698882873
- Albert Schweitzer. Ein Leben in der Zeitenwende. Leitblider, Gestalten und Ideen 2. Hameln: Soltsien, 1968. OCLC 14538087
- "Arbeit für den Frieden als religiöser Auftrag". Glaube und Tat issue 12, 1971.
- "Erziehung zur Zärtlichkeit". Wirklichkeit und Wahrheit issue 2, 1977.
- "Wertvorstellungen als Orientierungshilfe im menschlichen Miteinander". unitarische blätter issue 6, 1980.
- "Größe und Grenzen eines religiösen Humanismus". Der Humanist 8 (1982)
- Die Kraft die uns trägt. Suche nach Sinn in einer bedrohten Welt. Munich: Deutsche Unitarier, 1985. ISBN 3-922483-05-4 (posthumous collection of writings from 1952 on, ed. Bernhard Achterberg and Christel Schmidt)
