= Franz Konrad (SS officer) =

Austrian SS officer (1906–1952)

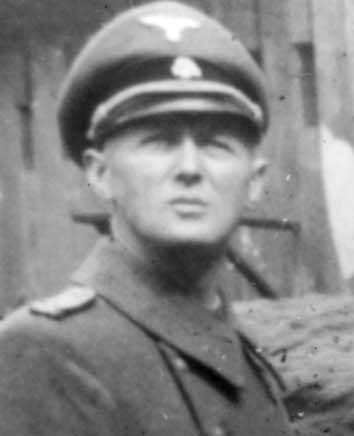
Konrad during the Warsaw Ghetto Uprising in 1943

Franz Konrad (1 March 1906 – 6 March 1952) was an Austrian SS officer who served as an administrative official of the Warsaw Ghetto. Konrad was responsible for the Werteerfassung, or "recording of valuables" of victims, which earned him the nickname "the King of the Warsaw Ghetto".

Konrad was an Austrian Nazi who served in several SS administrative positions in occupied Poland between 1939 and 1945. Konrad was convicted of murder during the Warsaw Ghetto Uprising and executed by hanging in Warsaw in 1952.

== Early life ==
Franz Konrad was born on 1 March 1906 in Liesing near Vienna, Austria-Hungary, the son of a miner. After school, Konrad obtained a business degree. He worked with various export firms as a bookkeeper. In 1932, he soon "demonstrated his proclivity for criminal action when he was caught stealing money from his employer. Not only did he lose his job, but Konrad was prosecuted for theft and spent three months in prison. Out of jail and out of work, Konrad drifted for a few weeks until his former defense lawyer helped him join the (then) illegal Austrian SS (number 46,204) in January 1933". Thereafter, he joined the Nazi Party with membership number: 1,085,499. Konrad, a member of the Lebensborn, was married in 1931 and subsequently became the father of three children.

== Career ==
After 19 June 1933, Austria banned the Nazi Party. The following year Konrad participated in the July Putsch, the failed Nazi attempt to overthrow the Fatherland Front. He was arrested and detained in Wöllersdorf-Steinabrückl, being released in December 1934. Konrad fled to Nazi Germany in July 1935 and entered the SS camp in Weisshenfeld for military training as a member of the SS-Verfügungstruppe (SS-VT). He returned to Austria following the Anschluss in April 1938 as a full-time SS leader and administrative officer of the SS-section XXXV, Sturmbann III/94 (SS-Führer und Verwaltungsführer des SS-Abschnitts XXXV, Sturmbann III/94). In January 1939, Konrad was appointed SS-Untersturmführer.

In November 1939, two months after the outbreak of World War II, Konrad was convened as a full-time administrative officer of the SS and SS-Oberscharführer der Waffen SS in Warsaw in occupied Poland. In a further development in the management school at the 1st SS Division Leibstandarte SS Adolf Hitler, Konrad was responsible for the construction and establishment of accommodation for troops and also the acquisition of goods for these troops in Warsaw.

In June 1941, Konrad was attached to Hermann Fegelein's cavalry and involved in Operation Barbarossa. In July 1941, he was promoted to the rank of SS-Obersturmführer. In July 1942, he returned to Warsaw and became an administrative manager for the acquisition of Jewish property and chattels in the Warsaw Ghetto, where he earned the nickname "the King of the Warsaw Ghetto". This was under the direct supervision of SS and Police Leader (SS und Polizeiführer) in Warschau SS-Oberführer Ferdinand von Sammern-Frankenegg, who was responsible for the requisition, sorting and routing of Jewish assets, funds, equipment and machinery. While in Warsaw, he is "alleged to have kept the Polish aristocrat Countess Barbara Kalewska as his personal mistress."

On 1 April 1943, Konrad was reassigned to the SS and Police Leader in Lublin SS-Gruppenführer Odilo Globocnik, and employed in the Ostindustrie GmbH. He soon returned to Warsaw under Sammern-Frankenegg in time for the Warsaw Ghetto Uprising, taking part in the crackdown. For the rest of 1943, Konrad was busy with the review of the prisoner of war camp at Włodawa, which was transformed into a labor camp. In addition, he was involved with the acquisition of valuables in the Białystok Ghetto, and the relocation of the machinery in the rest of the Warsaw Ghetto. At the end of 1943, Konrad finished his work for Ostindustrie GmbH, and from 3 January 1944 onwards was employed as administrative head of the SS office in Schloss Fischhorn near Zell am See in Austria. In February 1944, he was promoted to SS-Hauptsturmführer. He is alleged to have maintained Martha von Broskowitz as both personal secretary and mistress there.

On 5 May 1945, days before the German surrender, Konrad met Josef Spacil at the village of Mittensill near Taxenbach and gave him a substantial sum of Reichsbank currency. This was mostly money from the Berlin Reichsbank intended for some use after the war, while some of the cash was apparently distributed loosely to senior Gestapo and SS officers in the vicinity to pay German soldiers their wages.

== Post-war ==
After the war, Konrad was arrested and convicted in a joint trial in Poland with SS-Gruppenführer Jürgen Stroop, his commanding officer during the Warsaw Ghetto Uprising, for participating in the liquidation of the Warsaw Ghetto. During his trial, Konrad claimed to have taken photographs during the uprising only so that he could complain about Stroop's brutality to Hitler, but the court did not accept this claim. Convicted of personally murdering seven Jews and deporting 1,000 others to death camps, Konrad was sentenced to death. He was executed by hanging in Warsaw together with Stroop on 6 March 1952.

== Dates of rank ==
- January 1939: SS-Untersturmführer
- November 1940: SS-Oberscharführer of the Waffen-SS
- July 1941: SS-Obersturmführer
- February 1944: SS-Hauptsturmführer

== Bibliography ==
- Joachim Jahns. Der Warschauer Ghettokönig. Dingsda-Verlag, Leipzig, 2009, ISBN 978-3-928498-99-9.
- Ernst Klee. Das Personenlexikon zum Dritten Reich: Wer war was vor und nach 1945. Fischer-Taschenbuch-Verlag, Frankfurt am Main, 2007, ISBN 978-3-596-16048-8.
- Josef Wulf. Das Dritte Reich und seine Vollstrecker – Die Liquidation von 500.000 Juden im Ghetto Warschau. Arani-Verlags GmbH, Berlin, 1961.
- Ian Sayer & Douglas Botting. Nazi Gold, Granada Publishing, 1984.
- Höhne, Heinz. Der Orden unter dem Totenkopf, (English translation entitled The Order of the Death's Head, The Story of Hitler's SS) London: Pan Books Ltd. 1969.
- Koehl, Robert Lewis. The Black Corps University of Wisconsin Press, 1983.
- Reitlinger, Gerald. The SS: Alibi of a Nation 1922–1945. Viking (Da Capo reprint), New York. 1957. ISBN 0-306-80351-8
- Kenneth A. Alford & Theodore P. Savas. Nazi Millionaires: The Allied Search for Hidden SS Gold. Casemate, 2002. ISBN 0-9711709-6-7
