= Otto Schumann =

German Nazi SS and police official

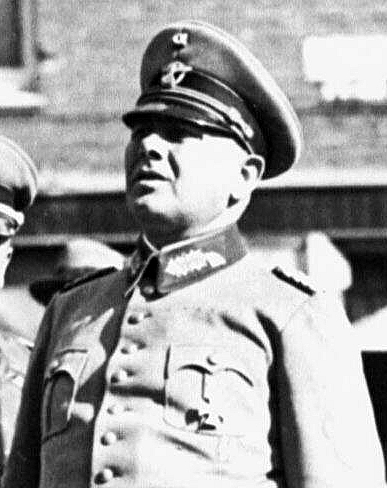
- Schumann in 1940
- Born: 11 September 1886; Metz, Alsace–Lorraine, German Empire
- Died: 8 November 1952 (aged 66); Detmold, West Germany
- Military career
- Allegiance: German Empire; Weimar Republic; Nazi Germany
- Branch: Prussian Army; Imperial German Navy; Freikorps; Ordnungspolizei
- Service years: 1907–1919; 1939–1945
- Rank: Hauptmann; SS-Gruppenführer and Generalleutnant of Police
- Commands: Befehlshaber der Ordnungspolizei (BdO), Reichskommissariat Niederlande; Inspekteur der Ordnungspolizei (IdO), Wehrkreis II, VI & XVII
- Conflicts: World War I World War II
- Awards: Iron Cross 1st and 2nd class War Merit Cross 1st and 2nd class with swords Wound Badge, in black

Heinrich Eduard Otto Schumann (11 September 1886 – 8 November 1952) was a German military officer in the German Empire and a police official in the Weimar Republic. He became an SS-Gruppenführer and Generalleutnant of the police in Nazi Germany. During the Second World War, he was the commander of the Ordnungspolizei (order police) in the German-occupied Netherlands and was involved in Holocaust-related deportations of Dutch Jews to Nazi extermination camps. He was never prosecuted for his wartime actions.

== Early life and military service in Imperial Germany ==
Otto Schumann was born in Metz, in Alsace–Lorraine when it was part of the German Empire. He was the son of an officer in the Royal Prussian Army. After attending the Realgymnasium in Trier, he began military training at the Cadet Academy at Schloss Oranienstein in Diez in April 1897, and then at the Prussian Main Cadet Institute at Lichterfeld in April 1903. In March 1907, he was commissioned as a Leutnant in the 136th (4th Lorraine) Infantry Regiment, headquartered in Straßburg (today, Strasbourg). In October 1913, he transferred to the Imperial German Navy and participated in the First World War as an officer in the marines, serving as an adjutant and battalion commander. He was discharged from the military at the end of December 1919 with the rank of Hauptmann, having been awarded the Iron Cross, 1st and 2nd class and the Wound Badge, in black.

== Career in the Weimar Republic ==
From March to October 1919, Schumann joined a Freikorps unit in East Prussia and then became a government district commissioner and, from the beginning of 1920, a Kreis councilor to the Landrat (district administrator) in Wehlau (today, Znamensk, Kaliningrad Oblast). From January 1920 to July 1921, Schumann was a member of the conservative German National People's Party. He joined the Prussian police force in July 1921 and was initially posted to the police headquarters in Königsberg. In June 1924, he transferred to Münster, in April 1928 to Hildesheim and in January 1933 to Hanover.

== Police career in Nazi Germany ==
After the Nazi seizure of power, he joined the Nazi Party in 1933 (membership number 1,753,690). From May 1935, he was chief of the Schutzpolizei (Schupo) in Weißenfels. After being promoted from Major to Oberstleutnant he became chief of the Schupo in Stettin (today, Szczecin) in January 1936. He advanced to Inspector of the Order Police (Inspekteur der Ordnungspolizei, IdO) in Wehrkreis (military district) II (Pomerania) in November 1937. On 20 April 1939, Schumann was accepted into the Schutzstaffel (SS number 327,367). Four months later, he was promoted to SS-Standartenführer.

After the outbreak of the Second World War, during the invasion of Poland, he was head of the police department on the staff of the Chief of Civil Administration attached to the 4th Army. After the Battle of France, he was appointed the Commander of the Order Police (Befehlshaber der Ordnungspolizei, BdO) in the German-occupied Netherlands in June 1940, with headquarters at The Hague. In this capacity, police units under his command participated in repression of the Dutch population and in the deportation of Dutch Jews to extermination camps. Schumann returned to Germany in December 1942 as the IdO for Wehrkreis VI, based in Münster. His police officers' duties included guarding forced laborers and organizing logistics for the district's Order Police battalions, which were involved in violent crimes against European Jews. In September 1943, Schumann was placed on leave but he was reactivated between March and October 1944, serving as the IdO in Wehrkreis XVII in Vienna. In November 1944, he left active police service and was assigned to the staff of the SS-Oberabschnitt West in Düsseldorf.

== Post-war ==
After the end of the war, Schumann was interned by the Allies from January to May 1946. He was awarded a pension in November 1948 and died in Detmold in November 1952. He never faced judicial proceedings for his actions.

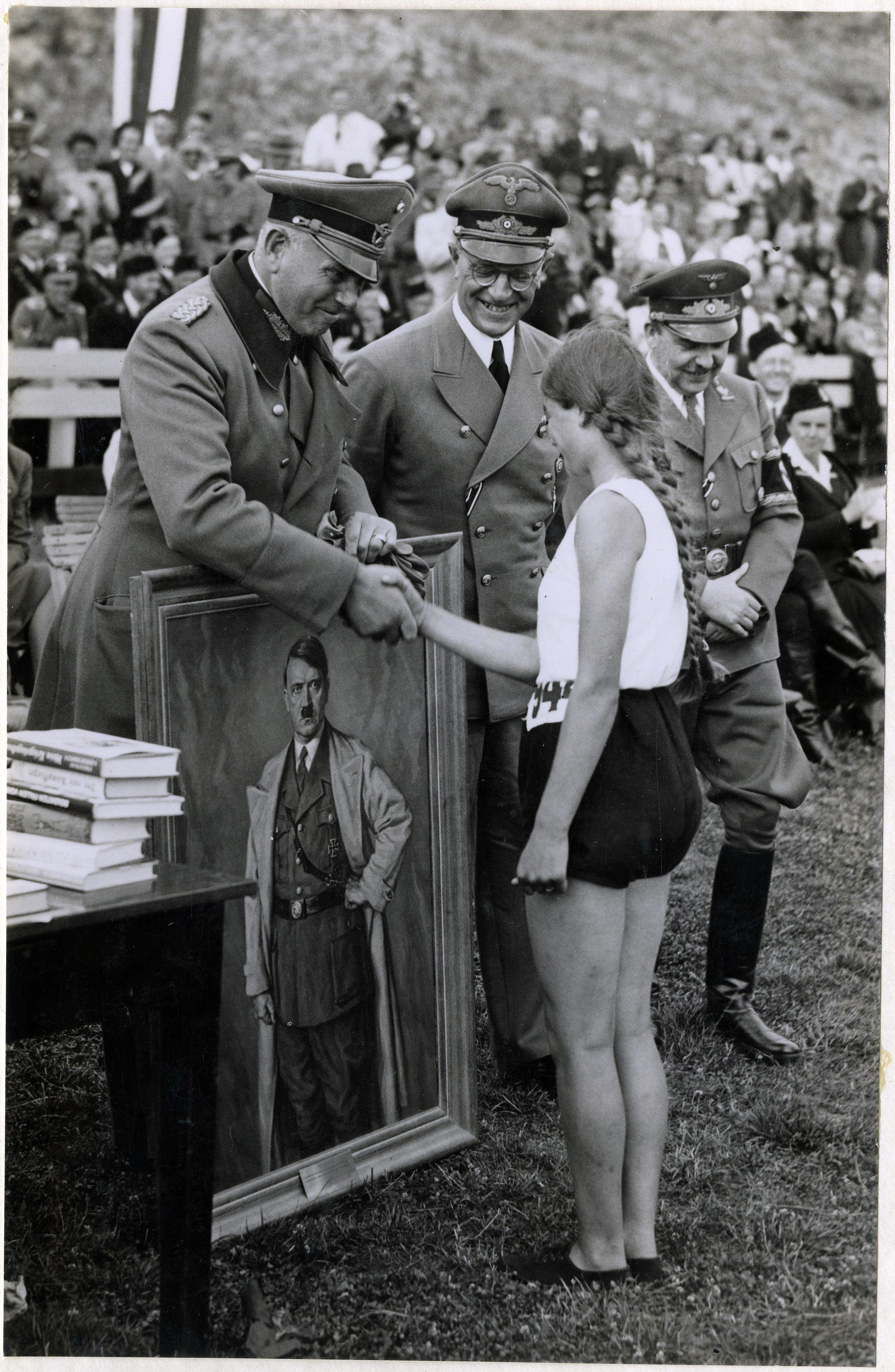
Schumann (left), with Reichskommissar Arthur Seyss-Inquart, presents a portrait of Adolf Hitler as a prize to an athlete at The Hague, 21 July 1941

== SS and police ranks ==
SS and Police Ranks
Date	Rank
July 1936	Oberst der Schutzpolizei
15 August 1939	SS-Standartenführer
20 April 1940	SS-Oberführer
30 January 1941	SS-Brigadeführer und Generalmajor der Polizei
27 August 1943	SS-Gruppenführer und Generalleutnant der Polizei

== Sources ==
- Lilla, Joachim: Leitende Verwaltungsbeamte und Funktionsträger in Westfalen und Lippe (1918–1945/46): Biographisches Handbuch. Münster: Aschendorff Verlag, 2004, p. 277f, ISBN 3-402-06799-4.
- Otto Schumann (1886–1952) – der Polizeigeneral (in German).
- Schiffer Publishing Ltd., ed. (2000). SS Officers List: SS-Standartenführer to SS-Oberstgruppenführer (As of 30 January 1942). Schiffer Military History Publishing. ISBN 0-7643-1061-5.
- Short biography and photo of Otto Schumann (in Polish).
