= Stalinisme : la politique soviétique pendant la deuxième guerre mondiale =

Book by Giselher Wirsing (1944)

Stalinisme : la politique soviétique pendant la deuxième guerre mondiale ('Stalinism: Soviet politics during the Second World War') was a booklet published in French in 1944, which argued that Soviet imperialism posed an immediate threat to the nations of Europe. It was written by 'Vindex', nom-de-plume for Giselher Wirsing.

A Swedish language edition was published, titled Stalinismen. Sovjetpolitiken under det andra världskriget. During the summer of 1944, the German Information Centre in Stockholm distributed 7,700 copies of the book.
