= Hans Walter Aust =

German journalist (1900–1983)

Hans Walter Aust (20 June 1900 in Mainz – 28 April 1983) was a German journalist.

== Biography ==
Hans Walter Aust came from a Silesian family. His grandfather, Rudolph Austin (1833–1907), was a merchant in Neusalz, the father, Aust Walther (1871–1928), was a fittings manufacturer in Berlin. Aust had military training as a cadet and officer. He joined the NSDAP (Nazi Party) on 1 May 1933. He was a member of the Reich Press Chamber and was exempt from military service. In 1942 he began a two-year prison sentence and was expelled from the Reich Press Chamber. After the end of World War II, he worked from May 1945 in the Tägliche Rundschau, where he was promoted to deputy chief of the economic portfolios, and became a member of the SED. When the Tägliche Rundschau was discontinued, he received the post of editor in chief of the German political journal Deutsche Außenpolitik, which he held until 1969. He also wrote several articles for Die Weltbühne.

Aust was a member of the Gesellschaft zur Verbreitung wissenschaftlicher Kenntnisse (Board of the Society for the Dissemination of Scientific Knowledge) and the Liga für Völkerverständigung (League for International Understanding). He received the Vaterländischer Verdienstorden (Patriotic Order of Merit) in 1960 in bronze and in 1965 in silver.

== Work ==
- Deutsche Außenpolitik. Für einen Friedensvertrag mit Deutschland. Sonderheft 1 der Zeitschrift, Rütten & Loening, Berlin 1959
- Die Widersprüche zwischen den Westmächten und die Rolle der Bonner Militaristen Reihe: Material für Agitatoren und Propagandisten, Hg. SED. Dietz, Berlin 1960
- "Südostasien zwischen gestern und morgen". In Deutsche Außenpolitik. Rütten & Loening, Berlin 1962
