= Hans Zehrer =

German philosopher and journalist (1899–1966)

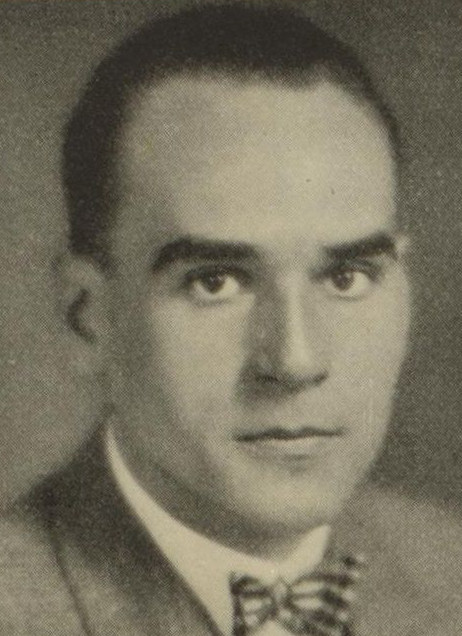
- Born: Hans Zehrer; 22 June 1899; Berlin, German Empire
- Died: 23 August 1966 (aged 67); West Berlin, West Germany
- Works: Man in this World

Philosophical work
- Era: 20th century philosophy
- Region: Western philosophy
- School: Conservative Revolution

Hans Zehrer (pseud. Hans Thomas; 22 June 1899 – 23 August 1966) was a German philosopher and journalist. He edited a leading right-wing journal, Die Tat, and founded the Tat Circle.

== Biography ==
Zehrer was born in Berlin to a postal official. In 1917 Zehrer enlisted as a soldier and remained so after the First World War. He took part in the Kapp Putsch of 1920.

Zehrer studied at Berlin University before becoming a journalist. Between 1923 and 1929 he was editor of the paper the Vossische Zeitung. His political thinking was influenced by Arthur Moeller van den Bruck; he also admired Vilfredo Pareto and Henri de Man. He became an editor of Die Tat in 1930, which under his direction saw its circulation grow dramatically. To prevent coming under control of the NSDAP, Zehrer introduced a varied group of writers to the magazine, like Gregor Strasser and Kurt von Schleicher.

The Turkish left-Kemalist Kadro magazine conducted an interview with him in 1932.

With Hitler in power in 1934 (Strasser and Schleicher being murdered in the Night of the Long Knives) Zehrer relinquished himself from editorial duties (Zehrer was married to a Jewish woman until 1938) and retired to the island Sylt. Zehrer returned to Berlin and became the manager of the Stalling publishing house in 1938.

From 1943 to 1945 Zehrer was a soldier in the Luftwaffe, but saw no active service. In 1946 he briefly worked for the then British controlled Die Welt. He was chief editor of the Sonntagsblatt from 1948 to 1953, after which he became chief editor at Die Welt (taken over by Axel Springer in that year). He also was a columnist for the Bild-Zeitung.

He died in West Berlin.

== Works Translated into English, Partial List ==
- Man in this World (1952, abridged)
