= Ferdinand Zimmermann =

German writer (1898–1967)

Ferdinand Friedrich Zimmermann (August 14, 1898 – July 11, 1967) was a German author and journalist. He used his pseudonym of Ferdinand Fried to publish.

== Life ==
Zimmermann was born in Bad Freienwalde in the Prussian Province of Brandenburg, studied economics and philosophy at Berlin, and worked for the newspapers Vossische Zeitung and Berliner Morgenpost before joining the magazine Die Tat in 1931. A supporter of Nazism he joined the Schutzstaffel in 1934 and the Nazi Party itself in 1936. During the War, he worked at the German Charles-Ferdinand University in Prague. After the War, he found work at the Sonntagsblatt and Die Welt newspapers.

In 1931 he published the book Das Ende des Kapitalismus (The End of Capitalism), in which he offered the view that laissez-faire capitalism was dead, and that German autarky was the future.

== Works ==
- Das Ende des Kapitalismus. Jena 1931.
- Die Wende der Weltwirtschaft. Goldmann, Leipzig 1937.
- Latifundien vernichteten Rom! Eine Studie der römischen Agrarverhältnisse und ihrer Auswirkungen auf Volk u. Staat. Verlag Blut und Boden, Goslar 1938.
- Der Aufstieg der Juden. Verlag Blut u. Boden, Goslar 1937.
- Die soziale Revolution : Verwandlung von Wirtschaft und Gesellschaft. Goldmann, Leipzig 1942.
- Der Umsturz der Gesellschaft. Union, Stuttgart 1950.
- Wandlungen der Weltwirtschaft. Goldmann, München 1950.
- Abenteuer des Abendlandes. Diederichs, Düsseldorf 1951.

== See also ==
- Tatkreis
