= Edmund Stoeckle =

German politician

Edmund Stoeckle (1899 in Augsburg - 1986 in Ottobeuren) was a German politician. He was the mayor of Augsburg, Germany, between 1933 and 1934. He was a member of the Nazi Party.

The son of Andreas Stoeckle, a prominent Catholic lay activist in Munich who was head of the state comptroller's office ( Oberrechungshof), with key connections with the Reform Catholic movement, Edmund emerged as a leading figure within student circles in Munich, furthering the volkisch-Nazi ideas of Catholic student activists like Hansjörg Maurer, Josef Roth and Alfred Miller. He enrolled in the Ludwig-Maximilians-Universität München in the autumn of 1919, having seen battle action on the western front from 1917 to 1918, and on the streets of Munich as a member of the Freikorps Epp in the spring of 1919.
