= Nationalsozialistische Monatshefte =

Nazi Party magazine (1930–44)

- December 1938 issue of Nationalsozialistische Monatshefte
- Editor: Alfred Rosenberg
- Frequency: Monthly
- First issue: 1930
- Final issue: 1944
- Country: Germany
- Language: German
- OCLC: 2264738

The Nationalsozialistische Monatshefte (National Socialist Monthly) was a political and cultural magazine produced by the Nazi Party and edited first by Adolf Hitler (1930–October 1933) and then by Alfred Rosenberg (May 1935 – 1944). Its first edition was published in 1930. It served as a forum for specialists of various academic disciplines, including linguistics and history, to present their research in a popular format, often with a racial emphasis. The magazine, based in Munich, ceased publication in 1944.
