= Josef Spacil =

German Nazi SS colonel (1907–1967)

- Born: 3 January 1907; Munich, Bavaria, German Empire
- Died: 13 February 1963 (aged 56); Munich, West Germany
- Military career
- Allegiance: Nazi Germany
- Branch: RSHA
- Service years: 1931–1945
- Rank: Standartenführer (Colonel)
- Unit: 3rd SS Division Totenkopf
- Awards: War Merit Cross, German Cross

Josef Spacil (3 January 1907, Munich – 13 February 1963) was a German Nazi SS-Standartenführer (colonel), the Befehlshaber der Sicherheitspolizei und des SD Niederlande (Commander of the Security Police and Security Service Netherlands), an SS-Wirtschafter beim Höheren SS- und Polizeiführer Russland-Süd (SS economist at the Higher SS and Police Leader office for southern Russia) and the Chef der Amtsgruppe II (Chief of Section II) in RSHA. In 1945 he was involved with the disposal of Nazi gold in the Bavarian Alps.

According to the American authors Kenneth Alford and Theodore Savas, SS-Standartenführer Josef Spacil was promoted to SS-Oberführer on 20 April 1945, but there is no independent confirmation.

== Life ==
Josef Spacil was born in Munich on 3 January 1907 to a family of Czech heritage (Spáčil). He was raised in Bavaria by his mother and a stepfather surnamed "Aue". In his youth Spacil trained to become a professional wages accountant. Spacil joined the Nazi Party (NSDAP) before 1933 and was member number 1,200,941. He joined the SS on 10 April 1931 (membership number # 6797) and on 1 October 1932 he was awarded the officer rank of SS-Untersturmführer (2nd lieutenant). The promotion to SS-Obersturmführer (1st lieutenant) took place on 23 August 1933, to SS-Hauptsturmführer (captain) on 9 November 1933 and SS-Sturmbannführer (major) on 9 November 1934.

From 1934 SS-Sturmbannführer Josef Spacil was used on the staff of the Reichsführer-SS. A year later he transferred to the SS Main Office (SS-Hauptamt). On the staff of the SS-Danube office (Oberabschnittes Donau), he was an SS-Wirtschafts- und Verwaltungsführer or economic and administrative leader in 1938. Between 12 December 1939 and 28 February 1940 he was assigned to the 1. SS-Totenkopf-Reiterstandarte (the 3rd SS Division Totenkopf cavalry regiment).

On 23 December 1937 he married the Mannheim-born Marianne Behrens. Over 1943 to 1945 he is alleged to have maintained a mistress named Gretl Biesecker.

From 31 March 1940 his duties were as a staff officer of the Chief of the SS-Wirtschafts- und Verwaltungshauptamtes (WVHA) or SS Economic and Administration Main Office under SS-Obergruppenführer Oswald Pohl. He also served in the SS-Verwaltungsschule or SS Administration School at Dachau between 1 April to 21 June 1940.

After the Western campaign, Spacil served for nine months between 22 June 1940 to 12 March 1941 as the Befehlshaber der Sicherheitspolizei und des SD or Commander of the Security Police and SD in the occupied Netherlands. On 1 May 1941 he returned to the staff of the Reichsführer-SS where he remained until 1 August 1941.

At some point during the war Spacil was awarded the Kriegsverdienstkreuz (War Merit Cross) 1.Klasse mit Schwertern (First Class with Swords). The award had two variants: mit Schwertern was given only to soldiers for exceptional service in battle above and beyond the call of duty (but not worthy of an Iron Cross which was more a bravery award).

After the start of the war against the USSR, Spacil was attached to the Höheren SS- und Polizeiführer (HSSPF) Russland-Nord or Higher SS and Police Leader for northern Russia in Riga, Latvia, until 15 October 1941. As an economist he was transferred on 26 October 1941 to the parallel office for southern Russia. From 1 March 1944 Spacil took over as the last Chef die Amtsgruppe II (Organisation, Verwaltung und Recht) des Reichssicherheitshauptamtes or Chief of Section II (organization, administration and law) of the Reich Security Main Office (RSHA). On 20 April 1944 was promoted to SS-Standartenführer (colonel) and in January 1945 he was awarded the Deutsches Kreuz in Silber (German Cross in silver) for distinguished service to the state.

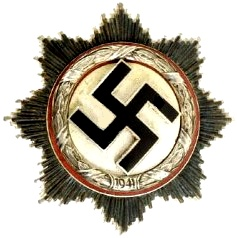
Deutsches Kreuz in Silber: German Cross in silver

"Spacil's RSHA Bureau II had administered the assets everyone knew had been stolen from those shipped off to slave labor and death camps. Spacil had issued a flurry of decrees aimed at extricating wealth from overrun cities and territories in the East."

As the affective heads of accounts inside the RSHA, Spacil was involved in or aware of Operation Bernhard, although to what degree is still disputed. After the war SS-Gruppenführer Otto Ohlendorf (1907–1951, head of the interior division of SD) alleged that Spacil “...spent considerable effort placing forged British banknotes into circulation for the purchase of black market items in southern Europe.”

== Nazi Gold ==
Under instructions from his senior officer SS-Obergruppenführer Ernst Kaltenbrunner, Spacil entered the new Reichsbank building in Berlin on 22 April 1945 "removing at gunpoint jewels, securities and the last remaining foreign exchange assets held in the vault, valued altogether at 23 million gold marks." The foreign currency was later valued at approximately US $9,131,000.

Spacil and a small RSHA staff and their immediate families travelled to Salzburg by aeroplane whilst the Reichsbank loot was driven south. Spacil ensured that his wife got away safely from Berlin to Bad Ischl and his personal secretary (and mistress) got away to Munich.

On 4 May 1945 Spacil met with several leading SS officers, Nazi Party functionaries and Gustav Adolf Scheel, the Gauleiter of Salzburg. He was informed of the Soviet army occupation of Vienna and the approach of US soldiers in nearby Berchtesgaden. The following day Spacil met up with SS-Hauptsturmführer Franz Konrad at the village of Mittensill near Taxenbach and gave him a substantial sum of Reichsbank currency. This was mostly money from the Berlin Reichsbank intended for some use after the war while some of the cash was apparently distributed loosely to senior Gestapo and SS officers in the vicinity to pay German soldiers their wages. In view of the rapidly advancing US soldiers Spacil was obliged to discreetly hide the loot. He gave orders and supervised the burial of much of treasure along the road between Taxenbach and Rauris in the Bavarian Alps. (It was alleged that Konrad had done likewise with some of the funds he received.) On 7 May Spacil encountered SS-Brigadeführer Erich Naumann (a member of the SD and a former commanding officer of Einsatzgruppe B) and together they drove to Radstadt to meet SS-Obersturmbannführer Otto Skorzeny. Spacil arranged to deliver some currency and other ‘liquid assets’ to help Skorzeny pay his men. On 8 May Spacil drove to Fishhorn castle near Zell am See and met up with SS-Hauptsturmführer Franz Konrad for the last time Spacil "lavished 500,000 Reichsmarks, 2,500 dollars and 1,550 Swiss francs on a certain Franz Conrad."

On 8 May 1945 Spacil changed into an ordinary Wehrmacht uniform and joined a group of retreating soldiers of the 352 Volksgrenadier Division surrendering to US troops. Spacil gave his name and rank as "Sergeant Aue". However, his real identity was soon revealed and after interrogation he was persuaded to show American Counter Intelligence Corps (CIC) officers the location of the buried treasure. Following their interrogation the CIC described Spacil as "a fanatical Nazi" and suspected the former SS officer of having secreted some of the cash to another location, but were unable to prove anything.

== Post-war ==
On 9 November 1945 Spacil formally testified against his former boss Obergruppenführer und General der Polizei und Waffen-SS Ernst Kaltenbrunner, Chief of the Security Police. This testimony was later used at the Nuremberg trials.

After the war Spacil was employed as a clerk in Munich. An investigation of the prosecution against him in Hamburg on 8 June 1967 (after his death) was terminated since the investigation revealed no sufficient reason to bring an indictment.

According to the American authors Kenneth Alford and Theodore Savas, Josef Spacil "established a chain of supermarkets", but there is no independent confirmation.

=== Summary of SS career ===
- SS number: 6797
- Nazi Party Number: 1,200,941
- Primary Position: SS-Standartenführer und Chef der Amtsgruppe II (Chief of Section II) in RSHA
- SS-Positions: Befehlshaber der Sicherheitspolizei und des SD Niederlande (Commander of the Security Police and Security Service Netherlands, 1940–41), an SS-Wirtschafter beim Höheren SS- und Polizeiführer Russland-Süd (SS economist at the Higher SS and Police Leader office for southern Russia, 1941–44)

Dates of Rank

- SS-Untersturmführer: 1932
- SS-Obersturmführer: 1933
- SS-Hauptsturmführer: 1933
- SS-Sturmbannführer: 1934
- SS-Obersturmbannführer: 1936
- SS-Standartenführer: 1938
- Chef der Amtsgruppe II: 1944
- SS-Standartenführer der Reserve Waffen SS: 1944

Awards

- Kriegsverdienstkreuz (War Merit Cross) (First Class with Swords)
- Deutsches Kreuz in Silber (German Cross in silver) (31 January 1945)

== Literature ==
- Ian Sayer & Douglas Botting, Nazi Gold (Granada Publishing, 1984)
- Höhne, Heinz. Der Orden unter dem Totenkopf, (English translation entitled The Order of the Death's Head, The Story of Hitler's SS) London: Pan Books Ltd. (1969)
- Klee, Ernst. Das Personenlexikon zum Dritten Reich. Wer war was vor und nach 1945, Frankfurt-am-Main: Fischer-Taschenbuch-Verlag, (2007), p. 588, ISBN 978-3-596-16048-8.
- Koehl, Robert Lewis. The Black Corps University of Wisconsin Press, (1983)
- Reitlinger, Gerald. The SS: Alibi of a Nation 1922-1945. Viking (Da Capo reprint), New York (1957). ISBN 0-306-80351-8
- Shirer, William L.. The Rise and Fall of the Third Reich, Gramercy (1960). ISBN 0-517-10294-3
- SS Officer Personnel Files, National Archives and Records Administration, College Park, Maryland
- History of the Counter Intelligence Corps: vol. XXV, Occupation of Austria and Italy (Fort Holabird, Baltimore, 1959).
- Kenneth A. Alford & Theodore P. Savas, Nazi Millionaires: The Allied Search for Hidden SS Gold (Casemate; 2002) ISBN 0-9711709-6-7
- Mark C. Yerger, German Cross in Silver-Holder of the SS and Police (R James Bender Publishing, 2002), ISBN 0-912138-87-4
