= List of Nazis =

A list of notable people who were at some point followers of the ideology of Nazism or affiliated with the Nazi Party. This is not meant to be a list of every person who was ever a member of the Nazi Party. This is a list of notable figures who were active within the party and did something significant within it that is of historical note or who were members of the Nazi Party according to multiple publications. For a list of the main leaders and most important party figures see: List of Nazi Party leaders and officials.

This list has been divided into four sections for reasons of length:

1. List of Nazis (A–E) : from Gustav Abb to Hanns Heinz Ewers (~ 247 names)
2. List of Nazis (F–K) : from Arnold Fanck to Kurt Küttner (~ 268 names)
3. List of Nazis (L–R) : from Bodo Lafferentz to Bernhard Rust (~ 232 names)
4. List of Nazis (S–Z) : from Ernst Sagebiel to Fritz Zweigelt (~ 259 names)

== See also ==
- List of Nazi doctors
- List of Nazi ideologues
