= Wolfgang Aly =

German classical philologist

Wolfgang Aly (12 August 1881 in Magdeburg – 3 September 1962 in Phaistos, Crete) was a German classical philologist. He was a member of the NSDAP (Nazi Party). On 1 December 1931, he joined and was the first member of the NSDAP (Nazi Party) of Freiburg University.

== Works (selected) ==
See also External links section below.

Index verborum Strabonianus, Bonn, Habelt, 1983
