= Karl Ferdinand Abt =

German politician

Karl Ferdinand Abt (June 9, 1903 in Ober-Ramstadt - late February or early March 1945 in Frauenfeld in Kurland) was a Hessian Nazi politician and former Member of Parliament of the People's State of Hesse in the Weimar Republic.

Abt was the son of Karl Abt and Frau Margaretha, née Kogel. He was initially a Protestant and married to Helene, née Stiep. Abt has worked as a salesman and was then employed in the publishing of the Hessian State newspaper. In the Nazi Party he was a local group leader and then, in 1932, a district leader of Darmstadt. In 1929 he was elected as a city councilman in Darmstadt. From 1932 to 1933 he was a member of the Landtag. During World War II he performed military service, and was killed in the last days of the war in the Courland Pocket.
