= Ernst Wilhelm Eschmann =

German author, sociologist, and playwright

Ernst Wilhelm Eschmann (pseud. Leopold Dingräve, Von Severus, 1904 - 1987) was a German writer, sociologist and playwright.

== Selected works ==
- (1930) Der faschistische Staat in Italien
- (1933) Vom Sinn der Revolution
- (1934) Die Aussenpolitik des Faschismus
- (1936) Griechisches Tagebuch
- (1961) Im Amerika der Griechen
- (1970) Tessiner Episteln

=== Plays ===
- (1939) Ariadne
- (1950) Alkestis
