= List of Nazis (L–R) =

A list of notable people who were at some point a member of the defunct Nazi Party (NSDAP). This is not meant to be a list of every person who was ever a member of the Nazi Party. This is a list of notable figures who were active within the party and did something significant within it that is of historical note or who were members of the Nazi Party according to multiple reliable publications. For a list of the main leaders and most important party figures see: List of Nazi Party leaders and officials.

Overview A–E F–K L–R S–Z

== L ==
- Bodo Lafferentz
- Willy Lages
- Erwin Lambert
- Heinz Lammerding
- Hans Lammers
- Felix Landau
- Carl Langbehn
- Herbert Lange
- Rudolf Lange
- Johanna Langefeld
- Franz Langoth
- Carl Lautenschläger
- Hartmann Lauterbacher
- Julius Friedrich Lehmann
- Fritz Lehmann
- Rudolf Lehmann (military judge)
- Georg Leibbrandt
- Helmut Lemke
- Tiana Lemnitz
- Fritz Lenz
- Siegfried Lenz
- Josef Leopold
- Ernst Lerch
- Arthur Liebehenschel
- Heinz Linge
- Felix Linnemann
- Prince Bernhard of Lippe-Biesterfeld
- Julius Lippert
- Kurt Lischka
- Karl Litzmann
- Wilhelm Friedrich Loeper
- Ernst Friedrich Lohndorff
- Bruno Lohse
- Hinrich Lohse
- Enno Lolling
- Gustav Lombard
- Konrad Lorenz
- Werner Lorenz
- Hans Loritz
- Georg Lörner
- Joseph Lortz
- Hans Louis Ferdinand von Löwenstein zu Löwenstein
- Franz Lucas
- Kurt Ludecke
- Barbara Lüdemann
- Erich Ludendorff
- Hanns Ludin
- Martin Luther (diplomat)
- Viktor Lutze

== M ==
- Heinz Macher
- Fritz Mackensen
- Georg Hans Madelung
- Waldemar Magunia
- Franz Maierhofer
- Ernst Mally
- Wilhelm Rudolf Mann
- Maria Mandl
- Werner March
- Elisabeth Marschall
- Benno Martin
- Heinrich Matthes
- Gisela Mauermayer
- Rudolf Mauersberger
- Emil Maurice
- Friedrich Maurer
- Friedrich Mauz
- Josef Mayr
- Emil Mazuw
- Fritz ter Meer
- Herbert Mehlhorn
- Werner Meinhof
- Josef Albert Meisinger
- Hans-Otto Meissner
- Guido von Mengden
- Josef Mengele
- Oswald Menghin
- Pieter Menten
- Willi Mentz
- Rudolf Mentzel
- Christian Mergenthaler
- Willy Messerschmitt
- Adolf Metzner
- Alfred Meyer
- Emil Heinrich Meyer
- Konrad Meyer
- Kurt Meyer
- Hermann Michel
- Agnes Miegel
- August Miete
- Erhard Milch
- Leopold von Mildenstein
- Rudolf Mildner
- Erich Mix
- Helmut Möckel
- Karl Möckel
- Paul Moder
- Wilhelm Mohnke
- Robert Mohr
- Otto Moll
- Eberhard Wolfgang Möller
- Theodor Morell
- Georg Konrad Morgen
- Hans Joachim Moser
- Hans Möser
- Joachim Mrugowsky
- Reinhold Muchow
- Hellmuth von Mücke
- Hermann Muhs
- Eric Muhsfeldt
- Robert Mulka
- Heinrich Müller (Gestapo)
- Ludwig Müller
- Paul Heinrich Theodor Müller
- Alfred Müller-Armack
- Hans Münch
- Ludwig Münchmeyer
- Eugen Munder
- Franz Murer
- Wilhelm Murr
- Lothar Müthel
- Martin Mutschmann

== N ==
- Jakob Nagel
- Alfred Naujocks
- Erich Naumann
- Hans Naumann
- Werner Naumann
- Arthur Nebe
- Josef Neckermann
- Otto Nerz
- Hermann Neubacher
- Erich Neumann (politician)
- Konstantin von Neurath
- Elly Ney
- Karl Nicolussi-Leck
- Oskar von Niedermayer
- Herms Niel
- Hans Nieland
- Johann Niemann
- Paul Nitsche
- Emil Nolde
- Gustav Adolf Nosske
- Franz Novak
- Walter Nowotny

== O ==
- Carl Oberg
- Josef Oberhauser
- Herta Oberheuser
- Theodor Oberländer
- Max Oehler
- Richard Oehler
- Rudolf August Oetker
- Paul Ogorzow
- Otto Ohlendorf
- Wilhelm Ohnesorge
- Alice Orlowski
- Werner Ostendorff
- Heinrich Oster
- Wilfred von Oven

== P ==
- Alexander Palfinger
- Gerhard Palitzsch
- Günther Pancke
- Friedrich Panse
- Friedrich Panzinger
- Siegfried Passarge
- Franz von Papen
- Max Pauly
- Bartosz Pawlak
- Friedrich Peter
- Kurt Petter
- Wilhelm Pfannenstiel
- Franz Pfeffer von Salomon
- Helmut Pfeiffer
- Josef Pfitzner
- Walter Pfrimer
- Philipp, Landgrave of Hesse
- Franz Philipp
- Anton Piëch
- Hermann Pister
- Ludwig Plagge
- Otto Planetta
- Paul Pleiger
- Alfred Ploetz
- Kurt Plötner
- Franz Podezin
- Max Poepel
- Oswald Pohl
- Johannes Popitz
- Helmut Poppendick
- Ferdinand Porsche
- Hermann Prieß
- Karl-Heinz Priester
- Alfred Proksch (politician)
- Hans-Adolf Prützmann
- Carl Friedrich von Pückler-Burghauss
- Emil Puhl

== Q ==
- Walter Quakernack
- Günther Quandt
- Herbert Quandt
- Rudolf Querner

== R ==
- Peter Raabe
- John Rabe
- Franz Rademacher
- Erich Raeder
- Karl Rahm
- Otto Rahn
- Rudolf Rahn
- Boris Rajewsky
- Friedrich Rainer
- Roland Rainer
- Hans Ramshorn
- Kurt Ranke
- Otto Rasch
- Karl Rasche
- Sigmund Rascher
- Ernst vom Rath
- Walter Rauff
- Hermann Rauschning
- Paul Reckzeh
- Wilhelm Rediess
- Eggert Reeder
- Anni Rehborn
- Günther von Reibnitz
- Hermann Reinecke
- Heinz Reinefarth
- Wilhelm Reinhard (SS officer)
- Fritz Reinhardt
- Anton Reinthaller
- Hans Conrad Julius Reiter
- Lothar Rendulic
- Theodor Adrian von Renteln
- Cecil von Renthe-Fink
- Andreas Rett
- Hermann Reutter
- Ernst Graf zu Reventlow
- Eugen Rex
- Joachim von Ribbentrop
- Gustav Richter
- Bolko von Richthofen
- Georg Rickhey
- Alfred Rieche
- Fritz Rieger
- Walter Riehl
- Gustav Riek
- Johannes Riemann
- Renate Riemeck
- Julius Ringel
- Karl Ritter
- Karl Ritter (director)
- Carl-Heinz Rodenberg
- Arthur Rödl
- Walter Rohland
- Ernst Röhm
- Karl von Roques
- Eduard Roschmann
- Gerhard Rose
- Alfred Rosenberg
- Erwin Rösener
- Gerhard Roßbach
- Fritz Rössler
- Paul Rostock
- Helge Rosvaenge
- Alfred Roth
- Erich Roth
- Erich Rothacker
- Oswald Rothaug
- Curt Rothenberger
- Artur Rother
- Heinz Röthke
- Carl Röver
- Jutta Rüdiger
- Ernst Rüdin
- Arthur Rudolph
- Joachim Rumohr
- Philipp Rupprecht
- Bernhard Rust

== Bibliography ==
- Klee, Ernst: Das Personenlexikon zum Dritten Reich. Wer war was vor und nach 1945. Fischer Taschenbuch Verlag, Zweite aktualisierte Auflage, Frankfurt am Main 2005 ISBN 978-3-596-16048-8
- Klee, Ernst Das Kulturlexikon zum Dritten Reich. Wer war was vor und nach 1945. S. Fischer, Frankfurt am Main 2007 ISBN 978-3-10-039326-5
- Snyder, Louis Leo, Encyclopedia of the Third Reich, Ware: Wordsworth Editions, 1998 (originally published New York City: McGraw-Hill, 1976)
- Wistrich, Robert S. (2001). Who's who in Nazi Germany (3 ed.). Routledge. ISBN 0-415-26038-8.
