= Franz Stofel =

German SS officer and concentration camp commander (1915-45)

Franz Stärfl
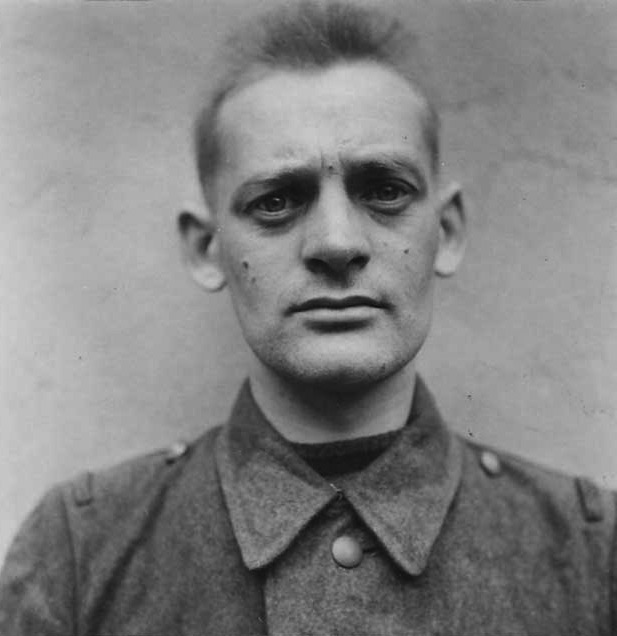
- Franz Stärfl in British custody, 1945
- Born: 5 October 1915; Hamburg, German Empire
- Died: 13 December 1945 (aged 30); Hamelin Prison, Allied-occupied Germany
- Occupation: Concentration camp guard
- Status: Executed by hanging
- Motive: Nazism
- Conviction: War crimes
- Trial: Belsen Trial
- Penalty: Death

Details
- Date: 4–11 April 1945
- Locations: Mittelbau-Dora; Bergen-Belsen
- Military career
- Allegiance: Nazi Germany
- Branch: Schutzstaffel
- Rank: Hauptscharführer
- Unit: SS-Totenkopfverbände

Franz Stärfl, alias Xaver Stärfel, alias Franz Stofel, (5 October 1915 – 13 December 1945) was a Nazi German SS-Hauptscharführer and camp commander of the Kleinbodungen subcamp of Mittelbau-Dora during World War II. Arrested by the Allies and convicted of war crimes in the Belsen Trial, Stärfl was executed by hanging at Hamelin prison in 1945.

== Life ==
Stärfl was born in Hamburg, Germany, in 1915.

From October 1934 to 1935 he served in the Reichswehr, but he decided a greater opportunity to be a professional soldier was to be found in the SS, which he joined in April 1936. As a result, became assigned to the SS-Totenkopfverbände (SS-TV) at Dachau concentration camp. From March 1939 to January 1944 Stärfl headed small work details in the warehouse area of Dachau. In mid-January 1944 he transferred to the Mittelbau-Dora concentration camp complex, and from August 1944 served as Kommandoführer (Detachment Commander) for the construction of a satellite camp in Kleinbodungen. From 3 October 1944 to early April 1945 he was leader of the Kleinbodungen subcamp. It consisted of about 620 foreign prisoners forced to work in the Mittelwerk, a missile construction facility for the V-2 missile.

Near the end of the war, as the United States 9th Army approached Mittelbau-Dora, Stärfl was ordered by SS-Obersturmführer Franz Hössler to evacuate Kleinbodungen on 4 April 1945. The next day, 610 prisoners were led outside the camp by Stärfel, his deputy Wilhelm Dörr, and 45 SS-men to the nearest town of Herzberg to be "evacuated" by rail. Stärfl forced the prisoners on a death march to the Bergen-Belsen concentration camp. By 10 April 1945, after some prisoners had managed to escape, the evacuation transport came to the village of Groß Hehlen north of Celle, near the front lines. Four or five prisoners were shot while trying to escape or slow down the march. On 11 April 1945, the remaining 590 prisoners arrived at Bergen-Belsen.

== Conviction and execution ==
On 15 April 1945, the Bergen-Belsen concentration camp was liberated by British troops, where they found 60,000 survivors and 10,000 dead bodies. The SS camp personnel were detained and forced to carry away all the corpses and bury them in mass graves. Stärfl was then arrested by British military personnel and interrogated. In the Belsen Trial, held between 17 September and 17 November 1945, he was indicted for the murders of prisoners during the death march. Stärfl was convicted on 17 November 1945 and sentenced to death. He was hanged on 13 December 1945 in Hamelin prison.
