= Under the Skin (play) =

2013 play by Yonatan Calderon

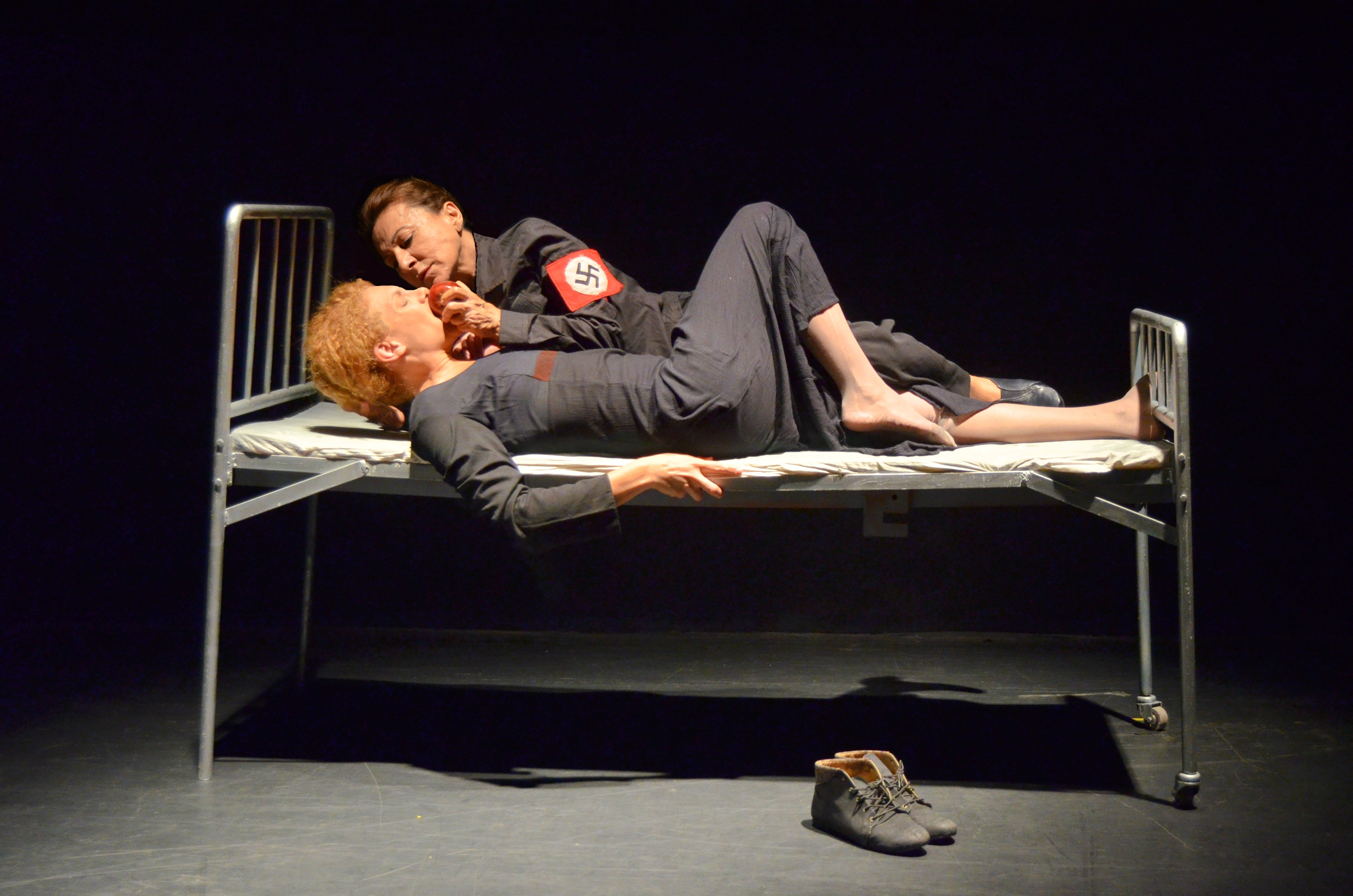
The show Under the Skin directed by Rakefet Binyamin in Tel Aviv 2014

Under the Skin (מתחת לעור - Mitakhat La'Or) is a 2013 play by Israeli playwright Yonatan Calderon. The play tells the historical story of the love affair between the lesbian Nazi officer Anneliese Kohlmann and one of her female Jewish prisoners in Neuengamme concentration camp.

The play is based on Kohlmann's Belsen trial transcript, and also on Holocaust survivors' testimonies, including the testimony of Ruth Bondy, a well-known Israeli writer, translator and journalist.

Under the Skin premièred at the LGBT center in Tel Aviv in 2014 and at the Old Red Lion Theatre in London in 2018.

== Plot ==
The play takes place both in Tel Aviv during the 1991's Gulf War and in 1944 Nazi Germany. Charlotte Brod is an elderly Holocaust survivor who lives in her Tel Aviv apartment. One evening during the Gulf War, Kirsten Eberhardt, a young German journalist, knocks on her door and questions her about a secret love affair that took place in Neuengamme concentration camp between the Jewish prisoner and her Nazi commander, Ilse Kohlmann (Based on Anneliese Kohlmann).

The play consists of flashbacks to the concentration camp in which the actress who plays the Holocaust survivor plays the Nazi commander woman, and the actress who plays the young German journalist plays Charlotte, now a young Jewish prisoner.

== Critical reception ==
The London production received favorable reviews. Jeff Prestridge called it a "Short, sharp and brave theatre". Lara Domke found it "a deeply moving and touching retelling whose importance is unquestionable". Judi Herman thought that "playwright Yonatan Calderon has wrought a short play of shocking beauty". Keith Mckenna found that "the play encourages understanding and compassion and avoids melodrama". Suzanne Frost thought that the play "digs deep into the human psyche to explore what war and what power does to people and what love can do". Kezia Niman found it a lyrical and thought-provoking play, and Ian Foster called it a Bold fringe work and wrote that "Calderon makes a powerful case for really interrogating what we mean by morality, how we look at the past and how we let it shape us now."
