= Anneliese Kohlmann =

German SS guard at Bergen-Belsen camp

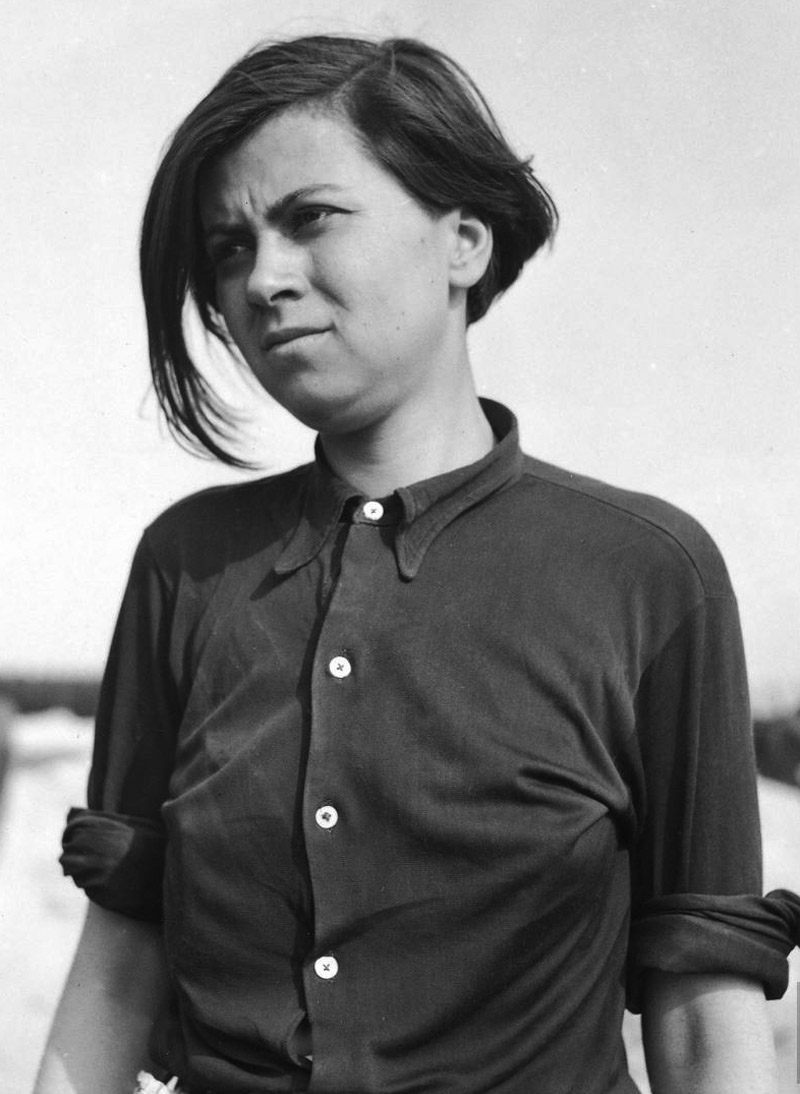
- Kohlmann in 1945
- Born: 1 March 1921; Hamburg, Weimar Republic
- Died: 17 September 1977 (aged 56); West Berlin, West Germany
- Years active: 1944–1945
- Employer: SS-Gefolge
- Status: Convicted of war crimes
- Conviction: War crimes
- Penalty: 2 years imprisonment

Anneliese Kohlmann (23 March 1921 – 17 September 1977) was a German SS guard at the Neugraben and Hamburg-Tiefstack subcamps of the Neuengamme concentration camp during World War II. Born in Hamburg, she joined the Nazi Party in 1940 and was conscripted into the SS-Gefolge in 1944. As a guard, she was accused of physically abusing prisoners, including whipping and kicking them. Kohlmann, a self-identified lesbian, also engaged in a coercive relationship with a Czech Jewish prisoner, involving sexual barter.

After the liberation of Bergen-Belsen in April 1945, Kohlmann was arrested while disguised as a prisoner and tried for war crimes at the Belsen trials in 1946. She was convicted and sentenced to two years in prison. Following her release, she worked as a truck driver in Hamburg and later West Berlin, where she lived until her death in 1977.

Kohlmann's actions at Bergen-Belsen, including her role in burying victims' bodies, were documented in widely published photographs. Her story, particularly her relationship with the prisoner, has been depicted in the play Under the Skin by Yonatan Calderon.

== Biography ==
=== Early life ===
Anneliese Kohlmann was born on 23 March 1921 in Hamburg, Germany, to a poor single mother. At the age of four, she was adopted by Margaretha and Georg Kohlmann. Her father, Georg Kohlmann, a teacher and Freemason, was employed at a home for Freemasons in Hamburg. Her mother, Margaretha, testified in court that her daughter was raised according to Christian values: they regularly attended church together on Sundays.

Kohlmann attended a private school in Hamburg until 1938. After completing her education, she fulfilled her obligatory year of service by working as a cook for the German Red Cross.

She applied for Nazi Party membership on 10 February 1940, and was accepted on 1 April 1940, at the age of 19, receiving membership number 8,547,312. During this period, she openly acknowledged her attraction to women. Despite this, she became engaged to a man in November 1943. At the time, she worked as a streetcar attendant in Hamburg until November 1944. According to her mother's petition, Kohlmann suffered from a severe form of anemia and had endured "many years of rickets" as well. She received medical treatment for these conditions, including care by Dr. Wilhelm Redeker, a former concentration camp prisoner, up until November 1944. This is documented in her mother's petition and Dr. Redeker's medical certificate dated 23 May 1946.

=== Camp service ===
On 4 November 1944, Kohlmann was conscripted into the SS-Gefolge (SS Women's Auxiliary) and was appointed as female guard (Aufseherin) at the Neugraben subcamp of the Neuengamme concentration camp system. This system used prisoner forced labour in various locations across Northern Germany. She served at Neugraben until February 1945. In March 1945, she was transferred to the slave-labor camp in Hamburg-Tiefstack, and when it closed on 7 April 1945, she assisted with the transport of female prisoners to Bergen-Belsen.

Kohlmann was a self-identified lesbian. Whilst working in the concentration camps she had a relationship with a Czech Jewish prisoner called Lotte and organised postings to follow her from camp to camp. The inmate engaged in coerced sexual barter with Kohlmann (this may or may not have included sexual acts) to support herself and her mother, stepfather and half-brother, using the forced same sex relationship to survive.

Shortly before the liberation of Bergen-Belsen, on 14 April 1945, Kohlmann put on civilian clothes and smuggled herself into the camp. A survivor named Věra Fuchsová recalled in a 1994 interview that:

"And there was a thing that happened to us: in Hamburg we already had a SS woman, a guard in the camp, a young girl, we called her Bubi, and she treated us kind of ok. A young, pretty girl, but, as it turned out later, she was gay. And she fell in love with one of our fellow prisoners. I don’t know in how far the girl came close to her, but she had her mother there and she would have done anything for her, and on account of Bubi she had it good. After the liberation of Belsen we suddenly found that Bubi is among us, wearing the striped prisoner clothing. What to do now? She treated us fine, but she was a SS woman, so what to do with her? The camp Eldest sent a girl to the English head officer to tell him."

Survivor Edith Kraus recalled that:

"Yes, we could have asked ourselves why she had chosen to suffer with us and endure lice, infections and intolerable living conditions if she did not have to. But then I thought she probably loved Lotte so much that she refused to be separated from her, even at such a price."

Another survivor remembered caresses between Kohlmann and the prisoner, but it cannot be conclusively confirmed to what extent the relationship became physical or who initiated the relationship.

== Arrest, trial, and later life ==
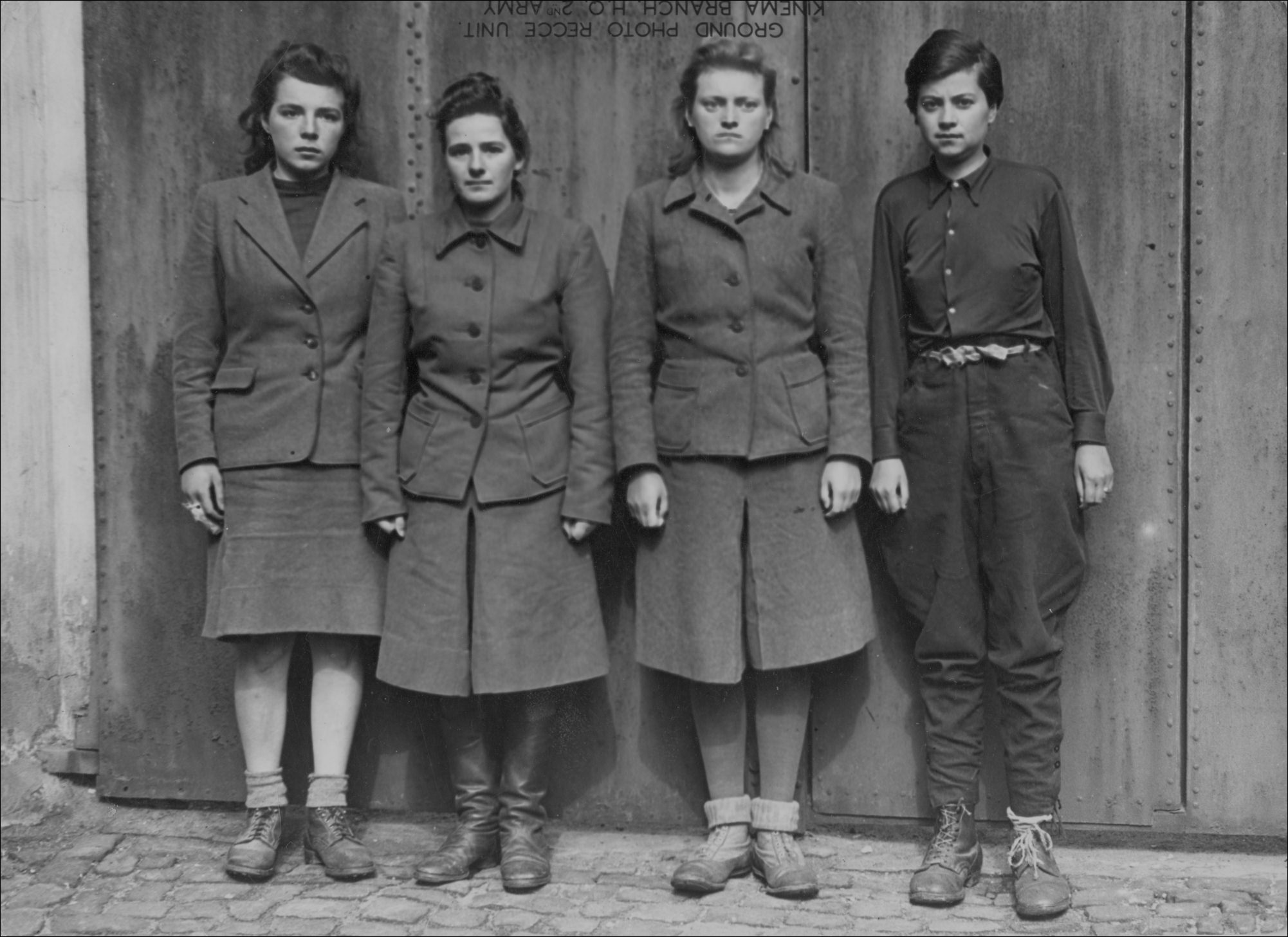
From left to right, Marta Löbelt, Gertrud Rheinhold, and Irene Haschke wear Nazi uniforms, while Kohlmann appears in an ill-fitting men's uniform, reportedly because she was arrested in a prisoner uniform.

Soon after the liberation, Kohlmann was arrested on the grounds of Bergen-Belsen after former prisoners from Neugraben and Tiefstack identified her while she was wearing prisoner clothing. She was held in Celle prison until her trial in Hamburg. In 1946, Kohlmann was tried for war crimes at the Belsen trials in Lüneburg.

Kohlmann was found guilty of repeatedly whipping inmates, including pregnant women, across the face, kicking until they lost consciousness, condemning at least one female prisoner to punishment of 30 lashes for a piece of stolen bread, and sexually exploiting younger women. Another guard named Maria Borowski testified that Kohlmann particularly physically abused older women, and survivor Marianne Braun testified that:

"Kohlmann apparently thought I was about to insult her, and she hit me roughly 30 times with a piece of wood in the face, on the head, on the hands, arms, and sides."

She was sentenced to only two years in prison due to her short service in the SS and her defense claim that she did not kill anyone. Kohlmann also claimed that she helped four women escape during the transport to Bergen-Belsen. After serving her sentence at Fuhlsbüttel prison (cut in half by time spent in jail before trial), Kohlmann remained in Hamburg. She worked as a truck driver and moved to West Berlin in 1965. On 17 September 1977, Kohlmann died in Berlin at the age of 56.

== In popular culture ==
- Kohlmann is known as one of the SS female camp guards at Bergen-Belsen who, following the camp's liberation, was ordered to help bury the bodies of victims in mass graves, a scene photographed by George Rodger and widely published, including in Life magazine.
- Kohlmann is one of the main characters in the play Under the Skin by Israeli playwright Yonatan Calderon. The play depicts a love affair between a lesbian Nazi commander (Kohlmann) and one of her female Jewish prisoners.
