= Paul Müller =

Paul Müller may refer to:

- Paul Müller (actor) (1923–2016), Swiss actor
- Paul Müller (biologist) (1941–2010), German biologist
- Paul Müller (gymnast) (born 1946), Swiss Olympic gymnast
- Paul Müller (ice hockey) (1886–1974), Swiss ice hockey player
- Paul Hermann Müller (1899–1965), Swiss chemist
- Paul J. Mueller (1892–1964), United States Army officer
- Paul Milford Muller (1937–2013), American engineer and businessman
- Paul O. Müller (1915–1942), German physicist
- Paul Mueller, alleged early 20th century serial killer responsible for between 40 and 100 deaths in the United States and Germany
- Paul Heinrich Theodor Müller (1896–1945>), German member of the SS at Auschwitz concentration camp
