= Alexander Palfinger =

Holocaust perpetrator

Alexander Palfinger (1894– 1961) was a German Nazi functionary in German-occupied Poland during the Holocaust. While deputy director of administration of the Łódź Ghetto, Palfinger advocated for "a rapid dying out" of the ghetto's inhabitants.

== Holocaust activity ==
By spring 1940, Alexander Palfinger was the deputy director of administration of the Łódź Ghetto, the second-largest ghetto in all of German-occupied Europe during World War II. On 30 April 1940, when the gates closed on the ghetto, it housed 163,777 residents.

Palfinger reported to Hans Biebow, the ghetto's head of administration. Palfinger's push for a "a rapid dying out" of the ghetto's prisoners via starvation clashed with the productionist position of Biebow, who sought to transform the ghetto into a slave labor factory. Due to Palfinger's differences of opinion with Biebow, Waldemar Schön, head of the General Government's Warsaw District Resettlement Office, in December 1940 appointed Palfinger to head the newly-organized Transferstelle_Warschau (Transfer Office) in the Warsaw Ghetto.

The Transferstelle office was in charge of the flow of all goods — including food, medical supplies, and raw materials — entering and leaving the ghetto and to set prices for the sale of finished goods. Palfinger's office was also the sole arbiter in all financial transactions. Due to Palfinger's rapid hostility toward Jewish life, he insisted on curbing food shipments into the ghetto to first bleed the population of purported hidden wealth. For example, Palfinger believed that the ghetto's prisoners had violated the 1939 banking law and forbade them from bringing furniture into the ghetto.

"Given the mentality of the Jews," he argued, only the "most extreme exigency" would force them to part with their hidden valuables in return for food.

Palfinger worked in this position until May 1941, when he was appointed to head "Jewish affairs" for the new Tarnopol Ghetto in the summer of 1941.
