= Merenberg =

- Municipality
- Flag Coat of arms

- Location of Merenberg within Limburg-Weilburg district
- Interactive map of Merenberg
- Location within Germany Location within Hesse
- Coordinates: 50°31′N 8°11′E
- Country: Germany
- State: Hesse
- Admin. region: Gießen
- District: Limburg-Weilburg

Government
  - Mayor (2021–27): Oliver Jung (SPD)

Area
  - Total: 23.1 km^{2} (8.9 sq mi)
- Elevation: 253 m (830 ft)

Population (2025-12-31)
  - Total: 3,314
  - Density: 143/km^{2} (372/sq mi)
- Time zone: UTC+01:00 (CET)
  - Summer (DST): UTC+02:00 (CEST)
- Postal codes: 35799
- Dialling codes: 06471, 06476
- Vehicle registration: LM, WEL
- Website: www.merenberg.de

Merenberg is a municipality in Limburg-Weilburg district in Hesse, Germany.

== Geography ==
=== Location ===
Merenberg lies on the southern edge of the Westerwald between the district seat of Limburg and Weilburg.

=== Neighbouring communities ===
Merenberg borders in the north on the community of Mengerskirchen, in the east on the community of Löhnberg, in the south on the town of Weilburg, in the southwest on the community of Beselich, and in the west on the community of Waldbrunn (all in Limburg-Weilburg).

=== Constituent communities ===
The market community of Merenberg consists of the five centres of Merenberg, Barig-Selbenhausen, Allendorf, Reichenborn and Rückershausen.

== History ==
On both the Almerskopf and the Höhburg are found remnants of settlements from La Tène times.

In Merenberg stands the family castle of the House of Merenberg, a noble family in the 12th and 13th centuries. In connection with this family, the community had its first documentary mention in 1129. In 1290, Merenberg was granted town rights and weekly market rights by King Rudolph I, whereupon a town wall was built. In 1634 the castle was destroyed, and since then it has stood, as a ruin, as Merenberg’s landmark.

In the early 19th century, Merenberg was stripped of town rights. In the late 19th century, the House of Nassau named the children from Prince Nikolaus Wilhelm of Nassau's marriage to Pushkin's daughter the “Counts of Merenberg”.

In the course of administrative reform in Hesse, the formerly autonomous communities of Allendorf, Barig-Selbenhausen, Merenberg, Reichenborn, and Rückershausen, which had all belonged to the old Oberlahnkreis (district), merged into the new collective community of Merenberg.

Allendorf had its first documentary mention in 1250, Rückershausen in 1370 and Reichenborn in 1435.

== Politics ==
=== Community council ===
The municipal election held on 14 March 2021 yielded the following results:

Parties and voter communities		% 2021	seats 2021	% 2006	seats 2006	% 2001	seats 2001
CDU	Christian Democratic Union of Germany	26.4	6	39.7	9	36.0	8
SPD	Social Democratic Party of Germany	57.6	13	39.7	9	43.3	10
GRÜNE	Bündnis 90/Die Grünen	16,0	4	6.0	2	3.3	1
BM/FWG	Bürgerliste/Freie Wählergemeinschaft Merenberg	-	-	14.6	3	17.3	4
Total		100.0	23	100.0	23	100.0	23
voter turnout in %			51.4	54.7		57.3	

=== Coat of arms ===
The community’s arms are those formerly borne by the Lords of Merenberg, which were also represented in the old Oberlahnkreis district’s (seat: Weilburg) arms.

== Sightseeing ==
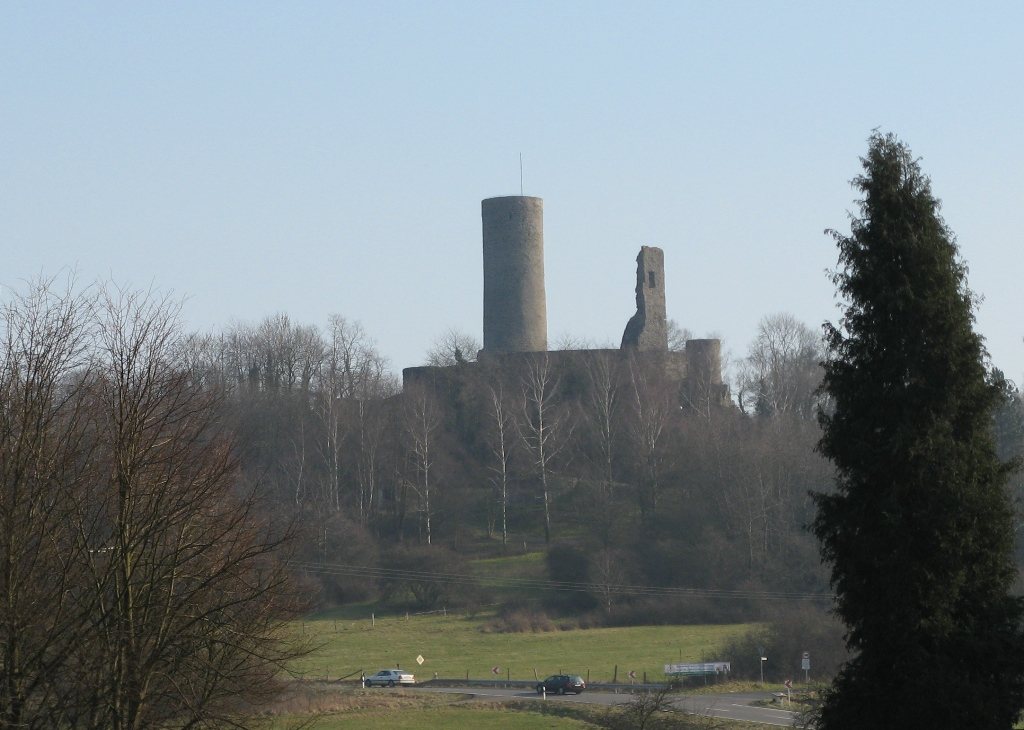
Merenberg castle ruins

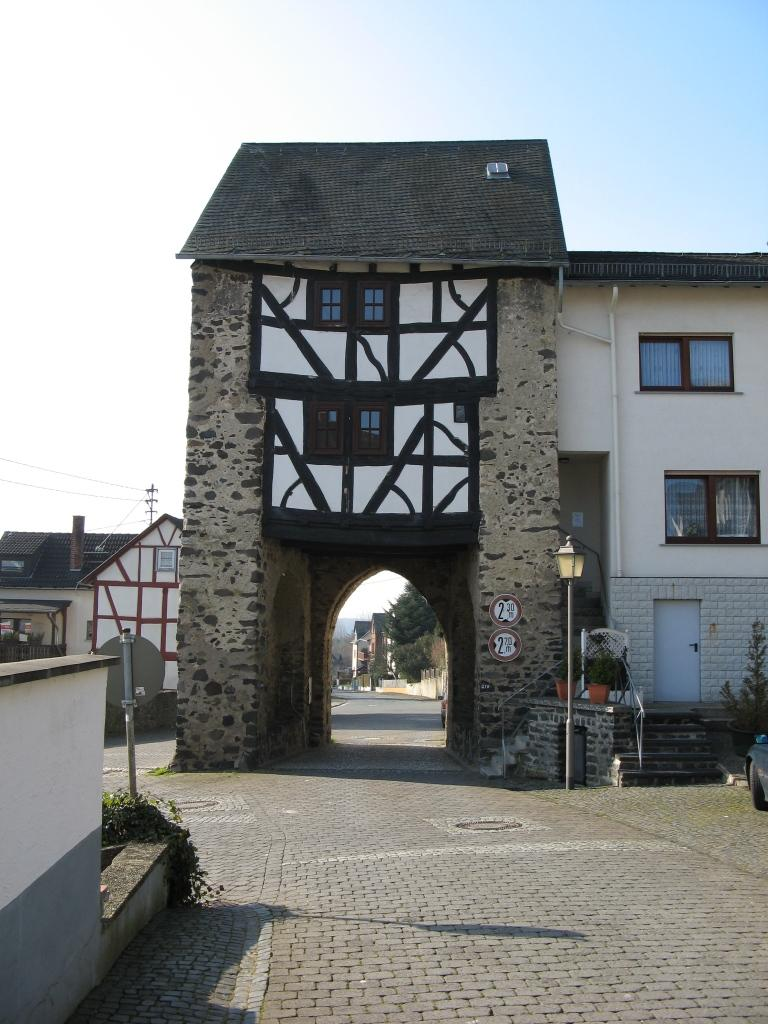
Historic town gate in Merenberg

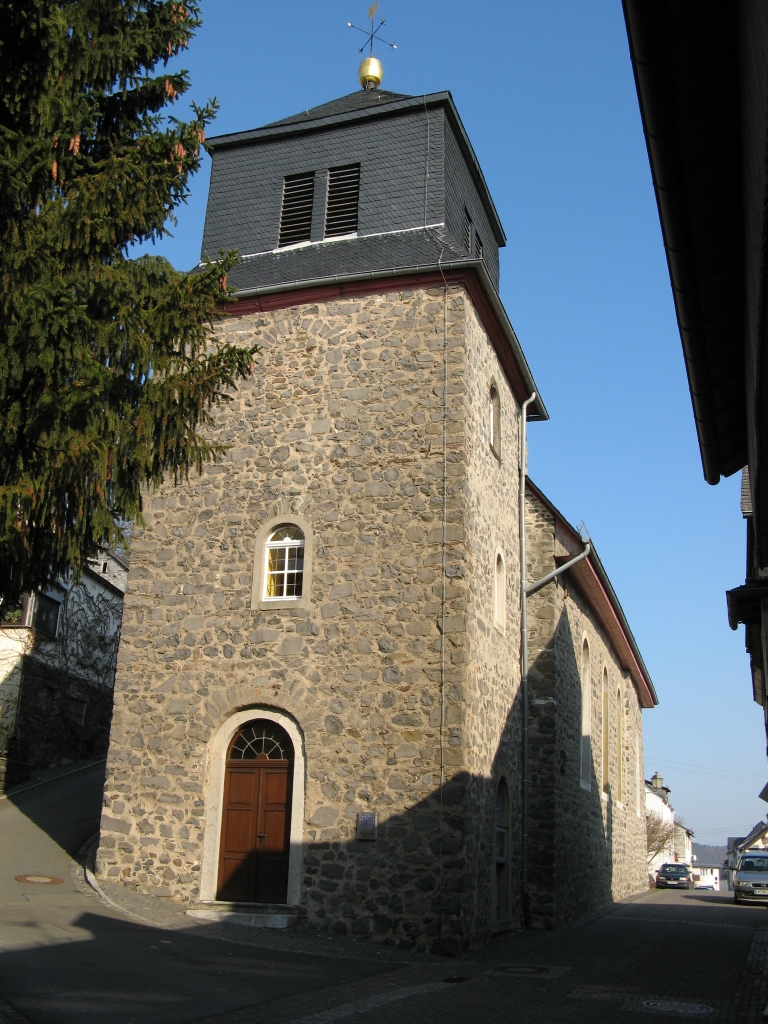
Historic Evangelical church in Merenberg

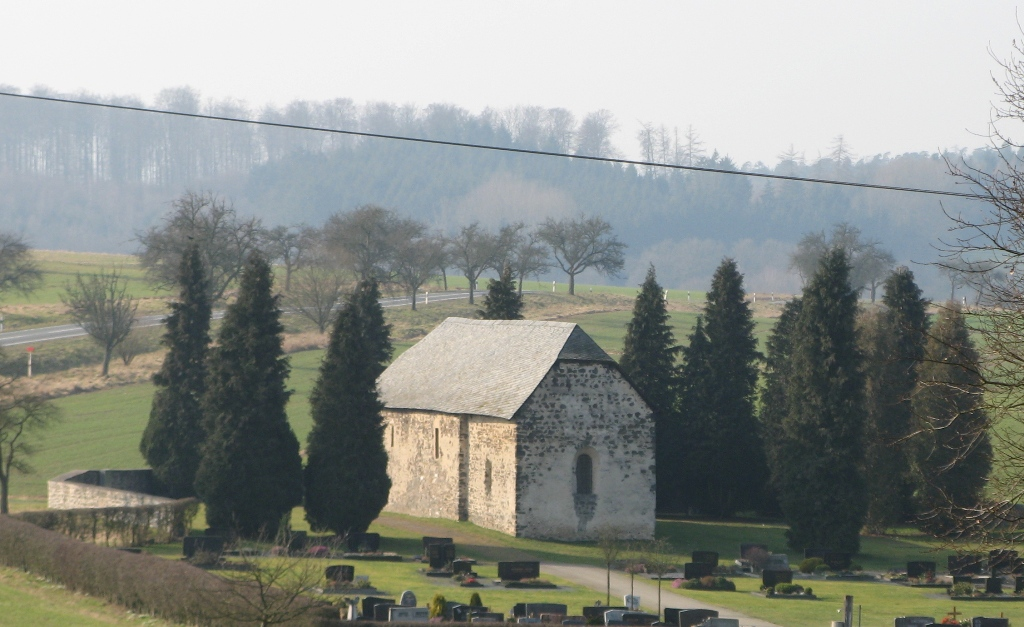
Historic Appenkirche at the current graveyard

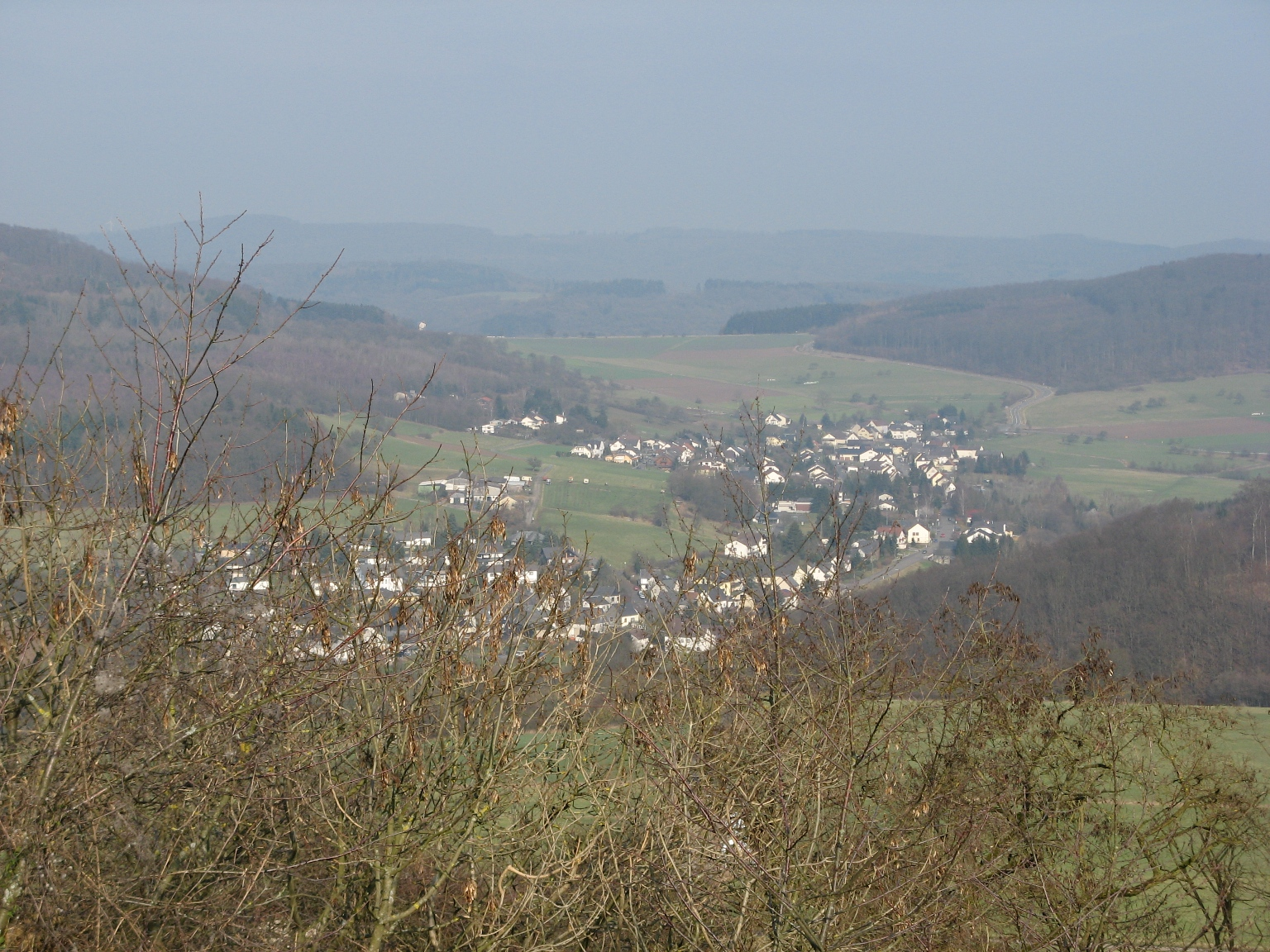
Barig-Selbenhausen
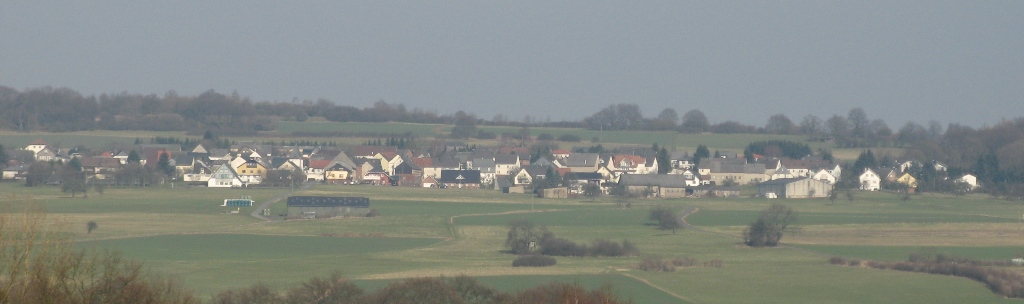
Reichenborn

== Economy and infrastructure ==
Besides the trade and crafts that are customary for such a place, there are a few small and medium-size industrial businesses. The main fields of activity are mechanical engineering, plant engineering, metalworking, plastics processing and automation. Merenberg’s best known business is the record label ZYX Music.

=== Transport ===
The community lies on Bundesstraße 49, which is currently (February 2006) being widened to four lanes between Limburg and Wetzlar, and which links Merenberg to the long-distance road network.

=== Education ===
Merenberg has, with its Albert-Wagner-Schule, a primary school and a Hauptschule. In 1958, it was dedicated as the first Mittelpunktschule (“midpoint school”, a central school, designed to eliminate smaller outlying schools) in Hesse. It was named after the administrative official and politician Albert Wagner. Merenberg lies in the feeder area of the Westerwaldschule, a Hauptschule-Realschule in Mengerskirchen-Waldernbach. Moreover, students from Merenberg attend other secondary schools in Weilburg.

=== Public institutions ===
- Kindertagesstätte "Villa Kunterbunt" Merenberg (daycare)
- Kindergarten "Tigerente" Barig-Selbenhausen
- Merenberg Volunteer Fire Brigade, founded 1902 (includes Youth Fire Brigade)
- Allendorf Volunteer Fire Brigade, founded 1926 (includes Youth Fire Brigade)
- Barig-Selbenhausen Volunteer Fire Brigade, founded 1925 (includes Youth Fire Brigade)
- Reichenborn Volunteer Fire Brigade, founded 1925 (includes Youth Fire Brigade)
- Rückershausen Volunteer Fire Brigade, founded 1934 (includes Youth Fire Brigade)

== Notable residents ==
- Wilhelm Dörr (1921-1945), SS and concentration camp officer executed for war crimes
