= Wilhelm Dörr (Nazi) =

German SS soldier and concentration camp guard (1921–1945)

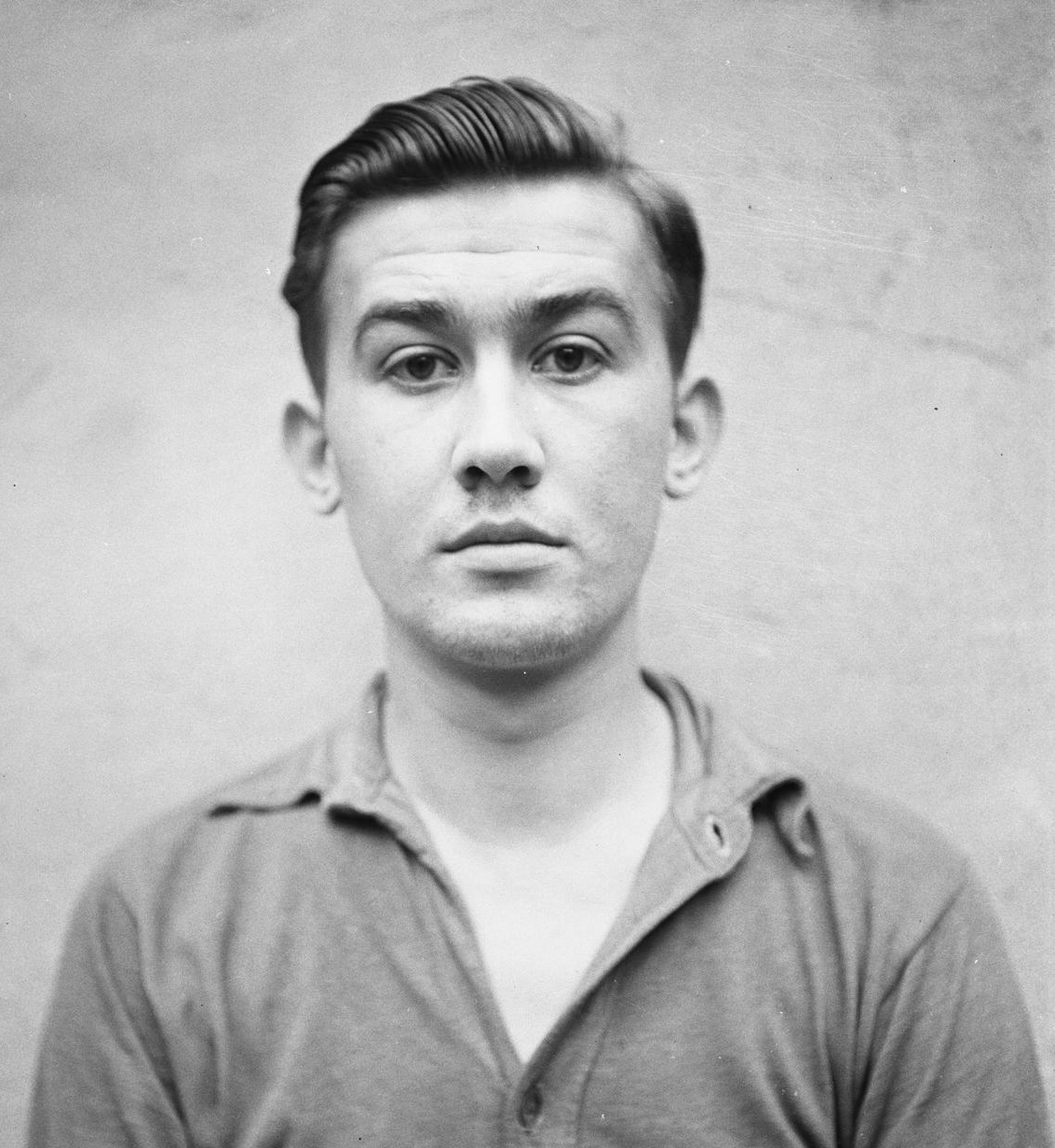
- Dörr in British custody (1945)
- Born: 9 February 1921; Merenberg, Germany
- Died: 13 December 1945 (aged 24); Hamelin Prison, Allied-occupied Germany
- Status: Executed by hanging
- Motive: Nazism
- Conviction: War crimes
- Trial: Belsen trial
- Penalty: Death
- Military career
- Allegiance: Nazi Germany
- Branch: Schutzstaffel
- Rank: Oberscharführer
- Unit: SS-Totenkopfverbände
- Conflicts: World War II

Wilhelm Dörr (9 February 1921 – 13 December 1945) was a German SS-Oberscharführer and concentration camp officer. He served as a guard at the Mittelbau-Dora concentration camp and as deputy commander of the sub-camp of Kleinbodungen. Following World War II he was convicted of war crimes by British occupation authorities in the Belsen Trial and executed.

== Life ==
Wilhelm Dörr was born in the town of Merenberg on February 9, 1921, and raised in Emmerichenhain (Rennerod) where he worked primarily as a farmhand. Dörr was a member of the Hitler Youth from 1932 to 1939 and volunteered for the Waffen-SS in December 1940 after being rejected for service by the Wehrmacht. While training to become a combat engineer in Dresden in October 1941 he became seriously ill with rheumatism and was confined to a hospital for several months. Following his recovery, Dörr was reassigned to the SS-Totenkopfverbände in the summer of 1942. He went on to serve as a guard at the Sachsenhausen concentration camp until December 1943.

In January 1944 Dörr was transferred to the Mittelbau-Dora concentration camp where he functioned as a Blockführer (Block Leader) in the main camp area before being appointed deputy to Hauptscharführer Franz Stofel, commander of the satellite-camp of Kleinbodungen in September 1944.

At Kleinbodungen, Dörr helped manage roughly 620 camp inmates used as slave-laborers in Mittelwerk, the armaments production facility used to manufacture Germany's V-2 ballistic missiles. When US troops appeared poised to capture Mittelbau-Dora and its environs in April 1945, the evacuation of the camp was ordered. Dörr was one of 45 SS men who led a brutal death march of hundreds of Kleinbodungen inmates to the Bergen-Belsen concentration camp in Lower Saxony. During the journey the SS conducted numerous summary executions of prisoners who attempted to escape or otherwise slowed the progress of the march.

Four days after Dörr and his group arrived at Bergen-Belsen the camp was liberated by British troops. He was arrested and indicted for the atrocities which had occurred during the death march from Mittelbau-Dora. Dörr was tried along with 45 other alleged war criminals before a British military court in Lüneburg as part of the so-called Belsen Trial. He pleaded not guilty to the charges but was convicted and sentenced to death. Dörr was executed by hanging in Hamelin Prison on 13 December 1945. His executioner was Albert Pierrepoint, aided by an assistant.
