= Fritz Klein =

Nazi physician (1888–1945)

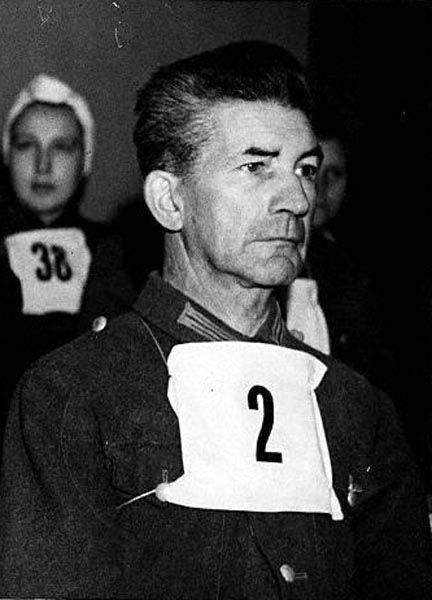
- Klein at his trial in 1945
- Born: 24 November 1888; Feketehalom, Austria-Hungary
- Died: 13 December 1945 (aged 57); Hamelin Prison, Allied-occupied Germany
- Status: Executed by hanging
- Motive: Nazism
- Conviction: War crimes
- Trial: Belsen trial
- Penalty: Death

Details
- Victims: Thousands
- Span of crimes: 1943–1944
- Country: Poland
- Location: Auschwitz concentration camp
- Military career
- Allegiance: Nazi Germany
- Branch: Schutzstaffel

Fritz Klein (24 November 1888 – 13 December 1945) was a Romanian-German Nazi doctor and war criminal, hanged for his role in atrocities at Auschwitz concentration camp and Bergen-Belsen concentration camp during the Holocaust.

== Early life, education, and Nazi soldier ==
Klein was born in Feketehalom, Austria-Hungary (now Codlea in central Romania).

Klein was considered a Volksdeutscher, or ethnic German. He studied medicine at the University of Budapest and completed his military service in Romania, finishing his studies in Budapest after World War I. He lived and worked as a doctor in Siebenbürgen (Transylvania), Romania.

In 1939, as a Romanian citizen, he was drafted into the Romanian army, where, after the outbreak of the war with the Soviet Union in 1941, he served as a paramedic on the eastern front. In May 1943, Romanian fascist dictator Marshal Antonescu, on a demand from Hitler to release ethnic Germans in the Romanian Army, drafted them into the German army. Hence Klein became a Nazi soldier in the Waffen-SS, was listed in the SS-Personalhauptamt, and posted to Yugoslavia.

== Nazi camp doctor and execution ==
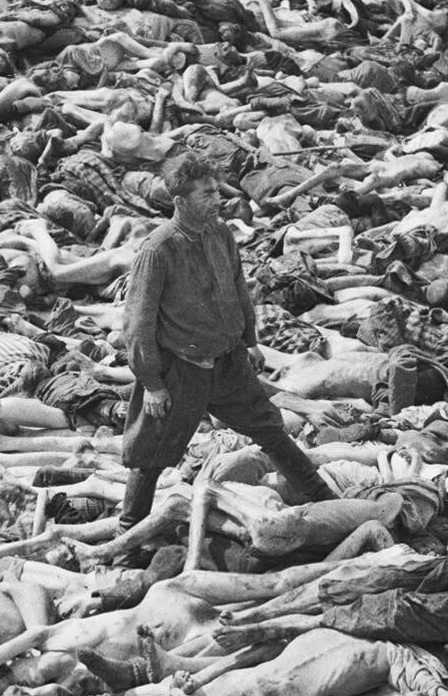
Klein surrounded by bodies. The British Army liberating Bergen-Belsen forced German camp personnel to bury the corpses of prisoners.

On 15 December 1943, he arrived in Auschwitz concentration camp, where at first he served as a camp doctor in the women’s camp in Birkenau. Subsequently, he worked as a camp doctor in the Gypsy camp. He also participated in numerous selections ("Selektionen") on the ramp. In December 1944 he was transferred to Neuengamme concentration camp, from where he was sent to Bergen-Belsen concentration camp in January 1945. He remained at the camp with commandant Josef Kramer and assisted in handing it over to British troops. Klein was imprisoned and forced to help bury all unburied corpses in mass graves. The British Army Film and Photographic Unit Number 5 photographed Klein standing in a mass grave, in a well-known 1945 photo (seen on the left).

Klein and 44 other camp staff were tried in the Belsen Trial by a British military court at Lüneburg. The trial lasted several weeks, from September to November 1945. During the trial Anita Lasker testified that Klein took part in selections for the gas chamber.

Klein was sentenced to death and hanged at Hamelin prison by Albert Pierrepoint on 13 December 1945.
