= Erich Zoddel =

German criminal (1913–1945)

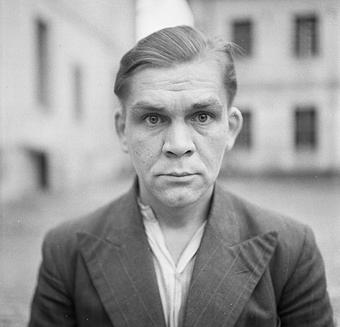
- Born: 9 August 1913; Berlin, Kingdom of Prussia, German Empire
- Died: 30 November 1945 (aged 32); Wolfenbüttel Prison, Allied-occupied Germany
- Cause of death: Execution by guillotine
- Status: Executed
- Motive: Romantic rejection
- Convictions: War crimes Murder; Theft
- Trial: Belsen trial
- Penalty: Death

Details
- Victims: Maria Konatkwicz
- Date: 18 April 1945
- Country: Allied-occupied Germany
- Location: Bergen-Belsen concentration camp

Erich Zoddel (9 August 1913 – 30 November 1945) was a prisoner functionary at the Bergen-Belsen concentration camp. In 1941, Zoddel was sentenced to a year in prison for theft before being transferred to Sachsenhausen concentration camp in 1942. He worked as a forced laborer in the Heinkel factory in Oranienburg until October 1943. In November 1943, after a brief stay at Buchenwald concentration camp, he was taken to Mittelbau-Dora concentration camp. On 27 March 1944, Zoddel and 1,000 other prisoners from Mittelbau-Dora arrived at Bergen-Belsen. By January 1945, Zoddel had risen in the ranks to a camp division. On 18 April 1945, after the liberation of Bergen-Belsen by the British army, Zoddel shot a female detainee named Maria Konatkwicz.

During questioning, Zoddel described Konatkwicz as his girlfriend. However, another inmate said Zoddel had threatened to kill Konatkwicz for rejecting his romantic advances. Konatkwicz had said she would not date Zoddel since he was German and she was Polish.

During his murder trial, Zoddel's lawyer tried to refute the testimony of witnesses against him. He also argued that even if Zoddel killed Konatkwicz, he may have just wanted to frighten her, so he should only be convicted of manslaughter.

These defenses were rejected, and Zoddel was found convicted of murder. He was sentenced to death by a military court in Celle on 31 August 1945. On 17 November 1945, Zoddel was sentenced to life imprisonment in a second trial for his actions at Bergen-Belsen. A court said he had violently abused his fellow prisoners there, often badly beating them with sticks. His death sentence for murdering Konatkwicz was carried out later that month in Wolfenbüttel by guillotine. He was not hanged since his murder conviction was under German civilian code.

== Bibliography ==
- United Nations War Crimes Commission (Hrsg.): Law reports of trials of war criminals, selected and prepared by the United Nations War Crimes Commission. 3 Bände, William S. Hein Publishing, Buffalo (New York) 1997, ISBN 1-57588-403-8 (Reprint der Originalausgabe von 1947 bis 1949)
- Arne Moi: Das Lager – ein Norweger in Bergen-Belsen. Vandenhoeck & Ruprecht, Göttingen 2002, ISBN 3-525-35133-X
