= Irene Haschke =

German SS guard during World War II (born 1921)

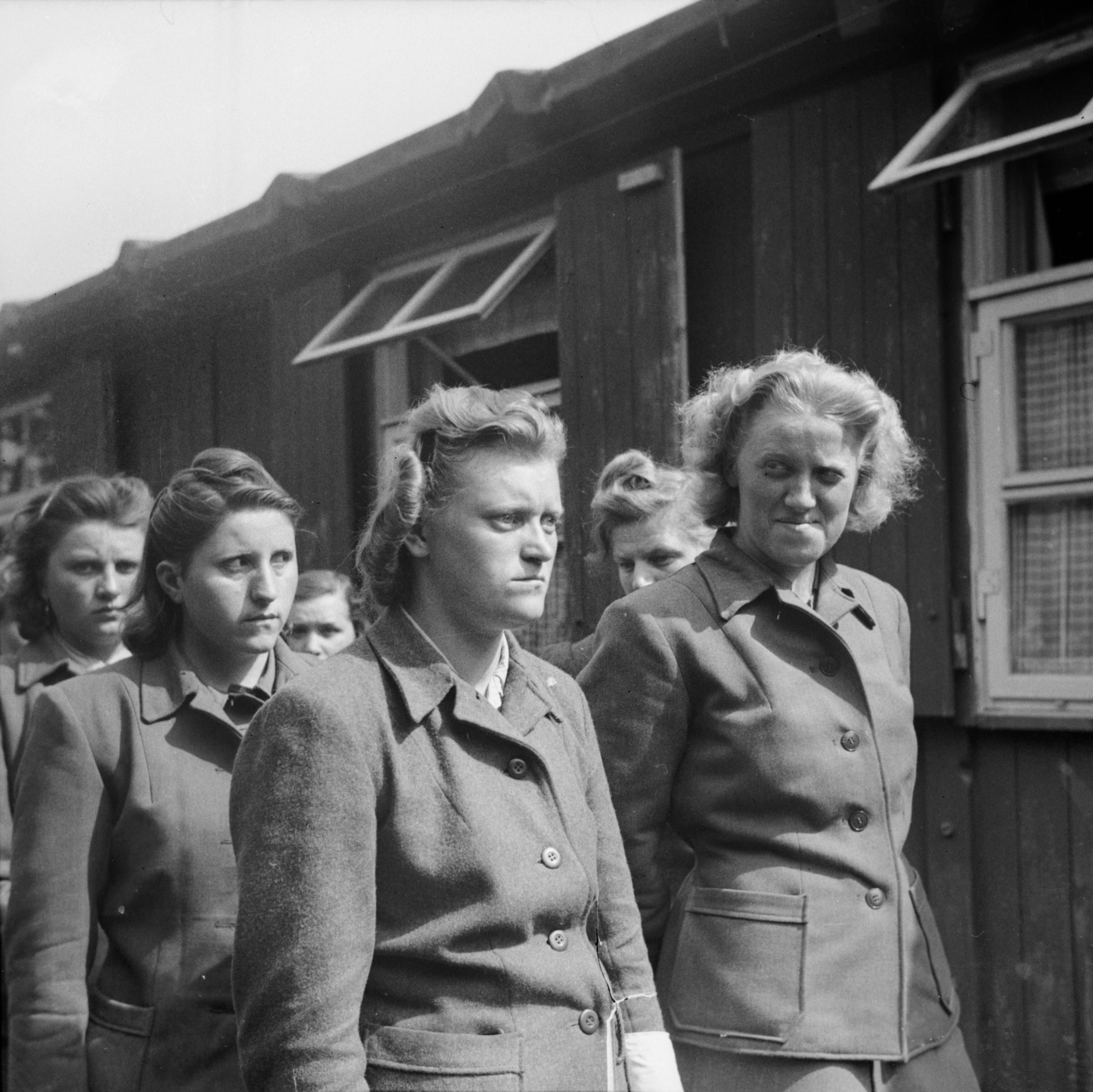
- SS women camp guards are paraded for work in clearing the dead. Irene Haschke is in the centre of the picture, at the front of the group, with Herta Bothe to her left.
- Born: 16 February 1921; Friedeberg, Neumark
- Occupation: SS camp guard
- Conviction: War crimes
- Trial: Belsen trial
- Penalty: 10 years imprisonment

Irene Haschke (born 16 February 1921) was a German SS camp guard within the Nazi concentration camp system during World War II, notably, at the Bergen-Belsen camp in what is today Lower Saxony in northern Germany, southwest of the town of Bergen near Celle. She was born in Friedeberg, Neumark in what is now Poland.

== Concentration camp service and post-war trial ==
Haschke worked in a textile factory until 16 August 1944, when she was recruited by the Schutzstaffel, more commonly known as the SS, and sent to the Gross-Rosen concentration camp for five weeks for training as a guard, or Aufseherin.

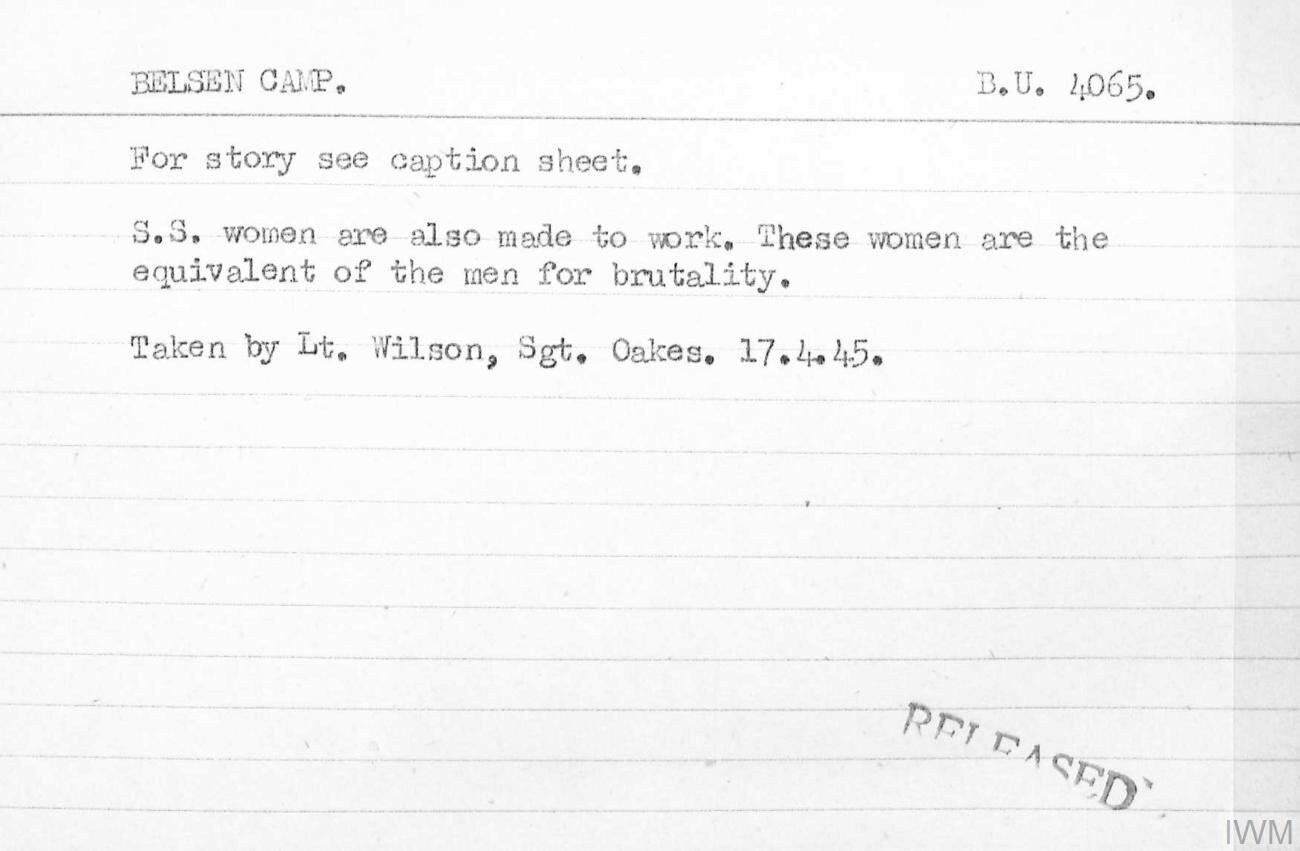
"These women are the equivalent of the men for brutality."

She was transferred to the Mährisch-Weißwasser camp, at Bílá Voda in the Sudetenland, for three weeks as SS Aufseherin. Later she returned to the textile factory for a time but was removed on 15 February 1945 and sent to Bergen-Belsen concentration camp, arriving on 28 February 1945.

Haschke was captured by the British Army on 15 April 1945 and ordered to bury the dead. On 17 September 1945 she was brought to trial by the British in the Bergen-Belsen trial, where the Court accused Josef Kramer and another 44 people, who worked in Auschwitz and Belsen, of war crimes. This trial was held at 30 Lindenstraße (Lime Street), in Lunenburg. On 17 November 1945 she was convicted and sentenced to 10 years for her participation in these crimes and was released on 21 December 1951.
