= Walter Quakernack =

German Nazi war criminal (1907–1946)

Walter Friedrich Wilhelm Quakernack (9 July 1907 – 11 October 1946) was a German Oberscharführer in the SS during the Nazi era. His SS membership number was 125266. He was tried for war crimes at the second Belsen Trial and executed. Quakernack is mentioned several times in the account of Filip Müller, who worked in a Sonderkommando at Auschwitz and was an eyewitness.

== SS career ==
Quakernack was born in Bielefeld, Germany. He served as a secretary in the Politische Abteilung at Auschwitz concentration camp beginning in June 1940, where he participated in mass murders using the Genickschuss method of firing one bullet into the back of the neck, established by SS-Untersturmführer Maximilian Grabner.

Quakernack worked as a team leader in the crematorium at Auschwitz and participated in the gassing of Soviet POWs at the end of 1941. In September 1942, he was promoted to Oberscharführer and awarded the Kriegsverdienstkreuz (War Merit Cross), in September 1943. He was further promoted camp commandant in April 1944 at Arbeitslager Laurahütte, a subcamp of Auschwitz in Siemianowice Śląskie. He also worked at Auschwitz III, known as Monowitz. During his time in Auschwitz, he was known to personally kill prisoners by having them led to a big warehouse, which Quackernack would then also enter under the influence of alcohol. He would then use an MP 40 machine pistol and fire at the prisoners until they were all dead. Former member of a Sonderkommando unit, who were tasked with removing the bodies on trucks and taking them to the crematorium, recalled that Quackernack stood in the middle of the warehouse, surrounded by dead bodies, holding a smoking gun, with his uniform entirely red from blood and laughing loudly. Quackernack was often drunk, which led to numerous outbursts of anger.

On 23 January 1945 he accompanied a death march of 500 prisoners from Auschwitz to the Hanover-Mühlenberg concentration camp arriving around 3 February 1945. On 8 April 1945 he was part of a death march evacuation from Mühlenberg to Bergen-Belsen.

== Trial and execution ==
Quakernack was arrested by Allied forces and held at Celle and Lüneburg. He was sentenced to death at the second Belsen Trial in June 1946. He was hanged on 11 October 1946.
