= Helmut Pfeiffer =

SS officer and German lawyer

Helmut Roland Heinrich Pfeiffer
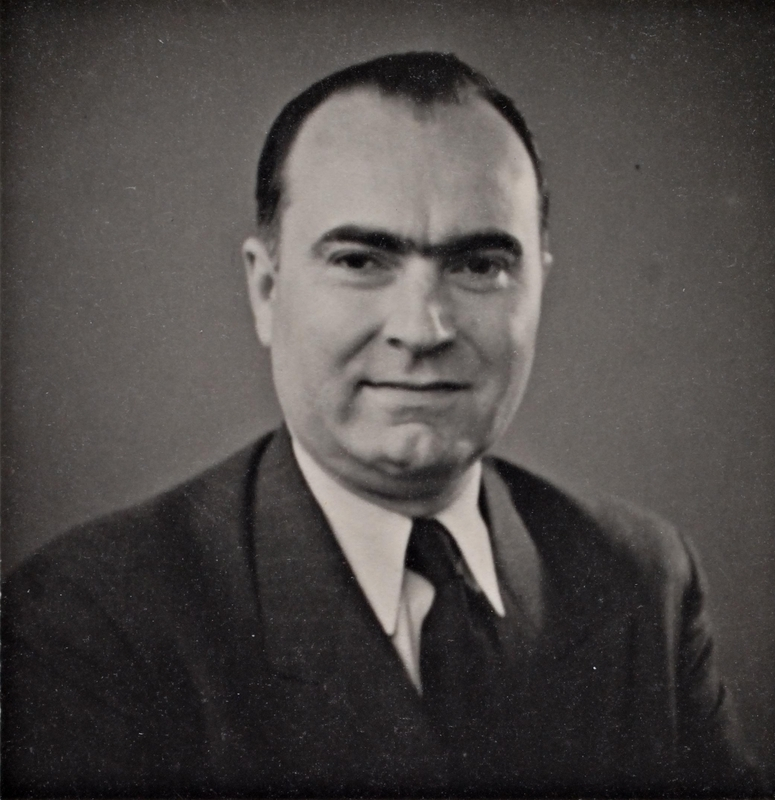
- Born: November 2, 1907; Westphalia, Prussia, German Empire
- Died: April 17, 1945 (aged 37); Copenhagen, Denmark
- Education: University of Cologne
- Occupations: Lawyer; SS Officer

Helmut Roland Heinrich Pfeiffer (November 2, 1907 – April 17, 1945) was a German lawyer and SS officer who rescued people hunted by the Nazi regime.

== Professional career ==
Pfeiffer was born in Eiringhausen, near Plettenberg in Westphalia (Germany) the only child of commercial manager Heinrich Pfeiffer and his wife Selma, née Breddermann. After passing his exams at Grammar school in Altena, he studied Law at Cologne University. He obtained a Master's degree (Referendarexamen) in 1931 and in 1935 he successfully completed his bar examinations (Assessorexamen).

From 1932 he was CEO of NSDAP Gaurechtsamt South-Westphalia and additionally in 1933 legal adviser to the Reich Labour Service District (Gau) 20B. From 1934 he was Organisationswalter of NS-Rechtswahrerbund and afterwards was promoted to Hauptstellenleiter at National HQ of NSDAP im Reichsrechtsamt. From 1934 he worked as an unpaid adviser to the Organisation of Industrial Commerce, and became chairman of an arbitration body for metal industries.

From November 1, 1939, Pfeiffer was head of the Department of Economy (Hauptabteilung Wirtschaft) of the Berlin Bureau of the Occupied Polish Territories, whose head, Reichsamtsleiter Dr. Wilhelm Heuber, had plenipotentiary power for the Governor General of the Occupied Polish Territories.

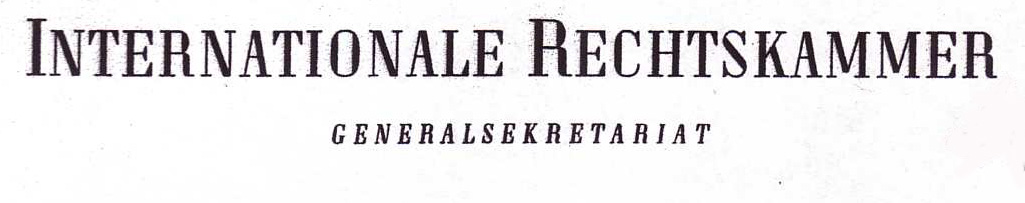
1941

After the foundation of the International Chamber of Law in 1941 he was appointed its first general secretary. This organisation was founded by Hans Frank. Temporarily based in the building of the Nationalsozialistischer Rechtswahrerbund (20/21 Tiergartenstrasse, Berlin) it moved to permanent quarters at 27 Unter den Linden. From November 1941, Pfeiffer was SS-leader with the staff of SS-Hauptamt and from November 1942, an SS-leader with the Reich Security Main Office (RSHA). In winter 1944 he was an SS-Hauptsturmführer (captain) with RSHA Amt VI-III-Kult.

Alongside his career in the Nazi Party, he had a private legal practice, which provided him with the cover for his rescue activities.

== Political career ==
In 1927 as a student at Cologne University, Pfeiffer came into contact with National Socialism. From 1929 to 1931 he spent his university holidays as a legal counsellor to the local NSDAP-Ortsgruppenleiter. He joined the party on 1 February 1932 (Membership no. 894.201). He was probably a member of the Storm Detachment (Sturmabteilung - SA) between 1933 and 1934.

In November 9, 1938, thanks to a recommendation by Senior Group Leader (SS-Obergruppenführer) Friedrich-Wilhelm Krüger, Pfeiffer joined the Protection Squadron (SS) (membership no 310.479) with the rank of a SS-Hauptsturmführer (Captain).

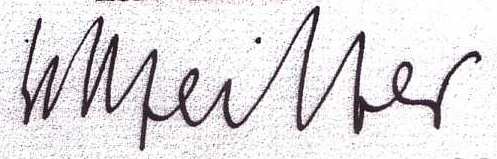
1942

Pfeiffer was a student of the constitutional legal scientist Carl Schmitt and later on worked closely and socialised with him. Pfeiffer also worked for and got to know well the future Reichsminister Hans Frank (from 1941, the Governor-General of the General Government for the Occupied Polish Territories): first at the Rechtswahrerbund, then within the General Government and finally at the International Chamber of Law.

Early in summer of 1943 Pfeiffer was involved in communicating to the Nazi Government a separate treaty proposal by Joseph Stalin as can be read in the memoirs of Henry Picker: "When I was ordered by Bormann to see him in his residency at Obersalzberg to discuss my planned publication of "Hitler's Table Talks", I overcame my fear and informed him about a separate treaty proposal by Stalin which had been sent by Stalin to Stockholm. I did so at a request of a Berlin friend, the General Secretary of the International Rechtskammer, Dr. Helmut Pfeiffer."

== Rescue operations ==
In the autumn of 1942, the Berlin Jewish pharmacist Dr. Ernst Silten was told "that [Pfeiffer] would be able to prevent my deportation, if it was claimed that I was working on projects of economic importance." His long-time business-partner, Lubeckian industrialist Dr. Heinrich Dräger, hired Helmut Pfeiffer to organise this, but before it could be arranged Dr. Ernst Silten committed suicide in March 1943 when the Gestapo came to arrest him.

In 1938, Ernst Silten's son Dr. Fritz Silten had already emigrated from Germany, together with his wife Ilse, their daughter Gabriele and his mother, and had settled in Amsterdam. After the occupation of the Netherlands by the German Wehrmacht, their planned emigration to Argentina was refused. In June 1943 the family was deported to the Westerbork transit camp, and in January 1944, to the Theresienstadt ghetto. Using his contacts, Pfeiffer sought to prevent or delay their deportation. Thanks to this and Dr. Dräger's efforts, Fritz, Ilse and Gabriele Silten eventually survived the Nazi regime.

Pfeiffer attempted to rescue not only the Siltens but also the attorney Dr. Philipp Kozower (1894–1944), board member of Berlin's Jewish community, who was deported to Theresienstadt in January 1943, with his wife and three young children. Unfortunately, Pfeiffer's efforts in this case came too late; in autumn of 1944 the family had already been deported to the Auschwitz concentration camp and had been murdered.

With Danish lawyer Erik Reitzel Nielsen, Pfeiffer worked for the release of Danish textile merchant Willy Levysohn (1889–1944) from Theresienstadt after his arrest in August 1943. Most Danish Jews, including his wife and two children, managed to escape by September 30, 1943. Levysohn was transported to Theresienstadt on October 14, 1943 (in transport XXV/3) and died from "pneumonia" the following March.

There are a few more reports about Pfeiffer's activities which appear reliable though remain unverified: in 1942, or 1943, Pfeiffer sued Gestapo members in Poland who had stolen the property of a so-called 'Non-Aryan'. Consequently, the Gestapo reported Pfeiffer for this act.

Pfeiffer got involved with the approximately 2000 Danish policemen who, in September 1944, had been arrested and deported by the German occupation forces, first to the Neuengamme concentration camp and further on to Buchenwald. Details of his activities are not known yet, but his intervention was repeatedly mentioned in the report of the Danish congressional investigation committee dated October 25, 1950.

Another account of his rescue activities is a witness report by Dr. Mirjana Tomljenovic-Markovic, but due to a lack of further evidence this has so far not been confirmed: his last attempt to save people involved four Polish subjects (names unknown), three of them Jewish, whom he had already smuggled into Denmark. In April 1945 he unsuccessfully attempted to flee with them to Sweden. They were also transported to Gestapo HQ in Copenhagen and then to Vestre Prison, where it was intended to execute them on April 27, 1945. However, because of the increasing disorganisation of the Third Reich, these executions did not take place.

Due to insufficient written proof of evidence, Helmut Pfeiffer, so far, has not been included in respective databases and memorials to rescuers.

== Military career ==
Initially Pfeiffer was considered unfit for active service because of a cardiac defect. As the war progressed he occupied "protected positions" that prevented him for being called up (so called 'uk'). Around the beginning of 1944, his exemption from military service was cancelled due to doubts about his political soundness. Even so, he was able to postpone being called up for a while. When he was eventually called up for SS tank destroyer troop training- and replacement-unit 1 (Rastenburg, East Prussia) on January 5, 1945, he planned his escape to Denmark.

== Last weeks and death ==
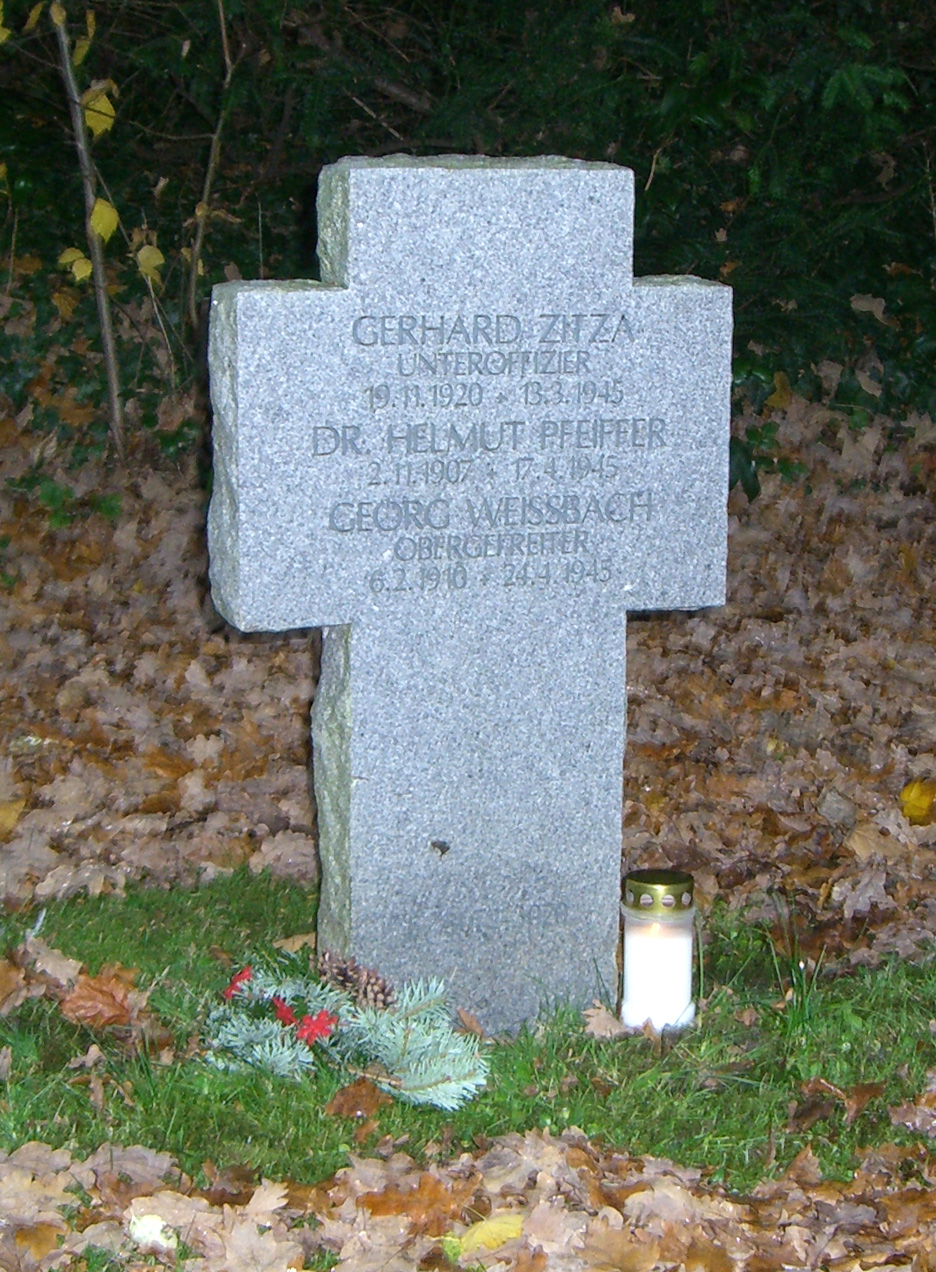
Pfeiffers Grab

Friends arranged a fake appendectomy in a Copenhagen hospital to protect him from being arrested by the Gestapo. His stay in hospital was even prolonged with pyrogenic drugs. On the night of April 10/11, 1945, he tried to escape to Sweden by boat, but in vain. The boat was captured either by water police or by the marine coast-guard. Pfeiffer and his comrades were taken to Gestapo-HQ (Dagmar House) and subsequently transferred to Vestre Prison. On April 17, 1945, he was found strangled in his cell. Pfeiffer is buried in Copenhagen's Vestre Kirkegaard (E / 1 / 3071 1314). His grave is looked after by the German War Graves Commission.

His client, Heinrich Dräger, successfully hid his involvement with the rescue of Jews until the end of World War II.

== Decorations ==
- Honour Chevron for the Old Guard
- Nazi Party Long Service Award in Bronze
- War Merit Cross, 2nd class
- Knight's Cross of the Royal Danish Order of the Dannebrog (1940–1945)

== Publications by Helmut Pfeiffer ==
- Der Versicherungsmakler. Inaugural-Dissertation, Rechtswissenschaftliche Fakultät der Universität Köln, Würzburg 1932
- Rechtsaufklärung. In: Unser Wille und Weg/Heft 5, Mai 1939, Seite 113. Monatsblätter der Reichspropagandaleitung der NSDAP. Die parteiamtliche Propagandazeitschrift der NSDAP. Publisher: Dr. J. Goebbels.
- Tagungsbericht der internationalen Juristenbesprechung in Berlin vom 3. bis 5. April 1941 aus Anlass der Gründung der internationalen Rechtskammer. Publisher: Helmut Pfeiffer, Deutscher Rechtsverlag, 1941
- Das Generalgouvernement und seine Wirtschaft. Published by Staatssekretär Dr. Josef Bühler, Chef des Amtes des Generalgouverneurs, Reichsamtsleiter Dr. Wilhelm Heuber, Bevollmächtigter des Generalgouverneurs in Berlin. Edited by Lawyer Dr. Helmut Pfeiffer, Leiter der Wirtschaftsabteilung des Bevollmächtigten des Generalgouverneurs in Berlin. Deutscher Verlag für Politik und Wirtschaft, Abteilung Wirtschaftsordnung, Berlin-Halensee, Loseblattsammlung: 1940, Ergänzungen 1941
- Die Aufgaben der Internationalen Rechtskammer. In: Arch. f. Urheber-, Film- und Theaterrecht 15, 1, 2-5 (1942) Archiv der Internationalen Rechtskammer 1942 / mit einem Geleitwort von Dr. Ohnesorge; edited and prepared by Helmut Pfeiffer. Berlin. Jamrowski. 1943. 174 S
- Organisationsbericht. In: Protokoll der Arbeitssitzung der internationalen Rechtskammer, Hohe Tatra, Juni 1943, Copied typoscript.
