= Groß Hehlen =

- Stadtteil of Celle
- Interactive map of Groß Hehlen
- Location within Germany Location within Lower Saxony
- Coordinates: 52°39′16″N 10°03′40″E
- Country: Germany
- State: Lower Saxony
- District: Celle
- Town: Celle
- Elevation: 56 m (184 ft)

Population (2020-12-31)
  - Total: 2,846
- Time zone: UTC+01:00 (CET)
  - Summer (DST): UTC+02:00 (CEST)
- Postal codes: 29221, 29223, 29225, 29227 and 29229
- Dialling codes: 05141

Groß Hehlen is a village north of the town of Celle in the German state of Lower Saxony. It is linked to the town via the K 27 district road which joins the main B 3 federal highway from Bergen. Groß Hehlen is linked to its neighbouring village of Scheuen to the north via the L 240.

== Politics ==
The chair of the parish council is Axel Fuchs (CDU). (as at March 2009)

== Culture and places of interest ==
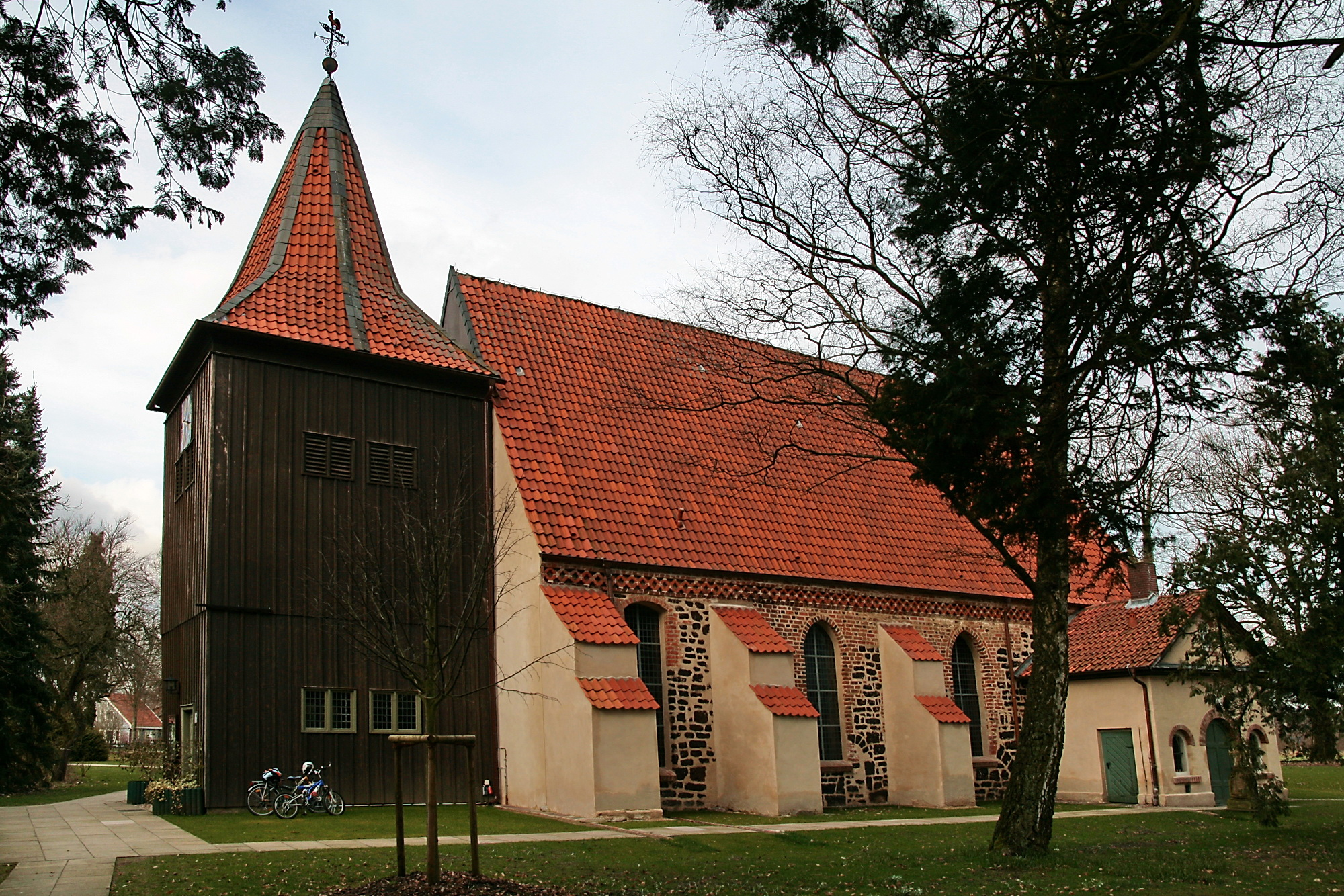
St.Cyriacus Church

The Church of St. Cyriacus is already mentioned in one of the oldest records of the village dating to 1235. The former clock tower collapsed in 1634 and was rebuilt in 1703. The nave was widened in 1640 and from 1963 to 1964 the church was extensively modernised. During the renovation work inside the church, valuable wall paintings, believed to stem from the 15th century, were discovered.
