= Franz Hössler =

German SS officer (1906–1945)

Franz Hössler Franz Hößler
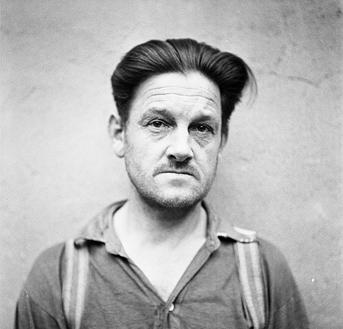
- Franz Hößler in British custody, August 1945
- Born: 4 February 1906; Oberdorf, German Empire
- Died: 13 December 1945 (aged 39); Hamelin Prison, Allied-occupied Germany
- Status: Executed
- Conviction: War crimes
- Trial: Belsen trial
- Penalty: Death
- Military career
- Allegiance: Nazi Germany
- Branch: Schutzstaffel
- Service years: 1933–45
- Rank: SS-Obersturmführer
- Service number: NSDAP #1,374,713; SS #41,940
- Unit: SS-Totenkopfverbände
- Commands: Schutzhaftlagerführer Auschwitz; Schutzhaftlagerführer Mittelwerk; Schutzhaftlagerführer Bergen-Belsen

Franz Hößler, also Franz Hössler (German: [ˈfʁants ˈhœslɐ]; 4 February 1906 – 13 December 1945) was a Nazi German SS-Obersturmführer and Schutzhaftlagerführer at the Auschwitz-Birkenau, Dora-Mittelbau and Bergen-Belsen concentration camps during World War II. Captured by the Allies at the end of the war, Hößler was charged with war crimes in the First Bergen-Belsen Trial, found guilty, and sentenced to death. He was executed by hanging at Hamelin Prison in 1945.

== Early life ==
Hößler was born in 1906 in Oberdorf, a village in the municipality of Martinszell im Allgäu, in the Schwabenland of the German Empire. The son of a foreman, he quit school early to become a photographer. Later employed as a warehouse worker, he was unemployed during the Great Depression of the 1930s. He joined the Nazi Party in early November 1932 (member no. 1,374,713) and the SS (member no. 41,940). Hößler was married and had three children.

During his time in the SS, Hößler rose to the rank of SS-Obersturmführer and became a reserve officer in the Waffen-SS. After the establishment of the Dachau concentration camp in July 1933, he became the first member of the guard staff and worked later as a cook. He served at Dachau until after the outbreak of World War II.

== Auschwitz ==
In June 1940, Hößler was transferred to the newly opened Auschwitz I concentration camp as it received the first mass transports. He managed the camp kitchens and was occasionally used as a subcamp supervisor (German: Kommandoführer). He then became a Work Service Leader (German: Arbeitsdienstführer) at the camp in early 1941. On 28 July 1941, Hößler accompanied a shipment of 575 selected Auschwitz I inmates to the euthanasia center at Sonnenstein Castle, where they were murdered as part of the Action 14f13 program. In June 1942, Hößler, together with Otto Moll and Hans Aumeier, participated in killing 168 survivors of a failed uprising in the punishment section of Auschwitz I. For a few months during 1942 he was also responsible for the construction of a holiday resort for the SS in Żywiec, the so-called "Solahütte".

After Auschwitz-Birkenau was formally expanded into an extermination camp in 1942, Hößler took on various commands there. From September to November 1942, a brigade composed of prisoners called Sonderkommando Hößler exhumed 107,000 corpses from mass graves around Auschwitz I in order to burn them in the new Auschwitz II crematoria. The prisoners of the Sonderkommando were then almost invariably murdered after the action. To conduct this disposal, Hößler, along with Rudolf Höß and Walter Dejaco, had previously visited the Chelmno extermination camp on 16 September 1942 to observe tests conducted by Paul Blobel.

At the same time Hößler worked as before in the old crematorium at the main camp Auschwitz I, including gassings in the bunkers. Johann Kremer, SS camp doctor from 30 August to 17 November 1942, recorded a transport of 1,703 Dutch Jews to the main camp managed by Hößler. The incident was described in his diary:

In connection with the gassings I described in my diary dated 12.10.1942, I declare that on that day about 1,600 Dutch were gassed. This is an approximate figure, which I stated as a result of what I had heard from others. The action was led [by] SS officer Hößler. I remember that he tried to drive the whole group into a single bunker. This he achieved up to a last man who could not be crammed further into the bunker. Hoßler shot this man with a revolver. This is the reason why I wrote in the diary: "Gruesome scene before the last bunker! (Hößler!)".

— Johann Kremer, SS KZ-Arzt, in testimony at the Auschwitz trial, 18 July 1947

By the middle of 1943, Hößler became involved in recruiting so-called "Aryan" prison women, with the prospect of better food and care, for a newly opened camp brothel at the Auschwitz I main camp. He was then promoted to the senior role of Schutzhaftlagerführer at the Auschwitz-Birkenau women's camp in August 1943, which he directed together with Oberaufseherin Maria Mandl. In this role he participated in selections and gassings. He succeeded Paul Heinrich Theodor Müller in this capacity. Filip Müller, one of the very few Sonderkommando members who survived Auschwitz, paraphrased Hößler's speech given to trick a group of Greek Jews in the undressing room at the portals of the gas chambers:

On behalf of the camp administration I bid you welcome. This is not a holiday resort but a labor camp. Just as our soldiers risk their lives at the front to gain victory for the Third Reich, you will have to work here for the welfare of a new Europe. How you tackle this task is entirely up to you. The chance is there for every one of you. We shall look after your health, and we shall also offer you well-paid work. After the war we shall assess everyone according to his merits and treat him accordingly.

Now, would you please all get undressed. Hang your clothes on the hooks we have provided and please remember your number [of the hook]. When you've had your bath there will be a bowl of soup and coffee or tea for all. Oh yes, before I forget, after your bath, please have ready your certificates, diplomas, school reports and any other documents so that we can employ everybody according to his or her training and ability.

Would diabetics who are not allowed sugar report to staff on duty after their baths.

— SS-Obersturmführer Franz Hössler

For a short time between 15 March to 15 May 1944, Hößler was also camp commander (German: KZ-Kommandant) of the Neckarelz concentration camp in Mosbach, Germany, a subcamp of the larger Natzweiler-Struthof camp complex in occupied France. Following the Allied invasion of France in June 1944, he returned to the Auschwitz main camp where he was Protective Custody Camp Leader until its final evacuation in January 1945.

== Dora-Mittelbau ==
In January 1945, as the Red Army overran German positions on the Eastern Front, the SS personnel at Auschwitz evacuated to the Mittelbau-Dora concentration camp. Auschwitz commander Richard Baer took over the Dora portion of the complex and Hößler was again made a Protective Custody Camp Leader. On 5 April 1945, as American 3rd Armored Division closed in on Mittelbau-Dora, Hößler led a forced evacuation of prisoners to the railhead for transfer to the still-functioning Bergen-Belsen concentration camp. The prisoners were then led on a death march for the last stage of their journey.

== Bergen-Belsen ==
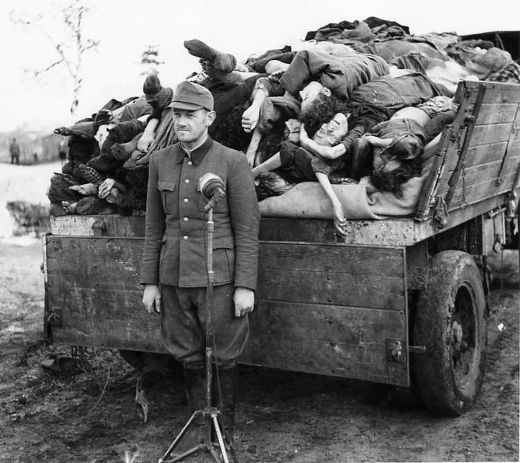
Franz Hössler at Bergen-Belsen

On 8 April 1945, Hößler arrived with his transport at Bergen-Belsen and became deputy camp commander under Josef Kramer. There he directly shot prisoners until the liberation of the camp, crimes for which he would be eventually arrested and tried. On 15 April 1945, Hößler was found hiding among the prisoners in camouflaged clothing and was detained with the remaining SS staff by a unit of the British Army. The SS detainees were then forced to bury thousands of corpses lying around on the camp grounds in mass graves.

== Conviction and execution ==
Hössler and 44 other camp staff were tried in the Belsen Trial by a British military court at Lüneburg. The trial lasted several weeks from September to November 1945. During the trial, Anita Lasker testified that Hössler took part in selections for the gas chamber.

Hössler was sentenced to death by hanging on 17 November 1945, and the sentence was carried out by British hangman Albert Pierrepoint on 13 December 1945 at Hameln prison.

== Literature ==
- Wacław Długoborski, Franciszek Piper (eds.): Auschwitz 1940–1945. Studien zur Geschichte des Konzentrations- und Vernichtungslagers Auschwitz., Verlag Staatliches Museum Auschwitz-Birkenau, Oswiecim 1999, 5 Bände: I. Aufbau und Struktur des Lagers. II. Die Häftlinge – Existentzbedingungen, Arbeit und Tod. III. Vernichtung. IV. Widerstand. V. Epilog., ISBN 83-85047-76-X.
- Staatliches Museum Auschwitz-Birkenau (ed.): Auschwitz in den Augen der SS. Oswiecim 1998, ISBN 83-85047-35-2.
- Ernst Klee: Das Personenlexikon zum Dritten Reich: Wer war was vor und nach 1945. Fischer-Taschenbuch-Verlag, Frankfurt am Main 2007. ISBN 978-3-596-16048-8.
- Hermann Langbein: Menschen in Auschwitz. Frankfurt am Main, Berlin Wien, Ullstein-Verlag, 1980, ISBN 3-54833014-2
- Karin Orth: Die Konzentrationslager-SS. dtv, München 2004, ISBN 3-423-34085-1.
- Karin Orth: Das System der nationalsozialistischen Konzentrationslager. Pendo Verlag, Hamburg 2002, ISBN 3-85-842-450-1
- Jens-Christian Wagner (ed): Konzentrationslager Mittelbau-Dora 1943–1945 Companion volume to the permanent exhibition at the Dora concentration camp memorial, Wallstein, Göttingen, 2007 ISBN 978-3-8353-0118-4.
- Bernhard M. Hoppe: Mittelbau Dora at hsozkult.geschichte.hu-berlin.de
