= Belsen trials =

Allied trial of Nazis after World War II

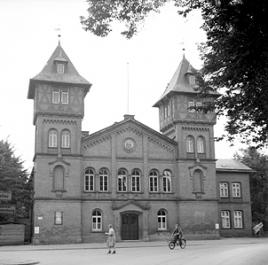
Place of the Belsen trial: old MTV gymnasium, Lindenstraße 30, Lüneburg

The Belsen trials were a series of several trials, starting on 17 September 1945, that the Allied occupation forces conducted against former officials and functionaries of Nazi Germany after the end of World War II in Europe. British Army and civilian personnel ran the trials and staffed the prosecution and judges.

The Belsen trials took place in Lüneburg, Lower Saxony, Germany, the defendants being men and women of the Schutzstaffel as well as prisoner functionaries who had worked at various concentration camps, notably Auschwitz and Bergen-Belsen.

The first trial generated considerable interest around the world, as the public heard for the first time from some of those responsible for the mass murder in the eastern extermination camps. Some later trials are also referred to as Belsen trials.

== First trial ==
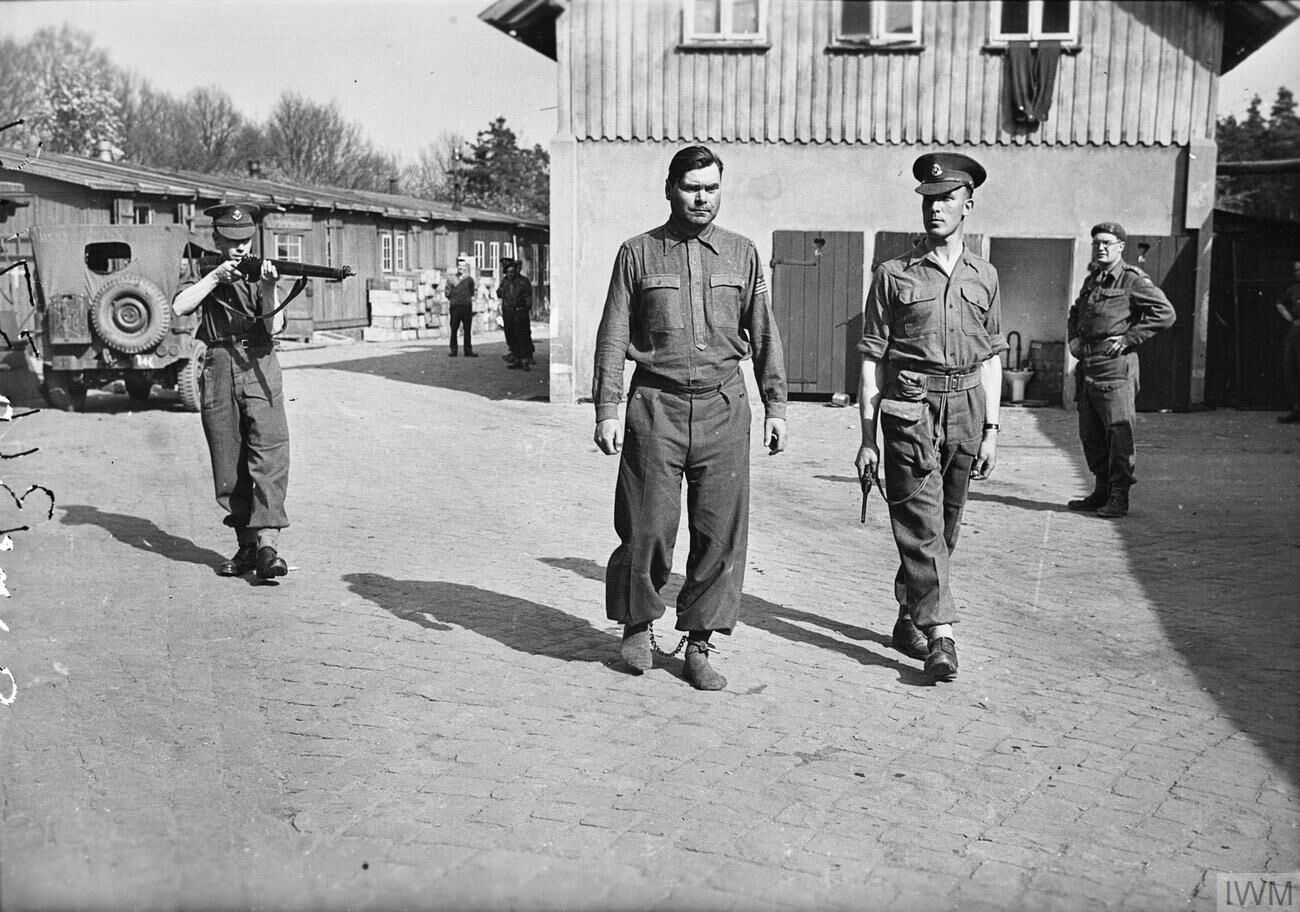
Josef Kramer, photographed in leg irons at Belsen before being removed to the POW cage at Celle, 17 April 1945.

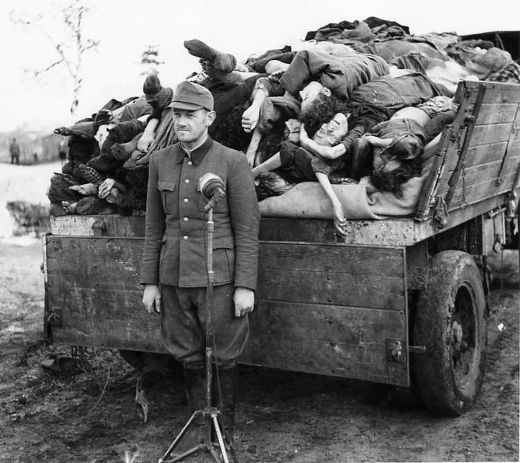
Franz Hössler at Bergen-Belsen

Officially called the "Trial of Josef Kramer and 44 others", the trial began in a Lüneburg gymnasium on 17 September 1945, within the British occupation zone.

The defendants were 45 former SS men, women and kapos (prisoner functionaries) from the Bergen-Belsen and Auschwitz concentration camps. Josef Kramer had been camp commandant at Bergen-Belsen and before that at Auschwitz. Of the other defendants, 12 were kapos, 16 female SS members and 16 male SS members. Although the SS was an all-male organisation, women were able to enlist as members of the SS-Gefolge, a form of civilian employee. One prisoner functionary, Ladisław Gura, who was also an SS member under arrest, was found to be too ill to stand trial after the trial had started. Three others had been excluded from the list of indicted for the same reason before the trial began. Three SS members had been shot trying to escape after the British took over the camp and one had committed suicide. Out of a total of 77 SS men and women arrested by the British in April, another 17 had died of typhus by 1 June 1945.

Next to Kramer, the most high-profile defendants were Fritz Klein, who had been camp doctor at Belsen, and Franz Hössler, deputy camp commandant. Elisabeth Volkenrath had been Oberaufseherin (head warden or supervising wardress) at Auschwitz before she came to Belsen. Many of the defendants had arrived in Bergen-Belsen only after February 1945, some as late as two days before liberation. However, most had been active in similar functions in other concentration camps before that. The trial took place before a British military tribunal. The judges were Major-General H.M.P. Berney-Ficklin (presiding), Brigadier A. de L. Casonove, Colonel G.J. Richards, Lt.-Colonel R.B. Moriush and Lt.-Colonel R. McLay. C.L. Stirling was Judge Advocate. Colonel T.M. Backhouse, Major H.G. Murton-Neale, Capt. S.M. Stewart and Lt.-Col. L.J. Genn were Counsel for the Prosecution. Counsel for the Defence were also members of the British Army — in the case of the five Polish defendants a Polish officer, Lt. A. Jędrzejowicz.

As this was a military court, it was legally based on the Regulations for the Trial of War Criminals made under Royal Warrant of 14 June 1945. All the charges related to international law, which applied at the time the crimes were committed, so this was not a case of retroactive justice. Due to the nature of the court, the only charges that could be brought were war crimes and crimes against citizens of the Allied countries. "Crimes against humanity" and "crimes against peace", which featured in the later trials at Nuremberg, were not among the charges at Lüneburg.

=== Charges ===
The official charges were grouped into crimes committed at Auschwitz and Belsen and were as follows:

At Bergen-Belsen, Germany, between 1st October, 1942, and 30th April, 1945, when members of the staff of Bergen-Belsen Concentration Camp responsible for the well-being of the persons interned there, in violation of the law and usages of war, were together concerned as parties to the ill-treatment of certain of such persons, causing the deaths of Keith Meyer (a British national), Anna Kis, Sara Kohn (both Hungarian nationals), Heimech Glinovjechy and Maria Konatkevicz (both Polish nationals) and Marcel Freson de Montigny (a French national), Maurice Van Eijnsbergen (a Dutch national), Maurice Van Mevlenaar (a Belgian national), Jan Markowski and Georgej Ferenz (both Polish nationals), Salvatore Verdura (an Italian national), and Therese Klee (a British national of Honduras), Allied nationals, and other Allied nationals whose names are unknown, and physical suffering to other persons interned there, Allied nationals and particularly to Harold Osmund le Druillenec (a British national), Benec Zuchermann, a female internee surnamed Korperova, a female internee named Hoffmann, Luba Rormann, Isa Frydmann (all Polish nationals) and Alexandra Siwidowa, a Russian national and other Allied nationals whose names are unknown.

and

...at Auschwitz, Poland, between 1st October, 1942, and 30th April, 1945, when members of the staff of Auschwitz Concentration Camp responsible for the well-being of the persons interned there, in violation of the law and usages of war, were together concerned as parties to ill-treatment of certain of such persons, causing the deaths of Rachella Silberstein (a Polish national), Allied nationals, and other Allied nationals whose names are unknown, and physical suffering to other persons interned there, Allied nationals, and particularly to Ewa Gryka and Hanka Rosenwayg (both Polish nationals) and other Allied nationals whose names are unknown.

All of the defendants pleaded not guilty.

=== Overview of the trial ===
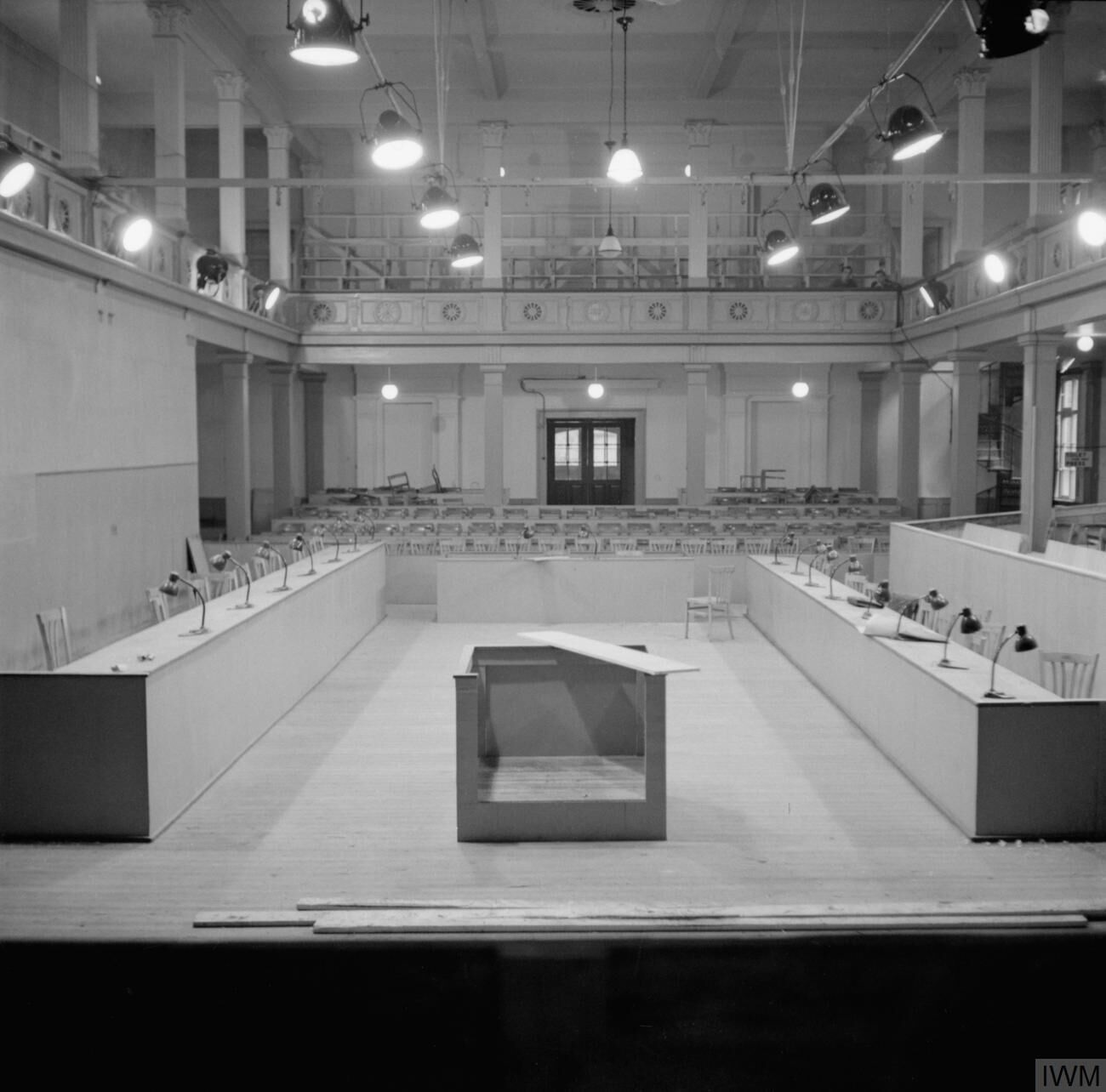
Interior shot of the court room ten days before the start of the trial

The trial lasted 54 days in court. It began on 17 September with the indictment and the opening speech for the prosecution. Brigadier Glyn Hughes was the first witness for the prosecution on 18–19 September.

On 20 September, the British Army screened a film they had made of the conditions at Belsen immediately after liberation. On 21 September, the court visited Bergen-Belsen. Evidence for the defence began on 8 October with the opening speech for the defendant, Kramer, who also testified. Closing speeches were made from 7–12 November, followed by the closing arguments by the prosecution on 13 November. Sentencing took place four days later, on 17 November 1945.

Since the trial was conducted in English, translations into German and Polish were necessary. This was one of the factors which prolonged the trial, which had initially been expected to last for two to four weeks. In retrospect, the prosecution has been criticised as hasty and ill-prepared. None of the SS guards who had fled the camp after the ceasefire on 13 April had been searched for. Instead of eyewitness testimony, in some cases only affidavits were available at the trial. Some witnesses contradicted themselves on cross-examination, while others failed to identify the defendants as the perpetrators of the crimes in question. One former inmate, Oskar Schmitz, was erroneously charged as an SS man, and had no chance to clarify this before the trial began.

The defence claimed that the arrest of the defendants had been illegal, as it contravened the promise of free withdrawal contained in the ceasefire agreement. However, the wording on this point was only clear for members of the Wehrmacht at Belsen. Moreover, according to the prosecution, the burning of the camp files by the SS and the firing of shots on 15 April had voided the agreement. In fact, the relevant section of the ceasefire agreement read:

SS guard personnel [...] will be treated as PW. SS Adj personnel will [...] remain at their posts and carry on with their duties (cooking, supplies, etc) and will hand over records. When their services can be dispensed with, their disposal is left by the Wehrmacht to the British authorities.

On 17 November, the court sentenced 11 of the defendants to death by hanging. Another 18 were found guilty and sentenced to prison sentences of one to 15 years. One defendant, Erich Zoddel, was sentenced to life in prison, but was then executed 13 days later. Zoddel had been sentenced to death in a separate military trial in August 1945 for murdering a female prisoner after the liberation. None of the sentenced were only found guilty of the "conspiracy" of working within the concentration camp system, but rather all of them were sentenced for individually committed crimes. 14 defendants were acquitted (the final defendant was too sick to stand trial). Due to clemency pleas and appeals, many prison sentences were eventually shortened considerably. By mid-1955, all those sentenced to prison had been released.

=== Individual defendants and sentences ===
List of SS-defendants

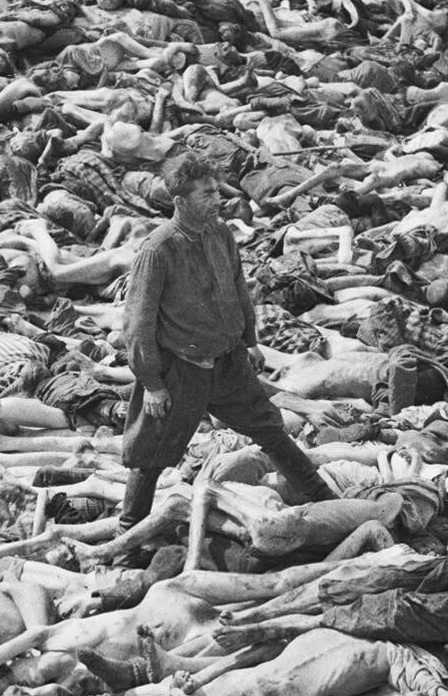
Fritz Klein surrounded by bodies. The British Army liberating Bergen-Belsen forced German camp personnel to bury the corpses of prisoners.

(A=guilty of crimes at Auschwitz, B = guilty of crimes at Bergen-Belsen)

Name	Sentence
Josef Kramer (A, B)	Death, executed on 13 December 1945
Fritz Klein (A, B)	Death, executed on 13 December 1945
Peter Weingärtner (A, B)	Death, executed on 13 December 1945
Franz Hössler (A)	Death, executed on 13 December 1945
Karl Franzioh (B)	Death, executed on 13 December 1945
Ansgar Pichen (B)	Death, executed on 13 December 1945
Franz Stofel (or Stärfl) (B)	Death, executed on 13 December 1945
Wilhelm Dörr (B)	Death, executed on 13 December 1945
Irma Grese (A, B)	Death, executed on 13 December 1945
Elisabeth Volkenrath (A, B)	Death, executed on 13 December 1945
Johanna Bormann (B)	Death, executed on 13 December 1945
Otto Kulessa (B)	15 years, released on 7 May 1955
Heinrich Schreirer (A)	15 years, released on 3 September 1950
Herta Ehlert (B)	15 years, reduced to 12 years, released on 7 May 1953
Ilse Förster (B)	10 years, released on 21 December 1951
Herta Bothe (B)	10 years, released on 21 December 1951
Irene Haschke (B)	10 years, released on 21 December 1951
Gertrud Sauer (B)	10 years, released on 21 December 1951
Anna Hempel (B)	10 years, released on 21 April 1951
Gertrud Feist (B)	5 years, released on 11 August 1949
Frieda Walter (B)	3 years, released on 16 November 1948
Hilde Lisiewicz (B)	1 year, released on 16 November 1946
Georg Krafft	Acquitted
Josef Klippel	Acquitted
Fritz Mathes	Acquitted
Karl Egersdörfer	Acquitted
Walter Otto	Acquitted
Erich Barsch	Acquitted
Ida Förster	Acquitted
Klara Opitz	Acquitted
Charlotte Klein	Acquitted
Hildegard Hähnel	Acquitted

Not able to stand trial due to illness: Nikolaus Jänner, Paul Steinmetz, Walter Melcher, Ladisław Gura (who was both an SS member and a prison functionary).

List of Kapos

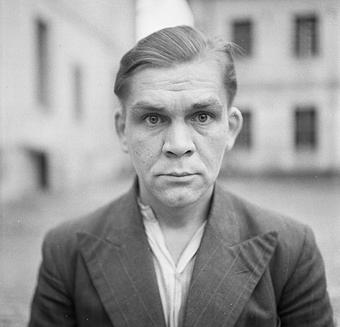
Erich Zoddel in Allied custody after the liberation of Bergen-Belsen

(A=guilty of crimes at Auschwitz, B = guilty of crimes at Bergen-Belsen)

Name	Sentence
Erich Zoddel (B)	Life imprisonment, but executed for an unrelated charge on 30 November 1945
Wladisław Ostrowski (B)	15 years, released on 24 June 1955
Helena Kopper (B)	15 years, reduced to 10 years, released on 26 February 1952
Hilde Lohbauer (A, B)	10 years, released on 15 July 1950
Antoni Aurdzig (B)	10 years, released on 20 March 1952
Johanne Roth (B)	10 years, released on 15 July 1950
Stanisława Starostka (A)	10 years, committed suicide in prison on 10 May 1946
Medislaw Burgraf (B)	5 years, released on 11 August 1949
Ilse Lothe	Acquitted (charged with B)
Oskar Schmitz	Acquitted (charged with B)
Ignatz Schlomowicz	Acquitted (charged with B)
Anton Polanski	Acquitted (charged with B)
Ladisław Gura	Unable to stand trial (accused of B)

=== Public reaction ===
The Belsen Trial attracted substantial national and international media interest. Significantly, more than 100 representatives of the news media reported at length on the trial's progress.

Through them, the world learned not just about the thousands of deaths by hunger and disease at Belsen, communicated especially forcefully by the film and photo evidence produced by the British Army. Possibly even more importantly, the Belsen trial also was the first time that the organised mass murder at Auschwitz Birkenau received a public airing, with some of those responsible describing the selection process, the use of the gas chambers and the crematoria. In Great Britain, the trial was mostly viewed positively, as a triumph of the rule of law, given the fairness and meticulousness with which it had been conducted. However, in some other countries, notably the Soviet Union and France, the verdicts were criticised as too mild. Many survivors also felt this way.

=== Executions ===
All the executions were carried out on 13 December 1945 by hanging at Hamelin Prison. The executioner was Albert Pierrepoint, aided by an assistant.

== Second trial ==
A second Belsen trial was conducted at Lüneburg from 13 to 18 June 1946 by a British military tribunal.

Name	Sentence
Walter Quakernack	Death, executed on 11 October 1946
Heinz-Züder Heidemann	Death, executed on 11 October 1946
Karl Redehase	Death, executed on 11 October 1946
Kasimir Cegielski	Death, executed on 11 October 1946
Theodor Wagner	20 years, released on 24 December 1954
Karl Schmidt	15 years, reduced to 10 years, released on 21 December 1951
Gertrud Heise	15 years, reduced to 7 years
Martha Linke	12 years, reduced to 7 years
Anneliese Kohlmann	2 years, released on 16 June 1946

== Third trial ==
The British held a third Belsen trial in April 1948. There was only one defendant, Ernst Julius Curt Meyer. Meyer had been arrested in May 1945, but was erroneously released in September 1947. He was re-arrested in February 1948. Meyer was found guilty of war crimes for non-fatal abuse and sentenced to life in prison. His sentence was reduced to 21 years in 1950, and he was released from prison on 24 December 1954.

== See also ==
- Allied Control Council
- Subsequent Nuremberg Trials
