= Waldemar Schön =

Standartenführer Waldemar Schön, or Karl Alexander Waldemar Schön, also Schoen, (b. August 3, 1904 in Merseburg, d. 9 October 1969 in Freising) joined the NSDAP and the SA in 1930. After the invasion of Poland by Nazi Germany in 1939 he was appointed head of the newly created Ressettlement Division of the Warsaw District within General Government territory of the German occupied Poland. He was named Abteilungsleiter in 1940 by the World War II Governor of the District Ludwig Fischer.

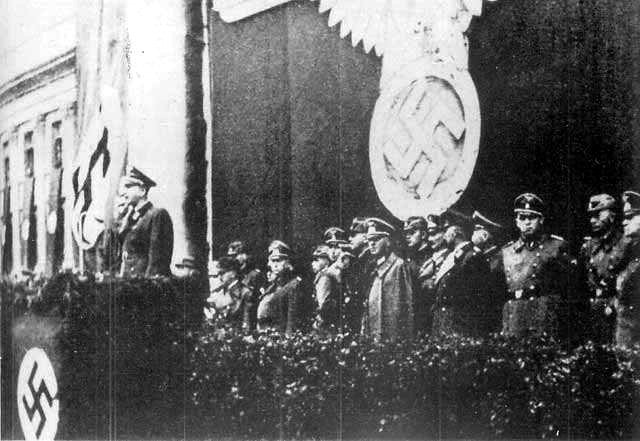
SS officials in Warsaw, 1940. Speaking, SA-Führer Ludwig Fischer

In early 1940 Schön was a 36-year-old Nazi party official, who came up with the idea of erecting not one, but two suburban Jewish ghettos in occupied Warsaw; not to disrupt the city traffic and overall economy; one in Koło, and the second one in Wola. He took part in the General Government (GG) conference of June 6–7, 1940 where the ghetto idea – as a staging point for Polish Jews on the other side of the Vistula River – was first discussed in order to curtail their presence in the city.

We want to show the world that in the framework of our colonial work, we are able to cope with the Jewish problem even when it emerges as a problem of masses... The development of the Jewish district in Warsaw represents in practice a preliminary step to the exploitation of Jewish labor in Madagascar planned by the Führer. — Waldemar Schön

After the Madagascar Plan was abolished, the ghettoization plan went ahead, and on September 12, 1940, the Warsaw Ghetto was formally approved by Gauleiter Hans Frank in occupied Kraków.

Waldemar Schön was an attritionist who along with Karl Naumann advocated for the elimination of virtually all food supplies to the Warsaw Ghetto. He established an office called Transferstelle in order to extract money and valuables from the Jews by means of "artificial famine" (künstliche Hungersnot) and stopped food deliveries to the ghetto in mid-January 1941. The ensuing crisis he created was so extreme that on April 19, 1941, Schön was moved by Frank to another position in the district, and replaced by Heinz Auerswald who restored order. Despite having played a key role in the systematic starvation and extermination of Warsaw's Jewish population, Schön survived the war and was never punished for his crimes against humanity.
