= Franz Podezin =

German SS-Hauptscharführer and Gestapo chief (1911–1995)

SS-Hauptscharführer Franz Podezin chief perpetrator of the Rechnitz Massacre

Franz Podezin (1911–1995) was a German SS-Hauptscharführer and Gestapo chief in Rechnitz, Austria. On the night of 24–25 March 1945, allegedly on the direction of the "Killer Countess" Margit von Batthyány, daughter of Baron Heinrich Thyssen, Podezin engaged in the massacre of at least 180 Hungarian Jewish slave laborers in Rechnitz who were assigned to dig anti-tank ditches in anticipation of the approaching Red Army.

The slave laborers were machine gunned to death allegedly as part of a perverse celebration of Nazi functionaries at Batthyány's Schloss Rechnitz. There has been controversy over the version of events as reported by British journalist David Litchfield. The fact that the killings occurred and Podezin took part is not disputed. The dispute stems from whether the killings were done to amuse the guests at the party and if party guests took part in the murders.
