= Paul Heinrich Theodor Müller =

German SS member and concentration camp leader

Paul Heinrich Theodor Müller (31 January 1896 in Kiel – after January 1945, declared dead by the District Court of Hohenlimburg in 1953) was a German member of the SS and Concentration Camp Operational Leader (Schutzhaftlagerführer) at Auschwitz concentration camp.

== Life ==
Müller, a merchant by profession, joined the SS in October 1933 (member no. 179,667), after the Machtergreifung. He then joined the Nazi Party on 1 May 1937 (member no. 4,486,232). By the beginning of World War II in 1939, he was employed at Sachsenhausen concentration camp. From 1940 he was employed at the Schutzstaffel Economic-Administrative Main Office, which was at Flossenbürg concentration camp.

In April 1942, Müller was ordered to Auschwitz concentration camp, where until June 1942 he served as Kompanieführer of the 1st Wachkompanie (First Guard Company). From July 1942 to October 1943, he served as Kompanieführer of the 2nd Wachkompanie in the main camp and was at the same time Schutzhaftlagerführer of the women's camp in the main camp, which, in August 1942, was converted into the extermination camp of Auschwitz-Birkenau (Auschwitz II). In the women's camp, he worked with Oberaufseherinnen Johanna Langefeld and, from October 1942, Maria Mandl.

In August 1943, he was replaced as Schutzhaftlagerführer in the women's camp by Franz Hössler. In November 1943, he was Kompanieführer of the 1st and 2nd Wachkompanies in Monowitz concentration camp, which were also responsible for guarding the subcamps of Golleschau and Jawischowitz. On 30 January 1944, Müller was awarded the War Merit Cross Second Class with Swords. In September 1944, he became head of the newly established satellite camp at Neustadt in Oberschlesien (now Prudnik, Poland). It was a weaving mill in which 400 female prisoners were forced to work. He served there until the evacuation of Auschwitz in January 1945.
