= Olympiapark Berlin =

Sports and entertainment complex in Berlin, Germany

Coordinates: 52.516°N 13.239°E

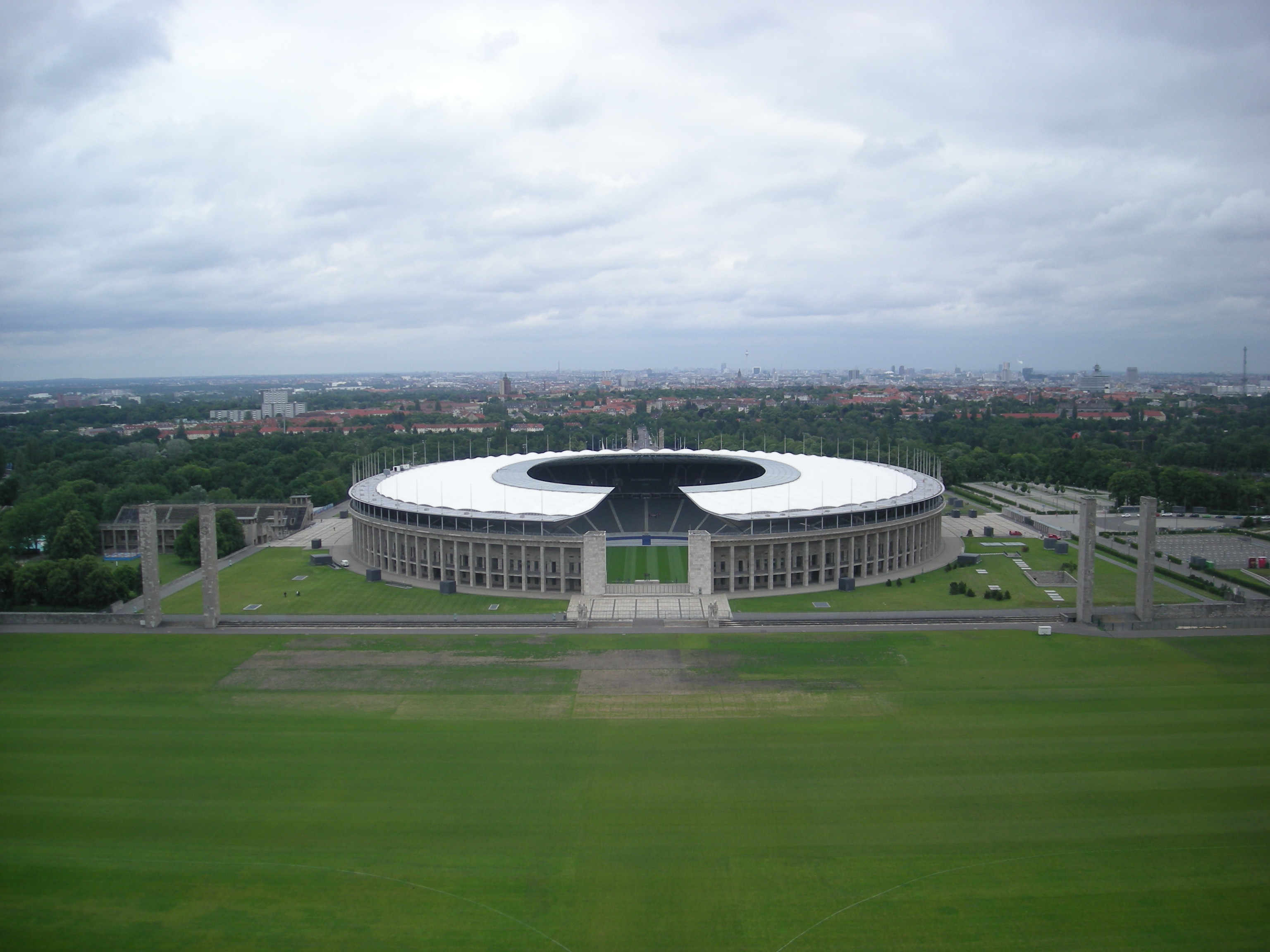
Olympiastadion

Olympiapark Berlin (German for Berlin Olympic Park), previously the Deutsches Sportforum (lit. 'German Sport Forum') and the Reichssportfeld (lit. 'Reich Sports Field'), is a sports and entertainment complex located in Berlin, Germany. The complex served as the Olympic Park of the 1936 Summer Olympics.

== History ==
=== Early history ===
==== "A people's park" ====
The area in the Grunewald had been promised to the people of Berlin as "a people's park" by Emperor Wilhelm II in 1904. Due to this, when the Union-Klub later signed a lease for a horseracing track, they had to agree that their land would also host "general sports functions"

==== Grunewald Race Course ====
A horse race track at Hoppegarten just east outside the city held its first races as early as 1868. The "Union-Klub" was one of the main organizations behind the early development of that site. Due to a loss of spectators, the Union-Klub started looking for a new site to the west of Berlin by the time they settled upon a site in Ruhleben, where the club would lease land and manage a horse racing track from 1884 until 1893. In 1906 Victor von Podbielski was able to arrange for the "Union-Klub" to find another location in the Grunewald. In February 1907, the organization signed a 30-year lease for land north of Döberitzer Heerstraße. This would become the Gunewald Race Course.

The Grunewald Race Course was the original sporting venue on the site now occupied by Olympiapark Berlin. This horse racing venue was designed by Otto March, and opened 3 May 1909. The venue had a capacity of 40,000. Its center contained an 85,000 square meter depression slated to eventually house a stadium. That stadium planned for the center of the racecourse would come only five years later.

=== Deutsches Sportforum (1912–1925) ===
Plans to build an Olympic sports complex in the area of the Racetrack can be traced as far back as 1906 prior to Germany's athletic participation in the 1906 Intercalated Games.

During the 1912 Summer Olympics, the city of Berlin was designated by the International Olympic Committee (IOC) to host the 1916 Summer Olympics during the 14th IOC Conference which was held in Stockholm on 27 May 1912. Berlin had previously bid unsuccessfully for the 1908 Summer Olympics, and had hosted the 10th IOC Conference (where the host for the 1912 Summer Olympics had been voted on) on 27 May 1909. Berlin defeated bids from Alexandria, Egypt; Amsterdam, Netherlands; Brussels, Belgium; Budapest, Hungary; and Cleveland, United States in the bid for 1916 Summer Olympics.

The stadium for this was to be located in Charlottenburg, in the Grunewald Forest, to the west of Berlin.

The government of Germany decided not to build in the nearby Grunewald forest, or to renovate buildings that already existed. Because of this desire, they hired the same architect who originally had built the "Rennverein" (the Grunewald Race Course) Otto March. The organizing committee's evaluation of the site a site led them to decide that the area inside the Grunewald Race Course offered enough room for a suitable venue to be built. Access to this stadium was provided by a tunnel passage under the racetrack. The tunnel was 65 feet wide, and provided access to the south end of the stadium. This tunnel is one of the few surviving portions of the former race track. The stadium was sunk into the ground on inside of the racetrack, so as not to disturb the view of the racing action.

The Berlin Racing Association contributed a piece of land on the northern end of the Grunewald for the stadium. The land had been originally rented by the Racing Association from the Forest Department.

Work on the stadium, the Deutsches Stadion (German: German Stadium), began in August 1912. When it opened, it held over 18,500 spectators, and had a seating capacity of 11,500. March decided to bury the stadium in the ground ("Erdstadion", in German). On 8 June 1913 the stadium was dedicated with the release of 10,000 pigeons. 60,000 people were in attendance. The stadium contained a 650-foot running track surrounded by a 720-yard cycling track. A 108-yard swimming pool was located on the outer edge of the cycling tack. The stadium also was alternatively known by the names Grunewaldstadion and Berlin Stadium. The stadium was inaugurated 15 May 1913, following a mere 200-day construction schedule. The opening ceremony of the stadium occurred 8 June 1913. Otto March had died April of that year, thus he was unable to see the opening of the stadium.

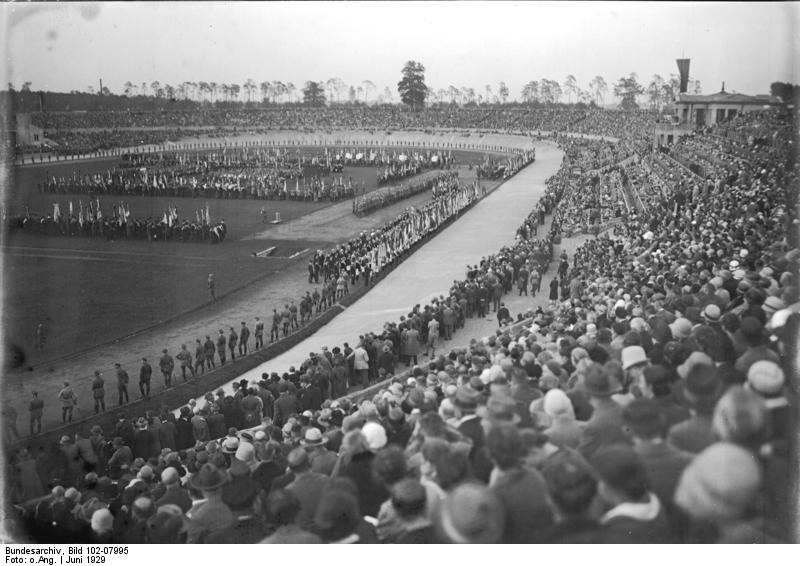
Deutsches Stadion

One unique facet of the venue was a large oak located just outside the eastern edge of the stadium. Otto March made the decision to leave the oak. It was a decision inspired by the holy olive tree that had blessed the Ancient Olympic Games in Olympia. The oak was named the "Podbielski-Eiche" after the State Minister.

Organization continued despite the onset of World War I in 1914, since it was not expected that the war would continue for long enough to interrupt the games. Eventually, though, the Games were cancelled due to the war.

The stadium was closed on 26 July 1914, and by 1915 the stadium was being used as a military hospital. It would be a year until sports would again take place in the stadium.

15 May 1920 the "Deutsche Hochschule für Leibesübungen" (German: German University for Athletics) (DHfL) was founded by Berlin's Friedrich-Wilhelms-University. This sports institution was also referred to alternately as the "German Institute for Physical Education". The German University for Athletics used the Deutsches Stadion.

Beginning in the summer of 1921, a two-story university building was constructed north of the stadium's swimming pool. 26 May 1922, this new building, which included a gymnasium, fencing hall, and a dining and reading room, was opened.

In 1925 Theodor Lewald suggested that the complex be named the "Sportforum". 16 September 1925, the board of the German Committee for Physical Training (the DRA) officially began using the name "Deutsches Sportforum" (German: German Sportforum) for the complex.

=== Deutsches Sportforum (1925–1933) ===
The stadium was outgrown the by German Institute for Physical Education. The DRA, which before WWI had been the "National Committee for the Olympic Games" (Germany's NOC), supplemented the stadium's facilities by building the "Deutsches Sportforum" complex, alternately referred to as the "Deutsches Sportsforum" (German: German Sports Forum). The facilities were largely dedicated to educating physical education teachers, as well as to studying sport science. The buildings of the Sportforum were constructed northeast of the stadium. Werner March, son of Otto March, won a contest relating to the construction of the complex, and served as its architect. Werner largely collaborated with brother Walter March on this and other projects he would later work on for the sports complex.

The cornerstone of the complex was laid by on 18 October 1925, the anniversary of the Battle of Leipzig.

A women's dormitory for students was constructed at the northwest end of the grounds. A tunnel beneath the cycling track connected the stadium with the northern portion of the complex, which allowed the stadium's track and the new running track to both be used for competition and practice respectively. A planned gymnasium had begun construction in 1926, but was only half complete when the entire project was halted in 1928 due to insufficient funds to continue construction.

Prior to the onslaught of the Great Depression, Werner March had made a design for the renovation of the Deutsches Stadion into a venue with a 65,000-person capacity as a part of revived plans to hopefully host the Olympic Games in Berlin.

==== Planned expansion and original Olympic preparations ====
The training fields and training halls of the complex received great usage. Studies were undertaken for the complex's expansion in 1928, after work had halted on the existing portions of the complex. Eventually, in the course of these studies, it was realized that Deutsches Stadium's infield was too large, leading to poor sightlines, and its maximum capacity of 40,000 spectators was deemed to be too small to serve as an Olympic Stadium if Berlin, as was being considered, were to host the Olympics in 1936. The reason the stadium could not be expanded beyond 40,000 due to the Grunewald Race Course. If the Race Course were to be retained, the stadium's height could not be increased.

The need for an expanded Sportforum was furthered on 25 April 1931, when the International Olympic Committee announced Berlin as the host of the 1936 Summer Olympic Games. Berlin was awarded the 1936 Summer Olympics on 26 May 1930. at the 30th IOC Conference, held in Lausanne, Switzerland.

After Berlin was awarded the Olympics, plans were drawn up to renovate the Deutsches Stadion extensively. The venue only held 30,000 spectators, which by then had become insufficient host the Olympics. The cycling track would be completely eliminated, and the current 650-yard running track would be removed as well and replaced with a new 433-yard track (adhering to the international dimensions). The field would be sunken deeper, and new rows of seats were to be constructed at the bottom of the current stands. Its seating capacity would as a result of this planned renovation been increased from 30,000 to 80,000 spectators. The tunnel entrance at the south end, crossing below the Grunewald Race Course, was a source of congestion during events. Plans were made to relieve this congestion by building a new eastern tunnel, and by a new entrance to the entire complex would be constructed on the side facing the main city-center, which was only 5 miles to the east of the complex. The stadium's expansion was to be of a modern steel and reinforced concrete structure.

One unique and appealing aspect of the original stadium had been the inclusion of a swimming pool. In the plans to renovate the stadium, attempts were made to retain the union between the swimming pool and the athletic stadium. Initially, plans were considered to move the pool to a location inside the stadium between the outer edge of the new running track and the stands, either on the west or east side of the stadium. Werner March than decided against this direct union, and instead located a swimming stadium outside the stadium, at a 90-degree angle to its longitudinal axis. It was to be at the same level of the outside gallery of the Olympic Stadium, and half as high as the stands of the stadium, placing the swimming venue in-line with the stadium's entrance. An enclosed arcade was thereafter added to the plans as well.

A model of these plans was publicly displayed at the German Building Exhibition in July 1931. The plan received approval from sport governing bodies. The DRA began discussions to execute the plans. The Berlin Racing Association had changed their stance from a previously voiced opposition to renovating the stadium, to a more favorable attitude towards the project on the condition that they were to be compensated for the horse races that would have to be suspended during the construction process. The Ministry of Agriculture then agreed to lease the entire grounds to the Racing Association with the condition that the sub-lease of the stadium by the DRA should be continued. The land east of the racecourse was made available for building the planned tunnel.

In January 1932, the City of Berlin put forth a surprise counter plan. The City's Municipal Construction Councilor Wagnar made the suggestion that a temporary wooden stadium instead should be built on the fair grounds for the Olympics. This plan was favored by the city because it did not want to pay for roadway expenses necessitated by the DRA's plan. Theodor Lewald rejected the city's plan for a temporary venue.

Planning continued. Additional aspects of the project would include the expansion of the Sportforum, finishing the half-completed gymnasium, the construction of a large sporting hall and of a new student dormitory.

March's plans for the Olympic Stadium were accepted by the IOC in June 1933.

At a meeting of the Construction Committee of the Organizing Committee (for the Olympics) on 15 July 1933, presided over by Carl Diem several aspects were added to the plan. It was decided to complete the gymnasium and include a small swimming pool in its basement. It was also decided that there would be a gymnastic and assembly hall with connected living quarters and a restaurant added to the complex, as well as two small buildings to serve as dressing rooms on the track field. Construction was set to begin at the beginning of October 1933.

=== Reichssportfeld (1933–1949) ===
==== Olympic preparations by the Nazi Reich ====
When the Nazis came to power in Germany in 1933, they decided to use the Olympic Games in 1936 for propaganda purposes. With this in mind, Hitler made plans for the construction of a great sports complex in Grunewald named the "Reichssportfeld", with a brand-new Olympiastadion as its centerpiece. Architect Werner March remained in charge of the project, assisted by his brother Walter March.

The games had been awarded to Berlin in 1931 when Germany's government was the democratic Weimar Republic and the original plans for the Sportforum had been drawn up under this government. Construction on the proposed expansion of the Sportforum was set to commence in October 1933, but in March of that same year the Nazis had come to power in Germany. The German Committee for Physical Training was dissolved, and the deed to the Sportforum was transferred to the Nazi government. Around this time the complex was renamed the "Reichssportfeld" (German: Reich Sports Field).

It was questioned whether the construction and half of the cost for the stadium (with the other half being paid for by the national government in the form of subsidies) should fall onto the City of Berlin. The city already was going to pay for the construction of the approach roads to the Olympic Stadium, this expense was the main reason they had hoped to place a temporary stadium elsewhere in January 1932, and the expense of leasing land from the Prussian Forestry Department for use as parking lots to serve the Stadium. The City of Berlin named the conditions under which they would assume the additional expenditure of the stadium's construction. The first was that the entire area of the Grunewald Racecourse, the including the Grunewald Racecourse's stadium, which had previously been leased to the Berlin Racing Association, would now be leased directly by the city for a minimum of 30 years by the Prussian Forestry Department (who were the owners of the land). As a result, the Racing Association would then become a sub-lessee of the City of Berlin. Their second condition was for the Reich to forfeit any claims it had to ownership of the stadium, resigning this right solely to the City of Berlin. This far into their negotiations Adolf Hitler visited the Deutsches Stadion on 5 October 1933, and announced his decision. Hitler was quick in his decision to alter the existing architectural plans for the Olympic venues, as he desired more grand and extravagant venues than those that had been proposed before the IOC in 1931 by Berlin's bid team.

"The old race course shall be conveyed to the Reich, which will take over all the Olympic constructions in Grunewald. The Stadium itself is to be enlarged to provide seats for 100,000 persons. A swimming stadium and a riding field shall be built on the Stadium grounds. An assembly field large enough for mass demonstrations shall be provided in connection with the enlargement of the Stadium. A large open-air theatre shall be erected in the charming Murellen Valley in the northwest part of the Stadium grounds. The German Sport Forum shall be completed through the enlargement of the gymnasium, the erection of a new indoor swimming pool, a dormitory, and above all, through the erection of a large administration and instruction building, the House of German Sport."
— Adolf Hitler, October 5, 1933

Thus, four days after construction on the earlier proposed expansion to the Sportforum had previously been set to commence, those plans were killed.

Werner March had been commissioned to create sketches for the new "Reichssportfeld" on 5 October 1933, the very same day that Hitler had announced his intentions to build it. Dr. Diem was called-in from a trip abroad to work on the project's proposals with Werner March. The main outline of their plans was created hastily, and received Hitler's approval.

The question arose whether or not the new stadium for the Olympics should be built on the footprint of the original Deutsches Stadium, providing it with a direct connection to its predecessor, or instead located 162 yards east of it. Moving east would align it on a direct axis with the Schwarzburg Bridge along the main east-west street approaching the complex. This would provide the entire complex with a stricter symmetry, and thus was the option favored by Hitler.

The Berlin Racing Association was made to vacate their use of the complex, as the Grunewald Race Course was to be demolished to create the Reich Sports Field. The Berlin Racing Association were to be compensated according to Hitler's orders, by receiving the funding from the "Racing Association" as well as the "Union Club and the Society for Steeplechasing" to expand the race tracks that the Berlin Racing Association also owned in Hoppegarten and Karlshorst.

In November 1933 the Nazi Reich Ministry of Finance established the Stadium Construction Office. Authority over this organization belonged to the Government Construction Counciller Sponzholz. In December 1933 the Minister of the Interior created the "Construction Committee for the Reich Sport Field". State Secretary Hans Pfundtner served as the Committee's chairman. 11 October 1933, the proposed construction schedule was submitted to Hitler. 31 October Hitler visited the complex along with Reich Minister of the Interior Wilhelm Frick, approving the plans in principle. Nonetheless, Hitler voiced a number of concerns surrounding the architectural appearance of the buildings, and his wishes for stone to be used in the construction of the complex as frequently as possible, rather than concrete.

On 14 December 1933, Hitler had the March brothers called into his office, and decided to have them create a third design for an Olympic Stadium. This is the plan that was used, and contained not only the Olympic Stadium that would be built, but also other elements that were built such as the Olympischer Platz, parade grounds with the "Führerloge", the Olympic Bell Tower along the east-west axis the Coubertinplatz, and the swimming stadium placed on the north-south axis. Hitler approved plans for complex the same day.

In late fall of 1933 demolition work began on the old Deutsches Stadion, and work commenced on the completion of the gymnasium that had been left half-finished since 1928. Construction took place from 1934 to 1936. Complying with Hitler's wishes, the stadiums were largely built using natural stone instead of concrete, requiring 39,538 cubic yards of stone.

Demolition of the horse race track began in March 1934.

Werner March preserved much of the woods on the slopes on all sides of the complex. A significant portion of the land was untouched woods and meadows. Despite a long history of use on the site, the majority of the Olympic Park's land was completely free of any existing buildings, with the existing buildings of the Sportforum in the far north end of the complex constituting exception to this. The north end's arrangement was largely governed by its existing structures. In other areas of the park, March desired to preserve much of the natural landscape. March had Professor Wiepking-Jürgensman assist in transplanting 40,000 trees to the northern portion of the park, to unite it with the surrounding natural landscape.

Access to the site was significantly improved through the creation of new roadways. The complex was already a short distance north of Heerstrasse, the primary east-west thoroughfare out of the city. Friedrich-Friesen-Allee, one of two streets that had served the site, was widened. A new street was built, creating an approach from the west. This road branched off from Heerstrasse and terminated in front of the location of the Olympic Bell Tower. An approach from the east was also established by extending the Schwarzburg Allee, which was thereafter renamed as Olympische Strasse. This street crossed railway tracks over a wide bridge, and then led into the Olympic Square. The Underground and Municipal railway stations serving the site were expanded, with new exits built allowing visitors to leave in close proximity to the Olympic Stadium. Semicircular parking lots were constructed in at the south of the Reich Sport Field within the greenbelt surrounding the grounds.

The Olympic Bell contained within the 77-meter Olympic Bell Tower featured the Olympic Rings with an eagle, the year 1936, the Brandenburg Gate, the date 1–16 August, and a motto between two swastikas: “I call the youth of the world” and 11. Olympic Games Berlin inscribed upon it. It was located amongst the tiers of the Maifeld stand, acting as the pinnacle of the Reich Sports Field's western end. An observation deck inside provided views of the city of Berlin. During the games it would be utilized as an observation post for administrators, police officials, doctors, and media officials.

The hanging of the Olympic Bell began Monday, 11 May 1936. The first trial ringing occurred on 20 May.

The Olympic Stadium was filled with spectators for the first time on 5 July for a pre-Olympic test.

The main focal point of the entire complex's composition was to be the Olympic Stadium, which was located at the middle of the Reich Sport Field. 86,400 square yards (two times the area which was occupied by the stadiums stands) surrounding the stadium were left open, serving as public promenades around the stadium. Werner March had been proud of the fact that spectators could empty the Olympic Stadium in thirteen and a half minutes, as compared to the previous Summer Olympic Stadium (Los Angeles Memorial Coliseum), which would take fifteen and a half minutes to empty. March was the stadium's architect for the majority of the project, though Hitler ultimately replaced him with Albert Speer as the stadium's architect.

March's stadium was modern in its aesthetics, which did not match the Nazi's goal to use the Olympics to display themselves as an imperial power in the mold of the Roman Empire. March's design lacked the monumental scale and neo-classical architecture that were the core values of Nazi architecture. Hitler allegedly had even threatened to cancel the Berlin games altogether if March's stadium was not altered to his satisfaction. After being appointed, Speer designed a neo-classical facade for the stadium literally overnight to meet Hitler's satisfaction. Speer's design was used, and clad March's stadium's exposed steel frame with stone. Characteristically of Nazi architecture, Speer's design placed stone pillars and colonnades over steel supports.

March aspired to design a Modern monument, while Hitler hoped to create a distorted vision of ancient Rome, much as he aspired to do politically.

The stadium's exterior height gave it a profile 54 feet tall, but the stadium was sunk 45 into the ground, both allowing greater spectator circulation into and out of the stadium as the upper seating ring was located nearer to the ground-level since the lower ring was below-ground, as well as creating a much larger interior than is expected by visitors due to its exterior profile only showing a portion of the venue. This effect is similar to that of Michigan Stadium. Unlike most previous Olympic Stadiums (such as Panathenaic Stadium and Los Angeles Memorial Coliseum) March's new Olympic Stadium took the shape of an oval rather than using the traditional open-ended horseshoe-shape that many other Olympic Stadiums had.

The stadium's neoclassical design was intended to evoke similarities to the Colosseum in Rome. Its size was intended to be imposing.

The stadium's columns were decorated with Olympic imagery. The stadium's interior featured grand concourses covered with Nazi flags.

Aware of the political significance of architecture as a mode to promote Nazi ideology, Hitler demanded that the Olympic Stadium be constructed entirely using German materials.

The stadium was constructed on an east-west orientation. The stadium could hold 120,000 spectators, and had seating room for 65,000.

The 65-foot wide tunnel that served the previous Deutsches Stadium was repurposed to serve as both an underground path providing access to VIP loges, as well as a path for athletes to enter the stadium from, as it was connected with the Marathon tunnel which was built for the Olympic marathon to provide a point for Marathon competitors to run into the stadium and to provide a sort of prop door allowing for large equipment to be brought into the stadium. The Marathon tunnel was accessed from outside the stadium through the ‘Marathon Gate’ into the Olympic Plaza. These stairs were aethstetically connected with the Maifeld. It was in this area of the stadium that the Olympic cauldron was located during the ceremonies. The 65-foot entrance tunnel leftover from Deutsches Stadium was also connected to the new stadium's cellar level, and to two competitor's tunnels which provided access to the field. The tunnel also received a 13-foot wide and 600-yard long expansion at its north end passing underneath the "Reich Academy for Physical Education" training grounds and connecting the Olympic Stadium with the swimming stadium. As it passes below the fields, this tunnel expansion also functioned as the corridor of subterranean dressing rooms for the training grounds located directly above.

The stadium's construction lasted from late 1933 to 1936.

The Berlin Olympic Village was built 18 km west of the Reichssportfeld.

The Olympic cauldron contained within the stadium used propane to keep Olympic Flame burning continually. The propane in the cauldron was first tested 28 May 1936.

Another venue that was built for the Olympics was the Haus des Deutschen Sports.

Also in the Westend, not far from the Reichssportfeld complex, were the Deutschlandhalle and Mommsenstadion, which also served as venues of the 1936 Summer Olympics. The Deutschlandhalle hosted the wrestling competition, the weightlifting competition, and the boxing competition. It also hosted other events during the Olympics, such as the "Festival for the Participants", which was held on the final day of the Olympics. The Mommestadion hosted four matches of the football competition. The Mommsenstadion still exists today, but the Deutschlandhalle was demolished in 2011.

The Reichsportfeld's reflected the chauvinistic ideology of the Nazi regime not only in its architectural composition, but also through statues and engravings celebrating Aryan athletic youth. The four stone pylons of Maifeld were named "Frisian", "Franconian", "Saxon", and "Swabian" after early Germanic tribes. The Dietrich Eckart amphitheatre furthered the fabricated Greco-German links to the new regime.

When the Reichssportfeld was finished, it was 1.32 square kilometres (325 acres). The complex could be described as being designed on Wagnerian scale. It consisted of (east to west): the Olympiastadion, the Maifeld (Mayfield, capacity of 50,000) and the Dietrich Eckart amphitheatre (capacity of 25,000), in addition to various places, buildings and facilities for different sports (such as football, swimming, equestrian, and field hockey) in the northern part.

==== 1936 Olympics ( 1–16 August 1936) ====
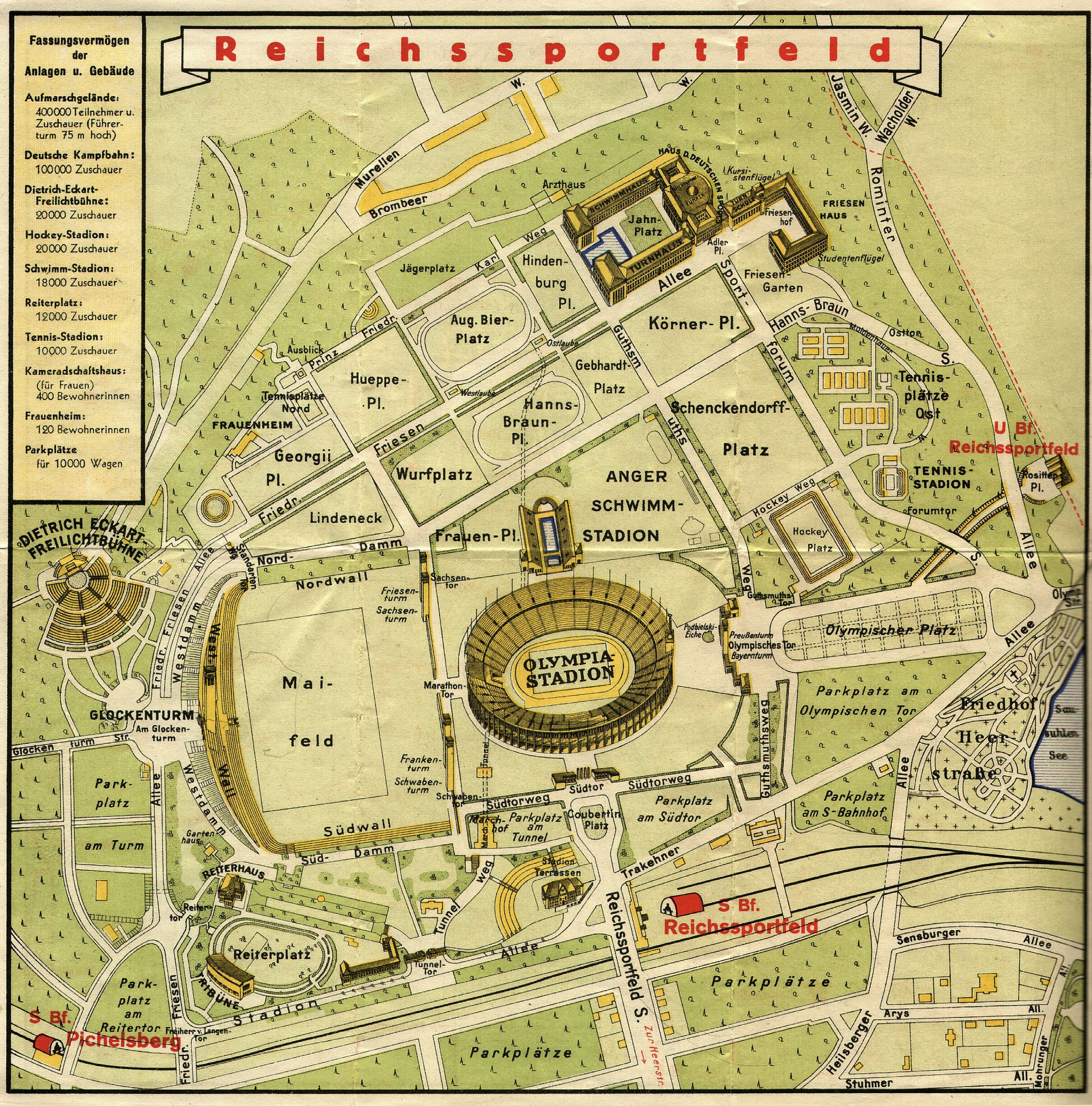
The Reichssportfeld in 1936

The 1936 Olympics were held from 1 to 16 August. The opening ceremony climaxed with the end of the Olympic Torch Relay lighting of the Olympic flame in the Olympic cauldron. The Olympic Flame was a tradition originated during the previous two Summer Olympics, held in Amsterdam and Los Angeles, and the torch relay first occurred at the 1936 games. Carl Diem, who himself was not a Nazi, had thought of the idea, which was approved greatly by Propaganda Minister Joseph Goebbels, as he believed that it was a spectacular way in which to publicize the Olympics.

Many of the more memorable moments of the 1936 Olympics took place within the Reichssportfeld, such as African-American runner Jesse Owens’ four track and field medals at the Olympic Stadium.

At the beginning of the games the "International Congress of Physical Education Students" met in the 1,200 spectator Cupola Hall of the Sportforum, which also hosted the foils and saber fencing competitions. Fencing was also held in the larger gymnasium, where fencing floors and temporary stands for 500 spectators were built. Each of these venues held four fencing floors.

The Olympic Stadium hosted the opening and closing ceremonies, athletics, equestrian jumping, four matches of the football competition, two matches of the handball competition, as well as the baseball demonstration. The stadium was also the site of both the starting line and the finishing line of the marathon.

The Olympic Stadium also hosted numerous performances during the Olympics. One such show was the "Festival Play", which was performed on 1 August 3, 7,18, and 19. Other performances that took place during the games at the Olympic Stadium included "Music and Dances of Nations" (10 August) and the "Military Concert" (13 August).

The Maifeld held the dressage and polo competitions. For dressage two 28,000-person stands were temporarily erected perpendicular to the main grandstand of the Maifeld, as with a temporary 6,000-person stand erected parallel to the main grandstand.. This allowed for the use of just the center portion of the main Maifeld grandstand, creating a more intimate venue for dressage. For the polo competition the entire grandstand, which held 44,0000 standing spectators and 4,500 seats, was used. For Polo two temporary stands were built on the sides of the Maifeld, perpendicular to the main grandstand, accommodating an additional 75,000 spectators. The stadium also hosted a non-Olympic event called the "Relay of the Continents" on the final day of the Olympic Games.

The Maifield held other events during the Olympics. One such event was the "School Children's Demonstration" held 9 August.

The Tennis Courts and the Tennis Stadium held basketball. The Tennis Courts also held the épée fencing. On the surfaces of courts 1 through 4 basketball courts were built. Additionally wooden stands for spectators along the sides consisted of one row of 112 seats for the press and guests of honour, and standing room for 720 persons on each side. On the west side was a separate platform for the judges. Opposite this, on the east stand, was the announcement board. These venues were located on the eastern edge of the Reich Sports Complex. On each of the south tennis courts two fencing floors were erected, along with stands identical to those erected for the basketball courts.

The Olympic Swimming Stadium hosted diving, swimming component of the modern pentathlon, swimming, and water polo events. The venue also served as a training venue for the sport of swimming.

Field hockey was held at the Hockey Stadiums (Hockey Stadium, and Hockey Stadium #2).

Gymnastics were contested at the Dietrich Eckhart Amphitheatre. The Amphitheatre also hosted various performances during the games. One of the shows that took place at the venue during the Olympics was "Herkales", which was performed on 4 August 7, 16, 18. The venue also hosted the "Olympic Concert" (19 August) and Berlin Youth events ( 2, 5, 6 and 14 August).

Haus des Deutschen Sports (German: House of German Sports) held fencing events, as well as the fencing component of the modern pentathlon.

==== After the Olympics ====
After the Olympics the complex initially saw between twenty and twenty-five large-scale events per year.

The "Hochschule für Leibesübungen" (German: Academy for Athletics), was ordered by Hitler to end all operations, and was replaced by a new school, the "Reichsakademie für Leibesübungen" (German: Reich Academy for Athletics), on 15 April 1936. The school served the purposes of the paramilitary SA sports training under the façade of being a school for physical education.

The final of the 1937 German football championship was played at the Olympic Stadium on 20 June 1937. FC Schalke 04 defeated 1. FC Nuremberg 2–0. After that, all German championship finals were held there until 1944, as well as six German cup finals between 1936 and 1942.

On 28 September 1937, the Reichssportfeld hosted ceremonies celebrating Benito Mussolini's visit to Berlin.

1 May 1939, Hitler used the viewing stand at the Olympic Stadium for his May Day address, in which he expounded upon his theory of "Lebensraum" Exactly four months later (1 September 1939) Hitler acted upon this theory by invading Poland, thus commencing World War II.

North of the main hockey stadium, a large grass field, which held six playing fields and had previously housed a second field hockey stadium for the Olympic preliminaries, was used by the Reich Academy as training grounds, as well as by various sporting associations for competition.

==== World War II ====
In the earlier years of World War II the complex, the "Hitlerjugend", "Army Sports Festivals", and regular "War Championships" as a critical part of the entertainment programs for German troops.

The sports complex had been made well-prepared for wartime early on. The underground areas near the Marathon tunnel had a concrete ceiling and separating walls built to transform them into bunkers. At the beginning of the war, Blaupunkt produced anti-aircraft weapon primers there. When allied bombing of the complex intensified in late 1944, the stadium's underground facilities were prepared for use as a makeshift HQ for Nazi Germany's national radio network, "Großdeutscher Rundfunk".

The administration building to the north of the Olympischer Platz was used as an ammunition depot, with other buildings of the complex used to house stockpiles of food and wine.

The Reichssportfeld was heavily bombed by Allied forces during the Second World War. The Olympic Stadium sustained some damage, but was nevertheless in relatively good condition.

12 November 1944, the Olympischer Platz was one of ten sites where Hitler's last contingents were sworn in.

The Bell Tower was used by the Nazis to store archives, including films. The Bell Tower was the only major component of the sports complex to be destroyed during the war. The Red Army troops set the contents of the tower, the film stored by the Nazis, on fire, turning the tower itself into a makeshift chimney. The tower was severely damaged and weakened by the fire. The administration building near the Olympischer Platz was destroyed after the stored ammunition exploded.

==== Post–World War (1945–1949) ====
After Germany's unconditional surrender in May 1945, the Reichssportfeld had been scarred with bomb craters, emptied ammunition boxes, burnt equipment, barricades, and corpses.

Much of the damage from World War II was repaired once the war ended. In fact, only days after Germany's unconditional surrender in May 1945, the area of the former Reichssportfeld was cleaned up.

Carl Diem, the Secretary General of the Organizing Committee of the Olympic Games, made himself the director of the ‘Reichssportfeld’ administration, and along with other former employees of the complex, helped to begin the clean-up process.

20 June 1945, Diem opened the Swim Stadium, which was largely undamaged, to the public.

After the Red Army retreated from the portion of the city that contained the complex, British troops took control of the Sportfeld on 1 July 1945. The British Army closed the Olympic Park, as they wanted to use the complex themselves.

In 1952 the British Army in Berlin set up their headquarter on the Sportforum. They also used the sports facilities, and set up a cricket field on Körnerplatz, in front the Haus des Deutschen Sports.

The Queen's Official Birthday was celebrated by British military occupying forces on the Maifeld annually, and the British military also used the Maifeld for sports such as cricket. Since 2012, the Mailfeld, having enough space for two cricket fields, is home to the cricket clubs of Berlin, after they had to give up the Körnerplatz.

Due to the damage in incurred, the Olympic Bell Tower was demolished by British engineers on 15 February 1947. The Olympic Bell, which was contained inside, had survived the fire, and fell along with the tower when it was demolished. As the result of its 77-meter fall with the tower, the bell cracked has since been unable to ring. To prevent the bell from falling victim to metal hunters, it was buried in the Olympic Square.

Former heavyweight world champion Max Schmeling held a boxing match, in the amphitheatre, which had been renamed the "Waldbühne", on 31 October 1948, in front of an audience of 24,000. This was ultimately his final bout.

Control of the Sportfeld was handed over to the German authorities on 12 June 1949. Exactly one year later, the Berlin Senate decided to rename the "Reichssportfeld" the "Olympiapark Berlin".

=== Olympiapark Berlin (1949–present) ===
==== Post–World War II and Cold War era (1949–1989) ====
The West German football championship final was held at the Olympic Stadium six times between 1950 and 1962, before the introduction of the Bundesliga.

The Olympic Plaza had a giant antenna built in 1951 that transmitted signals for transistor radios in Berlin.

In 1956 the Olympic Bell was unburied, but only so that it could serve as a practice target for anti-tank ammunition.

The Bell Tower was rebuilt from 1960 and 1962 according to Werner March's original blueprints. This came as the result of efforts by Werner March, among others, to rebuild the bell tower. This tower is almost one meter taller than the original one in height. During the reconstruction of the bell tower, the "Langemarckhalle", as it had been destroyed when the tower was demolished. The Olympic Bell Tower has since become a popular tourist site, providing panoramic views of Berlin, of Berlin, Spandau the Havel valley, Potsdam, Nauen and Hennigsdorf. The Olympic Bell has been placed outside the Olympic Stadium to serve as a memorial. The Bell Tower contains a replica of the original Olympic Bell instead.

Inside the Olympic Stadium, "Führerloge" on the Honorary Stand was decreased in height by a meter to eliminate the visual effect it historically possessed, and to assist in "de-nazi-fying" the stadium.

On 24 August 1963 Hertha BSC played their first regular match at the Olympic Stadium, moving to the venue after joining the Bundesliga. The match was a 1–1 tie against 1. FC Nürnberg. In 1965, the German Football Association found Hertha BSC guilty of bribery and relegated them to the Regionalliga Berlin. Hertha had illegally bribed several football players in an attempt to add them to the team, following their disinterest in playing in Berlin because of recent construction the Berlin Wall in 1961. Hertha moved out of the Olympic Stadium, and back into their old home at the "Plumpe", until rejoining the first division in 1968. In 1971, Hertha BSC sold off the "Plumpe". Other teams have also used the Olympic Stadium, like Tasmania, Tennis Borussia and Blau-Weiß 90 when they played in the Bundesliga.

In 1966, the former "Reichssportfeld" was placed under the "Monument Conservation of West Berlin". In November 1966, a new floodlight system was installed at the Olympic Stadium.

In 1969, the original ash-covered running track was replaced by synthetic one made of Rekortan. The new material was being tested at the Berlin Olympic Stadium before it was installed at the Olympic Stadium for the 1972 Summer Olympics in Munich, West Germany.

The Olympic Stadium was renovated for the 1974 FIFA World Cup hosted by West Germany. This renovation most notably included the addition of a partial roof over the stadium's main tribunes in the northern and southern stands, covering 26,000 seats. The roof was designed by Dübbers and Krahe. This roof, a modern construction made of Plexiglas and steel, provided a modern and light in appearance which aesthetically contrasted the traditional and heavy construction of the original stadium. The renovation also added press stands, modernized the restrooms, and separated the reporters trench from the stands with a Plexiglas wall.

The late 1970s were a successful era for Hertha BSC at the Olympic Stadium, reaching the semi-finals of the UEFA Cup in 1979 and the finals of the German Cup both in 1977 and 1979. After a decline through the 1980s, Hertha fell into the Amateur-Oberliga Berlin in 1986 and moved to the smaller Poststadion. Hertha recovered, and joined the 2. Bundesliga for the 1988–1989 season, and returned to the Olympic Stadium.

In 1972 the Summer Olympics again were held in Germany, with West Germany hosting the games in Munich. The main concentrations of venues for these games were also organized in an Olympic Park.

Since 1985, the Olympic Stadium has hosted all DFB-Pokal finals, and from 1985 to 2009 also the women's DFB-Pokal finals.

==== Decade of German reunification (1989–1999) ====
After the fall of the Berlin Wall in November 1989, a match was held 27 January 1990, between Hertha and East Berlin's FC Union at the Olympic Stadium. 50,000 spectators attended.

The Olympic Stadium's Hertha BSC rejoined first division for their 1990 season, but fell back to the second division in 1991. Hertha would remain in the second division until they rejoined the first division in 1997. The Olympic Stadium's Hertha BCS has continued to improve since rejoining the first division, gaining international prestige by qualifying for the UEFA Champions League.

Berlin had originally been planning to bid for the 2004 Summer Olympics, but instead decided in November 1989 to bid for the 2000 Olympics. The Olympic Park was to play a major role in the Olympics had Berlin's bid for the 2000 Summer Olympics been successful. On 23 September 1993, Berlin was voted out in the second round of the IOC vote.

On 8 September 1994, after over a half-century, the British military completely ended their military presence at the Olympic Park. A northern section of the park was reopened to the public, no longer being occupied by the British military. British Prime Minister John Major and Governing Mayor of Berlin Eberhard Diepgen revealed a commemorative plaque on the Adlerplatz in front of the "Haus des Deutschen Sports" in a ceremony marking the date.

The fate of the Olympic Stadium was debated in 1998. Due to its Nazi origins, some advocated demolishing it to replace it with a new stadium, while others preferred to let it slowly deteriorate much like the Colosseum.

There were a number of plans that entailed the demolition of the stadium, but on 26 May 1998, the Berlin Senate instead voted to renovate the stadium. 1 December 1998, the Senate voted in favor of the plan by "von Gerkan, Marg and Partner (gmp)". 9 May 2000, an agreement for the funding of the stadium was reached with Walter Bau-AG.

==== A new millennium ====
To go along with the start of the new millennium, the park received a modernized Olympic Stadium. As part of Germany's preparations for the 2006 FIFA World Cup the Olympic Stadium received a complete renovation. Construction at the Olympic Stadium began in September 2000. The renovation provided the Olympic Stadium with a new roof made of a semitransparent Teflon membrane (more specifically made of a PTFE-coated glass fiber). The material used provides an even lighter appearance than the roof installed for the 1974 World Cup had. Much like the roof installed for the 1974 World Cup had, the lightness and transparency of the new roof provides a visual contrast to the heaviness of the stadium's construction. The roof mimics the tiers of seating by providing a gap at the Marathon Gate. Unlike the roof that was installed for the 1974 World Cup, this roof covered all of the stadium's seating. The roof appears almost to float above the stadium. The new roof is supported by 20 steel columns interior, the distance between each ranging from 32 to 40 meters. The roof is also supported by 132 exterior columns, which are located completely outside of the seating area. The roof rises 68 metres over the seats, and 39.99 meters over the field-level. The weight of the roof is 3,500 tons. The roof's construction is 42,000 m^{2} consisting of a 27,000 m^{2} upper roof membrane distributed into 77 sectors, a 28,000 m^{2} lower roof membrane, and a 6006 m^{2} glass surface. The renovation preserved the stadium's running track. The renovation also repaired the stone of the original stadium construction, rebuilt the lower tier of seats at a new angle, and lowered the playing field by 2.65 meters (8.7 feet). The renovation also added state-of-the-art lighting and sound. The renovation also created 76 new VIP boxes in the inner gallery between the lower and upper seating rings, and 13 new skyboxes were installed within the former press stands of the upper ring. A number of new restaurants were added to the stadium during the renovation. A chapel was built inside the stadium as well, and was opened just prior to the World Cup. The chapel construction project wound up receiving the "iF Gold Award", and in 2007 the "red dot award". The renovated Olympic Stadium possesses the largest seating capacity of German stadiums at 74,500. It also has a total 113 VIP stands, and two underground parking garages accommodating 630 cars.

The renovation began on 3 July 2000, with a groundbreaking ceremony officiated by Chancellor of Germany Gerhard Schröder, Mayor of Berlin Eberhard Diepgen, Franz Beckenbauer and Dr. Ignaz Walter. The stadium continued to host events during the renovation, including the annual DFB-Pokal final, Hertha BSC, and Berlin Thunder games. 9 January 2002, in the midst of the Olympic Stadium's renovation, construction crews found an unexploded World War II bomb buried beneath a seating section. Berlin police defused the bomb outside of the stadium.

The new stadium was inaugurated in a ceremony on 31 July 2004. Work nonetheless continued on the stadium and the surrounding areas of the Olympiapark until 2006. The 2006 FIFA World Cup final was held at the stadium on 9 July.

The Germany national football team played their first match at the stadium 8 September 2004, in a 1–1 tie against the Brazil national football team.

The Olympic Stadium project has received multiple awards and recognition. In 2004 the Olympic Stadium renovation won the German Steel Building Award. In April 2005 the UEFA officially awarded the Olympiastadion Berlin as a "Five-Star-Stadia", the highest ranking possible for European stadiums. Other honors the stadium received in 2005 include the Light Architecture Awards for "Modification, Restoration, and Roof-construction". The renovation also received recognition from the German Architecture Awards for "Modification, Restoration, and Roof-construction" In 2006 the Olympic Stadium won the Architecture Award Berlin. In 2007 the Olympic Stadium won the IOC/AKS Award in Golf, an IPC/IAKS Special-award, the BDA Architecture award for "best ambience". In 2013 the stadium received the FM Efficiency Award. In 2014 the Olympic Stadium received the Location Award 2014 second place category honor for "Major Events" and the first place category honor for "Stadiums, Arenas, and Multi-function-halls".

In 2004, Hertha constructed the Amateurstadion, a 5,400 person capacity stadium located near the Olympic Stadium. Their second team plays there.

In 2005 the antenna in the Olympic Plaza was removed.

Prior to hosting the 2009 IIAF World Championships in Athletics, the Olympic Stadium's track was re-surfaced. The new track was colored blue, the team color of Hertha BSC.

From 2010 until 2012 a new ice arena complex (the Eisporthalle) was constructed for 4 million euros at a former parking lot of the complex.

The Olympiapark would have been used had Berlin been selected as Germany's bid city for the 2024 Summer Olympics. German instead chose Hamburg and its bid over Berlin. Hamburg ultimately dropped out of the bid process during the candidate city phase.

The Olympiapark was one of the main venues of the 2023 Special Olympics World Summer Games.

== Venues ==
=== Current ===
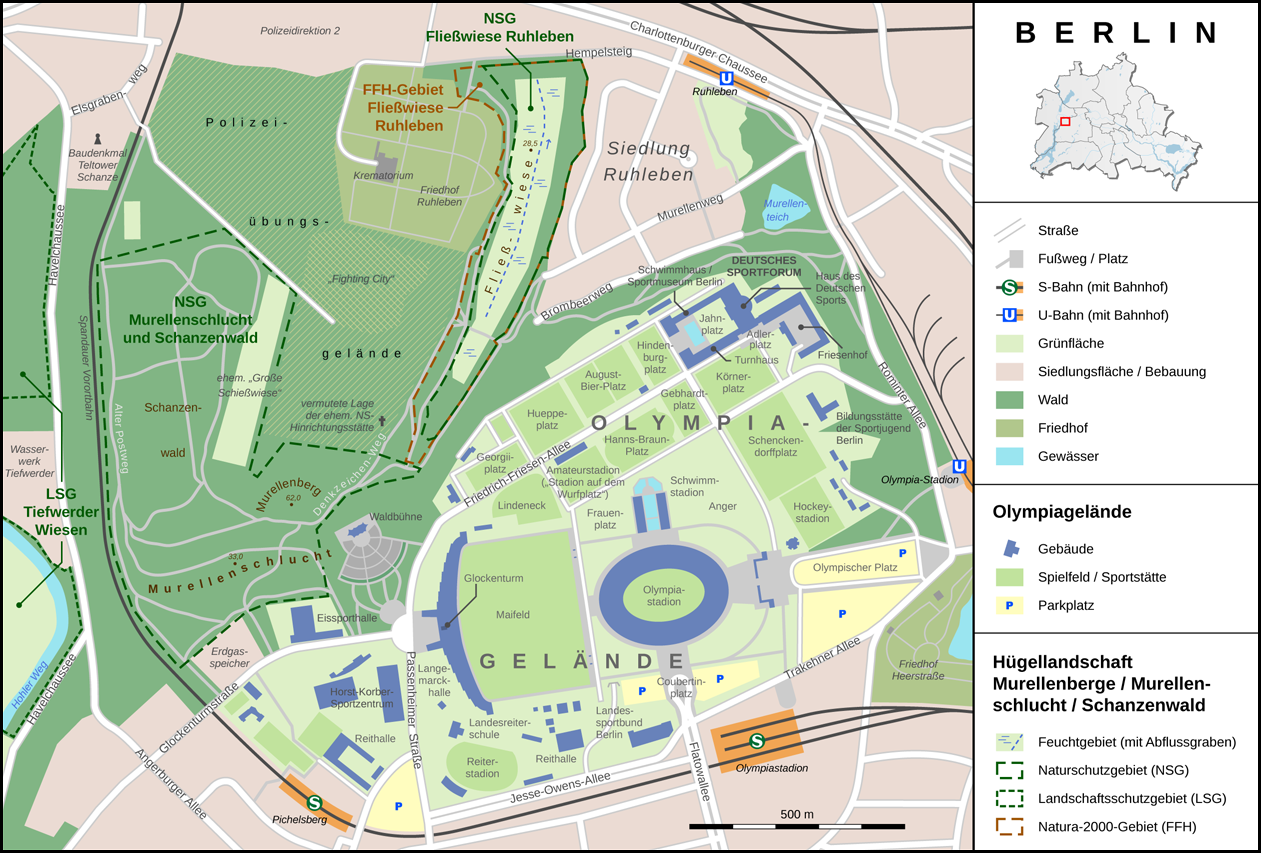
Map of the Olympiapark

- The Amateurstadion Berlin is a 5,400 spectator capacity stadium. The capacity allows 4,300 standing places and 1,100 seats (of which 750 are covered). This venue was added to the complex in 2004. The stadium is officially named Stadion auf dem Wurfplatz.
- Deutsches Sportforum (lit. 'German Sportforum')
  - Cupola Hall is a 1,200 spectator auditorium which hosted part of the foils and sabre fencing competitions as well as the "International Congress of Physical Education Students" during the 1936 Summer Olympics
  - Gymnasium is a gym that started construction in 1926, but was put on hold in 1928 due to a lack of funding. Its construction was resumed in 1934, and completed in 1936. The gymnasium held portions of the foils and sabre fencing competitions during the 1936 Summer Olympics.
  - Schwimmhaus
  - Sportmuseum Berlin (lit. 'Sport Museum Berlin')
- Eisporthalle (lit. 'Ice Sports Hall') is an ice rink complex that contains two 60x30 meter ice rinks. One rink is entirely indoors, and has seating for 1,000 spectators. The second rink is enclosed by walls on 3 sides, and open on the fourth side.
- Haus des Deutschen Sports (lit. 'House of German Sports') is a venue that was built for the 1936 Summer Olympics. It is located northeast of the Olympic Stadium. It held part of the fencing competition and the fencing component of the modern pentathlon competition of the 1936 Olympics.
- Maifeld (lit. 'Mayfield') was created as a huge lawn (112,000 square metres, 28 acres) for gymnastic demonstrations, specifically annual May Day celebrations by Hitler's government. In more recent years the Maifeld has also hosted many concerts.

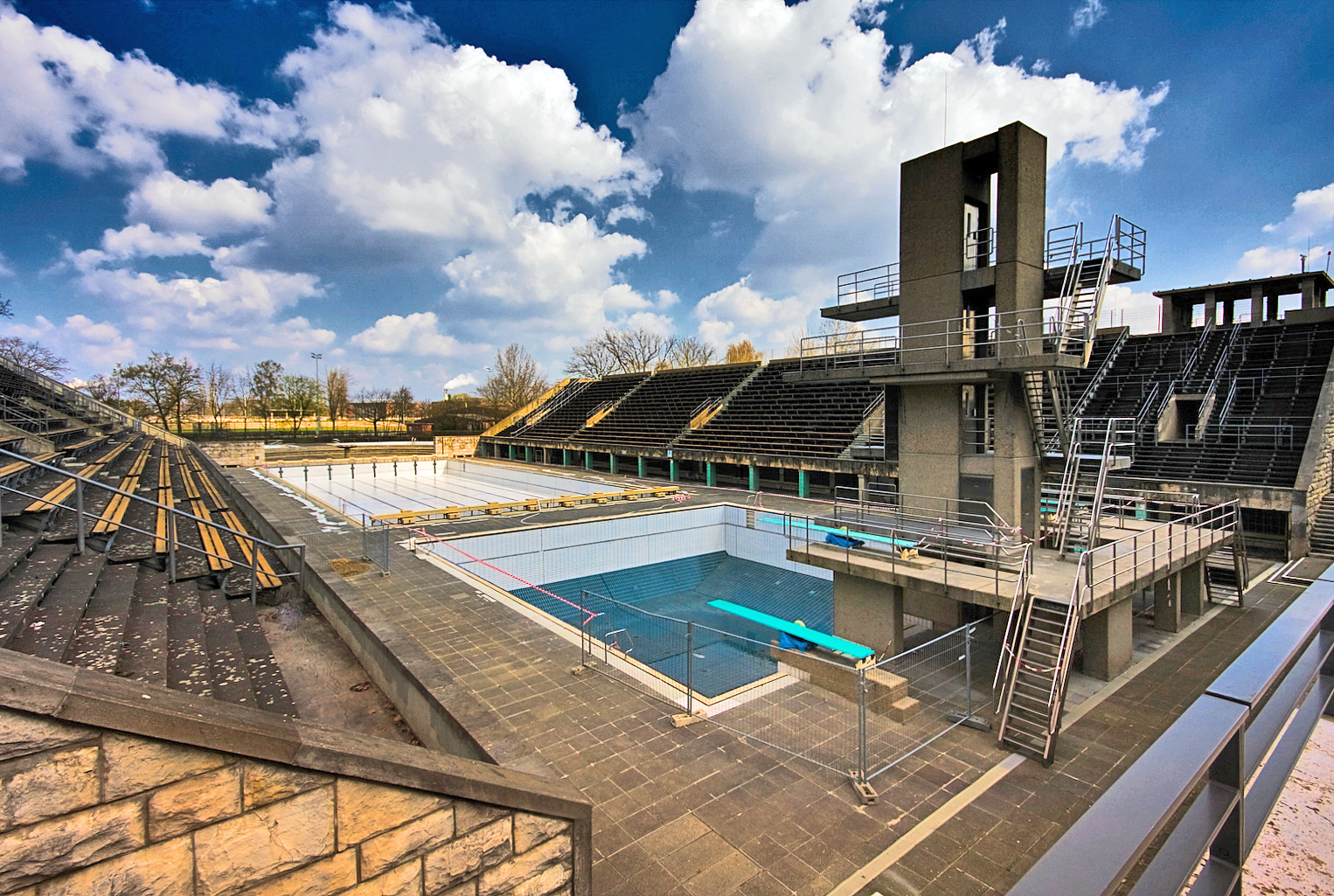
Swimming Stadium in 2008

- Olympiapark Schwimmstadion Berlin (lit. 'Berlin Olympic Swim Stadium') is an aquatics venue located in Berlin, Germany, constructed for the 1936 Summer Olympics. Located north of the Olympic Stadium, it hosted the diving, swimming, water polo, and the swimming part of the modern pentathlon events.
- Olympiastadion: a 74,064 stadium located in the southern part of the park. It was built for the 1936 Olympic Games.
- Reitsport-Anlagen Am Olympiastadion (lit. 'Riding-Facilities at the Olympic Stadium') are equestrian facilities located in the Olympiapark
  - Landesreiterschule (lit. 'National Riding School')
  - Reiter-stadion (lit. 'Rider-stadium') is an equestrian stadium
- Tennis Courts are a series of tennis courts in the complex. These courts hosted the épée fencing and basketball competitions of the 1936 Summer Olympics.
- Tennis Stadium is a tennis venue within the complex. It hosted the basketball competition, épée fencing component of the modern pentathlon competition.
- Waldbühne (lit. 'Woodland Stage' or Forest Stage): an amphitheatre seating over 22,000 spectators. It was designed by German architect Werner March in emulation of a Greek theatre and built between 1934 and 1936 as the Dietrich-Eckart-Bühne (Dietrich Eckart Stage), a Nazi thingplatz for the 1936 Summer Olympics. Since World War II it has been used for a variety of events, including boxing matches, film showings and classical and rock concerts. The venue is located off Friedrich-Friesen-Allee just northeast of Glockenturmstraße. For the 1936 Olympics it had a capacity of 20,000 spectators, and held various performances, in addition to holding the gymnastics competition.
- Hockey Stadion was an 18,000 seat stadium, one of two that hosted the 1936 Olympic field hockey competition It remains as a modern hockey field.

==== Other facilities ====
- Olympic Square is a large plaza located in front of the Olympic Stadium. In the center of this plaza lie two towers, 156 feet tall, with the Olympic Rings suspended between them. To the east of this plaza is the Bell Tower, located at a location on an axis with the center point between the two towers. This plaza was built for the 1936 Olympics. Its two towers were built to architecturally accentuate the longitudinally symmetrical arrangement of the complex.
  - Olympic Bell Tower (or Glockenturm, the German term for a bell tower)
- Olympischer Platz is a former parade grounds

=== Former ===
- Deutsches Stadion (lit. 'German Stadium') aka Olympiastadion (lit. 'Olympic Stadium') was a multi-use stadium initially used as the stadium of German football championship matches. The stadium was built in 1913, and demolished in 1933. It was replaced by the current Olympic Stadium in 1936. The capacity of the stadium was 40,000 spectators. Located in the Grunewald Race Course, it was intended to host the 1916 Summer Olympics that were cancelled due to World War I.
- Grunewald Race Course: a horse racing-track in the Grunewald Forest. Belonging to the Berliner Rennverein, the course was designed by Otto March. The racecourse opened in 1909, the racetrack existed until 1934, when its demolition was required to make room for the Olympic Stadium.
- Hockey Stadion No. 2 was a 3,200-seat stadium, one of two that hosted the 1936 Olympic field hockey competitions. It was a temporary venue, and primarily hosted the Olympic preliminary matches for field hockey.

== Sport events ==
=== Annual events ===
- DFB-Pokal at Olympic Stadium
- Frauen DFB Pokal at Olympic Stadium
- Internationales Stadionfest at Olympic Stadium
- Spring final round of the DFB Cup
- ISTAF Berlin since 1921. Was first held at Deutsches Stadium, moved to the Olympic Stadium, held there since.

=== Notable sporting events ===
- 1936 Summer Olympics
- European Maccabi Games 2015

==== American football ====
- 1990, 1991, 1992, 1993, and 1994 American Bowls at Olympic Stadium

==== Association football ====
- 1974 FIFA World Cup matches at Olympic Stadium
- With the demolition of the Berlin Wall in November 1989, a spontaneous feeling of sympathy between Hertha BSC and FC Union from Eastern Berlin arose, which culminated in a friendly match at the Olympiastadion with 50,000 spectators (27 January 1990).
- 8 September 2004, Brazil played Germany at the Olympic Stadium, shortly after the re-inauguration of the stadium.
- 2006 FIFA World Cup matches at Olympic Stadium, including the final match
- 2007 DFB Cup Final
- 2008 UEFA Cup
- 2015 UEFA Champions League Final at Olympic Stadium

==== Athletics ====
- 2009 IAAF World Championships in Athletics at the Olympic Stadium.

==== Baseball ====
- 10 August 1936, an Olympic baseball exhibition game was held between two American baseball teams at the Olympic Stadium with an attendance thought to be over 100,000 (possibly 110,000), considered the world record for the attendance of a baseball game at that time.

==== Boxing ====
- 31 October 1948, 24,000 attended former Heavyweight World Champion Max Schmeling held his final boxing match, at the Waldbühne audience of 24,000.

==== Gymnastics ====
- 2005 International German Gymnastics Festival at the Olympic Stadium.

== Notable entertainment events ==
- Opening and closing ceremonies of the 1936 Olympics
- Closing ceremony of the 2006 World Cup
- The reinauguration celebrations of the newly renovated Olympic Stadium were carried out on 31 July 2004, and 1 August 2004. Celebrations began with performances from P!nk, Nena and Daniel Barenboim. It climaxed at night with the opening ceremony. On the second day, friendly matches were played between different levels of the club Hertha BSC and numerous visiting teams.

=== Other events ===
- Benito Mussolini's visit to Berlin climaxed with an event at the Olympic Stadium on 20 June 1937. Joseph Goebbels had estimated that more than three million people partook in the ceremony, whether along the parade route to the Reichsportfeld, inside the Olympic Stadium, or outside of the stadium on the Mayfield.
- Inaugural Pyronale, a two-day international pyrotechnics competition at the Olympic Stadium in 2006. Drew 50,000 spectators.
- 2007 Pyronale Fireworks World Championships was held at the Mayfield in September.
- 2008 Pyronale Fireworks World Championships was held on the Mayfield.

== Nearby attractions ==
- Unité d'Habitation of Berlin
