= 2023 Special Olympics World Summer Games =

Multi-sport event in Berlin, Germany

16th Special Olympics World Summer Games: 16. Special Olympics Weltspiele
- Host city: Berlin, Germany
- Motto: #UnbeatableTogether (German: #ZusammenUnschlagbar)
- Nations: 178
- Athletes: 6,500
- Events: 26 Sports
- Opening: 17 June
- Closing: 25 June
- Opened by: Frank-Walter Steinmeier
- Torch lighter: Sophie Rensmann
- Main venue: Olympiapark Berlin
- Website: Official website

Summer

Winter

The 2023 Special Olympics World Summer Games, officially known as the XVI Special Olympic World Games or Special Olympics World Games Berlin 2023 (German: Special Olympics Weltspiele 2023), were the 16th summer Special Olympics. Held in Berlin, Germany, the Special Olympics lasted nine days, from 17 to 25 June 2023. It marked the first time that Germany has hosted the Special Olympics World Games. About 6,500 athletes and unified partners from approximately 178 countries competed in 26 sports, supported by 3,000 coaches and 18,000 volunteers.

== Host selection ==
The bid process was opened in November 2017. Berlin, Germany was selected as the host city on 13 November 2018 at the Global Athlete Congress in Santo Domingo, Dominican Republic. On 30 January 2020, Berlin was officially confirmed as the host city for the games.

== Venues ==
Events took place in fifteen venues:

- Olympiapark Berlin
  - Olympiastadion (opening ceremony)
  - August-Bier-Platz (futsal)
  - Eissporthalle Charlottenburg (roller skating)
  - Hanns-Braun-Stadion (athletics)
  - Hockey-Stadion (field hockey)
  - Horst-Korber-Sportzentrum (handball)
  - Maifeld (football)
  - Reitclub am Olympiapark (equestrian)
- Messe Berlin (badminton, basketball, bocce, artistic gymnastics, rhythmic gymnastics, judo, powerlifting, table tennis, volleyball)
- SC Brandenburg Berlin (tennis)
- Neptunbrunnen (3x3 basketball)
- Straße des 17. Juni (cycling, closing ceremony)
- BeachMitte (beach volleyball)
- Schwimm- und Sprunghalle im Europasportpark (SSE) (swimming)
- Wannsee (sailing)
- Bowling World on Mercedes-Platz (bowling)
- regatta course Grünau (kayak, open water swimming)
- Golf Club Bad Saarow (golf)

== The Games ==
=== Ceremonies ===
==== Opening ceremony ====
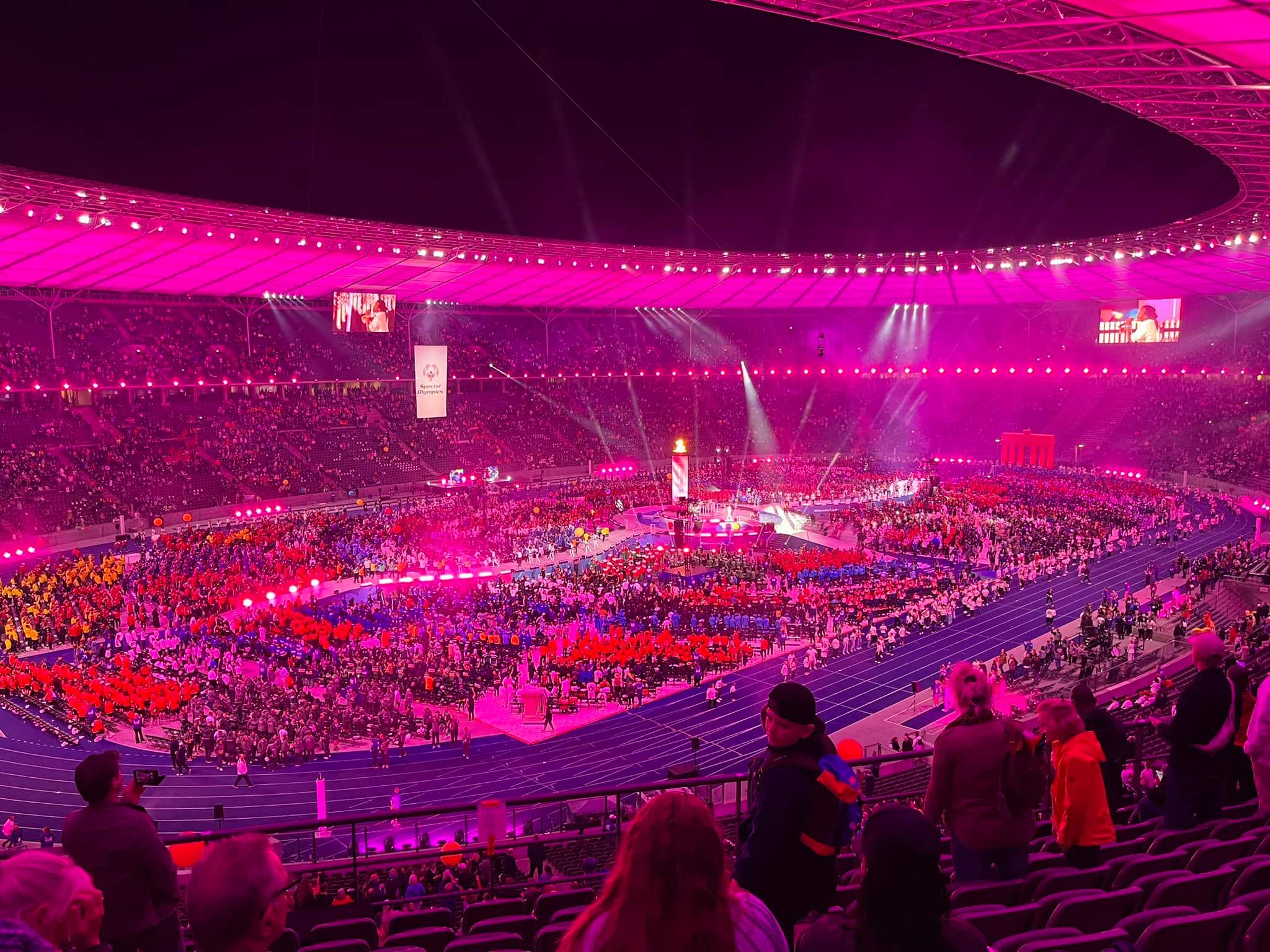
Opening Ceremony

The opening ceremony was held at the Olympiastadion on 17 June 2023. President of Germany Frank-Walter Steinmeier opened the games officially. Special Olympics chairman Timothy Shriver, German chancellor Olaf Scholz, Mayor of Berlin Kai Wegner, and former Olympic athletes Dirk Nowitzki and Felix Neureuther also took part in the ceremony. The torch was lit by Special Olympic tennis player Sophie Rensmann. Blue Man Group took part in a couple musical performances during the ceremony.

==== Closing ceremony ====
The closing ceremony was held on Straße des 17. Juni in front of the Brandenburg Gate on 25 June 2023.

=== Sports ===
Competitions were held in the following 26 sports:

2023 Special Olympics World Summer Games
- Aquatics
  - Open water swimming
  - Swimming
- Athletics
- Badminton
- Basketball
- Basketball 3x3
- Beach volleyball
- Bocce
- Bowling
- Cycling
- Equestrian
- Field hockey
- Cricket
- Football
- Futsal
- Golf
- Gymnastics
  - Artistic gymnastics
  - Rhythmic gymnastics
- Handball
- Judo
- Kayaking
- Powerlifting
- Roller skating
- Sailing
- Table tennis
- Tennis
- Volleyball

Basketball 3x3 made its debut at the Special Olympics and Field Hockey was featured as a demonstration sport.

=== Medals ===
The top three finishers of each competition were honored with gold, silver and bronze medals, while the fourth to eighth-place finishers received ribbons with their placement printed on them. More than 4000 medals and 6600 placement ribbons were presented at 1,334 award ceremonies.

==== Medal table ====
Unlike the Olympic and Paralympic Games the Special Olympics do not provide an official medal table, since there is supposed to be no competitive pressure among the nations. Apart from the medals and placement ribbons, participants who were disqualified or did not finish their competition were also awarded with participation ribbons in order to promote sportsmanship.

* Host nation (Germany)

Medals won by participating delegations
Rank	Nation	Gold	Silver	Bronze	Total
1	Germany*	79	72	96	247
2	China	56	36	27	119
3	Great Britain	49	36	18	103
4	Canada	46	20	29	95
5	India	41	46	25	112
6	Hong Kong	39	25	12	76
7	Belgium	34	29	17	80
8	United States	32	45	33	110
9	Hungary	30	26	16	72
10	Bangladesh	25	4	5	34
11	Greece	24	15	24	63
12	Italy	23	29	24	76
13	Costa Rica	23	28	37	88
14	Switzerland	23	22	10	55
15	South Korea	23	21	16	60
16	Finland	23	18	13	54
17	Ireland	22	19	30	71
18	Lithuania	22	11	4	37
19	United Arab Emirates	19	21	26	66
20	Romania	18	18	7	43
21	Puerto Rico	18	17	12	47
22	Netherlands	17	16	28	61
23	Paraguay	17	14	12	43
24	Norway	16	22	12	50
25	Egypt	16	13	22	51
26	Chinese Taipei	16	13	10	39
27	Malta	16	11	5	32
28	Poland	15	26	16	57
29	Australia	15	22	26	63
30	Macau	15	12	8	35
31	Kenya	15	4	6	25
32	Iceland	14	16	13	43
33	Sweden	14	7	12	33
34	Austria	13	16	16	45
35	Mexico	13	8	11	32
36	Venezuela	11	12	16	39
37	Pakistan	10	20	18	48
38	Slovakia	10	16	13	39
39	Spain	10	13	15	38
40	Thailand	10	11	5	26
41	Kazakhstan	10	10	14	34
42	South Africa	10	9	7	26
43	Israel	10	8	8	26
44	Indonesia	10	5	8	23
45	Ivory Coast	10	5	6	21
46	Denmark	9	19	15	43
47	Estonia	9	14	13	36
48	Japan	9	7	10	26
49	Jamaica	9	5	4	18
50	Cyprus	8	14	9	31
51	Czech Republic	8	12	6	26
52	Portugal	8	11	8	27
53	Saudi Arabia	8	6	10	24
54	Monaco	8	6	5	19
55	Dominican Republic	8	4	2	14
56	El Salvador	7	15	9	31
57	Ecuador	7	11	11	29
58	Kuwait	7	9	4	20
59	Syria	7	8	10	25
60	Brazil	7	8	9	24
61	Libya	7	6	9	22
62	Serbia	7	6	6	19
63	Panama	7	4	8	19
64	Jordan	7	3	10	20
65	Palestine	7	2	2	11
66	Oman	6	9	14	29
67	Slovenia	6	8	4	18
68	Bulgaria	6	5	9	20
69	Bolivia	6	5	6	17
70	Azerbaijan	6	4	13	23
71	Chile	6	4	4	14
72	Bahrain	6	2	3	11
72	Malawi	6	2	3	11
74	Singapore	6	2	2	10
75	New Zealand	5	17	12	34
76	Uzbekistan	5	13	14	32
77	Guatemala	5	10	7	22
78	France	5	9	11	25
79	Ukraine	5	9	7	21
80	Colombia	5	9	6	20
81	Trinidad and Tobago	5	7	8	20
82	Gibraltar	5	7	4	16
83	Luxembourg	5	5	7	17
84	Faroe Islands	5	5	5	15
85	Honduras	5	3	6	14
86	Saint Kitts and Nevis	5	0	3	8
87	Burkina Faso	4	6	5	15
88	Malaysia	4	5	9	18
89	Morocco	4	5	3	12
90	Isle of Man	4	4	10	18
91	Iraq	4	4	4	12
92	Latvia	4	3	2	9
93	Nauru	4	2	2	8
94	Philippines	4	1	1	6
95	Uruguay	3	12	9	24
96	Fiji	3	6	6	15
97	San Marino	3	6	3	12
98	Peru	3	6	2	11
99	Argentina	3	5	2	10
100	Tunisia	3	5	1	9
101	Senegal	3	4	5	12
102	Andorra	3	3	5	11
103	Cuba	3	3	2	8
104	Benin	3	2	7	12
105	Iran	3	1	5	9
106	Zambia	3	1	1	5
107	Georgia	3	0	1	4
108	Mongolia	2	6	6	14
109	Mauritius	2	6	5	13
110	Suriname	2	5	13	20
111	Turkmenistan	2	5	4	11
112	Botswana	2	4	1	7
113	Cayman Islands	2	3	8	13
114	Lebanon	2	3	5	10
115	Seychelles	2	2	5	9
116	Zimbabwe	2	2	4	8
117	Liechtenstein	2	2	3	7
118	Aruba	2	2	2	6
118	Curaçao	2	2	2	6
120	Uganda	2	2	1	5
121	Bermuda	2	1	7	10
122	Timor-Leste	2	1	2	5
122	Turkey	2	1	2	5
124	Bhutan	2	1	0	3
124	Bonaire	2	1	0	3
126	Croatia	2	0	4	6
127	Maldives	2	0	1	3
128	Armenia	2	0	0	2
128	Tajikistan	2	0	0	2
130	Nicaragua	1	4	2	7
131	Guadeloupe	1	2	5	8
132	Albania	1	2	2	5
132	Haiti	1	2	2	5
132	North Macedonia	1	2	2	5
135	Guyana	1	2	1	4
135	Namibia	1	2	1	4
137	Bosnia and Herzegovina	1	1	3	5
138	Kosovo	1	1	1	3
138	Rwanda	1	1	1	3
138	Vietnam	1	1	1	3
141	Antigua and Barbuda	1	0	2	3
142	Cameroon	1	0	0	1
142	Guinea	1	0	0	1
142	Mali	1	0	0	1
145	Algeria	0	9	10	19
146	Saint Vincent and the Grenadines	0	4	2	6
147	Dominica	0	4	1	5
148	Bahamas	0	3	1	4
149	Papua New Guinea	0	2	2	4
149	South Sudan	0	2	2	4
151	Belize	0	2	1	3
151	Qatar	0	2	1	3
153	Ghana	0	1	2	3
153	Togo	0	1	2	3
155	Cambodia	0	1	1	2
155	Lesotho	0	1	1	2
155	Montenegro	0	1	1	2
155	Samoa	0	1	1	2
159	DR Congo	0	1	0	1
159	Laos	0	1	0	1
159	Moldova	0	1	0	1
159	Saint Lucia	0	1	0	1
163	Cape Verde	0	0	2	2
163	Kyrgyzstan	0	0	2	2
163	Palau	0	0	2	2
166	Eswatini	0	0	1	1
166	Gambia	0	0	1	1
166	Madagascar	0	0	1	1
166	Tanzania	0	0	1	1
Totals (169 entries)		1,380	1,363	1,317	4,060

== Calendar ==
All times and dates use Central European Summer Time (UTC+2)

OC	Opening ceremony	●	Event competitions	1	Gold medal events	CC	Closing ceremony

June 2023		June									Events
June 2023		17th Sat	18th Sun	19th Mon	20th Tue	21st Wed	22nd Thu	23rd Fri	24th Sat	25th Sun	Events
Ceremonies		OC								CC	—N/a
Aquatics	Marathon swimming		●	5							5
Aquatics	Swimming		●	●	14	9	7	9	5		44
Athletics			●	12	34	19	15	10	6	1	97
Badminton			●	●	●	3	3	2	2		10
Basketball			●	●	●	●	●	●	4		4
Boccia			●	●		1	1	2	2		6
Bowling			●	●	9	2	1	1	1		14
Cycling			●	●	5	2	2	2	1	1	13
Equestrian				●	9	2	2	2	3	2	20
Field hockey			●	●	●	●	●	●	1		1
Football			●	●	●	●	●	2	2		4
Futsal				●	●	●		●	3		3
Golf				●	●	●	5				5
Artistic gymnastics								●	48		48
Rhythmic gymnastics		●	21	44	53	12					130
Handball			●	●	●	●	●	●	2		2
Judo				●	●		6	6	6		18
Kayaking						●	4	●	5		9
Powerlifting				18	21	10	10	10	10		79
Roller skating			●	●	11	2		2	2		17
Sailing				●	●		●	●	3		3
Table tennis			●	●		2	2	2	2		8
Tennis			●	●	●	●	●	8	6		14
Beach volleyball			●	●	●	●	●	●	2		2
Volleyball			●	●	●	●	●	●	2		2
Daily medal events			21	79	156	64	58	58	113	4	553
Cumulative total			21	100	256	320	378	436	549	553	553
June 2023		17th Sat	18th Sun	19th Mon	20th Tue	21st Wed	22nd Thu	23rd Fri	24th Sat	25th Sun	Total events
June 2023		June									Total events

== Participating National Programs ==
Below is a list of all 178 participating delegations. The number of competitors per delegation is indicated in parentheses.

Delegations to the 2023 Special Olympics World Summer Games
- Albania (10)
- Algeria (23)
- Andorra (13)
- Antigua and Barbuda (4)
- Argentina (10)
- Armenia (4)
- Aruba (17)
- Australia (64)
- Austria (74)
- Azerbaijan (49)
- Bahamas (7)
- Bahrain (15)
- Bangladesh (79)
- Belgium (88)
- Belize (4)
- Benin (9)
- Bermuda (19)
- Bhutan (4)
- Bolivia (6)
- Bonaire (6)
- Bosnia and Herzegovina (25)
- Botswana (26)
- Brazil (25)
- Bulgaria (40)
- Burkina Faso (23)
- Burundi (3)
- Cambodia (4)
- Cameroon (2)
- Canada (89)
- Cape Verde (3)
- Cayman Islands (16)
- Chile (38)
- China (89)
- Chinese Taipei (66)
- Colombia (19)
- Costa Rica (104)
- Croatia (12)
- Cuba (11)
- Curaçao (11)
- Cyprus (35)
- Czech Republic (54)
- Democratic Republic of the Congo (4)
- Denmark (68)
- Dominica (8)
- Dominican Republic (13)
- Timor-Leste (6)
- Ecuador (18)
- Egypt (65)
- El Salvador (17)
- Estonia (32)
- Eswatini (2)
- Ethiopia (4)
- Faroe Islands (12)
- Fiji (12)
- Finland (65)
- France (64)
- The Gambia (2)
- Georgia (4)
- Germany (408) (Host)
- Ghana (18)
- Gibraltar (26)
- Great Britain (82)
- Greece (67) (Hellas)
- Guadeloupe (17)
- Guatemala (30)
- Guinea (2)
- Guinea-Bissau (2)
- Guyana (3)
- Haiti (6)
- Honduras (13)
- Hong Kong (81)
- Hungary (77)
- Iceland (30)
- India (195) (Bharat)
- Indonesia (25)
- Iran (24)
- Iraq (24)
- Ireland (73)
- Isle of Man (18)
- Israel (38)
- Italy (96)
- Ivory Coast (73)
- Jamaica (47)
- Japan (45) (Nippon)
- Jordan (20)
- Kazakhstan (53)
- Kenya (66)
- Kosovo (4)
- Kuwait (26)
- Kyrgyzstan (6)
- Laos (3)
- Latvia (20)
- Lebanon (17)
- Lesotho (3)
- Libya (17)
- Liechtenstein (6)
- Lithuania (38)
- Luxembourg (26)
- Macau (40)
- Madagascar (3)
- Malawi (14)
- Malaysia (22)
- Maldives (6)
- Mali (12)
- Malta (28)
- Marshall Islands (2)
- Mauritania (5)
- Mauritius (23)
- Mexico (26)
- Moldova (18)
- Monaco (30)
- Montenegro (10)
- Mongolia (44)
- Morocco (46)
- Mozambique (3)
- Namibia (9)
- Nauru (2)
- Netherlands (59)
- New Zealand (39)
- Nicaragua (18)
- Nigeria (3)
- North Macedonia (19)
- Norway (43)
- Oman (36)
- Pakistan (85)
- Palau (2)
- Palestine (25)
- Panama (18)
- Papua New Guinea (4)
- Paraguay (55)
- Peru (23)
- Philippines (8) (Pilipinas)
- Poland (70)
- Portugal (40)
- Puerto Rico (49)
- Qatar (6)
- Republic of the Congo (2)
- Romania (31)
- Rwanda (16)
- Saint Kitts and Nevis (14)
- Saint Lucia (11)
- Saint Vincent and the Grenadines (9)
- Samoa (11)
- San Marino (14)
- Saudi Arabia (84)
- Senegal (30)
- Serbia (60)
- Seychelles (10)
- Singapore (30)
- Sint Maarten (2)
- Slovakia (51)
- Slovenia (26)
- Spain (76)
- Sweden (41)
- Switzerland (73)
- South Africa (63)
- South Korea (104)
- South Sudan (3)
- Suriname (17)
- Syria (16)
- Tajikistan (4)
- Tanzania (20)
- Thailand (35)
- Togo (6)
- Trinidad and Tobago (16)
- Tunisia (17)
- Turkey (11)
- Turkmenistan (11)
- Uganda (29)
- Ukraine (23)
- United Arab Emirates (101)
- United States (128)
- Uruguay (58)
- Uzbekistan (23)
- Venezuela (21)
- Vietnam (6)
- Zambia (9)
- Zimbabwe (12)

== Marketing ==
=== Logo, branding and slogan ===
The logo and slogan were unveiled on December 14, 2021, at the Sky Deutschland studio. The emblem, which brings together solid colors and images of Berlin, was designed with the help of Special Olympics athletes. During a workshop, they shared their thoughts and feelings about the Games and inclusion. The list of feelings participants chose to be incorporated in the logo, which are represented by shapes and the five main logo colors, are joy, togetherness, excitement, pride and passion. Additionally, iconic symbols of Berlin are used to welcome athletes and visitors to the city. The Berlin Bear, in green, can be found on the city's coat of arms. Logo designers also felt it was important to honor Berlin's ability to overcome a past of separation and isolation after the city was divided at the end of World War II. The Brandenburg Gate, in red, and Fernsehturm Tower, in fuchsia, celebrate a unified city and Berlin as the capital of one Germany. Overall, the logo was created to evoke a sense of unity, diversity, playfulness and connection. The slogan #UnbeatableTogether or in German #ZusammenUnschlagbar represents Togetherness and overcoming borders collectively are main elements of the logo.
