= Malaysia at the 2023 Special Olympics World Summer Games =

- Flag of Malaysia
- IPC code: MAS

in Berlin, Germany 17 June 2023 – 25 June 2023
- Competitors: 22 (11 men and 11 women) in 6 sports
- Medals Ranked 88th: Gold 4 Silver 5 Bronze 9 Total 18

Malaysia competed at the 2023 Special Olympics World Summer Games in Berlin, Germany from 17 to 25 June 2023. The Malaysian contingent consisted of 22 athletes who took part in 6 sporting disciples.

== Competitors ==
Sport	Men	Women	Total
Athletics	2	2	4
Badminton	2	2	4
Bocce	2	2	4
Bowling	3	3	6
Swimming	1	1	2
Table tennis	1	1	2
Total	11	11	22

== Medals summary ==
=== Medalists ===
Medal	Athletes	Sport	Category	Date
Gold	Khairul Zaim Kamarulzaman; Khai Li Lee	Bowling - Mixed Doubles	Division D11	21 June
Gold	Nur Asliza Binti Mohd Sapri	Athletics - Women's Shot Put	Level C Division F01	22 June
Gold	Beverly Chin	Bowling - Women's Singles	Division D43	23 June
Gold	Nurul Shahfinaz Aishira; Tengku Nur Muzafirah	Bocce - Unified Sports Doubles	Division M04	24 June
Silver	Wafi Anas Mohd Kharul Anuar; Raevankumar Selvakumaran; Nurul Shahfinaz Aishira; Tengku Nur Muzafirah	Bocce - Unified Sports Team	Division M01	19 June
Silver	Nur Syakila Binti Mohd Nasir; Mohd Safri Ramis	Badminton - Mixed Doubles	Division MXD07	21 June
Silver	Wafi Anas Mohd Kharul Anuar; Raevankumar Selvakumaran	Bocce - Unified Sports Doubles	Division M04	24 June
Silver	Nur Syakila Binti Mohd Nasir	Badminton - Women's Singles	Division WS_1A	24 June
Silver	Mohd Safri Ramis	Badminton - Men's Singles	Division MS_6A	24 June
Bronze	Wafi Anas Mohd Kharul Anuar	Bocce - Men's Singles	Division M14	21 June
Bronze	Beverly Chin; Sher Li Lee	Bowling - Women's Unified Sports Doubles	Division D26	22 June
Bronze	Zul Adly Majeni; Myron Hock Ming Khoo	Bowling - Men's Unified Sports Doubles	Division D32	22 June
Bronze	Nurul Shahfinaz Aishira	Bocce - Women's Singles	Division F09	22 June
Bronze	Nur Syakila Binti Mohd Nasir; Nur Aiyda Zharifah Binti Zalid	Badminton - Women's Unified Sports Doubles	Division WUD03	22 June
Bronze	Mohd Safri Ramis; Ricco Arylizon	Badminton - Men's Unified Sports Doubles	Division MUD06	22 June
Bronze	Agnes Tiong	Table Tennis - Women's Singles	Under-17 D2	23 June
Bronze	Zul Adly Majeni	Bowling - Men's Singles	Division D63	24 June
Bronze	Agnes Tiong; Edwin Peng	Table Tennis - Mixed Doubles	MD30+ 02	24 June

=== Medals by sport ===
Sport	Gold	Silver	Bronze	Total
Bowling	2	0	3	5
Bocce	1	2	2	5
Athletics	1	0	0	1
Badminton	0	3	2	5
Table Tennis	0	0	2	2

=== Medals by gender ===
Gender	Gold	Silver	Bronze	Total
Men	0	2	4	6
Women	3	1	4	8
Mixed	1	2	1	4

=== Multiple medalists ===
Name	Sport	1st place, gold medalist(s)	2nd place, silver medalist(s)	3rd place, bronze medalist(s)	Total
Nurul Shahfinaz Aishira	Bocce	1	1	1	3
Tengku Nur Muzafirah	Bocce	1	1	0	2
Beverly Chin	Bowling	1	0	1	2
Mohd Safri Ramis	Badminton	0	2	1	3
Nur Syakila Binti Mohd Nasir	Badminton	0	2	1	3
Wafi Anas Mohd Kharul Anuar	Bocce	0	2	1	3
Raevankumar Selvakumaran	Bocce	0	2	0	2
Zul Adly Majeni	Bowling	0	0	2	2
Agnes Tiong	Table Tennis	0	0	2	2

== Athletics ==
=== Track & road events ===
Athlete	Event	Category	Quarterfinal		Semifinal		Final	
Athlete	Event	Category	Result	Rank	Result	Rank	Result	Rank
Nur Ameer Muqsiq Bin Baharuddin	Men's 100m	Level A	13.40	4	13.13	4	13.30	5
Clement Kit Meng Ooi	Men's 200m	Level C	31.13	1	31.09	1	DQ	–
Joanna Cherlyn Julius	Women's 100m	Level B	21.47	6	20.39	4	20.86	4
Clement Kit Meng Ooi; Joanna Cherlyn Julius; Nur Ameer Muqsiq Bin Baharuddin; Nur Asliza Binti Mohd Sapri	4 × 100 m Mixed Relay		—		DQ	–	Did not advance	

=== Field events ===
Athlete	Event	Category	Quarterfinal		Semifinal		Final	
Athlete	Event	Category	Result	Rank	Result	Rank	Result	Rank
Nur Ameer Muqsiq Baharuddin	Men's long Jump	Level C	3.00	3	3.76	1	3.48	6
Clement Kit Meng Ooi	Men's shot put	Level D	DQ	–	Did not advance			
Joanna Cherlyn Julius	Women's long Jump	Level C	1.44	6	1.79	3	1.58	5
Nur Asliza Binti Mohd Sapri	Women's shot put	Level C	6.01	1	5.88	1	6.08	1st place, gold medalist(s)
Nur Asliza Binti Mohd Sapri	Women's mini javelin	Level A	—		11.15	7	10.66	8

== Badminton ==
Athlete	Event	Category	Round-robin			
Athlete	Event	Category	Opposition Score	Opposition Score	Opposition Score	Rank
Mohd Safri Ramis	Men's singles	MS_6A	Christoph Leitner (GER); W 2–0	Mahmood Husain (BRN); W 2–0	Laszlo Topjanszki (HUN); L 1–2	2nd place, silver medalist(s)
Mohd Safri Ramis / Ricco Arylizon	Men's unified sport doubles	UMD-6	Mauricio Martinez / Thanya Gehrmann (PAR); L 1–2	K M Farddin Shom / Gourab Singha (BAN); L 0–2	Hans Skree / Stian Glenne (NOR); W 2–0	3rd place, bronze medalist(s)
Mohd Safri Ramis / Nur Syakila Binti Mohd Nasir	Mixed doubles	MXD07	Julian Rublack / Pia Welsch (GER); L 1–2	Yuka Takenaka / Shuhei Ikai (JPN); W 2–0	Laszlo Topjanszki / Julianna Dinok (HUN); W 2–1	2nd place, silver medalist(s)
Nur Syakila Binti Mohd Nasir	Women's singles	WS_1A	Abir Ait Edery (MAR); L 0–2	Shrouq Altabakhi (PLE); W 2–0	Mei Si Ip (MAC); W 2–0	2nd place, silver medalist(s)
Nur Syakila Binti Mohd Nasir / Nur Aiyda Zharifah Binti Zalid	Women's unified sport doubles	UWD-3	Nahin Khan / Faiza Nasir (PAK); L 0–2	Nozima Ibragimova / Khalimakhon Juraeva (UZB); L 0–2	Eleonora Akmatbekova / Ilitay Mambetalieva (KGZ); W 2–0	3rd place, bronze medalist(s)

== Bocce ==
Athlete	Event	Category	Competition Round				Gold / Bronze Medal Match	
Athlete	Event	Category	Opposition Score	Opposition Score	Opposition Score	Result	Opposition Score	Rank
Wafi Anas Mohd Kharul Anuar	Men's singles	M14	Birgir Orn Vidarsson (ISL); W 4–3	Seamus O'Sullivan (IRL); L 4–7	Frank Chikolopiko (MAW); L 3–10	Advanced to the bronze medal match	Seamus O'Sullivan (IRL); W 10–2	3rd place, bronze medalist(s)
Nurul Shahfinaz Aishira	Women's singles	F09	Melissa Dupigny (DMA); L 4–7	Leticia Mwanza (ZAM); L 4–5	Ivana Galova (CZE); W 10–1	Advanced to the bronze medal match	Ivana Galova (CZE); W 12–0	3rd place, bronze medalist(s)
Wafi Anas Mohd Kharul Anuar; Raevankumar Selvakumaran; Nurul Shahfinaz Aishira; Tengku Nur Muzafirah	Unified sports team	M01	Honduras (HON); W 15–4	Belize (BIZ); W 12–6	Paraguay (PAR); L 7–8	Advanced to the gold medal match	Paraguay (PAR); L 5–9	2nd place, silver medalist(s)

=== Unified doubles tournament ===
Athlete	Category	Competition Round					Gold / Bronze Medal Match	
Athlete	Category	Opposition Score	Opposition Score	Opposition Score	Opposition Score	Result	Opposition Score	Rank
Nurul Shahfinaz Aishira / Tengku Nur Muzafirah	M04	Tiwannie Laurie / Annaliese Pascascio (BIZ); W 11–1	Wafi Anas Mohd Kharul Anuar / Raevankumar Selvakumaran (MAS); L 7–10	Milagro Perez / Alejandra Mairena (HON); W 12–0	Reginaldo de Souza / Claudio da Silva (BRA); W 8–5	Advanced to the gold medal match	Wafi Anas Mohd Kharul Anuar / Raevankumar Selvakumaran (MAS); W 10–6	1st place, gold medalist(s)
Wafi Anas Mohd Kharul Anuar / Raevankumar Selvakumaran	M04	Nurul Shahfinaz Aishira / Tengku Nur Muzafirah (MAS); W 10–7	Reginaldo de Souza / Claudio da Silva (BRA); W 9–4	Milagro Perez / Alejandra Mairena (HON); L 2–10	Tiwannie Laurie / Annaliese Pascascio (BIZ); W 8–6	Advanced to the gold medal match	Nurul Shahfinaz Aishira / Tengku Nur Muzafirah (MAS); L 6–10	2nd place, silver medalist(s)

== Bowling ==
Athlete	Event	Category	Final	
Athlete	Event	Category	Result	Rank
Khairul Zaim Kamarulzaman	Men's singles	D59	430	5
Zul Adly Majeni	Men's singles	D63	483	3rd place, bronze medalist(s)
Khai Li Lee	Women's singles	D37	232	5
Beverly Chin	Women's singles	D43	407	1st place, gold medalist(s)
Khai Li Lee / Khairul Zaim Kamarulzaman	Mixed doubles	D11	681	1st place, gold medalist(s)
Beverly Chin / Sher Li Lee	Unified sports doubles	D26	715	3rd place, bronze medalist(s)
Zul Adly Majeni / Myron Hock Ming Khoo	Unified sports doubles	D32	900	3rd place, bronze medalist(s)
Khai Li Lee; Zul Adly Majeni; Khairul Zaim Kamarulzaman; Beverly Chin	Team	D02	1468	7

== Swimming ==
Athlete	Event	Quarterfinal		Semifinal		Final	
Athlete	Event	Time	Rank	Time	Rank	Time	Rank
Yong Jan Yeo	Men's 25m breaststroke - Level B	DNS		Did not advance			
Yong Jan Yeo	Men's 50m breaststroke - Level B	DNS		Did not advance			
Sheena Xin Ying Ung	Women's 100m backstroke - Level B	—		DQ		Did not advance	
Sheena Xin Ying Ung	Women's 100m freestyle - Level A	01:45.74	7	01:47.69	4	01:47.70	4

== Table Tennis ==
Athlete	Event	Category	Competition Round				Gold Medal / Bronze Medal / Placement Match	
Athlete	Event	Category	Opposition Score	Opposition Score	Opposition Score	Result	Opposition Score	Rank
Edwin Peng	Men's singles	MS+30-D2	Qi Zhang (CHN); L 0–3	Kersten Schneevoigt (GER); L 1–3	Pit Theis (LUX); W 3–2	Advanced to the 5th place play-off	Tummas Wilhelm (FRO); W 3–1	5
Agnes Tiong	Women's singles	MSU17-D2	—	Nisora Safarova (TJK); L 1–3	So Chun Tong (HKG); L 1–3	Advanced to the bronze medal match	Alina Diaconu (MDA); W 3–0	3rd place, bronze medalist(s)
Agnes Tiong / Edwin Peng	Mixed doubles	MD 30+ 02	—	Alex Rae / Jamie Cliffe (GBR); L 2–3	Hendrikus Sleeuw / Agnes Danna (MON); W 3–1	Advanced to the bronze medal match	Nazlumkhan Quwanishbaeva / Omirniyaz Nurniyazov (UZB); W 3–0	3rd place, bronze medalist(s)
