= Theodor Lewald =

German civil servant (1860–1947)

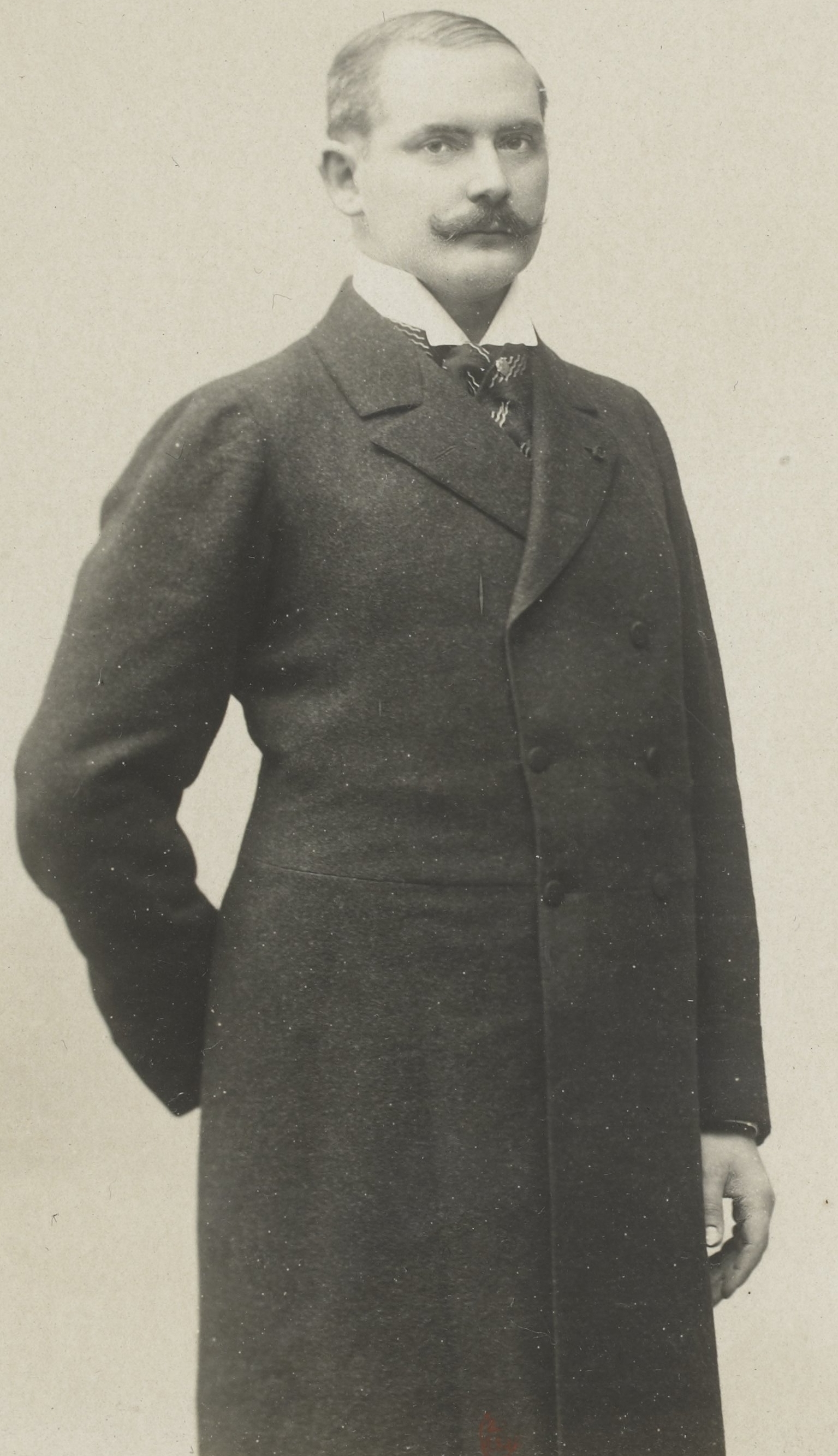
- Theodor Lewald in 1900
- Born: 18 August 1860; Berlin, German Confederation
- Died: 15 April 1947 (aged 86); Berlin, West Germany
- Years active: 1885–1938
- Known for: Executive of the International Olympic Committee; President of the Olympic organising committee for the 1936 Summer Olympics

Theodor Lewald (18 August 1860 – 15 April 1947) was a civil servant in the German Reich and an executive of the International Olympic Committee. He was the President of the Olympic organising committee for the 1936 Summer Olympics in Berlin.

== Early life ==
Lewald was born in 1860. His aunt was Jewish novelist Fanny Lewald. Lewald became a civil servant in Prussia in 1885, and became the acting Reich Commissioner in 1903. In that role, Lewald attended the 1904 World's Fair (held along with the Olympic Games), where he disagreed with Kaiser Wilhelm II over whether the Deutscher Olympischer Sportbund, of which he was the President, should be politically independent. After Berlin won the right to stage the 1916 Summer Olympics (which were later cancelled due to the outbreak of World War I), Lewald encouraged the German Reich to invest in the games, arguing that it was comparable to a World Trade Exhibition. By the end of World War I, Lewald was so well connected as the highest civil servant of Imperial Germany that he personally wrote the abdication speech of the last imperial government. At the time of the Kapp Putsch, Lewald was the acting Head of Government as all ministers had left Berlin. He refused being forced at gun-point to provide government funds for elements in the military in revolt. Lewald, a conservative, was getting into more and more difficulties with the Social Democratic governments and eventually retired from the Civil Service in 1923. However, he retained more than ten honorary positions, e.g. in charge of German international student exchange, serving on the boards of several prominent museums and the National Olympic Committee; he had been the under Secretary of State. In 1935, Lewald recommended that Pierre de Coubertin be awarded a Nobel Prize.

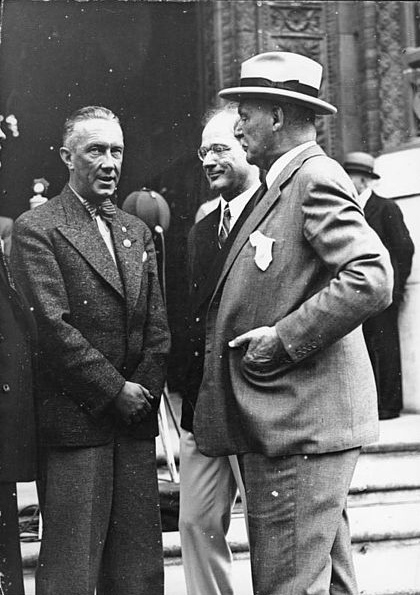
Lewald with Julius Lippert and Avery Brundage at the 1936 Summer Olympics

== 1936 Olympics ==
Lewald became a member of the International Olympic Committee in 1926, and was one of three Germans on the Committee that awarded Berlin the 1936 Summer Olympics. Lewald had previously argued for Germany to be allowed to attend the 1928 Summer Olympics, after being banned in 1920 and 1924. In November 1932, Lewald gained permission to create an independent Organising Committee for the Games, which was created in January 1933. Immediately after the Nazis won the 1933 federal election, he spoke to Joseph Goebbels about the propaganda value of the event.

Lewald was later removed from his post and replaced by Hans von Tschammer und Osten as Lewald's paternal grandmother was Jewish, although Lewald himself was a Christian. The IOC unsuccessfully demanded his reinstallation to the role at a meeting of June 1933. Instead, Lewald was given a ceremonial advisory role. He gave a formal speech at the opening of the 1936 Summer Olympics, although he also protested the treatment of German Jews during the Games. Lewald had previously assured the IOC that German Jews would not be excluded from the Games. The Olympiastadion in Berlin that was built for the Games contained an Olympic bell, which Lewald had suggested, and Lewald also suggested one of the designs for the Olympic torch, as well as getting the IOC to approve the torch route from Olympia to Berlin. After the Games, Sigfrid Edström nominated Lewald to be vice-president of the IOC, although Lewald withdrew and resigned his IOC role in 1938 after pressure to do so from the Nazi Party.
