= Haus des Deutschen Sports =

Sporting venue in Berlin, Germany

Coordinates: 52.5208°N 13.2421°E

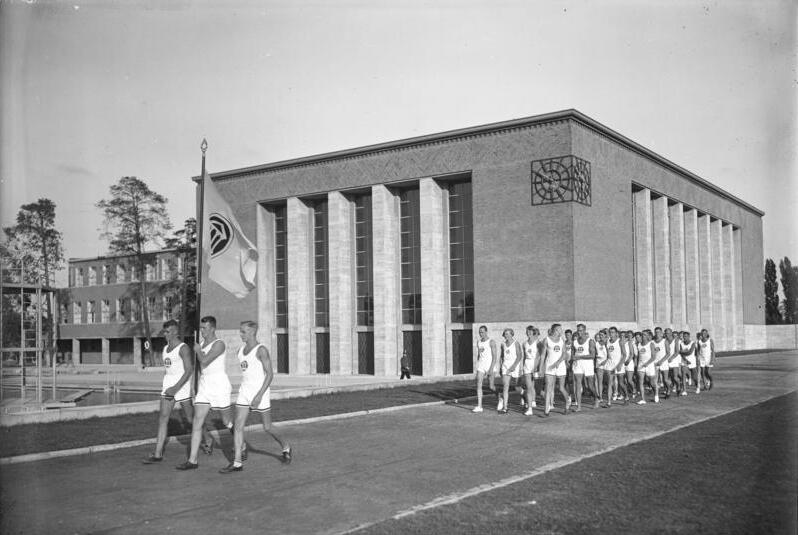
Deutsches Sportforum, Berlin-Grunewald

The Haus des Deutschen Sports (German: House of German sports), part of the larger Deutsches Sportforum, is a sporting venue constructed for the 1936 Summer Olympics in Berlin, Germany. Located in Olympiapark Berlin to the northeast of the Olympic Stadium, it hosted the fencing events and the fencing part of the modern pentathlon event.
