= Olympic Bell =

Bell cast for the London 2012 Olympics

Coordinates: 51.540388°N 0.016376°W

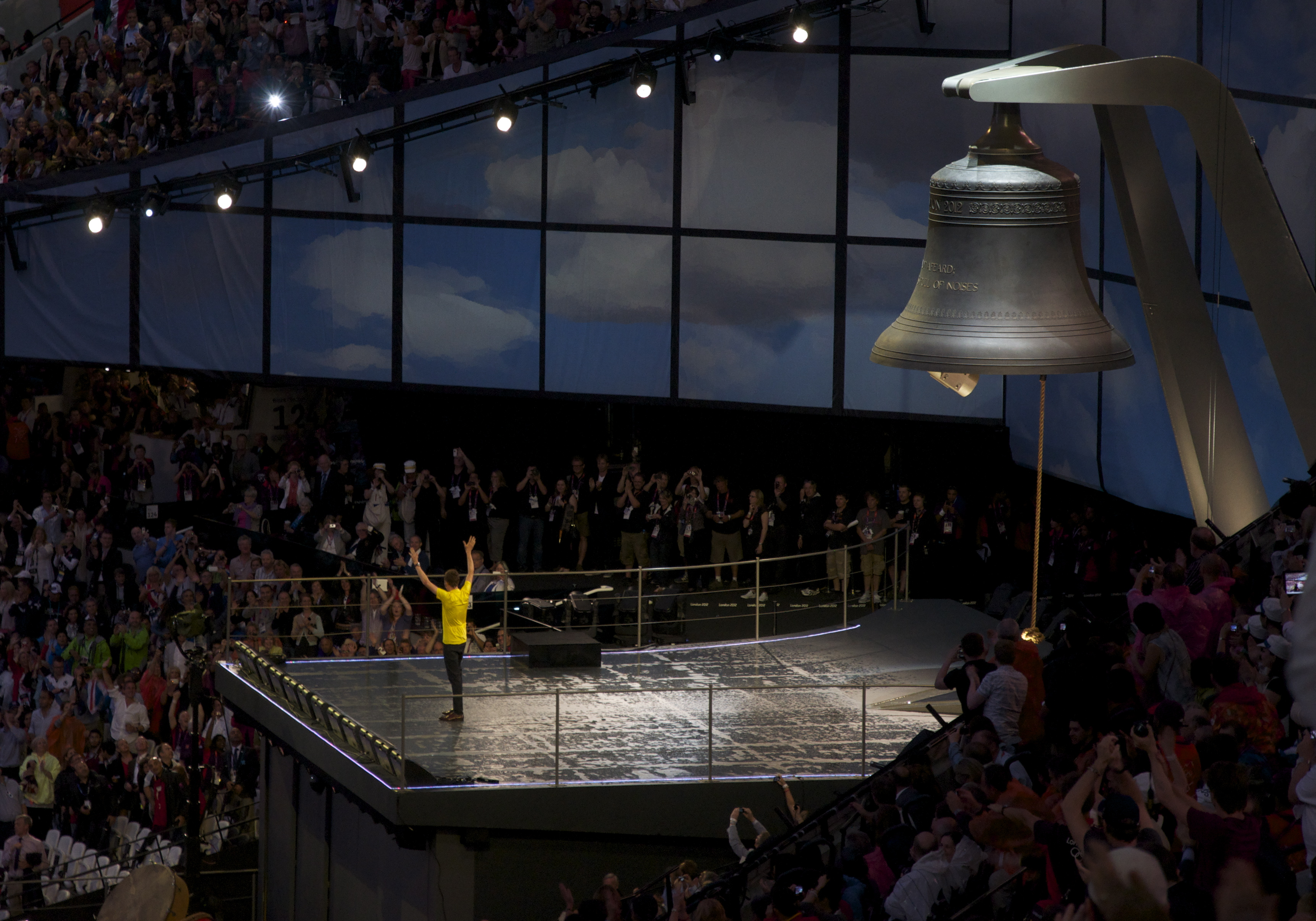
Bradley Wiggins began the 2012 opening ceremony by ringing the Olympic Bell.

The Olympic Bell was commissioned and cast for the 2012 London Olympic Games, and is the largest harmonically tuned bell in the world. Cast in bronze bell metal, it is 2 metres (6 ft 7 in) high with a diameter of 3.34 metres (10 ft 11 in), and weighs 22 long tons 18 cwt 3 qr 13 lb (51,393 lb or 23.311 t). The bell is now displayed in the Olympic Park.

== Making the bell ==
"Bells ring out the changes of our days. They call us to wake, to pray, to work, to arms, to feast and, in times of crisis, to come together. Almost everyone in Britain lives within a sonic parish. Anyone born within hearing of the Bells of St Mary-le-Bow in Cheapside, London, has the right to call themselves 'cockney' ... Above all, bells are the sound of freedom and peace. Throughout World War II all of Britain's bell towers were stilled, to be rung only in case of emergency. They hung in dusty silence until the day came when they could ring in the peace."

— Opening ceremony programme, page 13.

In September 2011 the Whitechapel Bell Foundry, a few miles from the London Stadium (which hosted the track and field elements of the games, as well as the Olympic Opening Ceremony), was commissioned to make the bell. The Foundry completed its design, profile, lettering and tuning. However, it was no longer able to cast such a large bell (its furnace capacity is 8 long tons (8.1 tonnes), as the large Victorian era bells had gone out of fashion), and so subcontracted casting to Royal Eijsbouts of the Netherlands. There was some controversy over using a non-British firm, as Taylor's Bell Foundry in Loughborough had also tendered to cast the bell. The hammer mechanism and hanging framework were made by other firms and twenty companies in three countries were eventually involved with its production. The bell was installed and tested in the stadium at midnight on 1 June 2012. It was designed to be as large as possible but needed to fit through the athletes’ tunnel; when it arrived there were only a few inches to spare.

The bell is the third heaviest in Europe, after the great bell in the National Cathedral of Romania and Petersglocke in Cologne Cathedral, and the largest harmonically tuned bell in the world. Its main note (in campanology, its 'hum tone') is B.

The bell is inscribed with "London 2012" and a line from Caliban's speech in The Tempest: "Be not afeard, the isle is full of noises", which featured in the Olympics opening ceremony spoken by Kenneth Branagh. The other side bears the legend "Whitechapel" and the Foundry's coat of arms.

== Ringing the bell ==
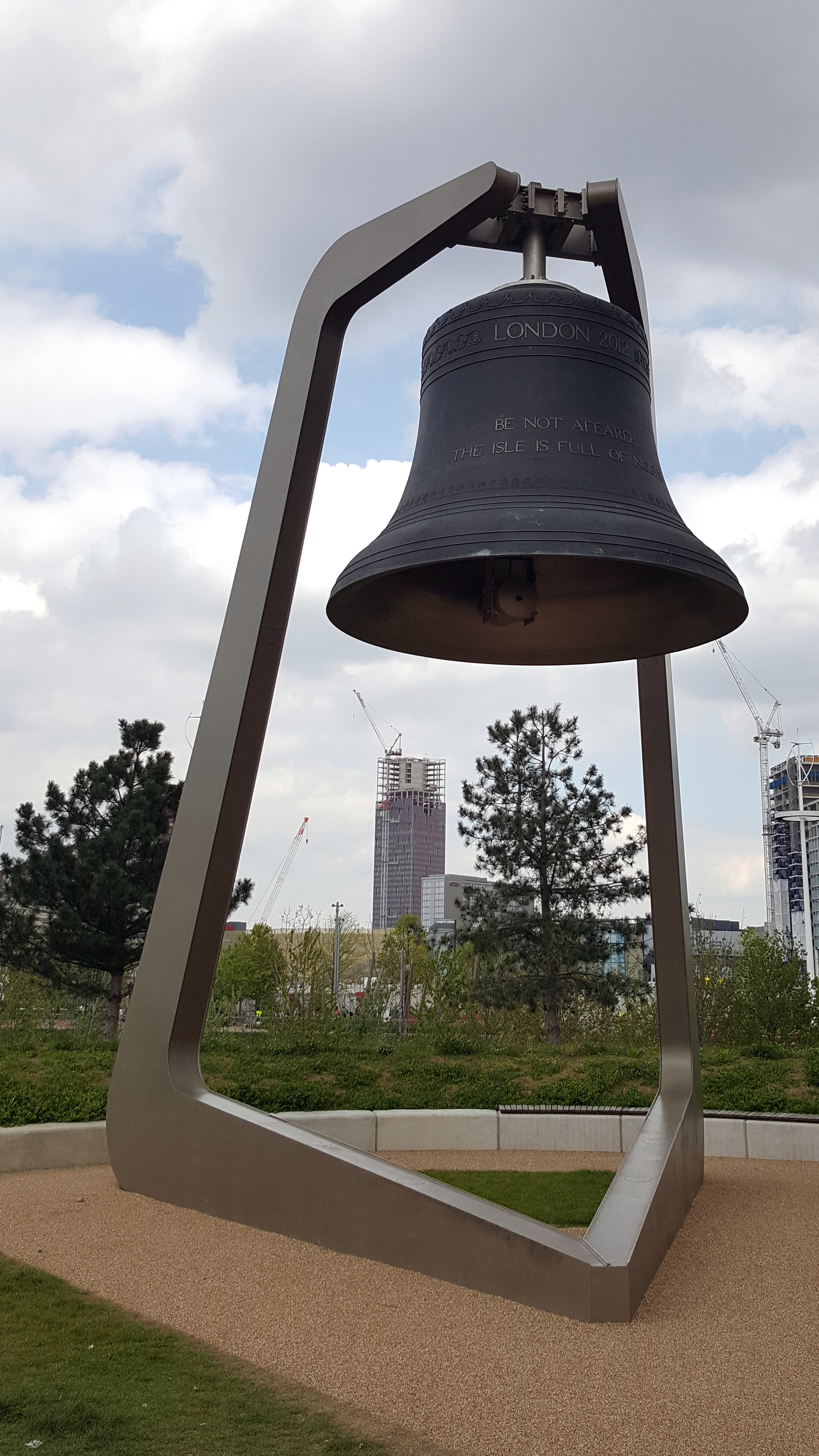
The bell in its current location, at the London Stadium, in Queen Elizabeth Olympic Park.

Bradley Wiggins, who had won the Tour de France five days earlier, opened the ceremony by 'ringing' the bell. This was symbolic as the hammer was actually moved mechanically: one journalist noted "He may be a superhuman athlete but even Bradley Wiggins isn’t capable of setting the Olympic Bell’s monumental half-ton clapper in motion by hand!" The bell was also rung later in the ceremony, including just before Paul McCartney's performance of "Hey Jude". McCartney blamed his faltering start on the unexpected loud sound of the bell, as he had forgotten it was going to be rung.

The bell also featured in music within the ceremony, such as in "And I Will Kiss". The bell was recorded at night, in the rain during rehearsals; sound engineers had to ask for work to stop for half an hour to successfully record it.

The bell hung in the Olympic Stadium for the opening ceremony. It was then moved to make way for the Olympic cauldron, and stored in the Olympic Park. The Olympic Park re-opened in July 2013, and in May 2016 the bell was returned and reinstalled on a supporting structure just outside the Olympic Stadium. The Olympic opening ceremony programme pledged that after 200 years the bell would return to the Whitechapel Bell Foundry for retuning, but the foundry closed in 2017.

The bell is not currently rung due to concerns that doing so would disturb nearby residents, making it possibly the largest ornamental bell in the world.

== See also ==
- Olympic Bell for the 1936 Berlin Summer Olympics
