= Maifeld (Berlin) =

Venue in Berlin, Germany

Coordinates: 52.5141°N 13.2344°E

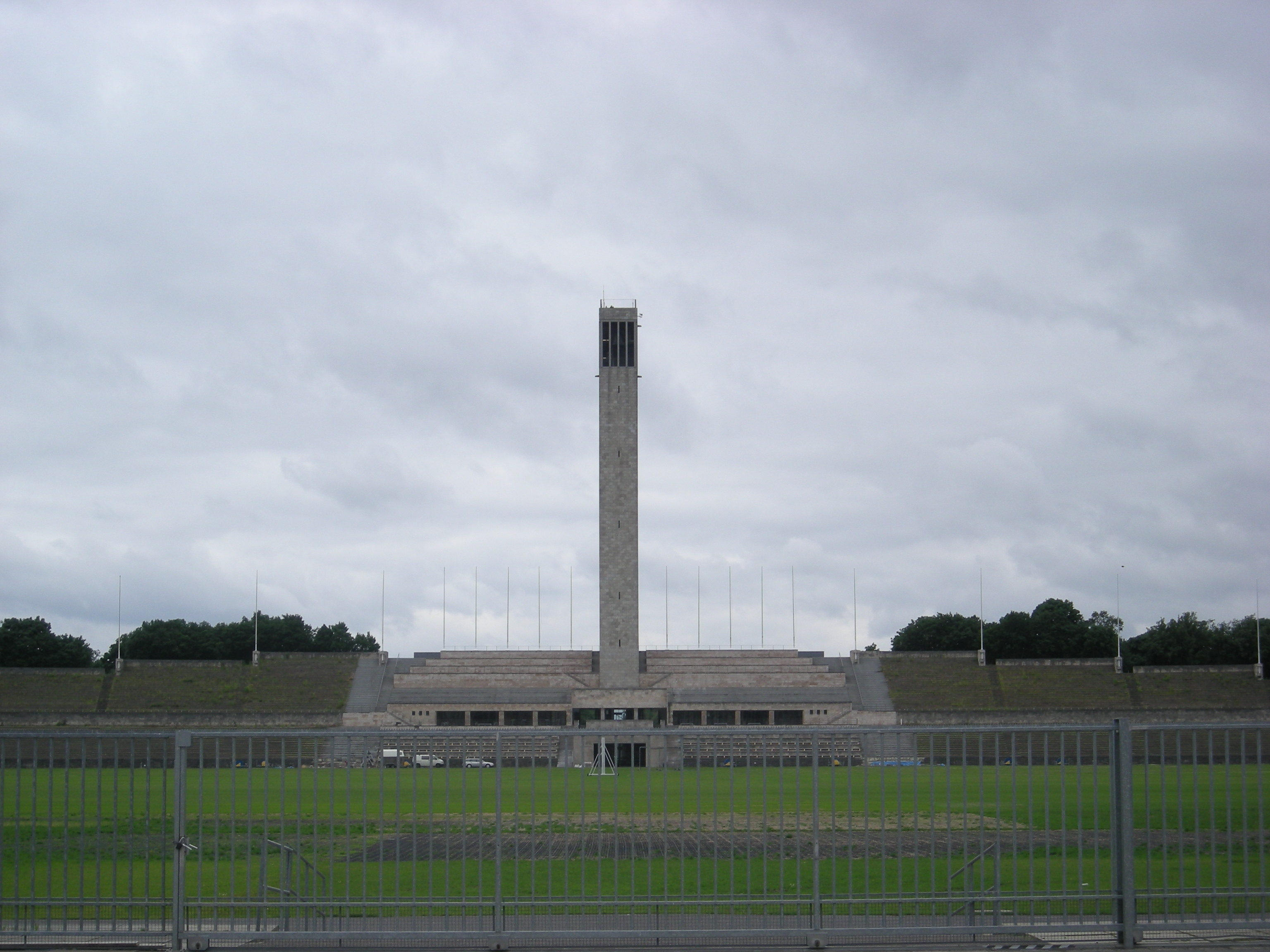
Maifeld in 2012

The Maifeld (German pronunciation: [ˈmaɪfɛlt]; German: Mayfield) is a venue in the Olympiapark Berlin. It was created as a huge lawn (112,000 square metres, 28 acres) for gymnastic demonstrations, specifically annual May Day celebrations by Hitler's government. The open field's dimensions were 290 meters by 375 meters. The total capacity was 250,000 on its for rallies and 44,000 in the large stands on its west end. The Maifeld was designed by Werner March. During the 1936 Olympics, the Maifeld was used for the Polo competition and equestrian dressage events. During the games the stands at the Bell Tower 4,500 seats, and accommodated 44,000 standees. Stands on the two sides perpendicular to the Bell Tower stands each provided standing room for 14,000 spectators. This allowed 75,000 spectators can be accommodated during the Olympics. The Bell Tower was built with a searchlight that provided lighting for the Mayfield, and an observation platform that could be reached via an electric lift. After World War II the British military occupation forces (Berlin Infantry Brigade) annually celebrated The Queen's Official Birthday on the Maifeld and used it for a variety of sporting activities including cricket. Starting in 2012, Maifeld became home to the cricket clubs of Berlin who had previously used the nearby Körnerplatz. In more recent years the Maifeld has also hosted many concerts.

== Langemark-Halle ==
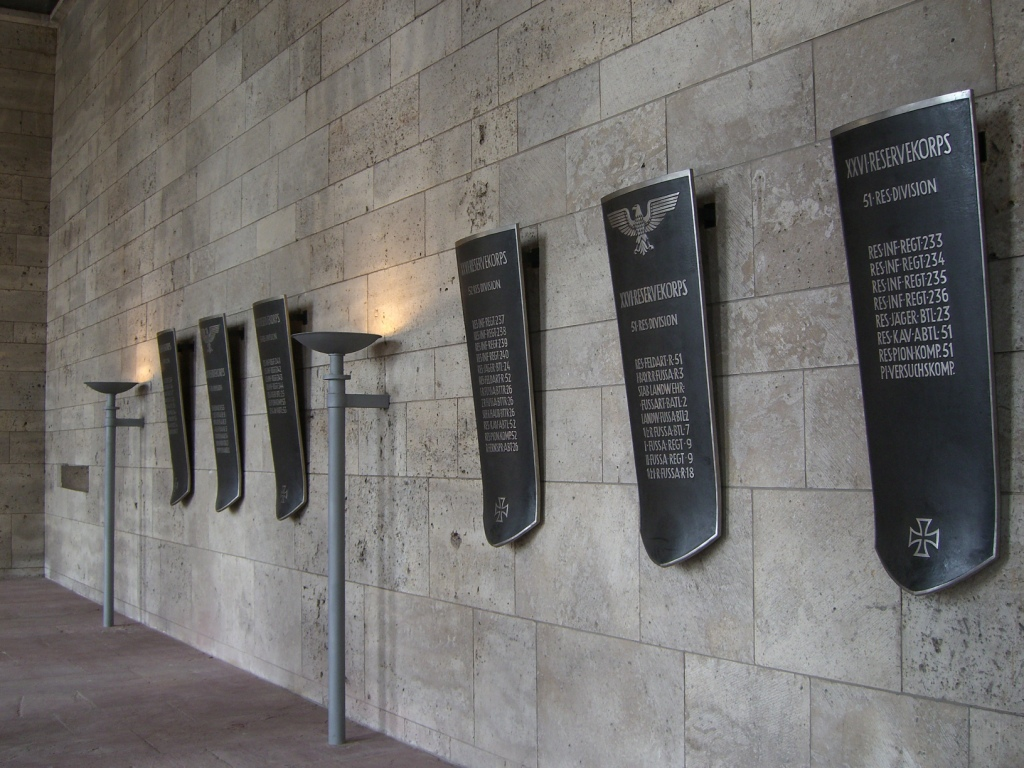

At the center of the bell tower stands was the Langemark-Halle, the eastern entrance of which provided access to the middle platform of the stands which allowed one a view of the entire Reich Sport Field. The Langemarck-Halle was a neo-classical building with a large podium atop it. Langemark-Halle was built beneath the Maifeld's stands, and served as a memorial to the forces that fought in Langemark. This consisted of huge halls built under the stands of the Maifeld. Pillars were raised on which hung flags and shields commemorating all the forces that participated in a battle fought in Langemark November 10, 1914, during the World War I. Since 2006, the ground floor of this structure is home to an exhibit about the area of the former Reichssportfeld.
