= Bell Tower of Berlin Olympic Stadium =

Observation tower in Berlin, Germany

Coordinates: 52°30′50″N 13°13′54″E

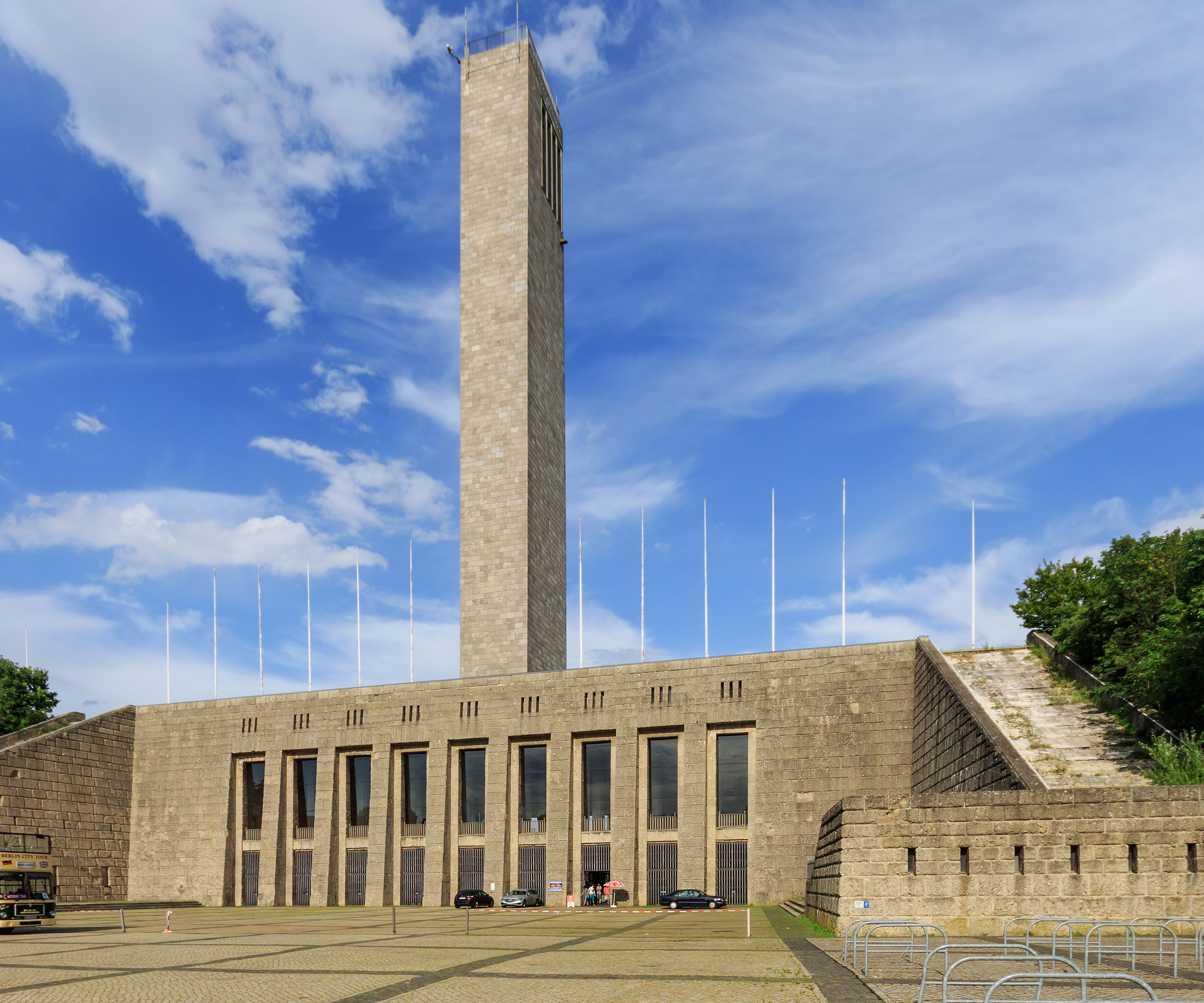
Bell tower exterior view

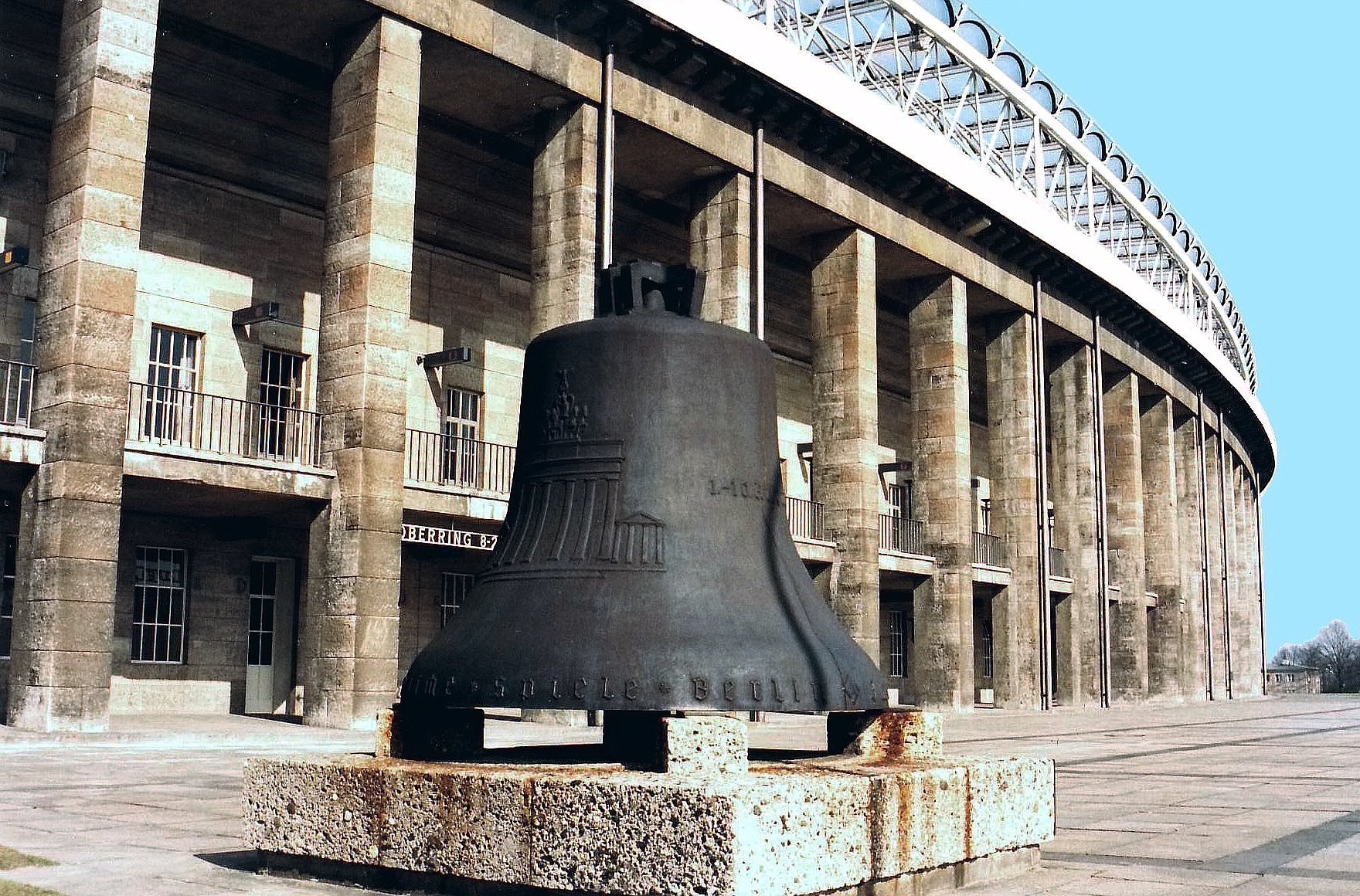
The original bell, pictured in 1993

The Bell Tower of Berlin Olympic Stadium is a 77-metre-high (253 ft) observation tower that was built in 1934 after plans by Werner March. The steel skeleton construction was faced with dressed limestone. The tower is located at the western end of the Olympiastadion.

After the Second World War, Soviet troops accidentally set the tower's contents on fire and it was no longer stable. Therefore, the British engineers blew it up in 1947. The Olympic Bell – weighing 9.60 tons, which had survived the fire and remained in its place in the tower – fell 77 metres (253 ft), cracked and has been unable to sound since then. In 1956 the bell was rescued, only in order to be used as a practice target using anti-tank ammunition. The old bell survives to this day and serves now as a memorial.

Between 1960 and 1962 the tower was rebuilt following the old plans, although the tower is now 77.17 metres (253.2 ft) high. In it hangs the present Olympic Bell weighing 4.50 tons with the German Federal Eagle, the Brandenburg Gate and the texts between the Olympic rings (in German language): "Olympic Games 1936" and "I call the youth of the world". The bell rings the note F sharp.

The tower is an important tourist destination offering a panorama of Berlin, Spandau, the Havel Valley, Potsdam, Nauen and Hennigsdorf.

== See also ==
- List of towers
