= Guido von Mengden =

- Born: 1896; Düren
- Died: 1982 (aged 85–86)
- Occupation: Sports Officer
- Known for: Key figure in the Nationalsozialistischer Reichsbund für Leibesübungen

Flag of the DRL/NSRL. Von Mengden was one of the main persons behind the organization.

Guido von Mengden (1896–1982) was a German Sports officer. He was a key figure in the Nationalsozialistischer Reichsbund für Leibesübungen (NSRL), the Sports Office of the Third Reich.

His role as a Nazi is the subject of controversy. Historian Hajo Bernett blames him for being one of the main culprits regarding the politization (i.e. Nazification) of German sports during the Third Reich.

Others believe though that thanks to him some valuable German sports associations were preserved. Guido von Mengden has been praised as the "spiritual father" of many post-war sports programs and German sports leader Carl Diem has mentioned him as "one of the most significant Sports leaders in Europe" for his work after 1950.

== Biographical data ==
Guido von Mengden was born in the town of Düren in the Prussian Rhine Province in 1896. His family hailed from the ancient Westphalian nobility. He played football (soccer) as a teenager in the Bonner FV team. in 1914 he passed his Reifeprüfung final exams in Bonn and went to World War I as a volunteer. He was discharged from the German Imperial Army after being badly wounded in June 1916 at Verdun and went on to study geodesy at the University of Bonn. He found employment as a land surveyor from 1919 until 1924, when he changed profession and became a journalist. He became an editor of the Art and sports sections of the Rheydter Tageblatt. In 1925 he moved to the Westdeutscher Spielverband as manager, becoming also the chief editor of its social organ Fußball und Leichtathletik. He had a role in the 1928 1928 Summer Olympics in Amsterdam as a press delegate.

In May 1933 Guido von Mengden became a member of the German Nazi Party. He went to Berlin in June 1933 as a press attaché of the German Football Association. From 1935 he was the public relations officer of the NSRL, the Reich Sports Office. He became the personal advisor and consultant of Reichssportführer Hans von Tschammer und Osten in 1936, and subsequently became the chief editor of NS-Sport, the official organ of the Reich Sports Office.

Towards the last days of World War II, von Mengden became a member of the Volkssturm National Militia. After being captured by the Soviet Army, he was employed by the Russians as surveyor in their Land reform projects in what was then East Germany. In 1948 he moved to West Germany and by March 1949 was ranked by the local denazification panel in Krefeld on the lowest Nazi category as a fellow traveler. He started out as Manager of the then very successful CSV Marathon 1910 Sports Club.

In 1951 von Mengden became the manager of the German Olympic Society (Deutsche Olympische Gesellschaft) and from 1954 to 1963 he rose to general manager of the German Sports Association (Deutscher Sportbund). After retiring he kept being active in the sports association as technical advisor.″

Von Mengden became a highly respected personality in German sports as an old man. He was the main writer of the standard work about the 1964 Winter Olympics in Innsbruck and the 1964 Summer Olympics in Tokyo. His last significant role was as advisor for the 1972 Summer Olympics in Munich.

== Published works ==
- Von Mengden, Guido, Umgang mit der Geschichte und mit Menschen, Verlag Bartels & Wernitz.

== See also ==
- Nationalsozialistischer Reichsbund für Leibesübungen

== Sources ==
- Havemann, Nils (2006) Fußball unterm Hakenkreuz. Der DFB zwischen Sport, Politik und Kommerz Bonn: Bundeszentrale für politische Bildung.
- Fischer, Gerhard & Lindner, Ulrich (1999). Stürmer für Hitler. Vom Zusammenspiel zwischen Fußball und Nationalsozialismus. Göttingen.
