= German Combat Games =

- Status: cancelled
- Genre: sports event
- Date: varying
- Frequency: every fourth year
- Country: Germany
- Years active: 1922–1937
- Organiser: Deutscher Reichsausschuss für Leibesübungen

The German Combat Games (German: Deutsche Kampfspiele) were a national multi-sport event established in 1922 by the Deutscher Reichsausschuss für Leibesübungen under Carl Diem.

== Deutsche Kampfspiele ==
The events lasted from 1922 to 1934. According to Diem the games should promote "German art, German song and German Volksgemeinschaft". In 1938 they were replaced by the Deutsches Turn- und Sportfest 1938.

A documentary film was made of the 1922 games, Die deutschen Kampfspiele 1922, produced by Arnold Fanck. A two-part documentary Zweite Deutsche Kampfspiele. 1. Tag and Zweite Deutsche Kampfspiele. 2. Tag was produced for the second edition of the games.

== NS-Kampspiele ==
During the Nazi regime, the fighting games continued as NS-fighting games. Since Germany had been allowed to participate in the Olympics since 1928, these games were no longer to be understood as a counter-movement to the Olympic idea, but rather as a propaganda platform for the regime. When, in 1935, the international boycott movement against the Olympic Games in Berlin in 1936 grew markedly, the replacement of German combat games in Berlin was Plan B of the Reichssportführer. On the order of Adolf Hitler on November 30, 1936, these games were held during the Reichsparteitage in Nuremberg from 1937 to 1938, with regional preliminary decisions for the main games. In addition to the NSDAP, the SA, SS, NSKK and HJ also participated in the predominantly military sports competitions, such as hand grenade targets, 30-meter swimming in a drizzle suit with a pack or 15-kilometer baggage in closed formations Wehrmacht and the police. The SA had the responsibility for these paramilitary events. The outbreak of war in 1939 ended the short episode of the NS combat games. A documentary was made of the 1937 edition of these games.

== Games ==
=== Summer Games ===
- 1922 - June 18 to July 2 in Berlin
- 1926 - July 4 to July 11 in Cologne
- 1930 - June 26 to June 29 in Breslau
- 1934 - June 23 to June 29 in Nürnberg

=== Winter Games ===
- 1922 - January 23 to January 29 in Garmisch-Partenkirchen in Upper Bavaria
- 1926 - January 23 to January 31 in Triberg im Schwarzwald
- 1930 - January 11 to January 19 in Krummhübel on Riesengebirge
- 1934 in Schierke in Harz

=== NS-Kampfspiele ===
- 1937 in Nürnberg
- 1938 in Nürnberg
