= 1936 Summer Olympics torch relay =

- Host city: Berlin, Germany
- Countries visited: Greece, Bulgaria, Yugoslavia (Serbia), Hungary, Austria, Czechoslovakia (Czechia), Germany
- Distance: 3,187 km
- Torchbearers: 3,331
- Start date: 20 July 1936
- End date: 1 August 1936
- Torch designer: Walter Lemcke
- No. of torches: 3,840

The 1936 Summer Olympics torch relay was the first of its kind, following on from the reintroduction of the Olympic Flame at the 1928 Games. It pioneered the modern convention of moving the flame via a relay system from Greece to the Olympic venue. Leni Riefenstahl filmed the relay for the award-winning but controversial 1938 film Olympia.

== Organization ==
The Olympic flame was introduced to the modern Games in 1928 when it burnt atop a pillar above the stadium in Amsterdam. Four years later the same was repeated in Los Angeles. At both of these events the flame was lit on site at the stadium.

Carl Diem used the idea of the torch relay devised for the 1936 Summer Olympics in Berlin by a Jewish archaeologist and sports official, Alfred Schiff. According to the official report for the Games, the torch relay was conceived as a publicity stunt to increase awareness for the Games. The process was ratified by the International Olympic Committee and has been repeated at all the Games that have followed.

Diem and the organizing team realized that there would need to be very detailed plans in order to successfully complete the relay to a standard that would satisfy both themselves and the ruling Third Reich. At the time they were unsure about exactly how they could use the sun's rays to start the fire as well as how to create a torch that would remain alight whatever the conditions. Research was therefore required into the specialist technologies that would be needed. The route itself would need development and the path down from Olympia was deemed too difficult to access. The organising committees therefore agreed that new roads would be built to ensure that the relay got off to the best possible start.

== Political significance ==
Siegfried Eifrig carrying the Olympic Flame at the end of the relay

Adolf Hitler saw the link with the ancient Games as the perfect way to illustrate his belief that classical Greece was an Aryan forerunner of the modern German Reich.

"The sportive, knightly battle awakens the best human characteristics. It doesn't separate, but unites the combatants in understanding and respect. It also helps to connect the countries in the spirit of peace. That's why the Olympic Flame should never die."

— Adolf Hitler, commenting on the 1936 Berlin Olympic Games

The event was designed to demonstrate the growing influence and power of the Third Reich. It was internationally viewed as a great success, sufficient for it to be replicated in all Games thereafter.

Leni Riefenstahl, a film-maker admired by Hitler, filmed the relay for the 1938 release Olympia. While the film is often seen as a prime example of Nazi propaganda, it has also been hailed as one of the greatest films of all time and won many awards upon its release.

== Relay elements ==
=== Torch ===
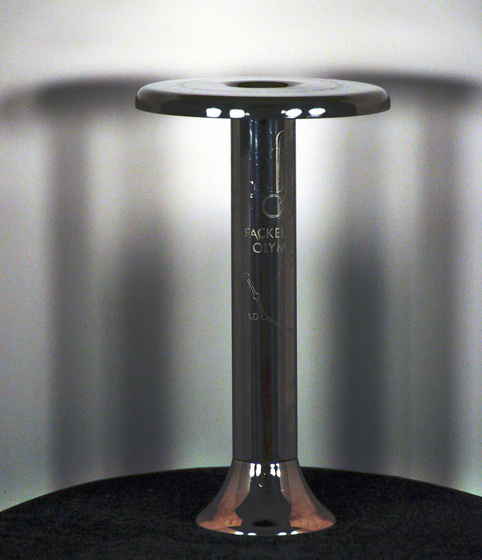
The Berlin Olympic Torch

Sculptor Walter Lemcke designed the 27 cm wood and metal torches. German manufacturer Krupp produced 3,840 copies for the runners, over 500 more than would be needed. It was designed with two fuses to help it cope with different weather conditions and could stay alight for ten minutes, longer than each section of the route.

=== Route ===
On 20 July 1936 the Olympic flame was lit in Greece by a concave mirror made by German company Zeiss. The Nazi Party wanted to demonstrate their organisational prowess and enhance their influence on various countries along the route of the relay. The torch travelled through south-eastern and central European countries to demonstrate and enhance their influence. The National Olympic Committees (NOCs) of the countries along the route all agreed to support the relay which would pass through Greece, Bulgaria, Yugoslavia, Hungary, Austria, and Czechoslovakia and then Germany. These countries would fall under Nazi domination as the second World War began just over three years later. In Austria, a country that would be annexed into the Third Reich less than two years after the relay, the torch was met by major pro-Nazi public demonstrations.

In all the torch was transported over 3,187 kilometres by 3,331 runners in twelve days and eleven nights from Greece to Berlin. Much of the route was split into kilometre-long sections and it was anticipated that each runner would traverse that distance in five minutes, though some leeway was given to allow for difficult terrain and sparsely populated areas. The names of most of the torch bearers, all of whom were male, were not recorded.

== Route in Greece ==
Locations	Map (larger dots indicate celebrations along route)
20 July: Olympia, Ladon, Vytina 21 July: Tripoli, Argos, Corinth, Eleusis, Athens 22 July: Thebes, Livadeia, Delphi, Amfissa, Bralos, Lamia 23 July: Domokos, Farsala, Larissa, Elassona, Servia, Kozani 24 July: Veria, Gidas, Philicos, Thessaloniki, Langadas, Serres 25 July: Sidirokastro	1936 Summer Olympics torch relay is located in Greece

== Route in Europe ==
Locations	Map (larger dots indicate celebrations along route)
Bulgaria; 25 July: Kula; Kresna; Gorna Dzumaja; Dupnitsa; Sofia; Slivnitsa	1936 Summer Olympics torch relay is located in Bulgaria
Yugoslavia; 26 July: Caribrod; Pirot; Niš; Ražanj; Pojate; Paraćin; Ćuprija; Jagodina; Kragujevac; 27 July: Topola; Oplenac; Mladenovac; Belgrade; Zemun; Inđija; Novi Sad; Stari Vrbas; Bačka Topola; 28 July: Subotica; Horgoš	1936 Summer Olympics torch relay is located in Serbia
Hungary; 28 July: Szeged; Kiskunfélegyháza; Kecskemét; Sári; Soroksár; Budapest; 29 July: Tát; Szőny; Győr; Moson; Oroszvár	1936 Summer Olympics torch relay is located in Hungary
Austria; 29 July: Kittsee; Hainburg; Markt; Vienna; Stockerau; 30 July: Maissau; Horn; Göpfrür; Waidhofen; Heidenreichstein; Reingers	1936 Summer Olympics torch relay is located in Austria
Czechoslovakia; 30 July: Nová Bystřice; Jindřichův Hradec; Soběslav; Tábor; Benešov; Prague; 31 July: Straškov; Terezín; Teplice; Petrovice	1936 Summer Olympics torch relay is located in Czech Republic

== Route in Germany ==
Locations	Map
31 July: Pirna; Dresden; Meissen; Großenhain	1936 Summer Olympics torch relay is located in Saxony
Elsterwerda; Liebenwerda; Herzberg; Jüterbog; Luckenwalde; Trebbin	1936 Summer Olympics torch relay is located in Brandenburg
1 August: Berlin; Lustgarten; Olympic Stadium	1936 Summer Olympics torch relay is located in Berlin

== Runners per country ==
#	Country	Runners
1	Greece	1,108
2	Bulgaria	238
3	Yugoslavia	575
4	Hungary	386
5	Austria	219
6	Czechoslovakia	282
7	Germany	267

=== Lighting of the cauldron ===
Two urns in the centre of Berlin, within two long rows of large swastika flags, were lit by 400m-runner Siegfried Eifrig on 1 August 1936. The urns burnt for the duration of the Games and served as the starting point for the final relay runner. Fritz Schilgen, a three time 1500m champion, was suggested by former German athletics president Karl Ritter von Halt as the final runner. Schilgen, viewed as a "symbol of German sporting youth", was accepted by the three advisory boards. One of these, the aesthetics commission, included film-maker Riefenstahl on the panel.
