= Breitmeyer =

Breitmeyer is a German surname. Notable people with the surname include:

- Arno Breitmeyer (1903–1944), German sports official
- Philip Breitmeyer (1864–1941), American florist

== See also ==
- Maggy Breittmayer (1888–1961), Swiss violinist
