= Carl Diem =

German sports administrator (1882–1962)

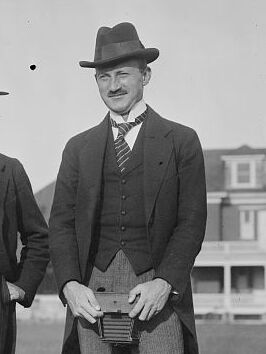
Diem in 1913 at Princeton University

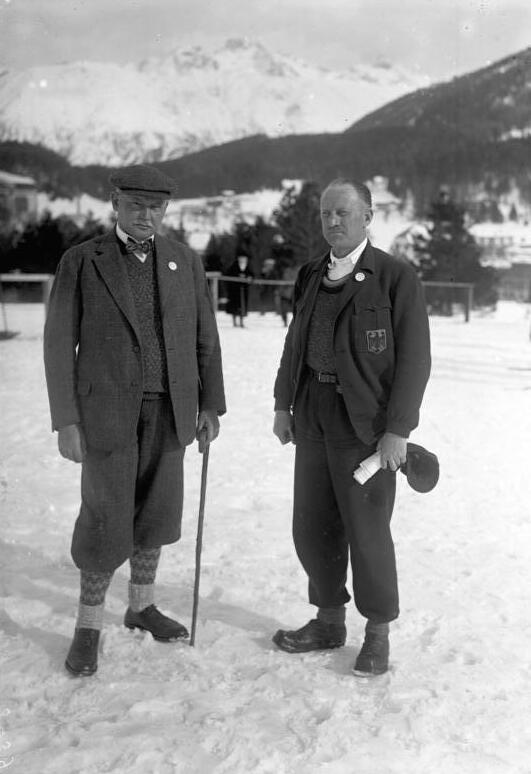
Lewald and Diem in St. Moritz, 1928

30 June 1936: Siegfried Eifrig carries the Olympic torch in Berlin, before it is carried into the Olympic stadium

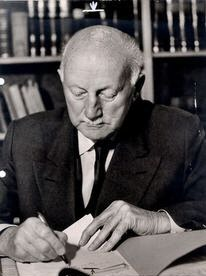
Carl Diem in the 1950s

Carl Diem (24 June 1882 – 17 December 1962) was a German sports administrator, and as a Secretary General of the Organizing Committee of the Berlin Olympic Games, he was also the chief organizer of the 1936 Olympic Summer Games.

He created the tradition of the Olympic torch relay when he organised the 1936 build-up event, and was an influential historian of sport, particularly the Olympic games.

== Biography ==
Born into an upper-middle-class family, Diem was a middle- and long-distance runner as a teenager – unusual in a country where gymnastic-style athletics was fashionable, rather than what were known as "Anglo-Saxon" athletics. He showed an early gift for organizing, founding his first athletic club, called Marcomannia, in 1899. As a young man, Diem originally pursued a career in sales, but also began to write articles for sporting newspapers. At the age of twenty, he was hired by the German Sports Authority for Athletics (the Deutsche Sportbehörde für Athletik, or DSBfA), and a year later was elected to its board of directors. Diem was an ardent believer in the heroic Olympian ideal, and in the contributions that international sport could foster harmony between nations. In this regard (and others) he was a fervent disciple of Pierre de Coubertin, the founder of the International Olympic Committee and father of the modern international Olympiad.

In 1906, Diem began his Olympic career, leading the German contingent of athletes to the Athens games (for reasons that are not entirely clear, the German delegation entered the stadium first in the parade of athletes). In 1909, the games for the summer of 1912 were awarded to Stockholm, but the IOC made it clear that Diem and his fellow organizers could expect to hold the 1916 games in Berlin. In 1912 he initiated the award of the German Sports Badge, following the example of a Swedish award encountered during the Stockholm Olympics.

Diem threw himself into preparations for the 1916 games. His principal partner in this and most of his Olympic endeavors was Theodor Lewald, who was for many years chairman of the German Olympic Committee. In the summer of 1914, Diem and Lewald were planning their spectacular 1916 Olympiad when World War I erupted, and the Berlin games were subsequently cancelled. Diem enlisted in the German army and served in Belgium and France. He was wounded at Saint-Quentin, recovered, and fought at both Champagne and the Argonne.

After the war, Olympic officials penalized Germany by excluding them from the 1920 and 1924 games. Diem and Lewald, who had returned to their sports-organizing duties, lobbied successfully to win permission for a German team to compete in the 1928 games in Amsterdam. With support from the state, Diem also founded the Deutsche Hochschule für Leibesübungen, a school dedicated to the study of the science of sport. He was a great admirer of American athletic programs, and in 1929 toured the US for five weeks with Lewald. During this trip he formed a friendship with Avery Brundage, an American Olympic official who would play a major role in the controversy over the 1936 Olympics (and in Olympic history for decades to come). In 1938, Diem was elected as a Corresponding Fellow in the prestigious American Academy of Physical Education (now known as the National Academy of Kinesiology). In 1955, his wife, Liselott Diem, was also elected into the Academy as a Corresponding Fellow.

== Olympics in Berlin ==
Carl Diem became the secretary of the all-German sports organization Deutscher Reichsausschuss für Leibesübungen (DRL), the forerunner of the Nationalsozialistischer Reichsbund für Leibesübungen (NSRL), the Sports Organ of the Third Reich.

In April 1931, again largely due to the reputation and lobbying efforts of Diem and Lewald, Berlin was selected to host the 1936 summer games, and Diem was named Secretary General of the Organizing Committee. He attended the 1932 games in Los Angeles, carefully observing the host city's preparations and facilities, committed to meeting or outdoing the American accomplishment in Berlin four years later.

Dr. Theodor Lewald, Diem's boss as President of the Olympic Committee and IOC Member, set up an Organizing Committee for the Olympic games, five days before the elections that resulted in Hitler being elected the new chancellor. The rise of Adolf Hitler to power in 1933 once again threatened Diem's dream of a Berlin Olympiad: Nazism did not embrace international sport, and Hitler himself had dismissed the Olympics as a project of "Jews and Freemasons."

Five days after the swearing-in of the new Ministers, Theodor Lewald had an appointment with Joseph Goebbels, the new Minister of Propaganda. Lewald, a former Under-secretary of state was well connected inside the whole administration and able to get an appointment. He convinced Goebbels that this was a once in a lifetime propaganda opportunity. Goebbels convinced Hitler, who informed Diem and Lewald that he would support the Games. Six months later, after touring the construction sites for the sporting arenas, he told Diem that the German state would pay the bills.

Instead of a balanced budget, which Diem had proposed in late 1932, new sporting facilities were built, the underground train extended to the stadium site. The amount of money provided by the government was about twenty times higher than the original budget. Diem used the opportunity to quadruple his own salary.

The Nazis embraced the Olympic Games not only because they promised to be a unique opportunity to extol the virtues of their "reborn" state; as a celebration of physical prowess, the games also dovetailed neatly with the Nazi idealization of youth, fitness and athleticism. Further, according to Nazi racial theories, their own Aryan "superiorities" were descended from the great achievements of ancient Greece.

Despite the official Nazi support for the games, Diem's position as organizer was at risk, mostly because his Hochschule employed Jewish teachers and because Diem's wife, Liselott, came from a Jewish family. He himself was classified, for these reasons, as a "white Jew", but even so, Diem managed to hold on to his job and solidify his position with his Nazi patrons. His boss Theodor Lewald, who had given up his post as President of the German Sports Body in 1933 before the Nazis could remove him, clung to the newly created position of President of the Organizing Committee. (Lewald's father was a prominent lawyer who was Jewish. Lewald had to arrange himself with Hans von Tschammer und Osten, the new President of the National Olympic Committee, but even more so with Interior Minister Wilhelm Frick (whose Ministry had been in charge of elite sport since 1914.)

American IOC Member Gen. Charles Sherrill had a one-hour interview with Hitler in which Sherrill not only asked Hitler for an autograph, but demanded the participation of at least one token Jew on the German teams for the Winter and Summer Games – or the Games would be cancelled. Hitler strongly rejected this "friendly" advice, shouting that if the worst came to the worst, the Olympic games would be staged for Germans only. The Nazi establishment went out of their way to assure the world that "non-Aryan" participants were being allowed to compete – and kept Jewish Olympic hopefuls in national training camps.

The American Olympic Association remained sceptical about the Nazis' openness to non-Aryan competitors, and a movement to boycott the Berlin games began to gather steam among U.S. Olympic officials. Diem's old friend Avery Brundage, president of the American Olympic Committee, was dispatched to appraise the facts; in Berlin, Diem convinced Brundage that Jews were not being excluded, though he likely knew otherwise. Brundage returned to the U.S. and, defeating the boycott's supporters, helped to ensure that a full American athletic delegation would attend the games in Berlin. With the first edition of the Nuremberg Laws (September 1935), excluding Jews from public life, "Half-Jews" (no more than two of the four grandparents racially of Jewish descent) were still permitted in public life but not in the civil service. This gave Lewald the opportunity to preside over the Opening Ceremony next to Hitler, allowed Rudi Ball to play hockey in the Winter games, and permitted Helene Mayer to fence (and win a silver medal) in the Summer Games. Jewish Germans were, however, excluded.

Diem held high posts in the Third Reich's sports organization even after the Olympics, becoming the leader of the Foreign Department of the National Socialist Sports Office (the aforementioned NSRL) in 1939. As such he was responsible for the management of German athletes in foreign countries, as well as for the international affairs of the NSRL. With his good relations with the IOC, Diem succeeded in having the 1940 Winter Olympics scheduled for Garmisch-Partenkirchen, despite the fact that the previous Winter Olympics had been held there, and that Germany had already invaded Czechoslovakia at the time the decision was made. The 1940 Winter Olympics were cancelled following Germany's invasion of Poland.

== Torch relay ==
There is a controversy as to who invented the Olympic torch relay. According to the "Official Report", a Mr Haeggert, administrator of the Propaganda Minister on the Propaganda Committee of the Summer Games, invented the propaganda stunt to raise public awareness in the last weeks prior to the games, and Diem was merely told to work out the details. On the other hand, Diem himself claimed that it was his idea all along. On a visit to Greece for an Olympic conference in 1934, Diem and Lewald imagined a new symbolic pageant that would cloak the German games with the ancient Greek mantle: the transit of a lit Olympic flame from Greece to Berlin by a relay of torch-bearing runners. While the relay is sometimes believed to be an ancient tradition, it was in fact the wholly modern creation of Lewald and Diem; the ancient games included a ritual flame commemorating the theft of fire from the gods by Prometheus, but not a torch relay. Diem had been organizing long-distance road relays ever since 1910.

On 30 June 1936, the first torch-flame was kindled in Olympia, Greece, in the ruins of the Temple of Hera, by 15 robed "virgins," using a concave mirror focusing the sun's rays, all under the supervision of a "high priestess." It was carried to the Acropolis in Athens for a special invocation, and then relayed along the 3,422-kilometer distance to the Olympic stadium in Berlin by an equal number of young Aryan-looking runners, each of whom took the flame a single kilometer.

On its way, the flame passed through Bulgaria, Yugoslavia, Hungary, Austria and Czechoslovakia; those countries, and Greece itself, would all be under Nazi domination within ten years. The event was filmed by Hitler's favorite director, Leni Riefenstahl, and branded with the giants of German industry: the lighting-mirrors were made by the Zeiss corporation, and the torches themselves, fueled with magnesium to prevent them from going out in bad weather, were constructed by Krupp, the huge steel and munitions conglomerate that armed Germany for both world wars.

The final leg of the relay was completed on 1 August by Fritz Schilgen, a German electrical engineer and national champion runner, who ran into the stadium and lit the Olympic cauldron to open the games. Schilgen was not actually competing; he was selected by officials, including Riefenstahl, for the grace and aesthetic appeal of his running style. Diem was in Hitler's party as the Fuehrer presided over the ceremony; when Hitler strode across the stadium to his official box, a five-year-old girl presented him with a bouquet of flowers. The child was Diem's daughter, Gudrun.

The tradition of a torch relay from Greece to the host country of the Olympic games has been continued at every Olympiad since then. Even the ritual kindling of the flame with a mirror on the grounds of the Temple of Hera remains virtually intact as the official method of starting the relay.

== Legacy ==
In March 1945, as the Red Army was closing in on Berlin in the final weeks of the Second World War, Diem staged another event in the city's Olympic stadium. Addressing a rally of thousands of teenage Hitler Youth, Diem exhorted them to defend the capital to the death, "in the spirit of the ancient Spartans". Some two thousand of the young men assembled there did exactly that, dying before Berlin finally fell in May.

After the conclusion of the war, Diem was quickly rehabilitated into the mainstream of the newly democratic Federal Republic of Germany. He was acting Director of the Berlin University Physical Education Department. When Bernhard Zimmermann, who had emigrated to Scotland in 1938, declined to become the Rector of a new National Sport College in the British Zone (Cologne), Diem received the job. He returned to his career as a historian of German sport and the Olympic games. In 1960, he published an authoritative general history of sport. At his death in 1962 in Cologne, he was once again a respected national figure. The Carl Diem Institute at the German Sports University was created in his honor, and run by his wife, Liselott, until 1989. After her death in 1992, the institute was renamed the Carl and Liselott Diem Archive. Diem remains the most influential historian of sports in Germany.

The full nature of Diem's relations with the Nazi apparatus is complex. His career in national sport preceded the Nazi regime by decades, and he was appointed to organize the 1936 games years before Hitler decided to put his own indelible mark on the Berlin competition. But like many career professionals who chose to accept Nazi patronage, Diem's legacy was irreversibly tarnished by proximity to his masters. His earlier writings did occasionally embrace popular ideas about racial superiority; he clung to his prominent national positions during the Nazi period, and he took part in war propaganda, including the Berlin rally near the war's end. Richard Mandell, author of the 1971 book The Nazi Olympics, was critical of Diem; in a reprint of the book, he defended his position, writing: "Recently, some careful German researchers have uncovered documents showing that Carl Diem's complicity with the Nazis went beyond his confessed use of them to promote sport. With his Nazi connections he settled brutally some old scores, and he stayed with the Nazis on ideological grounds long after their savagery was exposed and after their coming defeat was apparent to all." And yet even Mandell did not dispute that Diem was "the greatest sports historian and most profound theorist of sport education" of the 20th century.

During Diem's final years, there was open controversy about his Nazi connections. For example, in 1954 the French ministry of Education postponed a display of gymnastics before a delegation headed by Diem (then head of the Sportschule at Cologne), after students claimed that Diem had been a "Nazi general." Two days later, the students recanted, and admitted that there was no "formal proof" of the allegation. In the 1990s, a public debate erupted in Germany over his legacy, and whether streets named in his honor should be renamed because of the taint of the Nazi years. In 1948, when Diem attempted to become an IOC Member (Lewald had died in 1947), the IOC rejected him. By the IOC standards of the time he was not considered a "gentleman"; he had worked only for hire and never in an honorary function.

== See also ==
- Siegfried Eifrig
- Nationalsozialistischer Reichsbund für Leibesübungen
- Deutscher Olympischer Sportbund
