= Walter Lemcke =

German sculptor

Walter E. Lemcke
- Born: 19 August 1891
- Died: 1955
- Occupation: Sculptor
- Known for: Designed the first Olympic Torch

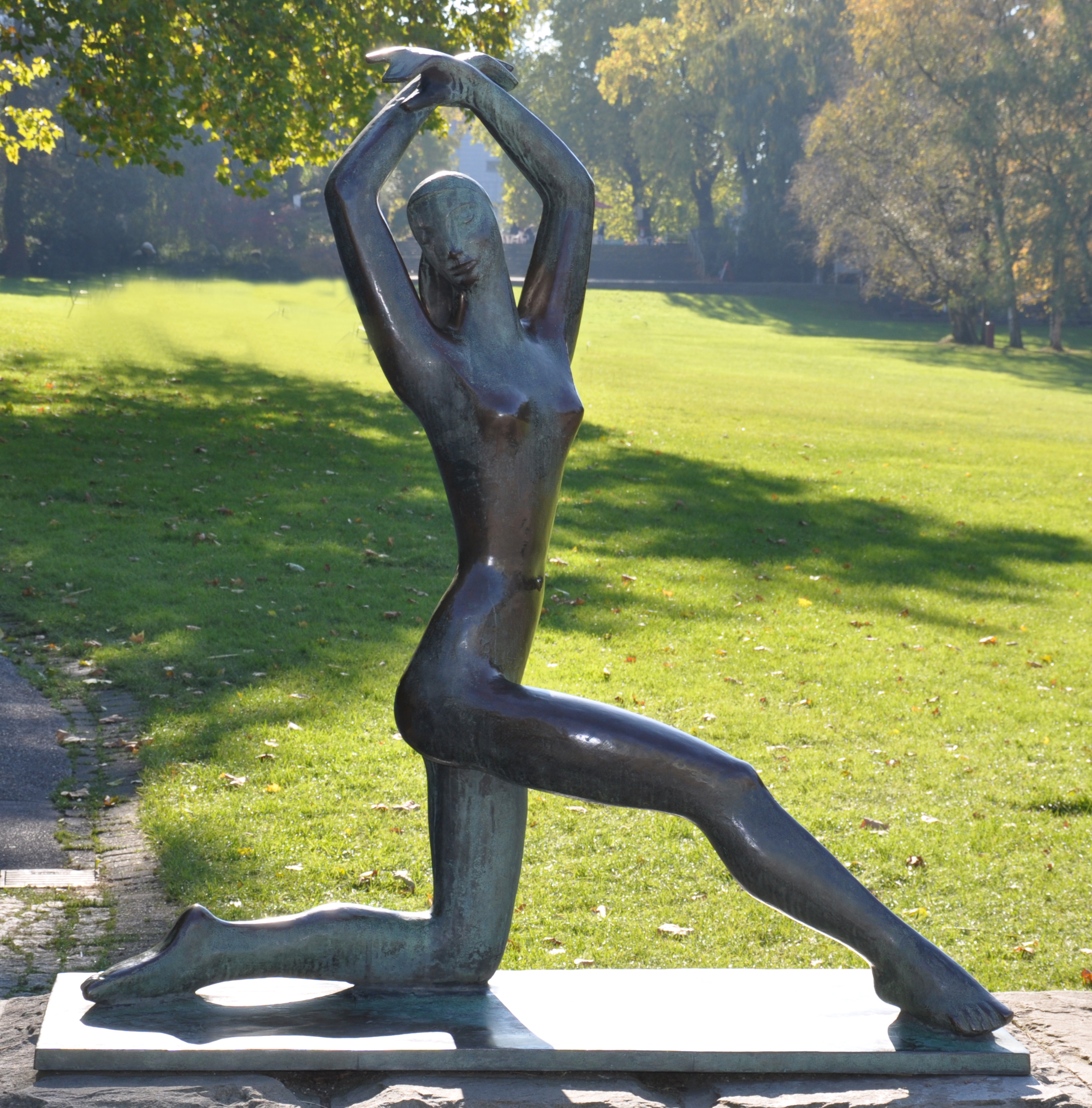
Tänzerin (Dancer) 1953, located in Grugapark, Essen

Walter E. Lemcke (19 August 1891 – 1955) was a German sculptor who mainly worked in bronze. He produced numerous sculptures for Nazi Germany, including the eagles holding swastikas that flanked the entrance of the Ministry of Aviation in Berlin. He is also remembered as being the designer of the first Olympic Torch, which carried the flame during the 1936 Summer Olympics torch relay.

Several of Lemcke's works remain today and are featured in parks and museums around Germany.

== Works ==
=== Nazi eagles ===
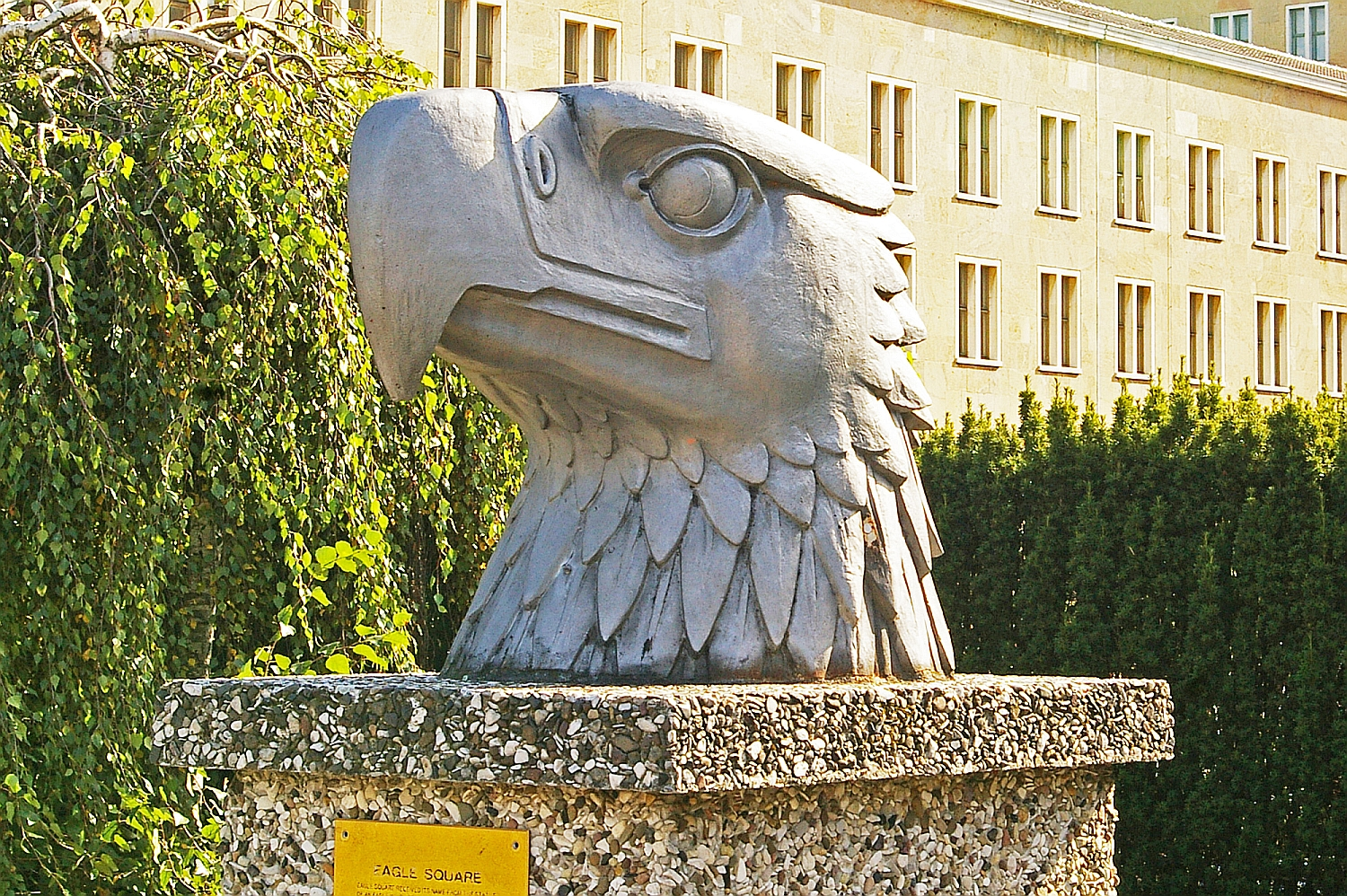
The head of Lemcke's 4.5 m eagle sculpture

Lemcke produced numerous pieces that depicted eagles, the national symbol used by the Nazi government. Examples of these works include two large sculptures that featured at the newly built Ministry of Aviation office in Berlin. These eagles added to the Nazi symbolism of the building, themselves gripping swastikas and stood atop decorative columns. At the end of World War II the sculptures were removed from what is now the Detlev-Rohwedder-Haus.

Perhaps Lemcke's most significant eagle statue was the one that once stood on the roof of the Berlin Tempelhof Airport. Designed by Ernst Sagebiel and implemented by Lemcke, it stood at 4.5 m and was visible for many miles. Rather than holding a swastika in its claws, this sculpture grasped a large globe to symbolise the international aspect of the airport. The sculpture was cast in iron before being treated to appear bronze. In 1962 the statue was removed to make way for the installation of new radar equipment. The airport was closed in 2008 and the head is now located near to the entrance of the nearby Platz der Luftbrücke. This led to the area being named "Eagle Square".

=== Involvement in the 1936 Summer Olympics ===
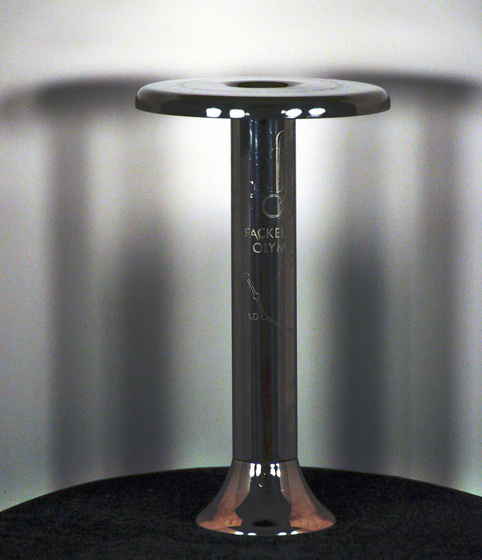
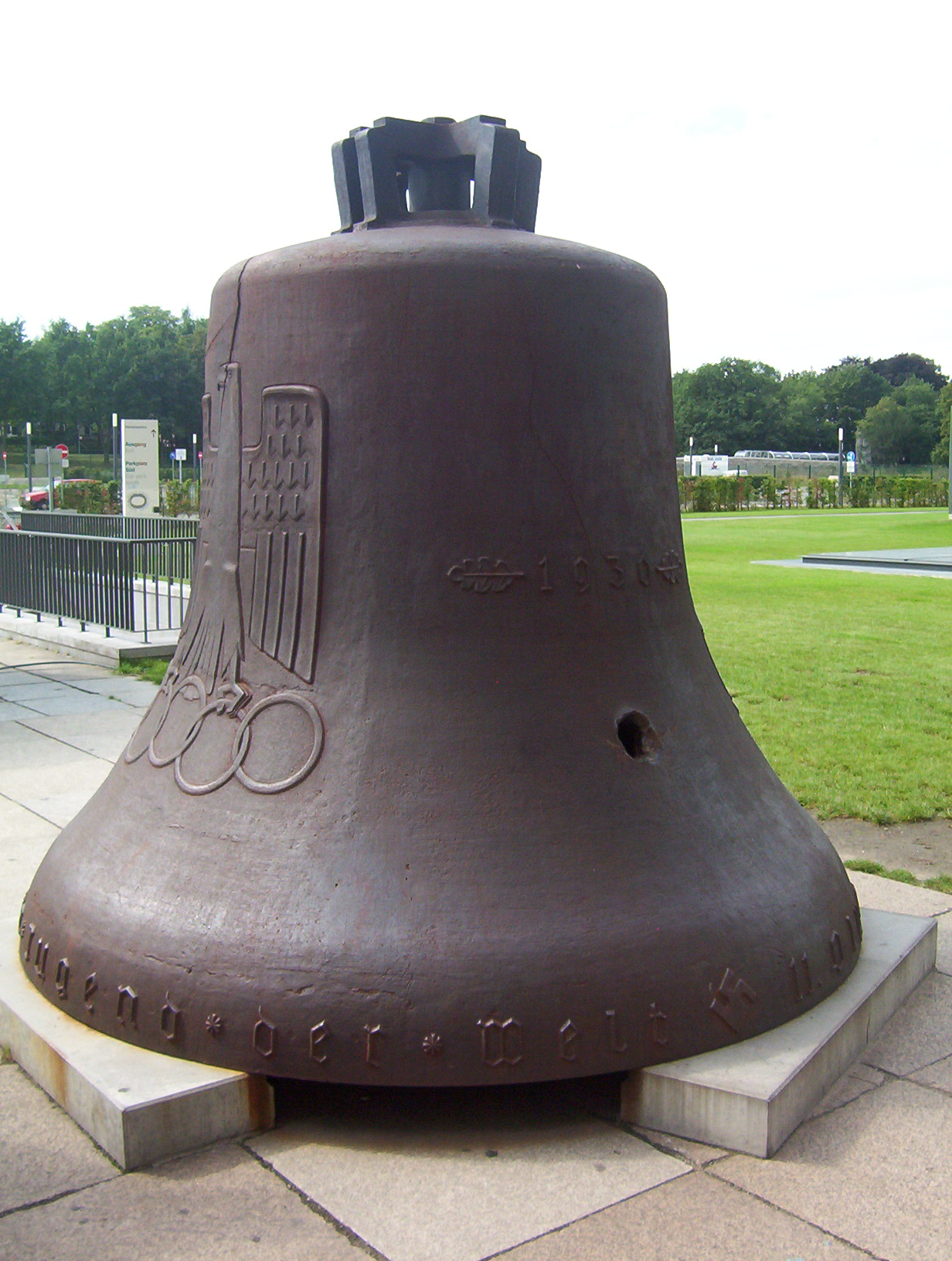
The torch and bell designed for the 1936 Summer Olympics

Lemcke designed the 27 cm wood and metal torches. German manufacturer Krupp produced 3,840 copies for the runners, over 500 more than would be needed. The shaft of the torch featured an eagle over the Olympic rings.

Along with the torch, Lemcke sculpted a bell that was struck as part of the opening ceremony. The bell features the inscription "Ich rufe die Jugend der Welt" (I summon the youth of the world).
