= Siegfried Eifrig =

German sprinter

- Siegfried Eifrig bearing the Olympic flame, Berlin 1936
- Born: 6 February 1910; Berlin, Germany
- Died: 23 June 2008 (aged 98)
- Known for: Olympic Torch Bearer

Siegfried Eifrig (6 February 1910 – 23 June 2008) was a German track and field athlete who ran the last leg of the inaugural Olympic Torch rally in the 1936 Summer Olympics.

== Biography ==
Eifrig was born in Berlin, Germany. As a member of the Sport Club Charlottenburg (SCC), Eifrig was a talented sprinter and became the 1935 4 × 400 m relay champion. His personal best times were 11.0 seconds for the 100m and 49.8 seconds for the 400m. He also competed in the traditional Berlin-Potsdam relay 40 times throughout his life.

At the age of 26, Siegfried Eifrig was chosen to carry the Olympic Flame which lit the cauldron at the first Olympic torch relay. His relay began at Unter den Linden and made its way to Olympic stadium in Berlin, where he lit two urns which burned until the end of the summer games. From the urns, the flame was then transferred to Fritz Schilgen, who lit the Olympic Cauldron in Olympic stadium. Even with his athletic talent, Eifrig did not make the German Olympic team. With his blond hair, blue eyes, and tall athletic physique, Eifrig was chosen to embody the Nazi's ideal Aryan athlete. Even though he had been chosen as a tool of political propaganda, Eifrig never belonged to the Nazi party.

It was an enormous honor to carry the torch, of course it was. I wasn’t so much nervous as really concentrating. I had to make sure nothing went wrong. There were so many people there. People said there were 300,000 people watching me on my stretch.

I carried the torch down Unter den Linden past the statue of Frederick the Great. There was a big youth event with around 30,000 young people near the Old Museum. I ran past the youths and up to an altar as tall as a man. That's where I lit the flame.

Several years after the Olympic Games, Eifrig was placed into the Wehrmacht (the German Army), where he fought in the North African campaign. During World War II, he was captured as a Prisoner of war by the British Army, where he was held for the rest of the war. During his time of internment, he organized soccer and track events as recreation for the other inmates.

After World War II, Eifrig returned to Berlin, where he married and had five children, eight grandchildren and seven great-grand children. He rebuilt his former team, Sports Club Charlottenburg, and became a key figure in the rebirth of the state bank, Berliner Sparkasse. For years, Eifrig served as the Berliner Sparkasse’s director, and later became the treasurer for the Berlin Marathon, where he continued his passion for sport and athletic competition.

The torch which Eifrig bore in the 1936 Summer Olympics was buried with other mementoes of his athletic youth in a suitcase under a bowling lane. Secret from the turbulent times in Berlin, Eifrig later returned to reclaim his relic with its remaining magnesium candle, which he placed on his livingroom mantle. Currently, the torch is scheduled to reside at the Berlin Sports Museum within the AIMS Marathon Museum of Running.

Eifrig became critical of politicians who sought to exploit the flame. He saw China's 2008 plan to carry the torch across the summit of Mount Everest as a "pointless gesture that makes a nonsense of the relay as an athletic challenge." Eifrig told the BBC that he had been "saddened by the controversy this year's relay [had] attracted ... it ought to be kept a purely sporting affair."

Eifrig died on 23 June 2008, at the age of 98.

== See also ==
- 1936 Summer Olympics
- Olympia (1938 film)
- Olympic Torch Relay
