= Karl Ritter von Halt =

IOC member

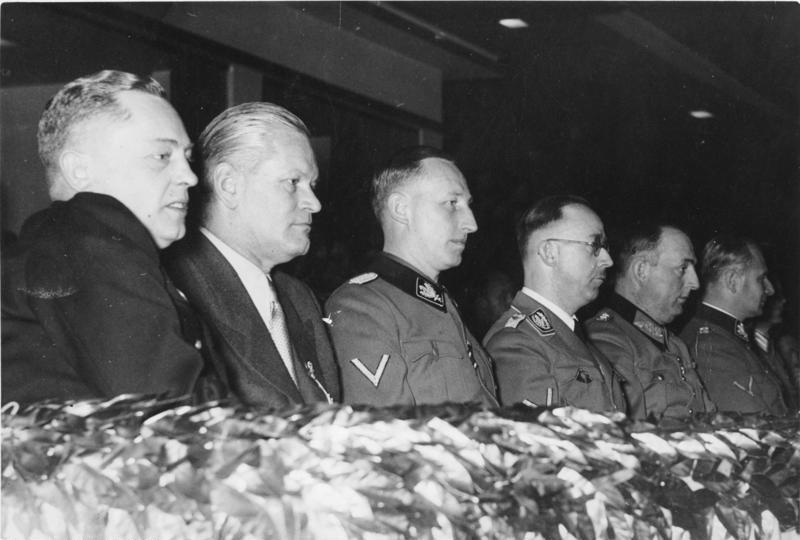
Karl Ritter von Halt is second from the left

Karl Ritter von Halt, born Karl Ferdinand Halt (2 June 1891 – 5 August 1964) was a sport official in Nazi Germany and the German Federal Republic. He was born and died in Munich.

== Biography ==
Karl Ritter von Halt was a track and field athlete who competed in the 1912 Summer Olympics. He finished 22nd in the javelin throw competition and 14th in the shot put event. He also participated in the pentathlon competition. He was eliminated in the third event because he did not finish his 200 m run. He also participated as a member of the German team in the first round of the 4x100 metre relay competition. Halt finished ninth in the decathlon.

He nearly won the decathlon at the 1914 Baltic Games in Malmö, losing to Finland's Johan Svanström by a fraction of a point after a calculation error had been fixed.

In 1921 he became Karl Ritter von Halt after he received the Military Order of Max Joseph.

In 1932, von Halt became involved in the process that led to the Olympic suspension of Finland's Paavo Nurmi.

In 1936, he was named President of the Committee for the organization of the Fourth Winter Olympics in Garmisch by Reichssportführer Hans von Tschammer und Osten. Karl Ritter von Halt was elected a member of the Executive Committee of the International Olympic Committee (IOC) in 1937, a post he held until 1945.

In 1944, Karl Ritter von Halt led the Sports Office of the Third Reich, Nationalsozialistischer Reichsbund für Leibesübungen (NSRL), taking over from Arno Breitmeyer as Reichssportführer. He remained the NSRL leader until the office and the organization were disbanded in 1945 following Nazi Germany's defeat in World War II. From 1945 to 1950, he was held at the NKVD special camp Nr. 2 at the site of the former Buchenwald concentration camp.

Karl Ritter von Halt was successful in clearing his past as Nazi leader in the post-war years, although tourists to Garmisch protested in 2006 that the town's football stadium was still named after him. It was quietly renamed Stadion am Gröben. Ritter von Halt led the National Olympic Committee of Germany between 1951 and 1961, succeeding Duke Adolf Friedrich of Mecklenburg.

| Preceded by (United States) George Bryant | President of Organizing Committee for Summer Olympic Games (with Joseph Goebbels); 1936 | Succeeded by (United Kingdom) Lord Burghley |
