= Deutscher Radfahrer-Verband =

Deutscher Radfahrer Verband pennant

The Deutscher Radfahrer-Verband (DRV), "German Cycling Association", was the cycling unit of the National Socialist League of the Reich for Physical Exercise.

== History ==
Cycling associations existed in Germany since 1884. On that year the Bund Deutscher Radfahrer (BDR), "German Cycling Federation", was established in the city of Leipzig. Later other cycling associations or clubs were founded, many of which were active and successful.

After the Enabling Act of 1933, which legally gave Hitler dictatorial control of Germany, all existing cycling associations were called to split up on their own (Selbstauflösung) before the first semester of 1933 was over. They were then invited to join the Deutscher Radfahrer-Verband, which was the corresponding branch or unit (Fachamt) created by the Nazi Sports office.

On May 31, 1945, after Nazi Germany's defeat in World War II, the American Military Government issued a special law outlawing the Nazi party and all of its branches. Known as "Law number five", this Denazification decree disbanded the Nationalsozialistischer Reichsbund für Leibesübungen along with all its facilities and departments, which included the Deutscher Radfahrer-Verband.

The German Cycling Federation was reestablished on 21 November 1948 in West Germany.

In East Germany the cycling section of the Deutscher Sportausschuss, the DDR's sports body, was established in 1946.

== See also ==
- Gleichschaltung
- Nationalsozialistischer Reichsbund für Leibesübungen
- Bund Deutscher Radfahrer
- Segregated cycle facilities
