= Ernst Sagebiel =

German architect

Ernst Sagebiel (2 October 1892 in Braunschweig (Brunswick) – 5 March 1970 in Bavaria) was a German architect.

== Life ==
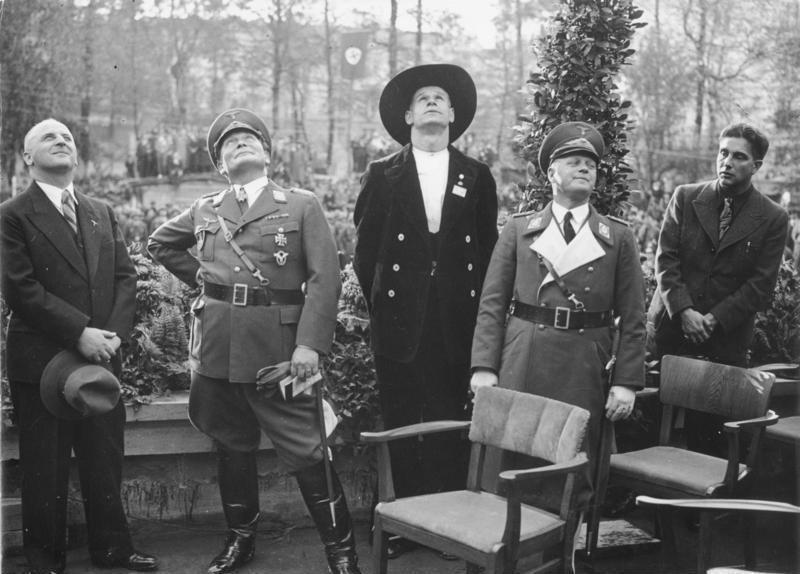
Ernst Sagebiel, Göring, Erhard Milch, (1935)

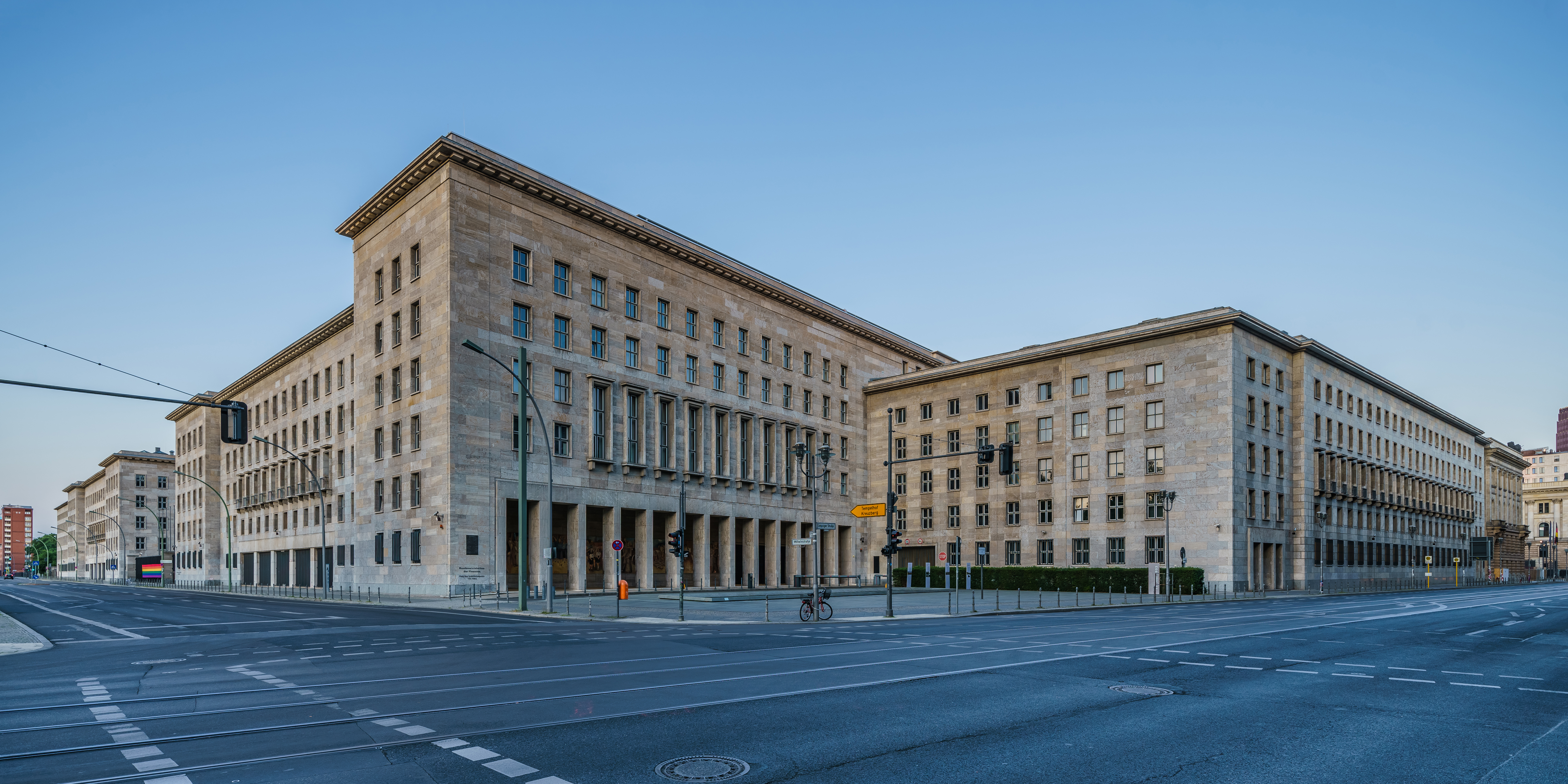
The former Reich Air Ministry building, which now houses the German Finance Ministry, now called the Detlev-Rohwedder-Haus

Sagebiel was a sculptor's son, and after his Abitur in 1912, he began his studies in architecture at the Braunschweig University of Technology. He eventually finished his studies in 1922, after they were interrupted by his participation in the First World War, which included a stint in a prisoner-of-war camp. In 1924, he joined Jakob Körfer's architectural bureau in Cologne. In 1926 he was awarded a doctorate ("Promotion"). In 1929, Sagebiel took a job in Berlin as a project leader and chief executive officer at the architect Erich Mendelsohn's office, but in 1932, he left because of the severe economic climate in Germany. He then worked as a construction foreman.

After Adolf Hitler and the Nazis seized power in 1933, Sagebiel became a member of the NSDAP and Sturmabteilung (SA).

Already by 1933, Sagebiel had, at his brother's suggestion, come to be at the Deutsche Verkehrsfliegerschule ("German Commercial Flyers' School"), which was a front organization involved more with Germany's air force buildup than with commercial flying. As of 1934, he was being trusted with planning, as well as overseeing construction of, numerous Luftwaffe barracks (in Döberitz, Berlin-Gatow and Kladow, to name a few) as leader of the special works unit.

Sagebiel's austere building style, which when compared to Albert Speer's rather classicist tendencies came across as very stark and linear, was described as "Luftwaffe modern", owing to his close association with the Luftwaffe. With his earlier building of the Reich Air Transport Ministry for Hermann Göring, which came earlier than Albert Speer's exertion of influence on the National Socialists' architectural parlance, Sagebiel set a trend that would be recognizable throughout the Third Reich. From 1938, he was directly subordinate to the Air Transport Minister, Hermann Göring, and as a result was considered among the Reich's most important architects. In the same year, he became a professor at the Technische Hochschule Berlin.

The outbreak of war against the Soviet Union in 1941 put an end to all of Sagebiel's building plans.

== List of projects and plans ==
- Columbushaus, Berlin, Project management for Erich Mendelsohn
- Reichsluftfahrtministerium, Berlin 1934 – 1935
- Tempelhof International Airport, Berlin 1935 – 1941
- Stuttgart Airport
- Munich Riem Airport
- Bücker Aircraft Works, Rangsdorf
- Regional Air Command Centres in Kiel, Königsberg and Münster
- Luftwaffe schools in Berlin-Gatow, Dresden and Potsdam-Wildpark

== Literature ==
- Elke Dittrich: Ernst Sagebiel - Leben und Werk (1892 – 1970). Lukas Verlag Berlin 2005, ISBN 3-936872-39-2
- Laurenz Demps und Carl-Ludwig Paeschke: Flughafen Tempelhof. Ullstein Verlag, 1998, ISBN 3-550-06973-1
- Hans J. Reichhardt, Wolfgang Schäche: Von Berlin nach Germania. Transit Buchverlag, Berlin 2005 (gebundene Ausgabe), ISBN 3-88747-127-X
- Wolfgang Schäche: Architektur und Städtebau in Berlin zwischen 1933 und 1945. Gebr. Mann, Berlin 2002, ISBN 3-7861-1178-2
- Jost Schäfer: "Das ehemalige Luftkreiskommando IV in Münster von Ernst Sagebiel", in Zeitschrift Westfalen, 76. Bd. Münster 1999, S. 380-401. ISSN 0043-4337

== See also ==
- Nazi architecture
- Walter Lemcke
