= German Cycling Federation =

National governing body of cycle racing in Germany

- Sport: Cycle racing
- Abbreviation: BDR
- Founded: 1948
- Affiliation: UCI
- Regional affiliation: UEC
- President: Rudolf Scharping
- (founded): 1884

Official website
- www.rad-net.de
- (Germany)

The German Cycling Federation or BDR (in German: Bund Deutscher Radfahrer) is the national governing body of cycle racing in Germany.

The BDR is a member of the UCI and the UEC.

== History ==
The BDR was first created in 1884 in Leipzig, only to be subsequently dissolved in 1933 after the Enabling Act of 1933, which legally gave Hitler dictatorial control of Germany. The Deutscher Radfahrer-Verband (DRV), a unit (Fachamt) of the Nazi Sports Body took over, until it was disbanded on May 31, 1945, for being the branch of a Nazi organization.

The BDR was re-established on 21 November 1948.

In East Germany the cycling section of the Deutscher Sportausschuss, the DDR's sports body, was established in 1946. In 1957 it was renamed Deutscher Radsport-Verband der DDR (DRSV), "East German Cycling Federation", which was responsible for the sport until the merger of both countries on 7 December 1990.

Since 2005, the president of the BDR has been former Federal Minister of Defence Rudolf Scharping. Between 2001 and 2004, former track-and-field athlete Sylvia Schenk led the BDR.

== Work ==
The BDR issues racing licences, organises training for athletes and coaches, undertakes youth work, and oversees cycle races in Germany. It works regionally through a network of local associations.

The BDR is also an advocacy organisation, lobbying for the interests of both sporting and leisure cyclists, although it does not aim to represent cyclists who use their bicycles on the road for transportation.

== Disciplines ==
The BDR covers almost all disciplines of cycle sport: road racing, track racing, cyclo-cross, artistic cycling, cycle ball, cycle polo, BMX racing, BMX freestyle, bike trial and mountain bike racing.

In addition to the sporting disciplines, leisure cycling is also covered, including cycle touring.

== Regional associations ==
- Badischer Radsportverband e.V (Baden)
- Bayerischer Radsportverband e.V. (Bavaria)
- Berliner Radsportverband e.V. (Berlin)
- Brandenburgischer Radsportverband e.V. (Brandenburg)
- Bremer Radsportverband e. V. (Bremen)
- Radsportverband Hamburg e.V. (Hamburg)
- Hessischer Radfahrerverband e.V. (Hesse)
- Radsportverband Mecklenburg-Vorpommern e.V. (Mecklenburg-Western Pomerania)
- Radsportverband Niedersachsen e.V. (Lower Saxony)
- Radsportverband Nordrh.-Westfalen e.V. (North Rhine-Westphalia)
- Radsportverband Rheinland-Pfalz e.V. (Rhineland-Palatinate)
- Saarländischer Radfahrerbund e.V. (Saarland)
- Sächsischer Radfahrerbund e.V. (Saxony)
- Landessportverb. Radsp. Sachsen-Anhalt e.V. (Saxony-Anhalt)
- Radsportverband Schleswig-Holstein e.V. (Schleswig-Holstein)
- Thüringer Radsportverband e.V. (Thuringia)
- Württembergischer Radsportverband e.V. (Württemberg)

== Other ==
The Bundesradfahrerdenkmal (federal monument to cyclists) is located in the Kurpark of Bad Schmiedeberg.
