= Hans von Tschammer und Osten =

Nazi German sports official (1887–1943)

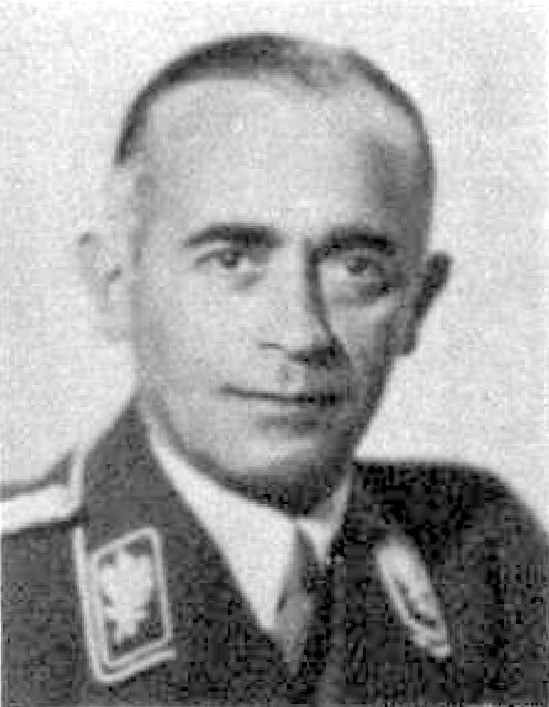

Reich Sports Leader
- In office 19 July 1933 – 25 March 1943
- Leader: Adolf Hitler
- Preceded by: Office established
- Succeeded by: Arno Breitmeyer

Personal details
- Born: 25 October 1887 Dresden, Kingdom of Saxony, Germany
- Died: 25 March 1943 (aged 55) Berlin, Germany
- Cause of death: Pneumonia
- Party: Nazi Party
- Spouse: Sophie Margarethe von Zimmermann

Military service
- Allegiance: German Empire; Weimar Republic
- Branch/service: Royal Saxon Army; Reichswehr
- Years of service: 1914–1920
- Rank: Hauptmann
- Unit: 6th Royal Saxon Infantry Regiment
- Battles/wars: World War I
- Awards: Iron Cross, 1st and 2nd class

Hans von Tschammer und Osten (25 October 1887 – 25 March 1943) was a German sport official, SA leader and a member of the Reichstag for the Nazi Party of Nazi Germany. He was married to Sophie Margarethe von Carlowitz.

Hans von Tschammer und Osten led the German Sports Office Deutscher Reichsausschuss für Leibesübungen (DRA) "German Reich Commission for Physical Exercise" after the Nazi seizure of power in 1933. In July the same year Hans von Tschammer was granted the title of Reichssportführer, "Reich Sports Leader", and the whole sports sphere in Germany was placed under his control. He re-established the organization he led, transforming it into the Sports governing body of the Third Reich, Deutscher Reichsbund für Leibesübungen (DRL) "Sports League of the German Reich". In December 1938 it was renamed Nationalsozialistischer Reichsbund für Leibesübungen "National-Socialist Sports League of the German Reich". Von Tschammer held the high-profile post of Reichssportführer until his death in 1943.

The name of today's DFB-Pokal, first contested in the 1934–35 season during von Tschammer's tenure as Reichssportführer, was known as Hans von Tschammer und Osten-Pokal ("Tschammerpokal") until it was last played in Nazi Germany in 1943. Many other innovative improvements regarding the organization of sports events that von Tschammer's formidable Reich Sports Organ introduced, like the Olympic torch relay, are still in use today.

== Early life ==
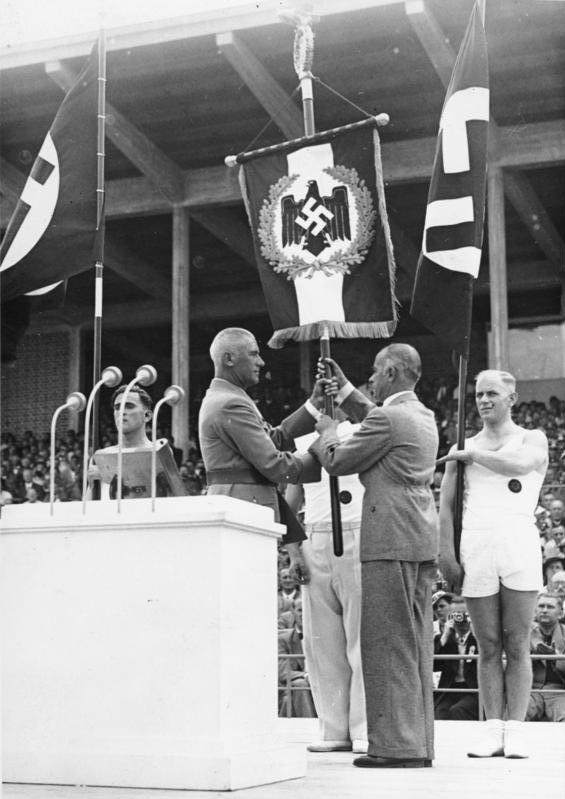
Hans von Tschammer und Osten and Wilhelm Frick at the Deutsches Turn- und Sportfest in 1938.

Hans von Tschammer und Osten was born in a family of landed gentry. After receiving a traditional upper-class education he went to fight at the front as an officer with the 6th Royal Saxon Infantry Regiment in the First World War. He was severely wounded in October 1914, resulting in the permanent paralysis of his right hand. He continued to serve in staff positions throughout the war, earning the Iron Cross, 1st and 2nd class. Leaving the Reichswehr in 1920 with the rank of Hauptmann, he returned to civilian life and became the agricultural manager on his ancestral estate. From 1923 to 1926 von Tschammer became the leader in Saxony of the Young German Order, one of the largest paramilitary groups in the Weimar Republic.

== Nazi Party career ==
In 1929 he joined the Nazi Party and became a member of the Party's paramilitary organization, the SA, with the rank of SA-Standartenführer. In March 1932 he took over the leadership of the SA-Gruppe Mitte (Center Group) headquartered in Dessau and was promoted to SA-Gruppenführer. At the July 1932 German federal election, von Tschammer und Osten won a seat as a member of the German Reichstag from electoral constituency 10 (Magdeburg). He would retain this Reichstag seat until his death.

After Adolf Hitler's accession to power, von Tschammer was named Reichskommissar für Turnen und Sport (Reich Commissioner for Gym and Sports) of the German Sports Office Deutscher Reichsausschuss für Leibesübungen (DRA) in April 1933. Although he had been a relatively unknown figure in German sports, von Tschammer saw as his goal the use of sports "to improve the morale and productivity of German workers." Sporting skills were made a criterion for school graduation as well as a necessary qualification for certain jobs and admission to universities.

Von Tschammer disbanded the DRA, branded as a "bourgeois entity", on 5 May 1933 (officially 10 May). He was then elevated to Reichssportführer on 19 July and the whole sports sphere in Germany was placed under his control. In January 1934, he was named the head of the Sportamt (Sports Office) of Strength Through Joy, the Nazi recreational organization. He replaced the DRA with a Nazi-oriented organization, the Deutscher Reichsbund für Leibesübungen (DRL) on 27 July 1934, to serve as the official sports governing body of Nazi Germany.

Von Tschammer was an active and able promoter of sports in Nazi Germany. He instituted the present-day German Football-Federation Cup. He also commissioned the publication of Sport und Staat (Sports and State), a massive four-volume Nazi propaganda report on the organized sports activities in the Third Reich. Sport und Staat was made by Arno Breitmeyer and Hitler's personal photographer Heinrich Hoffmann. This lavishly illustrated work had many pictures and information about the various Nazi organizations, i.e. SA, NSKK, Bund Deutscher Mädel, Hitler Jugend, etc. Printed in 1934 by the publishing house of the German Sports Aid Funds, a branch of the DRL, only volume one and two of a planned series of four volumes were published.

The aims of the promotion of sports in the Third Reich included hardening the spirit of every German as well as making German citizens feel that they were part of a wider national purpose. This was in line with the ideals of Friedrich Ludwig Jahn, the "Father of physical exercises", who connected the steeling of one's own body to a healthy spirit and promoted the idea of a unified, strong Germany. A more controversial aim was the demonstration of Aryan physical superiority. Under von Tschammer's leadership, German Jewish athletes were systematically hindered by being denied adequate facilities and the opportunity to compete. Hans von Tschammer und Osten enjoyed the Nazi sports festivals in which he took a keen interest as organizer. He appears often as a spectator in a white suit during the massive displays of Nazi pageantry.

On 17 August 1936, von Tschammer was appointed to the Prussian State Council by Prussian Minister President Hermann Göring. The 1936 Summer Olympics in Berlin were held during von Tschammer's tenure as Reichssportführer and President of the German Olympic Committee. He played a major role in the structure and organization of the Olympic Games together with Carl Diem, who was the former secretary of the Deutscher Reichsausschuss für Leibesübungen (DRA). Von Tschammer entrusted the organization of the Fourth Winter Olympics in Garmisch-Partenkirchen to Karl Ritter von Halt, whom he named President of the Committee for the organization of the games. Von Tschammer would be later blamed by historians for enforcing a ban on non-Aryans in Germany's Olympic team, a fact that was condemned internationally as a violation of the Olympic ethical code. But it is doubtful that he was the only one of the NSRL leaders behind that decision.

Despite his major role in the Olympics and in the world of sports of his time, von Tschammer never became a member of the International Olympic Committee (IOC), a post he craved. In 1937 Karl Ritter von Halt was elected as member of the Executive Committee of the IOC instead of him. In January 1937, he was made head of the Sports and Physical Exercise Department in the Reich Ministry of the Interior and, in 1938, he was given the rank of State Secretary there. The same year he was promoted to SA-Obergruppenführer. However, von Tschammer's influence began rapidly eroding, as war preparations diminished the influence of sports in Nazi Germany in favour of militarism.

Von Tschammer would never see the end of the organization he had led for so long, nor Germany's defeat in World War II, for he died from pneumonia in Berlin in 1943. The assets he left behind were negligible for a man of his position. Von Tschammer was succeeded as Reichssportführer by Arno Breitmeyer.

== See also ==
- DFB-Pokal
- Nationalsozialistischer Reichsbund für Leibesübungen
- 1936 Summer Olympics
- Deutsches Turn- und Sportfest 1938
