= German Olympic Sports Confederation =

German sports organisation

- Country: Germany
- Code: GER
- Created: 1895
- Recognized: 1895
- Continental Association: EOC
- Headquarters: Frankfurt am Main, Germany
- President: Thomas Weikert
- Secretary General: Otto Fricke
- Website: www.dosb.de/en

The German Olympic Sports Confederation (German: Deutscher Olympischer Sportbund, DOSB; IOC Code: GER) was founded on 20 May 2006 by a merger of the Deutscher Sportbund (DSB), and the Nationales Olympisches Komitee für Deutschland (NOK). The DOSB is recognized as the German National Olympic Committee by the IOC.

Seated in Frankfurt am Main, it represents 86,000 clubs and 29,000,000 members, about a third of the population of Germany.

== Presidential Board ==
DOSB-President is Thomas Weikert. Also members of the presidential board are:

- Verena Bentele (Vice President)
- Kerstin Holze (Vice President)
- Prof. Dr. Martin Engelhardt (Vice President)
- Jens-Peter Nettekoven (Vice President)
- Miriam Welte (Vice President)
- Stefan Raid (chairman of Deutsche Sportjugend)
- Mareike Miller (representative of the athletes)
- Kim Bui (German IOC Member)
- Michael Mronz (German IOC Member)

== Executive Board ==
- Otto Fricke (CEO)
- Thomas Arnold (CFO)
- Olaf Tabor
- Michaela Röhrbein
- Leon Ries

== History and structure ==
History and Structure (in German)

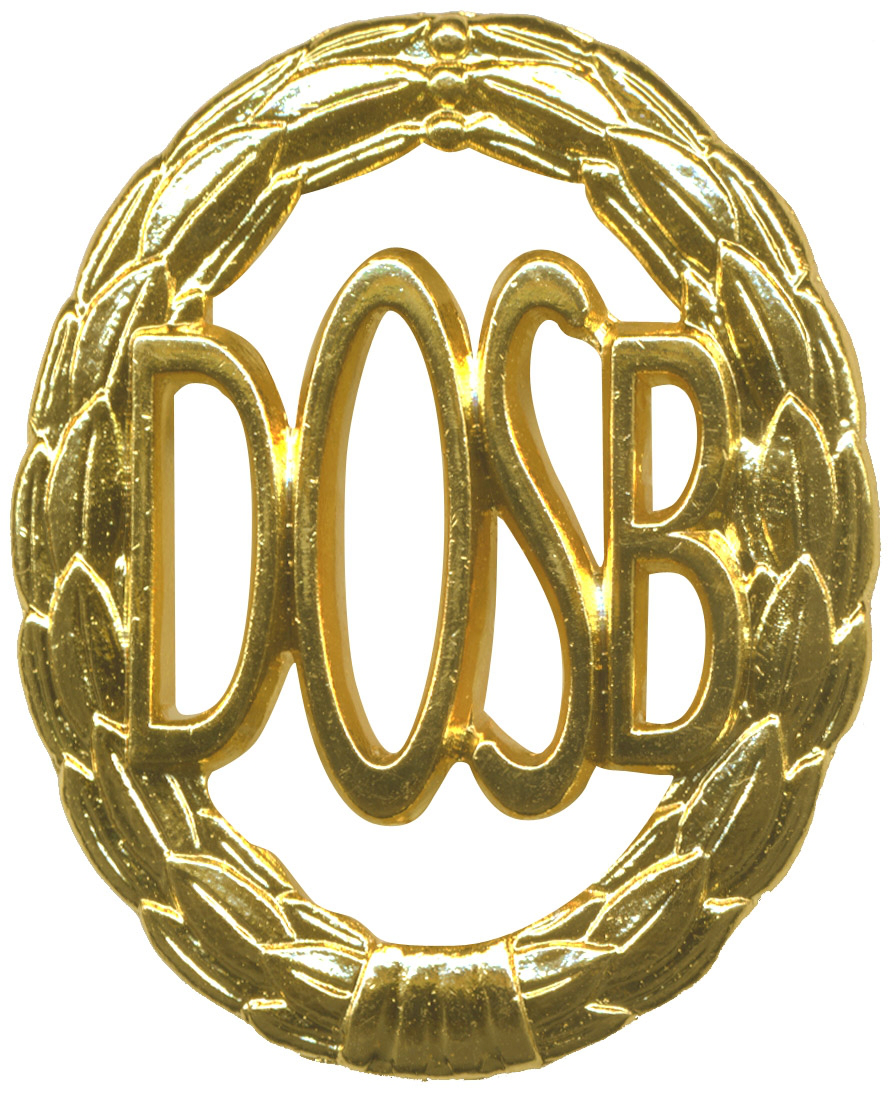
Deutsches Sportabzeichen in Gold

Germany first founded a national Olympic committee (NOC) in 1895, which was purposefully named "Komitee für die Beteiligung Deutschlands an den Olympischen Spielen zu Athen" ("Committee for the participation of Germany at the Olympic Games in Athens"). It was recognized by the IOC, and Germany took part in the 1896 Summer Olympics for the first time. The name of the temporary NOC was changed to reflect the next two host towns, before it became permanent after 1904.

The 1916 Summer Olympics were awarded to Berlin, but were later canceled because of World War I. At that time, Germany and other Central Powers were excluded from the "Olympic family", which was dominated by the Entente Powers. In 1917, the "Deutscher Reichsausschuss für Olympische Spiele" (DRA, DRAfOS "German Imperial Commission for Olympic Games") was renamed Deutscher Reichsausschuss für Leibesübungen (DRL, "German Imperial Commission for Physical Exercise") to reflect their exclustion from the Olympics.

In lieu of the Olympic Games of 1920, to which Germany and its allies were not invited, "Deutsche Kampfspiele" ("German Sports Contests") were organized, both for Summer and Winter, The 1922 Winter edition predated the first Olympic Winter Games by two years. Berlin, having prepared for the Olympics 1916, was the site for the first Summer event:

- 1922
  - Garmisch und Partenkirchen (Oberbayern)
  - 18 – ?? June 1922 Berlin
- 1926
  - Triberg und Titisee (Schwarzwald)
  - 4 – 11 July 1926 Köln
- 1930
  - Krummhübel (Riesengebirge)
  - 26 – 29 June 1930 Breslau

Germany was also not invited to join the 1924 Summer Olympics. In 1925, the DRL split up, to remain focused on sports in Germany, while the NOC section became the Deutscher Olympischer Ausschuss (DOA, "German Olympic Commission") to focus on international relations and the promotion of the return of Germany to Olympics. This succeeded in 1928, with Germany taking part in both the summer and winter games.

In 1931, the IOC awarded both of the 1936 Olympic Games to Germany. The DRL and NOC organisations remained separate, through the rise of Nazi Germany from 1933 onwards.

After the war, Germany was occupied and partitioned. In 1946, the Deutscher Olympischer Ausschuss (DOA) was dissolved. In June 1947 Adolf Friedrich zu Mecklenburg founded a new provisional committee, which was not recognized by the IOC as it did not yet represent any recognized state. On 23 May 1949, the Federal Republic of Germany was established on the territory of the Western-occupied zones. On 24 September 1949, the Nationales Olympisches Komitee für Deutschland ("National Olympic Committee for Germany") was founded in Bonn as a successor to the DOA.

In October 1949, under Soviet occupation, the German Democratic Republic was founded, and on 22 April 1951 the separate Nationales Olympisches Komitee für Ostdeutschland ("National Olympic Committee for East Germany") was established. This was renamed in 1965 to "Nationales Olympisches Komitee der Deutsche Demokratische Republik" ("National Olympic Committee of the German Democratic Republic"). In 1968 was it recognized by the IOC as a fully independent member.

As a third German state, under French occupation, was the Saar Protectorate (1947–1956), which also founded sporting organisations in order to take part in international competition, like football and the Olympics. The Nationales Olympisches Komitee des Saarlandes ("National Olympic Committee of the Saarland") was founded in 1950 and recognized by the IOC.

After criticism due to lack of success in 2004, the Deutscher Sportbund ("German") (DSB) and the Nationales Olympisches Komitee für Deutschland (NOK) decided to merge in 2005.

== Member organisations ==
=== 16 State-level member organisations ===
- Sports Confederation of Bavaria (Bayerischer Landes-Sportverband)
- Sports Confederation of Hamburg (Hamburger Sportbund)
- Sports Confederation of Baden-Württemberg (Landessportverband Baden-Württemberg)
- Sports Confederation of Berlin (Landessportbund Berlin)
- Sports Confederation of Brandenburg (Landessportbund Brandenburg)
- Sports Confederation of Bremen (Landessportbund Bremen)
- Sports Confederation of Saarland (Landessportverband für das Saarland)
- Sports Confederation of Hesse (Landessportbund Hessen)
- Sports Confederation of Mecklenburg-West Pomerania (Landessportbund Mecklenburg-Vorpommern)
- Sports Confederation of Lower Saxony (Landessportbund Niedersachsen)
- Sports Confederation of North Rhine-Westphalia (Landessportbund Nordrhein-Westfalen)
- Sports Confederation of Rhineland-Palatinate (Landessportbund Rheinland-Pfalz)
- Sports Confederation of Saxony (Landessportbund Sachsen)
- Sports Confederation of Saxony-Anhalt (Landessportbund Sachsen-Anhalt)
- Sports Confederation of Schleswig-Holstein (Landessportverband Schleswig-Holstein)
- Sports Confederation of Thuringia (Landessportbund Thüringen)

=== 62 member organisations ===
42 Olympic Sport Federations

- American Football Association of Germany (American Football Verband Deutschland)
- German Alpine Club (Deutscher Alpenverein, DAV)
- German Baseball and Softball Federation (Deutscher Baseball und Softball Verband, DBV)
- German Bobsleigh, Luge, and Skeleton Federation (Bob-und Schlittenverband für Deutschland, BSD)
- German Cricket Federation (Deutscher Cricket Bund, DCB)
- German Lacrosse Federation (Deutscher Lacross Verband, DLaxV)
- German Judo Federation (Deutscher Judo-Bund, DJB)
- German Cycling Federation (Bund Deutscher Radfahrer, BDR)
- German Canoe Federation (Deutscher Kanu-Verband, DKV)
- German Weightlifting Federation (Bundesverband Deutscher Gewichtheber, BVDG)
- German Athletics Association (Deutscher Leichtathletik-Verband, DLV)
- German Ice Skating Union (Deutsche Eislauf-Union, DEU)
- German Wrestling Federation (Deutscher Ringer-Bund, DRB)
- German Ice Speed-Skating Association (Deutsche Eisschnelllauf-Gemeinschaft, DESG)
- German Rowing Federation (Deutscher Ruderverband, DRV)
- German Equestrian Federation (Deutsche Reiterliche Vereinigung)
- German Rugby Federation (Deutscher Rugby-Verband, DRV)
- German Taekwondo Union (Deutsche Taekwondo Union, DTU)
- German Shooting and Archery Federation (Deutscher Schützenbund, DSB)
- German Triathlon Union (Deutsche Triathlon Union, DTU)
- German Swimming Federation (Deutscher Schwimm-Verband, DSV)
- German Badminton Association (Deutscher Badminton-Verband, DBV)
- German Sailing Federation (Deutscher Segler-Verband, DSV)
- German Basketball Federation (Deutscher Basketball Bund, DBB)
- German Ski Association (Deutscher Skiverband, DSV)
- German Boxing Federation (Deutscher Boxsport-Verband, DBV)
- German Tennis Federation (Deutscher Tennis Bund, DTB)
- German Roller and Inline-Skating Sport Federation (Deutscher Rollsport-und Inline Verband, DRIV)
- German Curling Association (Deutscher Curling Verband, DCV)
- German Table Tennis Federation (Deutscher Tischtennis-Bund, DTTB)
- German Ice Hockey Federation (Deutscher Eishockey-Bund, DEB)
- German Gymnastics Federation (Deutscher Turner-Bund, DTB)
- German Fencing Federation (Deutscher Fechter-Bund, DFB)
- German Modern Pentathlon Federation (Deutscher Verband für Modernen Fünfkampf, DVMF)
- German Football Association (Deutscher Fußball-Bund, DFB)
- German Volleyball Association (Deutscher Volleyball-Verband, DVV)
- German Golf Association (Deutscher Golf Verband, DGV)
- German Snowboard Federation (Snowboard Verband Deutschland, SVD)
- German Squash Association (Deutscher Squash Verband, DSQV)
- German Handball Association (Deutscher Handballbund, DHB)
- German Surfing Federation (Deutscher Wellenreitverband, DWV)
- German Hockey Federation (Deutscher Hockey-Bund, DHB)

28 Non-Olympic Sport Federations

- German Mini Golf Sport Association (Deutscher Minigolfsport Verband, DMV)
- German Federation of Powerlifters (Bundesverband Deutscher Kraftdreikämpfer, BVDK)
- German Motor Sport Federation (Deutscher Motor Sport Bund, DMSB)
- German Billiard Union (Deutsche Billard-Union, DBU)
- German Motorboat Association (Deutscher Motoryachtverband, DMYV)
- German Life Saving Association (Deutsche Lebens-Rettungs-Gesellschaft, DLRG)
- German Heavy Athletics and Tug of War Federation (Deutscher Rasenkraftsport- und Tauzieh-Verband, DRTV)
- German Aero Club (Deutscher Aero Club, DAeC)
- German Chess Federation (Deutscher Schachbund, DSB)
- German Skibob Federation (Deutscher Skibob Verband, DSBV)
- National Paralympic Committee Germany (Deutscher Behindertensportverband, DBS)
- German Acrobatic Gymnastics Federation (Deutscher Sportakrobatik-Bund. DSAB)
- German Boccia, Boules and Pétanque Association (Deutscher Boccia-, Boule- und Pétanque-Verband, DBBPV)
- German Darts Federation (Deutscher Dart-Verband, DDV)
- German Dance Sport Federation (Deutscher Tanzsportverband, DTV)
- German Ice Stock Sport Association (Deutscher Eisstock-Verband, DESV)
- German Waterski and Wakeboard Federation (Deutscher Wasserski- und Wakeboardverband, DWWV)
- German Deaf Sports Federation (Deutscher Gehörlosen-Sportverband, DGS)
- German Floorball Federation (Floorball-Verband Deutschland)
- German Ju-Jitsu Federation (Deutscher Ju-Jutsu Verband, DJJV)
- German Underwater Federation (Verband Deutscher Sporttaucher, VDST)
- German Karate Federation (Deutscher Karate Verband, DKV)
- German Nine- and Ten-pin Bowling Association (Deutscher Kegler- und Bowlingbund, DKB)

=== 20 specials member organisations ===
- Allgemeiner Deutscher Hochschulsportverband
- Deutsches Polizeisportkuratorium
- Bundesverband staatl. anerk. Berufsfachschulen für Gymnastik und Sport
- DJK-Sportverband
- CVJM-Sport
- Gewerkschaft Erziehung und Wissenschaft—Sportkommission
- Deutsche Gesellschaft für Sportmedizin und Prävention (Deutscher Sportärztebund) e. V.
- Kneipp-Bund e.V.
- Deutsche Olympische Gesellschaft
- Makkabi Deutschland
- Deutsche Vereinigung für Sportwissenschaft
- Rad-und Kraftfahrerbund (RKB) "Solidarität" Deutschland 1896
- Deutscher Aikido-Bund
- Special Olympics Deutschland e.V.
- Deutscher Betriebssportverband
- Stiftung Sicherheit im Skisport
- Deutscher Sportlehrerverband
- Verband Deutscher Eisenbahner-Sportvereine e. V. (VDES)
- Deutscher Verband für das Skilehrwesen—Interski Deutschland
- Deutscher Verband für Freikörperkultur e.V.

== See also ==
- Germany at the Olympics
- National Paralympic Committee Germany
- National Socialist League of the Reich for Physical Exercise
