= Deutsches Turn- und Sportfest 1938 =

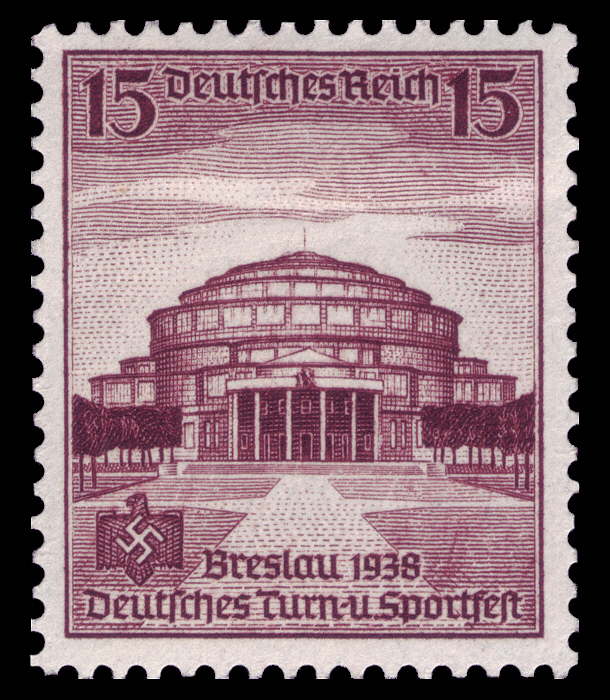
Stamp marking the 1938 games

The ceremony of "handing over" (Bannerüberführung): This new Sports Office standard supplied the occasion to Dr. Wilhelm Frick, the leader of the Breslau event, to make a speech concerning the further Nazification of the NSRL.

The Deutsches Turn- und Sportfest ('German Gym and Sports Celebration') was the last big sports event organized by the Nationalsozialistischer Reichsbund für Leibesübungen, the Sports governing body of the Third Reich. It took place in Breslau (now Wrocław) the most important city of Silesia, now in Poland. The event was staged on 23–31 July 1938 at the city's Hermann-Göring-Stadion (originally the Silesian Arena, today the site of the Olympic Stadium.)

This highly nationalistic sports event was officially commemorating the 125th anniversary of the historical German Wars of Liberation against Napoleon and the first award of the Iron Cross in the city of Breslau itself in 1813. It was staged as a grand patriotic, expansionist occasion, illustrating the clamor for a Greater Germany to the public. This event gathered German athletes brought from many different parts of the world, like Argentina, South West Africa, Italy, the US and South Africa. It also became a gathering of representatives of German ethnic minorities, mainly from Eastern Europe (Siebenbürgen, Banat) who staged processions dressed in their colorful folkloric costumes, a display of the Nazi Drang nach Osten policies.

Not only sports competitions and athletes' parades took place, but also numerous military, civil, and folklorical-costume processions in the mains streets of the city of Breslau.

== Symbolism of the event ==
The Deutsches Turn- und Sportfest was a highly political event, attended by many high-ranking Nazi officials. The event was presided over by Reichssportführer (NSRL leader) Hans von Tschammer und Osten and the patron of the festival, Reich minister of the interior Wilhelm Frick. Adolf Hitler and other high-ranking personalities of the Third Reich attended the inaugural venue of the games. During this occasion Hitler gave a speech from the balcony of Hotel Monopol in Breslau.

The event and its celebration of Germanism, as well as the choice of Dr. Wilhelm Frick to lead it, was part of the creation of a war-preparation atmosphere by the Nazi state. Minister of the Interior Frick spearheaded Germany's rearmament in violation of the Versailles Treaty. His inaugural speech was full of war symbolism, setting the mood for the events that would culminate the following year with the invasion of nearby Poland, then just a few miles to the east of Breslau.

Viciously attacked and fanatically defended, the city of Breslau would suffer much destruction towards the end of World War II.

== Commemorative editions ==
The Post Office of the Reich issued special stamps and postcards to mark the occasion of the 1938 Breslau Games.

Volk in Leibesübungen (A people into Physical Exercise), a lavishly illustrated commemorative book on the Sportfest was published in Berlin the same year on behalf of the Reichssportführer Hans von Tschammer und Osten. The pictures of this volume were made by Heinrich Hoffman, Hitler's personal photographer.

== Results ==
Soccer competition results.

The overall winner was Gau Ostmark (Austria).

Final

30 July 1938 Breslau / Ostmark - Niedersachsen 4-1

Third place Play-off

30 July 1938 Breslau / Südwest (1) - Württemberg 5-0

Semifinals

28 July 1938 Breslau / Ostmark - Württemberg 2-0

28 July 1938 Breslau / Niedersachsen - Südwest 4-1

Final (Consolation tournament)

30 July 1938 Breslau / Sachsen - Mittelrhein 1-0

Semifinals (Consolation tournament)

29 July 1938 Breslau / Sachsen - Bavaria 2-1

29 July 1938 Breslau / Mittelrhein - Westphalia 2-1

Quarter-finals (Consolation tournament)

28 July 1938 Breslau / Sachsen - Brandenburg 2-1

28 July 1938 Breslau / Mittelrhein - Baden 5-2

28 July 1938 Breslau / Silesia - Bavaria 1-2

28 July 1938 Breslau / Westphalia - Mitte (2) 4-2

Preliminary round (Consolation tournament)

26 July 1938 Münsterberg / East Prussia - Sachsen 0-2

26 July 1938 Breslau / Mittelrhein - Pommern 6-0

26 July 1938 Brieg / Bavaria - Niederrhein 5-4

26 July 1938 Breslau / Westphalia - Nordmark (3) 4-2

Quarter-finals

26 July 1938 Breslau / Silesia - Ostmark 2-8

26 July 1938 Breslau / Niedersachsen - Brandenburg 3-1

26 July 1938 Breslau / Württemberg - Mitte 5-1

26 July 1938 Breslau / Südwest - Baden 4-3

Eight-finals

24 July 1938 Ratibor / Ostmark - Mittelrhein 3-0

24 July 1938 Liegnitz / Niedersachsen - Sachsen 2-0

24 July 1938 Neisse / Württemberg - Westphalia 3-0

24 July 1938 Waldenburg / Südwest - Bavaria 4-1

24 July 1938 Beuthen / Silesia - Pommern 6-4

24 July 1938 Frankfurt/O. / Brandenburg - East Prussia 3-0

24 July 1938 Görlitz / Mitte - Nordmark (3) 1-0 [aet]

24 July 1938 Schweidnitz / Baden - Niederrhein 4-3

Preliminary round

17 Jul 1938 Weimar / Sachsen - Hessen 4-3

(1) - Palatinate and Saarland. - (2) Thuringia, Anhalt and the Province of Saxony. - (3) Schleswig-Holstein, Hamburg and Mecklenburg

== See also ==
- Nationalsozialistischer Reichsbund für Leibesübungen
- Lebensraum
- Causes of World War II

== Notes and references ==
- Eyewitness account of the time in Breslau
- Information on sailing events (de)
- Polish-German-English site on Wroclaw
