= Arno Breitmeyer =

German sport official

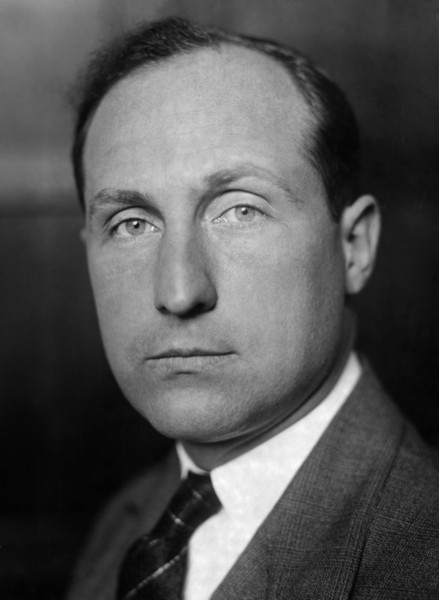
Breitmeyer in 1933

Arno Breitmeyer (19 April 1903, in Berlin – 20 April 1944) was a German sport official. He began his sports career as a successful competition rower. In 1933 he became editor of the sports section of the Völkischer Beobachter, the Nazi Party's official newspaper.

== Biography ==
Arno Breitmeyer joined the NSDAP in May 1933. He then rose to become an important sports official of the Third Reich. Breitmeyer was first adviser and vice president of the Reich Sports Office (DRL/NSRL, Nationalsozialistischer Reichsbund für Leibesübungen) during Hans von Tschammer und Osten's tenure as Reichs Sports Leader.

Arno Breitmeyer was commissioned by von Tschammer to write an extensive illustrated report on the organized sports activities in the Third Reich. Breitmeyer was assisted by Adolf Hitler's personal photographer Heinrich Hoffmann in the venture. The first volume was printed in 1934 by the publishing house of the German Sports Aid Funds. Only volume one and two of a planned series of heavily illustrated four volumes were published. The purpose of this book was to advertise the importance of physical exercise among the Nazis. This propaganda work has many pictures and information about the various Nazi organizations, i.e. SA, NSKK, Bund Deutscher Mädel, Hitler Jugend, etc.

At von Tschammer's death in 1943 Arno Breitmeyer became the leader (Reichssportführer).

There is some controversy regarding Arno Breitmeyer's attitude towards the Nazi regime. Some sources claim that he belonged to the SS and that he was known for his antisemitic views. Other sources, however, state that he joined the Nazi party relatively early, displaying Nazi zeal, in order to protect his wife who was of Jewish origin.

Breitmeyer was an Oberregierungsrat candidate to be a member of the Reichstag (MdR, Mitglied des Reichstags) in 1938. At the time of his death in 1944 he was an SA (Sturmabteilung) Brigadeführer, ranked as Generalmajor (the equivalent of major-general in the U.S. Army or a Brigadier-general in the British Army).

Breitmeyer was succeeded as Reichssportführer by Karl Ritter von Halt.

== Works ==
- Arno Breitmeyer & P. G. Hoffmann, Sport und Staat. Im Auftrage des Reichssportführers, Selbstverlag des Hilfsfonds für den Deutschen Sport, 1934. (2 vols).

== References & External links ==
- German Jewish Sport 1898–1938 and the Anti-Semitic Discourse
