= National Socialist League of the Reich for Physical Exercise =

Umbrella organization for sports and physical education in Nazi Germany

- Nationalsozialistischer Reichsbund für Leibesübungen
- Flag of the NSRL

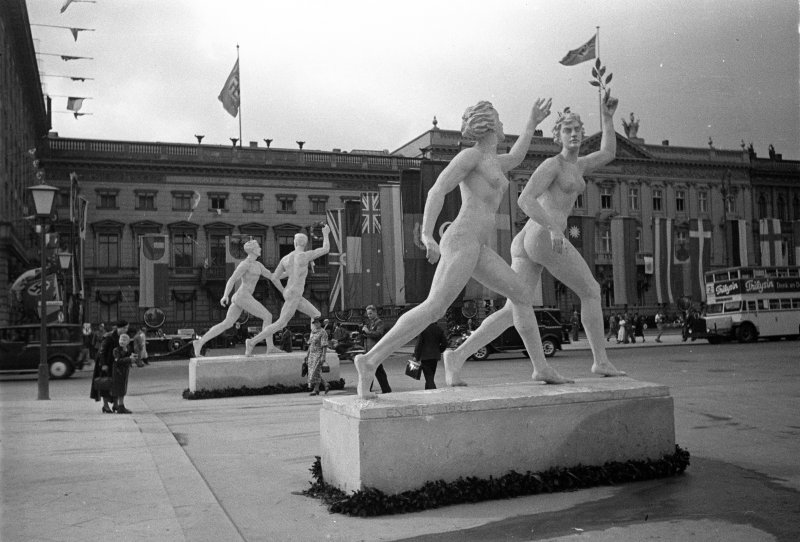
- Monument at Pariser Platz in Berlin, 1936. The promotion of sports during the Nazi regime went hand-in-hand with theatrical nationalistic triumphalism.

Agency overview
- Formed: 27 July 1934
- Preceding agency: Deutscher Reichsausschuss für Leibesübungen (DRA)
- Dissolved: 31 May 1945
- Type: Sports governing body
- Jurisdiction: Nazi Germany; Occupied Europe
- Headquarters: Reichssportfeld Berlin-Charlottenburg; 52°31′0″N 13°14′19″E
- Agency executives: Hans von Tschammer und Osten (1933–43), Reichssportführer; Arno Breitmeyer (1943–44); Karl Ritter von Halt (1944–45)
- Parent agency: Nazi Party

The National Socialist League of the Reich for Physical Exercise (German: Nationalsozialistischer Reichsbund für Leibesübungen, abbreviated NSRL) was the umbrella organization for sports and physical education in Nazi Germany. The NSRL was known as the German League of the Reich for Physical Exercise (German: Deutscher Reichsbund für Leibesübungen, abbreviated DRL) until 1938. The organization was expanded to Austria after that country's annexation by Nazi Germany.

The NSRL was led by the Reichssportführer, who after 1934 simultaneously presided over the German National Olympic Committee. The NSRL's leaders were Hans von Tschammer und Osten (1933–1943), Arno Breitmeyer (1943–1944) and Karl Ritter von Halt (1944–1945).

== History ==
=== Preliminary organizations: Effects of the Nazi takeover ===
The 1916 Summer Olympics had been awarded to Berlin, but were canceled because of the duration of World War I. The Deutscher Reichsausschuss für Olympische Spiele (DRA or DRAfOS) "German Imperial Commission for Olympic Games", was the German Olympic Sports organization at that time. In 1917 the "German Imperial Commission for Olympic Games" was renamed Deutscher Reichsausschuss für Leibesübungen (DRA, sometimes also DRL or, more rarely, DRAfL: "German Imperial Commission for Physical Exercise"). The name change reflected Germany's protest against the fact that Germany and other Central Powers were being excluded from the "Olympic family" which was dominated by the Entente Powers.

The Deutscher Reichsausschuss für Leibesübungen was led by Theodor Lewald and Carl Diem was its Secretary General. Even though it saw itself as the pan-German umbrella organization for sports, it did not represent all types of sports and sports associations of Germany. A great number of sport clubs, especially those stemming from industrial workers' background, had not joined the DRA.

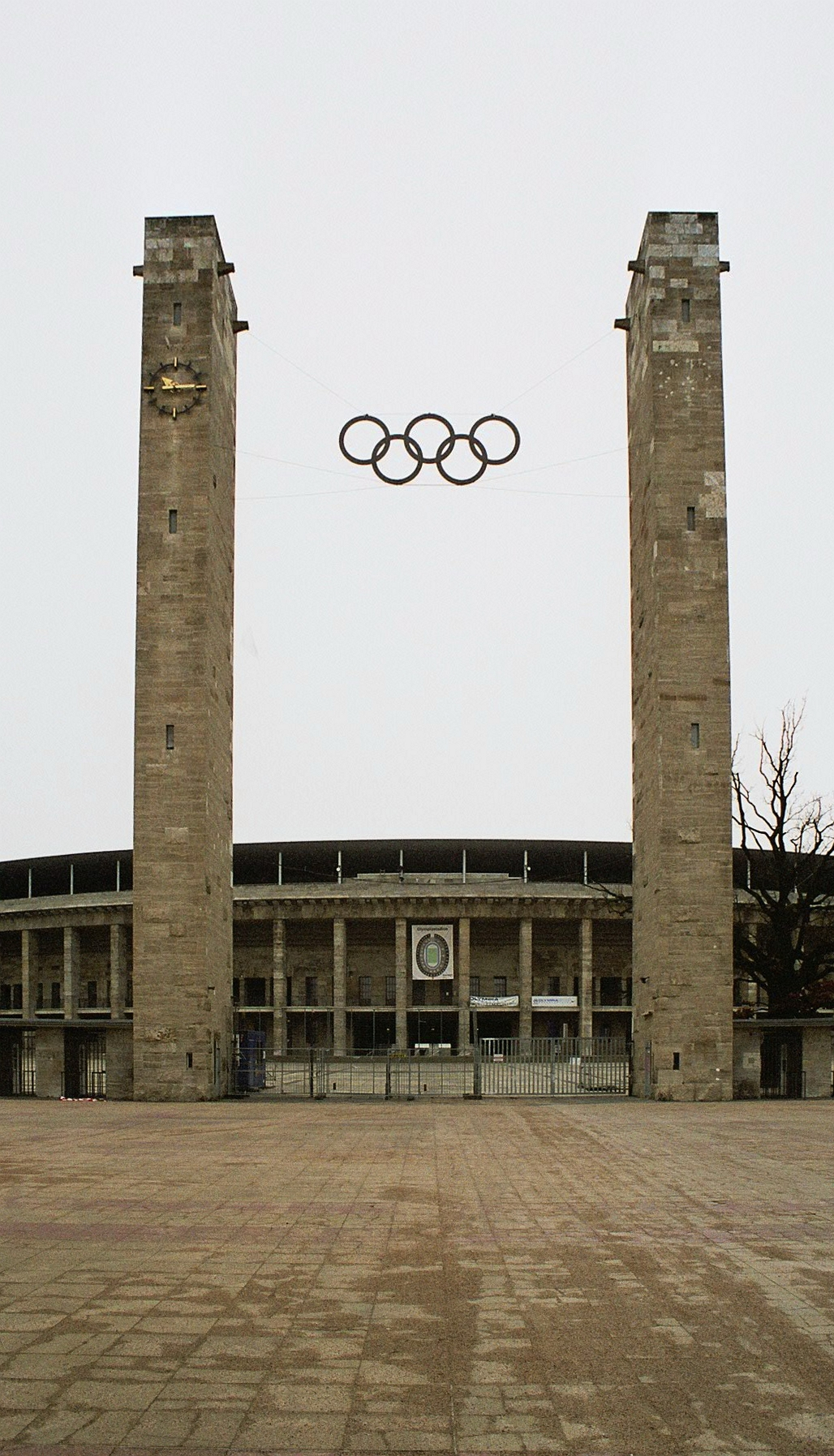
Berlin, gate of the Olympic Stadium

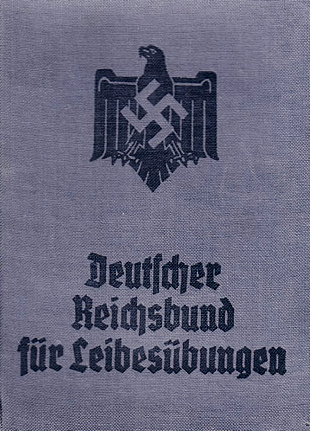
DRL membership booklet cover. The German eagle became the emblem of the DRL after the 1936 Olympic Games.

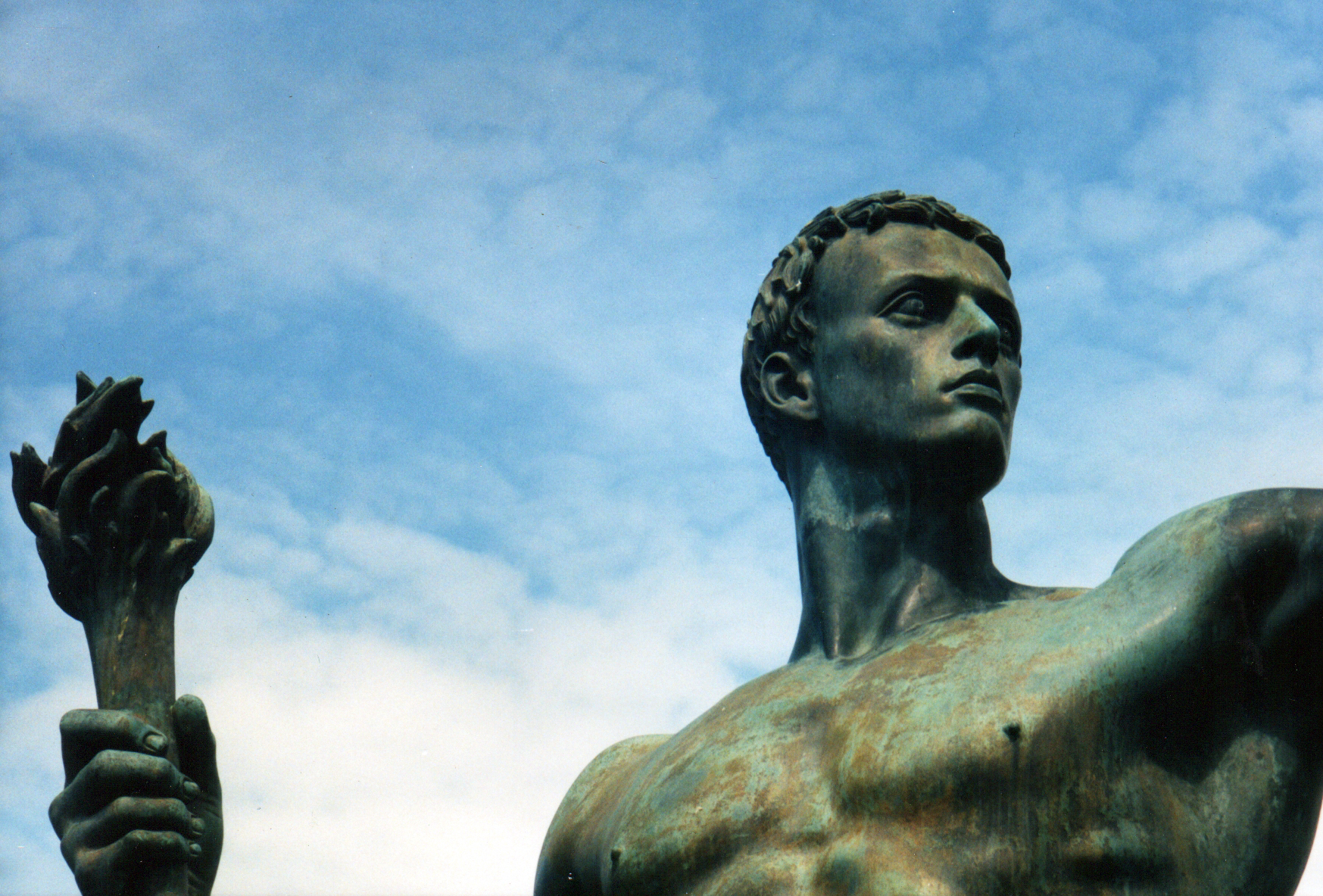
The idea of a "master race" was propagated along with the promotion of physical exercises to look after one's own body and to prepare oneself to be a warrior for the volk

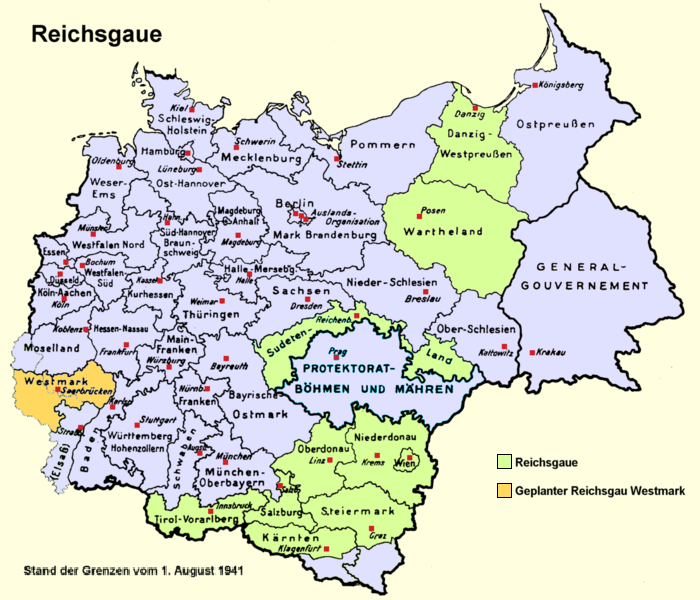
The Gaue of Greater Germany. As Nazi Germany expanded, the annexed territories of Austria and parts of Czechoslovakia came under the sphere of the NSRL

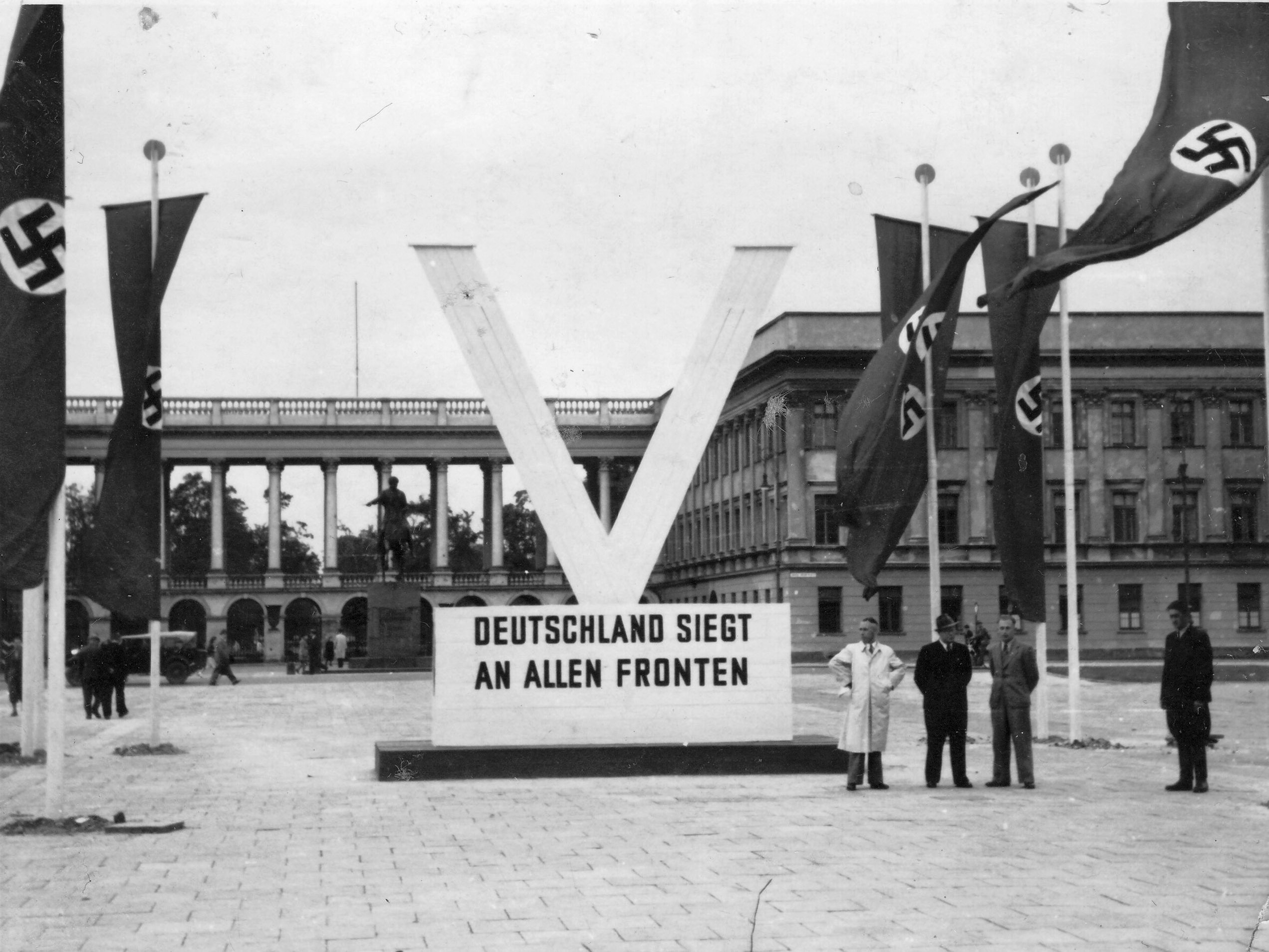
War propaganda: "Germany wins on all fronts." War-related triumphalism spelt doom for the once mighty NSRL

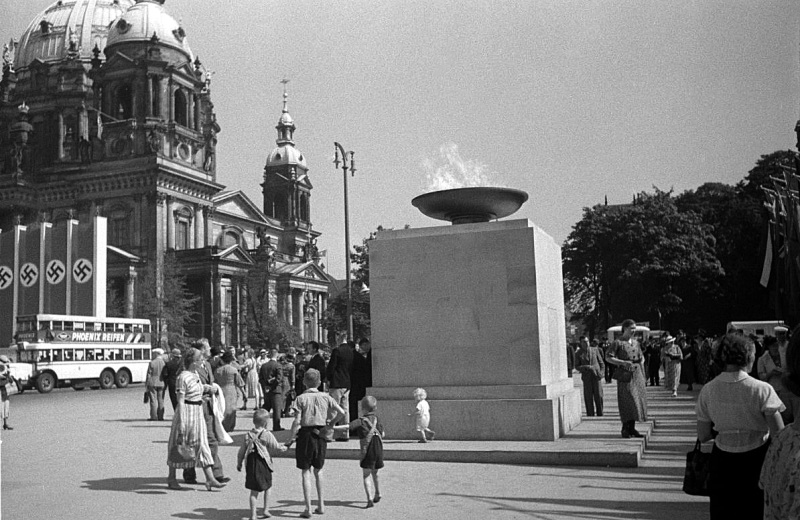
Many of the modern improvements of sports events by the DRL/NSRL are still in use. Carl Diem's idea: The Olympic fire in Berlin

After the Enabling Act, which legally gave Hitler dictatorial control of Germany in March 1933, all sports organizations connected to the Social Democratic Party, the Communist Party, and even to the church, were banned. This ban affected especially the sports clubs of industrial workers, most of which were called to split up on their own (Selbstauflösung) before the first semester of 1933 was over. The more conservative nationalistic and bourgeois clubs were allowed to subsist into the following year.

On 12 April 1933 Theodor Lewald gave in to the Nazi authorities and resigned as leader of the German Sports Office after it was revealed his paternal grandmother was Jewish. The Nazi minister of the interior, Wilhelm Frick, interfered with the process of the election of a new Sports leader, and the decision was made by a hurriedly instituted three-man commission. Thus, in April 1933, Hans von Tschammer und Osten, a figure formerly unknown in German sports, was named Reichskommissar für Turnen und Sport (Commissioner for Gymnastics and Sports of the Reich). Von Tschammer, however, would keep his predecessor in a high position in the sports body, and years later he would appoint Theodor Lewald as president of the Organizing Committee of the Berlin Olympic Games.

Hans von Tschammer und Osten was a SA group leader and promoter of Nazism. In the name of gleichschaltung he disbanded the Deutscher Reichsausschuss für Leibesübungen on 5 May 1933 (officially on 10 May). Von Tschammer was then elevated to Reichssportführer on 19 July and the whole sports sphere in Germany was placed under his power.

=== Sports and propaganda in Nazi Germany: The Aryan ideal ===
The Deutscher Reichsbund für Leibesübungen (DRL) was established on 27 July 1934 as the official Sports governing body of Nazi Germany. It would quickly become a formidable system within the German nation.

After the DRL's foundation all other German sport associations gradually lost their freedom and were coopted into the DRL as mere units ("Fachämter"). Even the most prestigious ones, like the German Football Association (DFB) lost their independence. Von Tschammer's goal was to build a formidable Nazi sports body to which all German sports associations would be submitted. His vision was that physical exercise would "improve the morale and productivity of German workers" as well as making sports a source of national pride for the Germans. Sporting skills were made a criterion for school graduation as well as a necessary qualification for certain jobs and admission to universities. Among the controversial measures taken by the Sports Office of the Reich at the time, the staging of the massive Reichssportfest event on Trinity Sunday was a decision that shocked devout Catholics.

In 1935 journalist Guido von Mengden, was named public relations officer of the Reich Sports Office. He became the personal advisor and consultant of the Reichssportführer in 1936, and subsequently became the chief editor of NS-Sport, the official organ of the Reich Sports Office. Other DRL/NSRL publications included Dietwart, a sports magazine with excellent illustrations and Sport und Staat (Sports and State), a massive four-volume Nazi propaganda report on the organized sports activities in Nazi Germany. Sport und Staat was made by Arno Breitmeyer and Hitler's personal photographer Heinrich Hoffmann. This lavishly illustrated work had many pictures and information about the various Nazi organizations, i.e. SA, NSKK, Bund Deutscher Mädel, Hitler Jugend, etc. Printed in 1934 by the publishing house of the German Sports Aid Funds, a branch of the DRL, only volume one and two of a planned series of four volumes were published.

The aims of the promotion of sports in Nazi Germany included hardening the spirit of every German as well as making German citizens feel that they were part of a wider national purpose. This was in line with the ideals of Friedrich Ludwig Jahn, the "Father of physical exercises", who connected the steeling of one's own body to a healthy spirit and promoted the idea of a unified, strong Germany. A more controversial aim was the demonstration of Aryan physical superiority.

Von Tschammer's impressively staged events of sports pageantry not only enhanced the physical activity, but also the nationalism of Germans. Nordic aesthetic beauty and commitment to Germanic ideals of race went hand in hand during the Nazi era, and von Tschammer und Osten implemented a policy of racial exclusion within sports. Athletes of Jewish origin were excluded from participation in relevant sporting events.

=== 1936 Olympic Games: Zenith of the Nazi Sports Office ===
In 1936 Hans von Tschammer und Osten, as the head of the Deutscher Reichsbund für Leibesübungen, played a major role in the structure and coordination of the Summer Olympics in Berlin. The Olympic Games, the first in history to have live television coverage, provided an ideal setting to showcase the Nazi regime and what Hitler deemed to be his exploits.

As Secretary General of the Organizing Committee of the Berlin Olympic Games, Carl Diem, the former secretary of the Deutscher Reichsausschuss für Leibesübungen (DRA), the forerunner of the DRL/NSRL, became the chief organizer of the Berlin Olympic Games. Diem held high posts in the Reichs Sports office even after the Olympics, being named leader of the Foreign Department of the Nationalsocialist Sports Office in 1939 by the Reichssportführer. As such Carl Diem was responsible for the issues of German athletes in foreign countries, as well as for the international affairs of the NSRL.

Von Tschammer trusted the organization of the Fourth Winter Olympics in Garmisch-Partenkirchen to Karl Ritter von Halt, whom he named President of the Committee for the organization of the Winter Games. As a result of the prestige acquired in this event, Karl Ritter von Halt would be elected member of the Executive Committee of the International Olympic Committee (IOC) in 1937, a post von Tschammer craved but was not able to obtain.

The German eagle with the swastika on the chest, worn as a badge by the athletes of the 1936 German Olympics team, became the official symbol of the Nazi Sports Body; "the swastika on the eagle's chest displays ... the ideology of the DRL" ("Das Hakenkreuz aber, welches der Adler in seinen Schwingen trägt, bekennt, aus welcher Gesinnung ... im DRL gearbeitet wird). The verbal salutation "Heil Hitler!" was introduced by von Tschammer on 12 December 1936 as the official formal salutation by members of German sport organisations in the sport events that would be organized from that date onwards. The Nazi salute had already been introduced three years before by Josef Klein. On 17 March 1937 all German athletes were called by Hans von Tschammer und Osten to join the Hitler Youth.

In 1937 two cricket (Germanized into "Kricket" by the DRL) matches between a German team and a British team from Worcester took place in Berlin.

=== Expansion of Germany: Beginning of the decline ===
Austria's annexation by Germany in March 1938 brought the budding Austrian Nationalliga to an early end. Numerous football teams were disbanded and some players fled the country. All Austrian sports associations were absorbed by the system of the DRL as Gau XVII section under Gaufachwart Hans Janisch. The Hitler salute was introduced as compulsory before and after every game. Finally, the operation of junior sports teams was handed over to the local Hitlerjugend units.

Despised by Nazis as unworthy of a true German, professionalism in sports was outlawed by the DRL in May 1938. Felix Linnemann, the German Football Association (DFB) president, was one of the greatest campaigners for amateurism in sports in Nazi Germany. In 1940, the already powerless German Football Association was finally wound up.

Following the 1938 Munich Agreement and the liquidation of Czechoslovakia as a state, the ethnic Sudeten German football teams played in the Gauliga Sudetenland. The NSRL formed two groups in 1939, which were raised to three in 1941. None of these teams were able to make it to the final stages of the German football champions. Czech clubs continued to play their own Bohemia/Moravia championship A separate Gauliga for the Czech teams of the territories occupied by Germany, Gauliga Böhmen und Mähren, was formed by the NSRL in 1943.

The last big sports event organized in its trademark grandiose style by the NSRL was the Deutsches Turn- und Sportfest (German Gym and Sports Celebration) in Breslau (now Wrocław) in July 1938. This highly nationalistic sports event commemorated the 125th anniversary of the German Wars of Liberation against Napoleon and the first award of the Iron Cross in the city of Breslau itself in 1813.

On 21 December 1938, Adolf Hitler issued a decree changing the name of the Reich Sports Body to Nationalsozialistischer Reichsbund für Leibesübungen (NSRL), thereby "elevating it to an organization served by the NSDAP". This name change meant that the NSRL would be "placed under" the Nazi Party. Its seat would be the Haus des Deutschen Sports (House of the German Sports) in the Reichssportfeld (Sports Field of the Reich) in Berlin.

=== Twilight and end of the Nazi Sports Office ===
Standard of a Gau of the NSRL

NSRL Hanging banner

World War II radically altered the role of the NSRL in Germany and the areas under its leadership. The military re-armament and dire war preparations would make the influence of physical exercises in Nazi German society wane in favour of militarism. The massive sports pageantry events in the large cities, carefully organized to arouse nationalistic fervor, were replaced by military parades of German warriors. Successful sportsmen found it increasingly difficult to compete with frontline war heroes in capturing the attention of the German public.

Even though the NSRL continued playing a big role in sporting activities among the youth for a few years, the atmosphere had changed. Many Germans were subjected to conscription and left for the different fronts, so the NSRL concentrated in training and staging local or regional events for younger athletes. Already in 1940 monetary funds for organizing sporting venues, such as the prestigious Kiel Week sailing competition, were not forthcoming. Contributors felt emboldened to deny funds to the formerly influential branches of the Nazi Sports Office owing to the war-related shifting of priorities. During this time the NSRL sold lottery tickets as a source of self-financement.

Von Tschammer's influence and power within the NSDAP also began rapidly eroding despite having been a committed topmost Nazi leader. He would, however, never witness Germany's defeat and humiliation in the war, for he died from pneumonia in Berlin in March 1943. Arno Breitmeyer, a fellow SA officer became the new Reichssportführer.

As the war dragged on, a huge number of members of the many branches of the NSRL, among them youth in their early teens, had to go to fight to the fronts. Since players were not available, except in shoddily organized military sports events in scattered frontline locations, sports life in Germany came practically to a standstill. The last von Tschammer und Osten Pokal football trophy was played in Vienna in 1943 and the following two years plunged the NSRL into irrelevance. The once mighty Nazi Sports Body had to give up its weight and its position of pride long before the war was lost.

On 31 May 1945, after Nazi Germany's defeat in World War II, the American Military Government issued a special law outlawing the Nazi party and all of its branches. Known as "Law number five", this Denazification decree disbanded the NS Reichsbund für Leibesübungen along with all its facilities and departments.

The disbandment of the NSRL meant that all the sports organizations of Germany had to be established anew during the postwar reconstruction of both West Germany and East Germany. Even after German reunification in 1990, there has never been such a powerful and all-encompassing sports organization in Germany as the DRL/NSRL was at its height.

== Structure ==
As a sports governing body seeking to control and integrate all sport activities in Germany, the DRL/NSRL provided a highly organized structure. This structure was imbued with nationalistic significance, keeping in line with the Nazi Party's goal of reminding Germans of the extent of the nation. According to Paragraph 2 of the DRL's Statutes: The purpose of the League of the Reich for Physical Exercise is the training of the body and character of Germans grouped together in member organizations through planned physical exercises and care of the national conscience (Volksbewußtsein) in the spirit of the National Socialist state.

As to its purpose and method, the well-ordered DRL/NSRL system proved highly effective. The 1936 Summer Olympics, as well as other key events, provided ample opportunities to test the good organization that the Sports Body of the Reich was able to provide. The NSRL's competence succeeded in instilling a spirit of unity and pride among the German sportsmen and women as well as their supporters. Moreover, even if not duly credited, many of the NSRL's systemic improvements in sports are still in use in today's sports organizations.

=== By Sport ===
- Department 1: Artistic gymnastics, Gymnastics and Summer Games (1)
- Department 2: Football, Rugby, and Cricket
- Department 3: Light athletics
- Department 4: Handball
- Department 5: Swimming
- Department 6: Heavy athletics (Weightlifting)
- Department 7: Boxing
- Department 8: Fencing
- Department 9: Hockey?
- Department 10: Tennis
- Department 11: Rowing
- Department 12: Canoeing
- Department 13: Ice- and Rollerskating
- Department 14: Skiing
- Department 15: Deutscher Radfahrer-Verband, Bicycling

Besides the departments above, certain competences of the NSRL as a league were served by sports federations some of which still exist:

- 16. Deutscher Segler-Verband (Sailing)
- 17. Deutscher Bergsteiger-Verband (Mountaineering)
- 18. Deutscher Wanderverband (Hiking)
- 19. Deutscher Kegler-Bund (Bowling)
- 20. Deutscher Schützen-Verband (Shooting)
- 21. Deutscher Golf-Verband (Golf)
- 22. Deutscher Bob- und Schlittensport-Verband (Bobsleigh, Luge and Skeleton)
- 23. Deutscher Tisch-Tennis-Bund (Table-tennis)
- 24. Deutscher Amateur-Billiard-Verband (Billiard)

(1) The "Summer Games" include the following games known collectively as "Turnspiele" in German: Schlagball (a German bat-and-ball sport), Fistball, Korbball (closely related to korfball), Schleuderball and Ringtennis.

=== By region ===
The regional structure of the NSRL followed the Nazi Party model. Often two or more gaue were included in one region where it was expedient to do so.

- Region 1: East Prussia
- Region 2: Pomerania
- Region 3: Berlin-Brandenburg
- Region 4: Silesia
- Region 5: Saxony
- Region 6: Mitte (1)
- Region 7: Nordmark (2)
- Region 8: Lower Saxony
- Region 9: Westphalia
- Region 10: Lower Rhine
- Region 11: Middle Rhine
- Region 12: Hessen
- Region 13: Southwest (3)
- Region 14: Baden
- Region 14a: Alsace
- Region 15: Württemberg-Hohenzollern
- Region 16: Bavaria
- Region 17: Ostmark (4)
- Region 18: Sudetenland
- Region 19: Danzig-West Prussia
- Gau Wartheland

(1) Thuringia, Anhalt and the Province of Saxony. — (2) Schleswig-Holstein, Hamburg and Mecklenburg. — (3) The Palatinate and (from 1935 onwards) the Saar Region. — (4) Austria from 1938 onwards.

=== Distribution of members ===
By 1 January 1937 the Nationalsozialistischer Reichsbund für Leibesübungen had 45,096 Associations with 3,582,776 active members (of whom 517,992 were female and 3,064,784 male). On 1 April 1939 there were 44,622 Associations with 3,668,206 active members (of whom 526,084 were female). The sports practiced were the following:

Sport	Associations /Sections	Total practising	Total female
1. Artistic gymnastics	12,773	662,567	234,190
2. Football	10,928	483,302	0
2. Rugby	52	1,925	0
2. Cricket	6	88	0
3. Light athletics	7,366	268,183	58,817
4. Handball	4,774	152,943	14,229
4. Basketball	156	3,396	522
5. Swimming	2,643	129,142	41,482
6. Weightlifting	809	12,777	0
6. Wrestling	748	15,263	0
6. Jiu-Jitsu	220	7,957	68
7. Boxing	872	17,904	0
8. Fencing	548	9,088	2,505
9. Hockey	411	20,446	5,748
10. Tennis	1,840	79,932	40,361
11. Rowing	757	49,942	11,433
12. Canoeing	1,155	45,652	8,183
13. Ice Skating	369	13,944	4,907
13. Rollerskating	142	4,409	2,364
14. Skiing	2,099	88,395	26,793
15. Bicycling	2,951	61,131	5,093
16. Sailing	460	19,069	832
17. Mountaineering	510	168,450	28,536
18. Hiking	2,961	198,346	30,683
19. Bowling	1,049	50,325	2,848
20. Shooting	14,310	418,404	2,730
21. Golf	59	3,953	1,401
22. Bobsleigh	21	311	29
22. Luge and Skeleton	67	2,197	682
23. Table tennis	777	15,810	3,937
24. Billiards	246	5,046	67

Numbering according to Departments and Departmental Federations.

== Events ==
Championships in the individual types of sports were organized by the corresponding associations and federations. Among the events directly organized by the NS Reichsbund für Leibesübungen the most important were:

- The 4th Deutsche Kampfspiele, 23–29 July 1934, in Nürnberg
- Deutsches Turn- und Sportfest, 26–31 July 1938, in Breslau

== Trophy names ==
- The name of today's DFB-Pokal, (Deutscher Fußball-Bund-Pokal or German Football-Federation Cup), first contested in the 1934–35 season, was known between 1935 and 1943 as Tschammer-Pokal after then "Reichssportführer" (Sports Chief of the Reich) Hans von Tschammer und Osten.
- The amateur Länderpokal (DFB), first established in 1909, was known between 1935 and 1942 as Reichsbundpokal.

== See also ==
- 1936 Summer Olympics
- 1936 Winter Olympics
- The Death Match
- Deutscher Olympischer Sportbund
- Gauliga
- Hitler Youth
- Yacht-Club von Deutschland

== Notes and references ==
- Schlag nach! Wissenswerte Tatsachen aus allen Gebieten. Bibliographisches Institut, Leipzig, 1st ed. 1938 (German version reference)
- Schlag nach! Wissenswerte Tatsachen aus allen Gebieten. Bibliographisches Institut, Leipzig, 3d ed. 1941 (German version reference)
