= Erwin Busta =

Austrian SS-Hauptscharführer and concentration camp functionary

Erwin Julius Busta (April 12, 1905 – December 27, 1982) was an Austrian SS-Hauptscharführer, concentration camp functionary and convicted war criminal. During World War II Busta was also closely associated with the German V-weapons program; serving on the SS staff at the Peenemünde Army Research Center, the V-2 rocket production facility at Mittelwerk and the Mittelbau-Dora concentration camp. He was convicted of war crimes by a West German court in 1970.

== Early life and Nazi involvement ==
Erwin Busta was born in the city of Leoben, Austria (then part of the Austro-Hungarian Empire) on April 12, 1905, and originally worked as a mason and carpenter. He joined both the Austrian Nazi Party and the Sturmabteilung (SA) in 1928 and became a member of the Schutzstaffel (SS) in 1930. In July, 1933 the Nazi Party was officially banned in Austria by the government of Engelbert Dollfuss. Busta moved to Augsburg, Germany shortly afterward where he became a member of the Austrian Legion, a paramilitary group composed of pro-Nazi Austrian expatriates. He underwent military and police-training and, in 1934, was recruited into the newly established SS-Totenkopfverbände.

Busta initially served as a guard at the Esterwegen concentration camp and was later transferred to Dachau in April 1936, where he headed the main detention area, and then to Sachsenhausen in 1942. In the summer of 1943 Busta was reassigned to the Peenemünde Army Research Center, the main research and testing site for Germany's V-weapons program. This location was also home to a small concentration camp whose inmates (mostly Soviet and Polish POWs) were employed as slave-laborers. During his time at Peenemünde, Busta worked as a Lagerführer (camp leader) of the camp's central warehouse; supervising the prisoner-laborers as they performed various tasks ranging from construction work to the actual production of V-2 ballistic missiles.

== Mittelbau-Dora ==
Following the bombing of Peenemünde by the RAF in August, 1943 the entire V-weapons program was relocated by the German government to the Nordhausen-area of central Germany. This transition included much of the former staff of Peenemünde, Busta among them. Production of the V-2's was reestablished at Mittelwerk, a massive armaments facility housed in an elaborate tunnel system in the Kohnstein. Here again, slave-labor was utilized to assemble the rockets. The tunnels at Mittelwerk were staffed by thousands of prisoner-laborers drawn from the inmate population of the nearby Mittelbau-Dora concentration camp. Their work was overseen by both German civilian contractors and the SS.

Beginning in the autumn of 1943 Busta was employed in both areas of the camp; working as a Blockführer (block leader) in Dora while also serving as the chief SS warden at Mittelwerk. Busta was a much-feared figure among the prisoner-laborers in the tunnels and developed a reputation for harshness and brutality. Busta was known to have inmates suspected of sabotage shot or hanged by the SS on a regular basis. In March, 1945 Busta oversaw the mass-hanging of several dozen Russian prisoners who had attempted to escape. When Dora and Mittelwerk were evacuated in April, 1945 Busta commanded a transport of hundreds of prisoners to the Ebensee concentration camp in his native Austria.

== Post-war ==
After the end of World War II in May, 1945 Busta lived under an alias and moved regularly between Germany and Austria. He was thus able to avoid appearing as a defendant at the 1947 Dora war crimes trial. He settled permanently in West Germany in 1952 and resumed using his real name. In November 1967, he was one of three former SS staff members of Mittelbau-Dora indicted for war crimes by the district court of Essen. Busta entered a plea of not guilty to the charges that he had mistreated and murdered prisoners during his time at Mittelwerk. Busta was found guilty and sentenced to 8 years and a half years in prison on May 8, 1970. However, he never served his sentence owing to reasons of ill-health. Busta died in Munich on 27. December 1982.
