= Hans Möser =

German SS functionary (1906–1948)

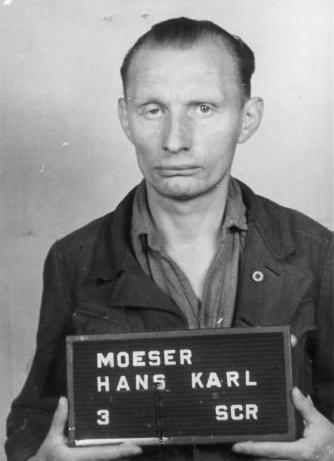
- Hans Möser in US custody, 1947
- Born: April 7, 1906; Darmstadt, German Empire
- Died: November 26, 1948 (aged 42); Landsberg Prison, Landsberg am Lech, Allied-occupied Germany
- Cause of death: Execution by hanging
- Military career
- Allegiance: Nazi Germany
- Branch: Schutzstaffel
- Rank: Obersturmführer
- Unit: SS-Totenkopfverbände

Hans Karl Moeser (April 7, 1906 – November 26, 1948) was a German SS functionary during the Nazi era who served at the Neuengamme, Auschwitz and Mittelbau-Dora concentration camps. He was captured at the end of the war and tried by the United States Military Government Court. The only one among 19 defendants at the Dora Trial sentenced to death, Möser was executed at Landsberg Prison in 1948.

== SS career ==
Möser was born in Darmstadt, Germany. A merchant by trade, he joined the Nazi Party in October 1929 (Member No. 155301) and the SS in July 1931 (Member No. 9555). In July 1940 Möser joined the staff at the newly opened SS-Hinzert concentration camp, infamous for its brutality, and later he transferred to Neuengamme. From May 1943 until October 1943 he was posted to the Auschwitz III Monowitz concentration camp as Kompanieführer of the Wachbataillon (Guard Battalion) in IG Farben's "Buna" plant. By the end of April 1944 he was also Kompanieführer of the Men on Watch at the Auschwitz I main camp (German: Stammlager).

He transferred to the Dora central camp on May 1, 1944, initially serving as Deputy Protective Custody Camp Leader (German: Schutzhaftlagerführer) and then in July promoted to First Protective Custody Camp Leader. Here he was to commit the atrocities that would lead to his later trial and execution. During hangings of prisoners, for instance, he sometimes had the ropes cut while the victims were still alive so as to prolong their suffering. In February, 1945, as the Red Army overran German positions on the Eastern Front, the SS headquarters personnel at Auschwitz evacuated to Mittelbau-Dora. Auschwitz commander Richard Baer and his staff took over the Dora complex and Möser was again made Deputy Leader, this time under Franz Hössler.

On April 5, 1945, as American 3rd Armored Division closed in on Mittelbau-Dora, Möser led a forced evacuation of over 3,000 prisoners to the railhead for transfer to Neuengamme. Due to the wartime situation the train was diverted to Ravensbrück concentration camp instead. The prisoners were then led on a death march for the last stage of their journey.

== Trial, conviction and execution ==
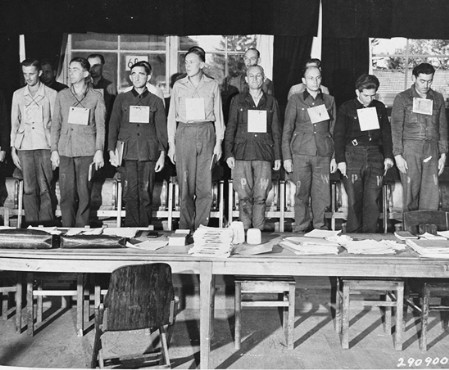
The Dora defendants, Hans Möser 3rd from the right

Möser was arrested at the end of the war. Following the June 1945 Fedden Mission investigation of the Dora conditions, Möser was among 19 defendants tried by the American General Military Government Court in the Dora Trial (The United States of America versus Arthur Kurt Andrae et al., Case Number 000-50-37), part of the Dachau Trials. Proceedings began on July 7, 1947 and lasted until December 30. Möser was found to have been present at hangings and personally shooting prisoners execution-style during escape attempts. The responsibility for the death marches during the final evacuation of Dora were also attributed to Möser. In his trial statement he said:

The same way, with the same pleasure, as you shoot deer, I shot a human being. When I came to the SS and had to shoot the first three persons, my food didn't taste good for three days, but today it is a pleasure. It is a joy for me."

Found guilty, he was the only defendant in the Dora Trial sentenced to death. Following appeals, Möser was executed by hanging at Landsberg Prison on November 26, 1948.
