= Wilhelm Simon =

German SS-Hauptscharführer and concentration camp functionary

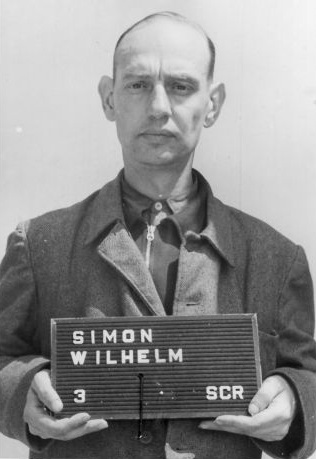
- Simon in U.S. custody (1947)
- Born: 23 April 1900; Elberfeld, German Empire
- Died: 27 September 1971 (aged 71); Bochum, West Germany
- Military career
- Allegiance: Nazi Germany
- Branch: Schutzstaffel
- Rank: SS-Hauptscharführer
- Nickname: "Simon Legree"
- Unit: SS-Totenkopfverbände
- Conflicts: World War II

Wilhelm Simon (23 April 1900 – 27 September 1971) was a German SS-Hauptscharführer and concentration camp functionary. During World War II he held various administrative posts at Buchenwald and Mittelbau-Dora. He was convicted of war crimes by the United States during the Dachau-Dora trial in 1947.

== Biography ==
Wilhelm Simon was born in Elberfeld on 23 April 1900. Between 1919 and 1935 he was employed as a clerk in a textile mill. Simon became a member of both the Nazi Party and the Schutzstaffel (SS) in August 1932 and served as head of the Accounting Department for the Medical Association of the Rhineland from 1935 to 1939. Following the outbreak of World War II he was assigned to the district branch of the Reich Ministry of Food and Agriculture in Wuppertal.

In January 1941 Simon was placed on active duty by the SS and assigned to the SS-Totenkopfverbände. He was subsequently posted to the Buchenwald concentration camp as a member of its guard battalion. Simon rose in the camp administration and was promoted to the position of Assistant Labor Allocation Manager for Buchenwald in the summer of 1942. In this capacity, Simon both organized and directly supervised the provision of camp inmates as slave-laborers for various industries vital to the German war economy.

== Mittelbau-Dora ==
In December 1943 Simon was appointed Arbeitsdienstführer (Labor Service Leader) for the newly established Mittelbau-Dora concentration camp. As camp Labor Leader he managed the large-scale assignment of the camp's prisoners to various forced labor details in the vast and subterranean Mittelwerk armaments facility, where they performed much of the dangerous construction and assembly work required to produce Germany's V-2 ballistic missiles. Among other things, Simon was responsible for the introduction of a bonus system used to reward productive prisoner laborers with special privileges and also accompanied the eminent German rocket-scientist Wernher von Braun on a trip to Buchenwald to select prisoners there for work at Dora.

During his service as Labor Leader at Mittelbau-Dora Simon developed a reputation for extreme brutality among the inmates of the camp, who gave him the nickname "Simon Legree" after the character of the cruel slave-master in the book "Uncle Tom’s Cabin". In one particular incident during the summer of 1944 Simon was reported to have assigned a group of severely malnourished Hungarian Jews, who had recently arrived on a transport from Auschwitz, the grueling task of building their own barracks. The order would result in numerous deaths from exhaustion among the already badly-ailing Jews. Afterward, Simon ordered the SS to bludgeon to death several children from the same transport before dispatching the survivors into the tunnels at Mittelwerk.

Mittelbau-Dora was evacuated shortly before the arrival of American troops in April 1945. During the evacuation, Simon led a transport of 350 prisoners to the Ebensee concentration camp in Austria. Immediately following his arrival at Ebensee, Simon was drafted into a local Wehrmacht unit. He surrendered to American forces on 8 May 1945 but managed to escape from captivity the following day. Simon was later identified as an alleged war criminal and was arrested a second time by US occupation authorities. He stood trial as a defendant in the Dachau-Dora war crimes trial, staged by the Office of the US Military Government (OMGUS) in 1947. Simon pleaded not guilty to all charges. He was, however, convicted of war crimes on 30 December 1947 and sentenced to life imprisonment and interned in Landsberg Prison.

Simon was released from prison in 1954. He returned to his native Ruhr district, where he worked as a salesman. He died in obscurity in Bochum, West Germany on 27 September 1971.
