= Heinrich Schmidt (SS doctor) =

Nazi concentration camp doctor (1912–2000)

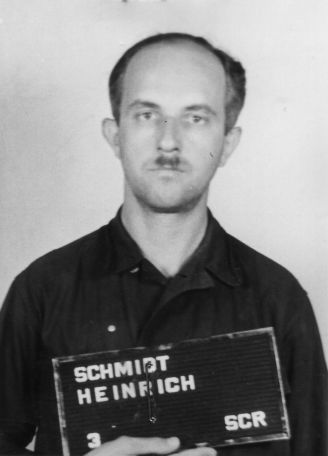
Heinrich Schmidt as defendant, June, 1947

Ernst Heinrich Schmidt (27 March 1912 – 28 November 2000) was a German physician and member of the SS, who practised Nazi medicine in a variety of German concentration camps during World War II. He was tried in 1947 and 1975 for complicity in war crimes, but was acquitted both times.

== Biography ==
Schmidt was born in Altenburg, Germany. In 1937, while studying at the University of Leipzig to become a medical doctor, he joined the Nazi Party (Member No. 555,294) and the SS (Member No. 23,069). At the outbreak of World War II, Schmidt was first assigned to a Waffen-SS military hospital.

In 1941, Schmidt became a camp physician at the Buchenwald concentration camp and then transferred from there to Majdanek concentration camp in June 1942. In October 1943, Schmidt was First Camp Physician at the Gross-Rosen concentration camp and then at Dachau concentration camp in September 1944. Between March 1945 and early April 1945, Schmidt served as camp physician in the Boelke Kaserne subcamp of Mittelbau-Dora in Nordhausen. Near the end of World War II, in the course of the evacuation of staff and prisoners from the Mittelbau, Schmidt wound up at Bergen-Belsen concentration camp on 8 or 9 April 1945.

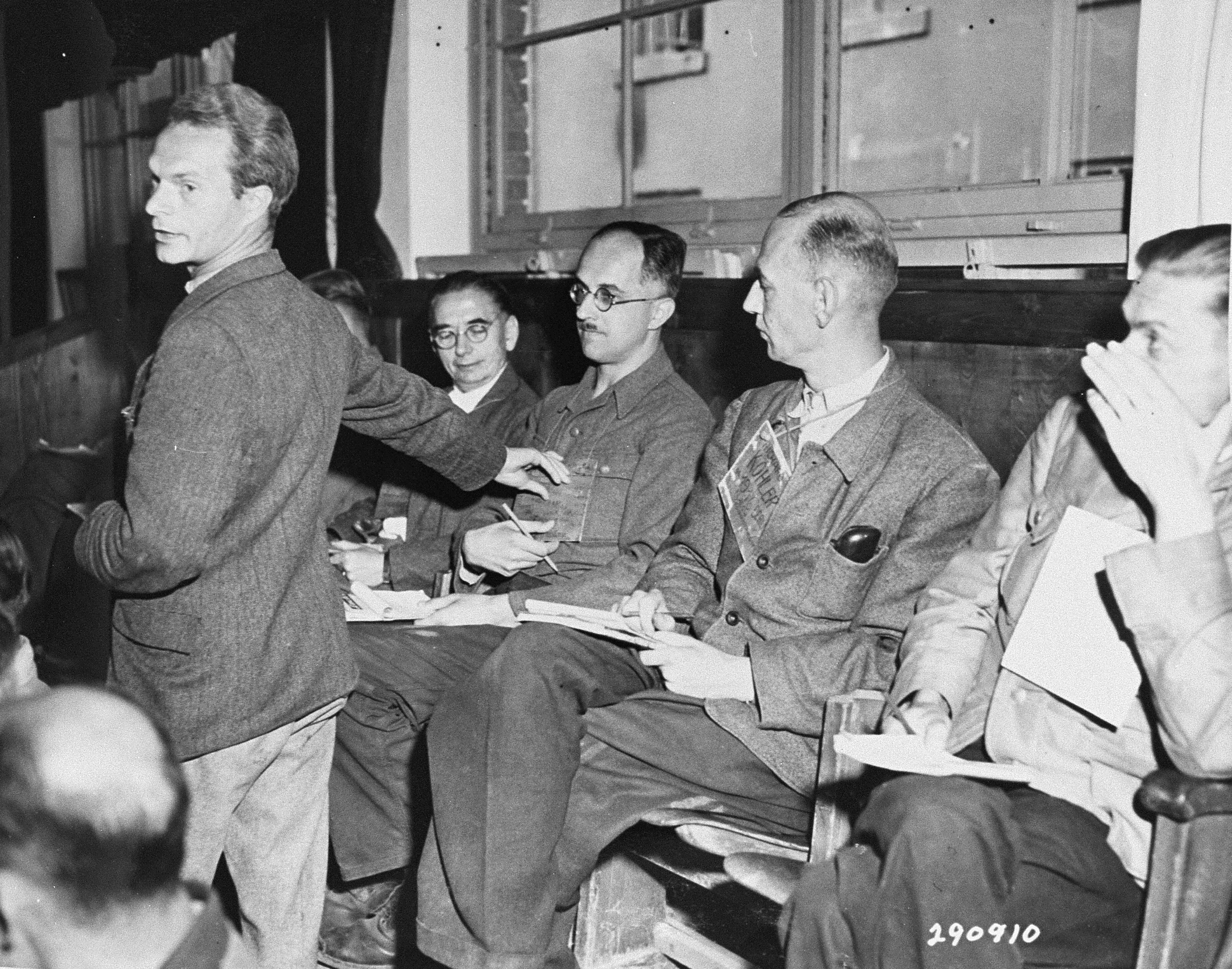
Vans Maienschein, a prosecution witness, points out former camp doctor Heinrich Schmidt at the Dora Trial. 18 September 1947.

On 15 April 1945 Belsen was liberated by members of the British Army. Schmidt and Alfred Kurzke testified as witness in the Belsen Trial on 25 October 1945. At this time, he was serving as senior doctor in the Bergen-Belsen displaced persons camp set up by the Allies. He was later arrested and indicted for war crimes in the Dora Trial, which took place in the context of the Dachau Trials between 7 August and 30 December 1947. Schmidt was accused of allowing inmates to die by withholding medical care. He was acquitted for lack of evidence.

Schmidt was again indicted and stood trial at the District Court of Düsseldorf for war crimes committed at Majdanek concentration camp. The third Majdanek Trial (Majdanek-Prozess in German) began on 26 November 1975, and lasted 474 sessions, Germany's longest and most expensive trial. All the defendants had been SS staff at Majdanek. Schmidt was accused of at least eight murders through his participation in the selections for the gas chambers. Due to a lack of evidence, Schmidt was acquitted on 20 March 1979, and released on 19 April 1979.

From 1985, Schmidt lived in Uetze, Germany. He died in Celle in 2000.

== Bibliography ==
- Klee, Ernst (1997). Auschwitz, Nazi Medicine and Their Victims (3rd ed.). Frankfurt am Main: S. Fischer. ISBN 3-596-14906-1.
- Klee, Ernst (2007). Das Personenlexikon zum Dritten Reich: Wer war was vor und nach 1945 [The Encyclopedia of Persons in the Third Reich: Who was Who Before and After 1945]. Frankfurt am Main: S. Fischer. ISBN 978-3-596-16048-8.
