= Dora trial =

War crimes trial

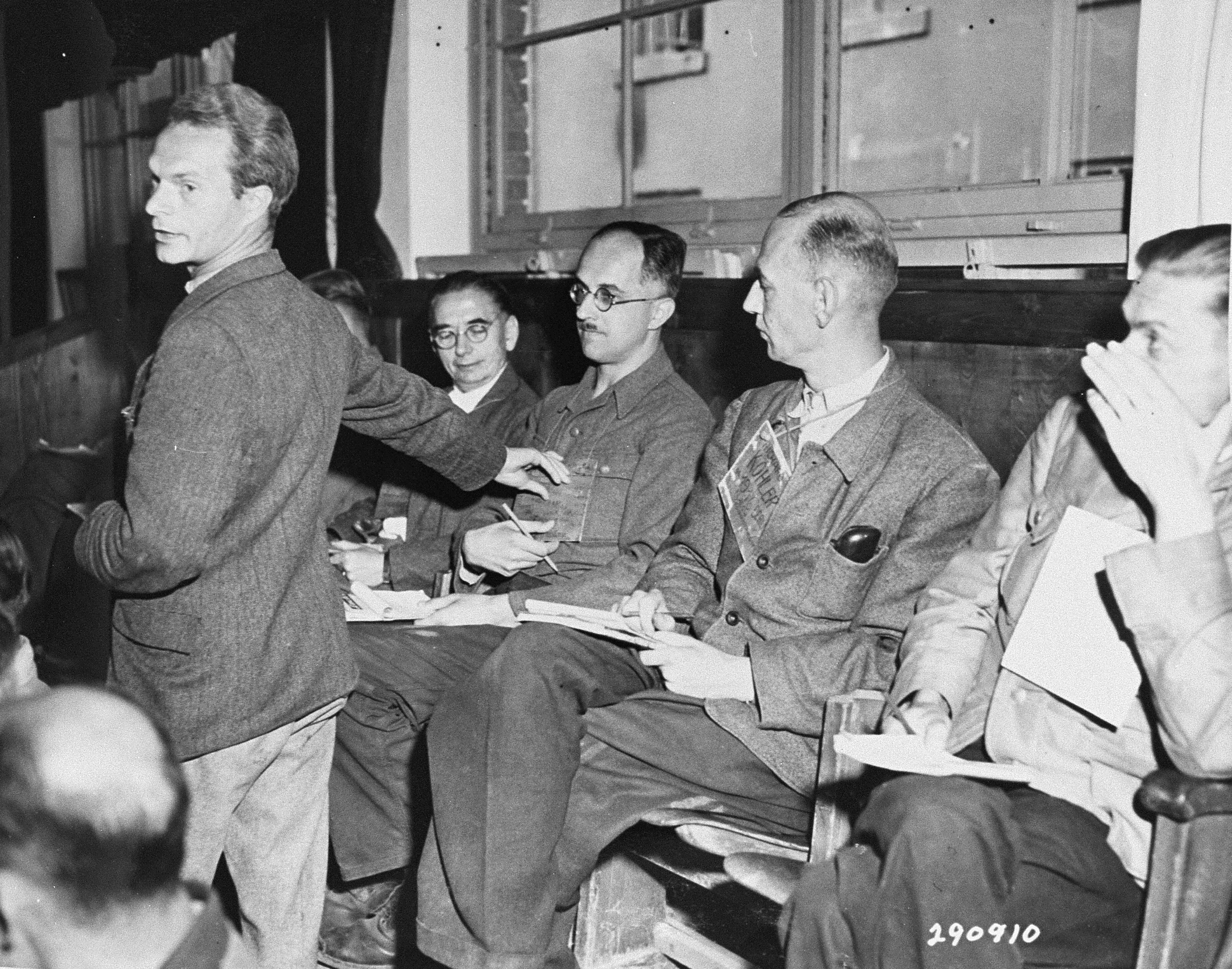
Vans Maienschein, a prosecution witness, points out former camp doctor Heinrich Schmidt as the man who let patients die because of lack of medical care. September, 1947

The Dora Trial, also the "Dora"-Nordhausen or Dachau Dora Proceeding (German: Dachau-Dora Prozess) was a war crimes trial conducted by the United States Army in the aftermath of the collapse of the Third Reich. It took place between August 7 and December 30, 1947, on the site of the former Dachau concentration camp, Germany.

In the proceedings, officially known as the United States of America vs. Kurt Andrae et al. (Case 000-50-37), 19 men were accused of war crimes committed in the operation of the Mittelbau-Dora concentration camp, its many subcamps, and the Mittelwerk armaments plant located near Nordhausen, Germany. The main trial ended with 4 acquittals and 15 convictions, including 1 death sentence. Dora was the last of a sequence of proceedings which took place in the context of the Dachau Trials relating to wide-ranging war crimes uncovered by the United States in its zone of occupation at the end of World War II. Those convicted in the Dora Trial served their sentences at Landsberg Prison.

Additional Dora-related proceedings were held both during and after the Dora Trial. Between late-October and mid-December 1947, short trials were held against 14 lower-level defendants, mostly SS-TV Guards. These resulted in 4 convictions and 1 acquittal, with the remaining 9 cases dropped for lack of evidence or available witnesses. Violent crimes still extant in the body of the facts resulted in several more trials of individual cases in both West Germany and East Germany. The most public and important occurred in Essen between 1968 and 1970, resulting in 2 convictions.

== Background ==
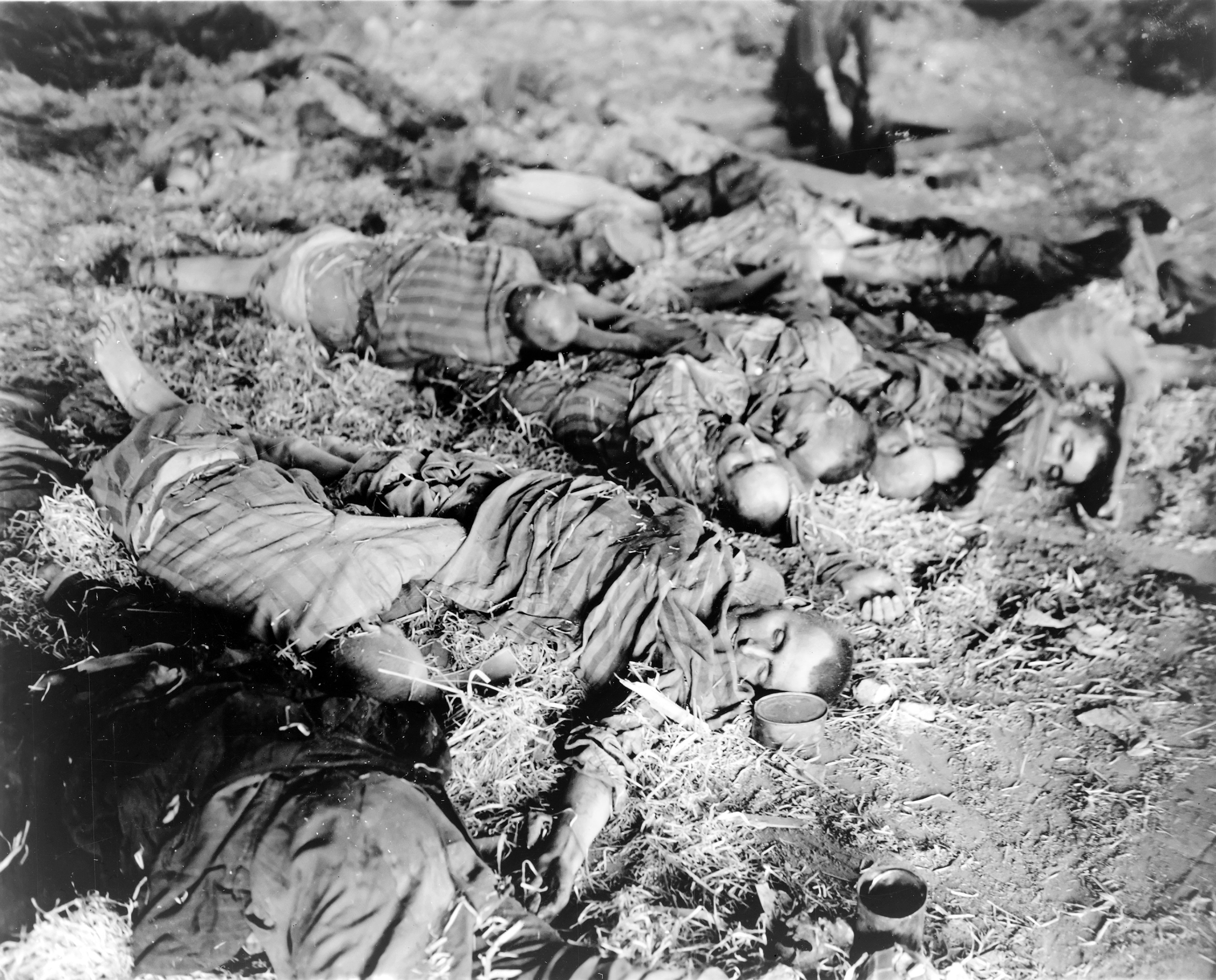
Dead prisoners discovered after the liberation of the camp complex by members of the United States Army Signal Corps, April 11, 1945

Of the more than 60,000 prisoners who passed through the Mittelbau-Dora concentration camp complex, with its catastrophic working and living conditions, at least 20,000 died of hunger, exposure, disease and abuse. When American troops reached Mittelbau on 11 April 1945, they found nearly 2,000 dead bodies. Only several hundred prisoners were found alive, mostly sick or dying, as the Mittelbau and its sub-camps had already been forcibly evacuated by the SS-Totenkopfverbände on April 6, 1945.

During the "evacuation", approximately 36,500 prisoners were sent on death marches and over 8,000 died from starvation, exposure and summary executions. In one infamous example, about 400 prisoners led by Erhard Brauny left the Rottleberode subcamp on 4 April 1945 in a plan to move them to Neuengamme concentration camp, which was still operational. When the transport reached the town of Gardelegen, the prisoners were joined by additional "evacuation transports". The prisoners, now numbering over 1000, could be moved no further due to damaged railway lines. There they were simply murdered by their captors at Isenschnibber Barn on 13 April 1945.

Investigating Team 6822, part of the U.S. War Crimes Program to create legal standards and judicial systems to prosecute Nazi crimes, quickly began to identify the perpetrators. By May 25, 1945, the investigations were complete and a report was sent to General Simpson, Supreme Commander of United States 9th Army. Many of the suspects were quickly captured and interned. Recorded testimony and photographic evidence formed the basis of the indictments. The process became complicated after the withdrawal of American forces from Thuringia on July 1, 1945, when the Mittelbau-Dora complex wound up in the Soviet occupation zone. On September 3, 1946, an exchange of detainees and evidence failed, as no Soviet military representatives appeared at a previously agreed meeting point on the frontier. Corresponding demands to the Soviet military administration remained mostly unanswered. Why Soviet authorities did not cooperate on Dora was unclear, since evidence presented to them on the Gardelegen Massacre resulted in the transfer of 22 suspects. The notebook of an American investigator indicates the possibility that due to unclear responsibilities among the Soviet investigators and their managers, they could not make a decision. Those Mittelbau-Dora suspects and evidence that were in U.S. custody were finally incorporated into the framework of the Dachau Trials.

Prior to the start of the Dora Trial, 12 former members of the SS administration at Mittelbau-Dora had already been convicted of war crimes under British military jurisdiction in the Belsen Trial. There, 4 defendants were sentenced to imprisonment and 5 acquitted. Protective Custody Camp Leader Franz Hößler, commander of the Kleinbodungen subcamp Franz Stofel and his deputy Wilhelm Dörr were all sentenced to death and executed by hanging on 13 December 1945 in Hamelin prison. Josef Kollmer, the commander of Dora's SS guard battalion from October, 1943 to May, 1944, was executed in Kraków on January 28, 1948, following his conviction by Poland's Supreme National Tribunal in the First Auschwitz Trial. Former camp commandant Otto Förschner was executed by U.S. military authorities at Landsberg Prison on May 28, 1946, following his conviction for war crimes that occurred during his tenure as commander of the Dachau subcamp of Kaufering. His successor, former Auschwitz commandant Richard Baer was arrested by West German authorities in 1960, but died of natural causes in 1963, before he was able to appear as a defendant in the Frankfurt Auschwitz Trials. Helmut Bischoff, SS security chief for the V-weapons program and commander of the Sicherheitsdienst (SD) detachment in Mittelbau-Dora, was arrested by Soviet occupation forces in January, 1946 and held in military detention in East Germany, and later Siberia, until 1955. Karl Kahr, the former SS Camp Physician, was not charged due to his relatively good reputation among the prisoners. He became a witness for the prosecution in the Dora Trial.

== Legal basis and indictment ==
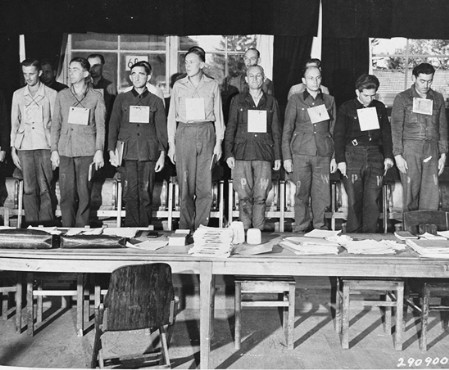
16 of the 19 defendants on 19 September 1947

The legal basis of the proceedings was established in March 1947 with the adoption of the Legal and Penal Administration under the Office of Military Government for Germany (OMGUS). The indictment, which was served on the defendants on 20 June 1947, consisted of two main charges brought together under the title "Violation of the Customs and Laws of War". The content of the application covered war crimes committed in the operation of Mittelbau-Dora and its subcamps from 1 June 1943 to 8 May 1945 upon non-German civilians and prisoners of war. This was a decisive change from other Dachau Trials, because it now covered not only war crimes committed against Allied nationals, but also against stateless persons, Austrians, Slovaks and Italians. German perpetrators of crimes on German victims remained long unpunished and were usually only later heard in German courts.

All the defendants were charged in a Common Design of unlawfully and intentionally participating in abuses and killings of prisoners of war and non-German civilians. By the institution of the Common Design approach, specific criminal offenses did not have to be proven individually; rather, by participation in the operation of a concentration camp and membership in the criminal organization of the SS, a war crime had already been committed. The degree of individual responsibility in the Common Design was determined by acts of excess and rank of the accused. This also influenced the verdict and degree of punishment.

== Participants ==
=== Judges ===
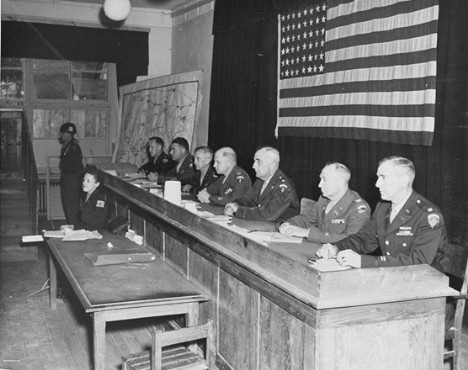
American Military Tribunal presiding over the Dora-Mittelbau war crimes trial in September, 1947.

Colonel Frank Silliman III took over the chairmanship of a Military tribunal consisting of seven American officers, including Colonel Joseph W. Benson, Colonel Claude O. Burch, Lieutenant Colonel Louis S. Tracy, Lieutenant Colonel Roy J. Herte, Major Warren M. Vanderburgh, and the lawyer Lieutenant Colonel David H. Thomas.

=== Prosecution team ===
The prosecution consisted of Chief Prosecutor William Berman, Captain William F. McGarry, Captain John J. Ryan, Lieutenant William F. Jones, and investigators Jacob F. Kinder and William J. Aalmans. Aalmans, a Dutch citizen serving with the U.S. Army, served as a translator during the liberation of the central camp complex. He also heard the testimony of the accused as a member of the investigative team. Aalmans produced a booklet entitled the "Dora"-Nordhausen Labor-Concentration Camps.

=== Defense team ===
The accused were defended by two American Army officers, Major Leon B. Poullada and Captain Paul D. Strader, and German legal advisers Konrad Max Trimolt, Emil Aheimer, and Louis Renner. From 31 October 1947, Milton Crook supported the defense team after a request by Poullada.

=== Defendants ===
The defendants consisted of 14 members of the SS, 4 Kapos and 1 civilian: Georg Rickhey, Director-General of the Mittelwerk GmbH. SS-Obersturmführer Kurt Mathesius, who had commanded the subcamp of Boelke Kaserne, was slated to appear as the 20th defendant at trial, but committed suicide while in US custody in May, 1947. The highest-ranking defendant was the former camp physician, SS-Hauptsturmführer Heinrich Schmidt.

The Dora Defendants in June, 1947

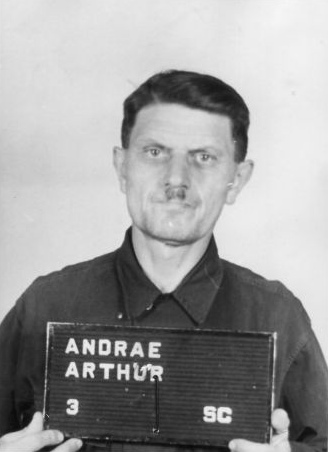
Arthur Kurt Andräe

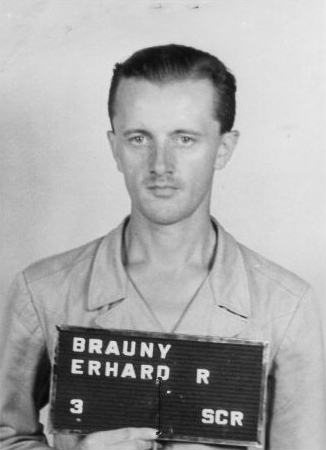
Erhard Richard Brauny

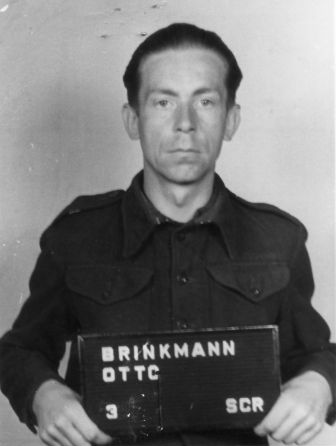
Otto Georg Werner Brinkmann

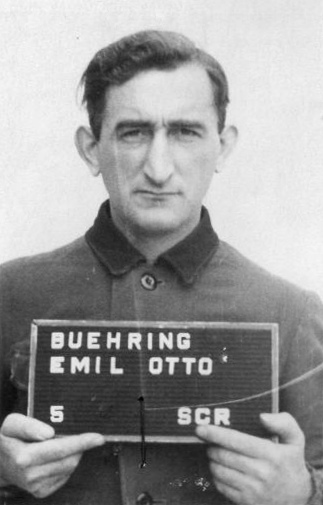
Emil Otto Bühring

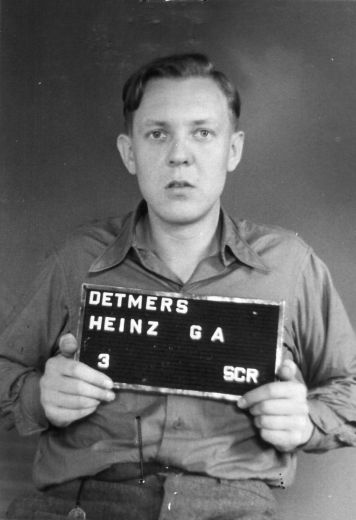
Heinrich Georg Alfred Detmers

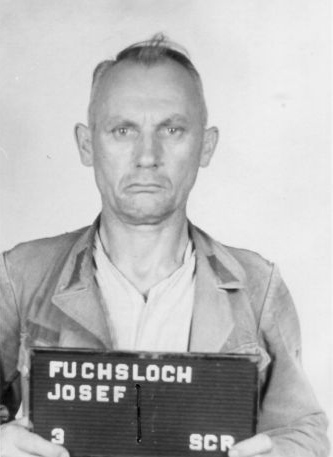
Josef Fuchsloch

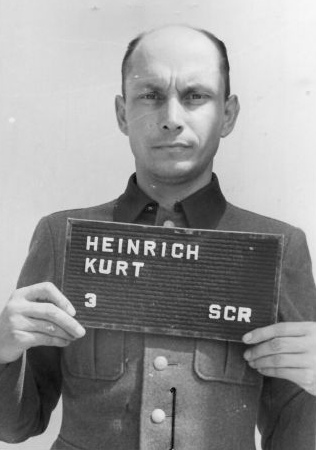
Richard Kurt Heinrich

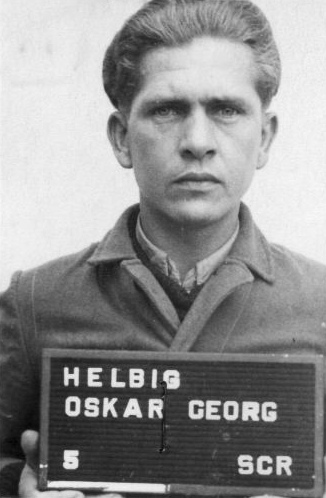
Oskar Georg Helbig

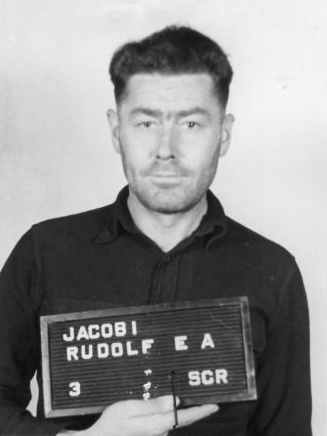
Rudolf Ewald Otto Jacobi

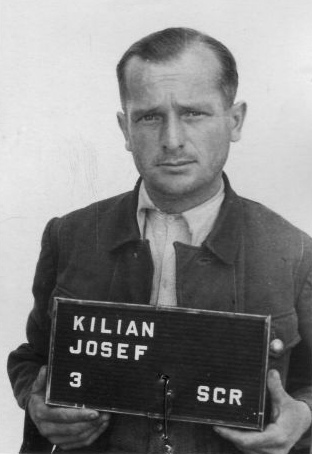
Josef Kilian

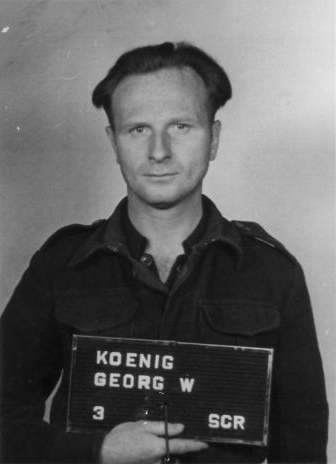
Georg Wilhelm König

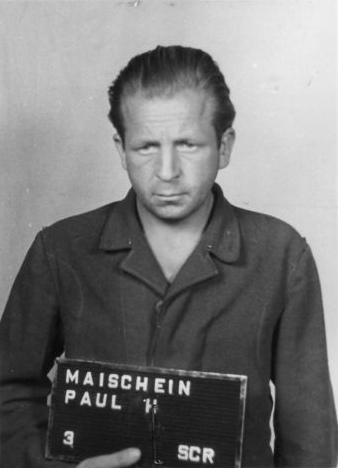
Paul H. Maischein

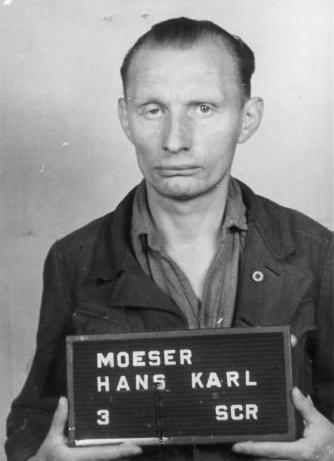
Hans Karl Möser

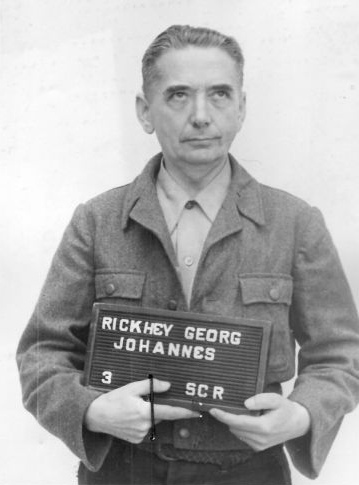
Georg Johannes Rickhey

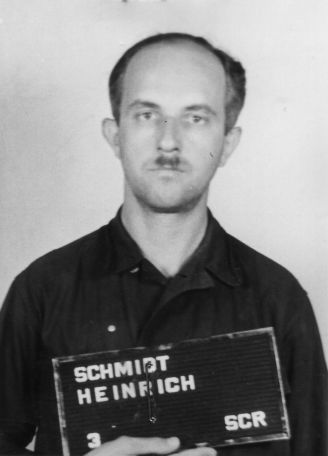
Dr. Heinrich Schmidt

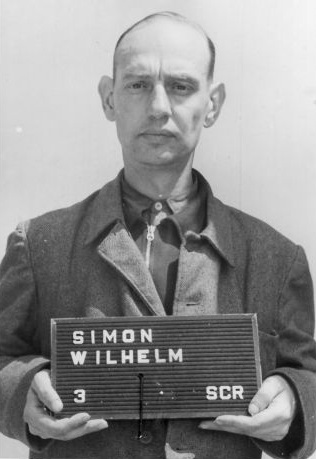
Wilhelm Simon

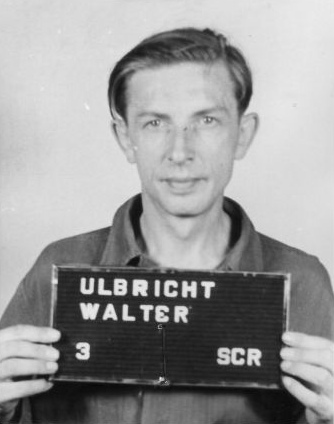
Walter Ernst Ulbricht

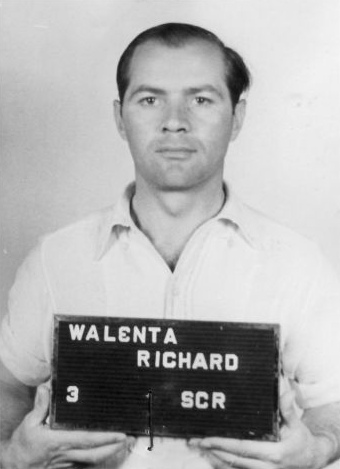
Richard Walenta

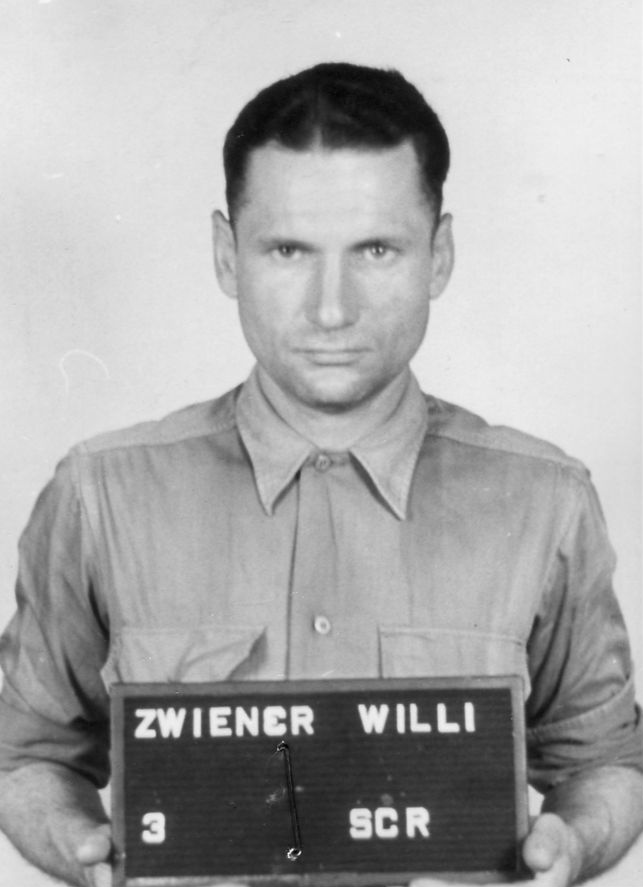
Willi Zwiener

== Trial ==
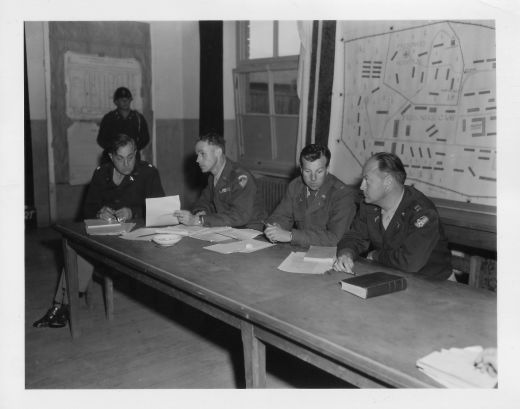
Prosecution in the Dora Trial on 19 September 1947. From left to right: Lt. Col. William Berman, Capt. William F. McGarry, 1st Lt. William F. Jones, and Capt. John F. Ryan.

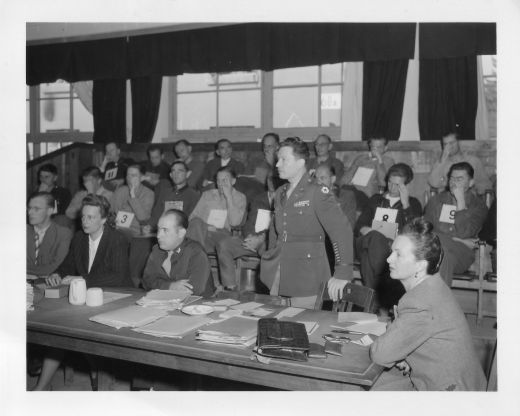
Representatives of the defense on 19 September 1947. In the foreground is Leon Poullada and Capt. Paul Strader. In the background is the accused.

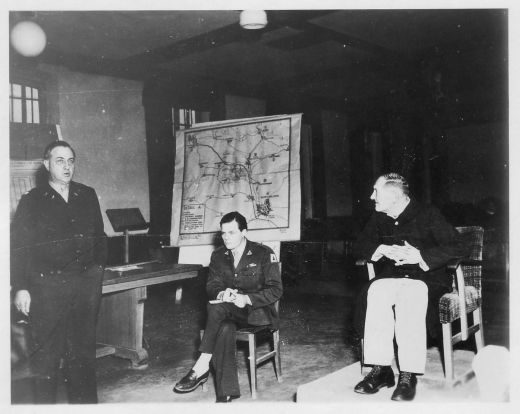
A defense witness makes statements about the Gardelegen Massacre

The trial began on 7 August 1947 before the "General Military Government Court" at the US Army Dachau Internment Camp, within the walls of the former Nazi Dachau concentration camp, and was open to the public. An interpreter translated between the Court and the accused in English and German, as the language of the Court was English. After the reading of the indictment, the defendants all pled "not guilty". All were accused of neglecting, abusing and killing prisoners. Some defendants were also accused of specific offenses in the context of death marches or in the course of the "evacuation of the camp". Former camp physician Heinrich Schmidt was accused of medical neglect of inmates, causing them to die of hunger, exposure, and disease. The main responsibility for the inhumane living conditions was attributed to former Protective Custody Camp Leader Hans Möser. The four prisoners who functioned as camp Kapos were also accused of abusing and sometimes killing fellow prisoners. German Civilian Georg Rickhey, as a former General Manager of Mittelwerk Gmbh, was held responsible for the disastrous working conditions.

=== Pretrial motions ===
At the request of the prosecution, defendants Albin Sawatzki, Otto Brenneis, Hans Joachim Ritz and Stefan Palko were deleted from the list of the accused. Defense counsel Poullada unsuccessfully made several requests as to the Military Court's jurisdiction. He petitioned for the removal of the words "and other non-German nationals" in the indictment, arguing that U.S. military courts were not responsible for the prosecution of war crimes committed by German citizens upon nationals of Allies of the Third Reich. This request was not granted as the court decided that the crimes against non-German victims would therefore go unpunished. In addition, Poullada repeatedly requested removal of the legal institution of the Common Design, because in his opinion the court's decision process should not be based on Common Design but upon individually verifiable crimes. This application was refused as well.

=== Opening arguments ===
In his opening argument, chief prosecutor Berman explained that Mittelbau-Dora not only provided a source of forced labor for the Reich armaments industry, but that its primary purpose was the deliberate killing of concentration camp prisoners by a systematic policy of extermination through labor (German: Vernichtung durch Arbeit). Berman went on to present evidence submitted at the arraignment of the defendants and placed it in the immediate context of war crimes by identifying specific camp operations targeted at human destruction. According to his argument, therefore, all the accused were guilty of mass murder.

=== Evidence ===
Evidence presented by prosecutor Ludendorff attempted to prove the inherent criminality of the Mittelbau-Dora complex through the identified responsibility of individual defendants in the system as a whole, and by specific proof of the commission of or participation in excessive acts within that system. In addition to the living and working conditions in the camp, the prosecution also referred to the death marches as evidence of collective criminality, with the Gardelegen Massacre a primary focus. In their arguments, the prosecution presented more than 70 camp survivors as witnesses. The witnesses reported on the appalling conditions, especially of inadequate food and clothing, poor hygiene and poor medical care, and the imposition of punishments.

The testimony of the witnesses regarding forced labor at the complex were essentially descriptions of working and living conditions during the construction phase of the camp during winter of 1943–1944. This phase, also known as the "Hell of Dora", was marked by exhausting work in digging tunnels into the Kohnstein Mountain to create a subterranean V-weapons (German: Vergeltungswaffen) rocket factory. Statements referring to the subsequent functioning of the Mittelwerk Assembly Plant formed a second priority in this context. Executions of camp prisoners due to alleged rebellion and sabotage were also portrayed. Of the 19 accused, 13 took advantage of their right to testify in their own behalf, the rest referenced their own interrogation logs. The defendants either downplayed their actions, stated they were only following orders (the Führerprinzip), or claimed they were not present at the scene of the crimes. The defense offered 65 witnesses, and the military court was provided with 9 additional written statements for the defense.

On the living conditions in subcamp Boelcke Kaserne, where about half of the concentration camp prisoners captured did not survive, the camp doctor stated: "The weather in March 1945 was at that time very sunny and warm. In accommodation Blocks 6 and 7 the prisoners spent almost all day on the south wall sunning themselves."

=== Rickhey case ===
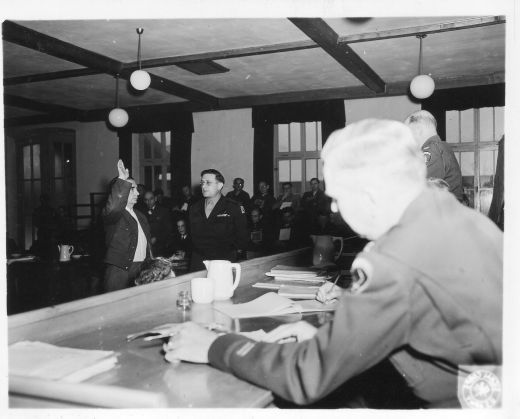
Georg Rickhey being sworn in before giving his statements on 18 December 1947.

As sole representative of the Mittelwerk Gmbh, Georg Rickhey was at the center of the Court proceedings on forced labor in the plant. Rickhey was alleged to have been responsible for the disastrous working conditions, cooperating closely with the SS and Gestapo, and being present during executions. The proof for this war crime was important, as Rickhey – unlike the other defendants – could not be blamed for the catastrophic living conditions in the concentration camps or the execution of the death marches. The basis of the prosecution was his participation in the underground missile production of the V-1 and V-2 rockets, which required the use of forced labor.

Rickhey was exonerated by statements of past employees and written interrogations of his engineering colleagues – only the testimony of one former engineer was incriminating. Witnesses offered by the prosecution made only vague statements about his activities in camp operations because they had generally not personally witnessed it. Written evidence of Rickhey's guilt was also lacking; only after the end of the trial were documents found showing his culpability in the inhumane working conditions in the Mittelwork. Rickhey testified on his own behalf and put the entire responsibility for the inhumane conditions and forced labor on the late internment engineer Albin Sawatzki, who had died in American detention in 1945. Furthermore, he pointed to his cooperation with the U.S. Air Force (USAF) at Wright-Patterson Air Force Base.

=== Closing arguments ===
In closing arguments, prosecutor Berman argued for the death penalty for all defendants, because if a consistent interpretation of Common Design were applied then they were all mass murderers. The defense did well in their closing arguments. They insisted on the non-application of Common Design and asked the court to consider only those crimes that could be individually proven. Poullada appealed that the military court use the "high standards of Anglo-American jurisprudence". In this view, the accused should not be judged differently than American citizens in a court of law and therefore should be acquitted if the evidence against them was not unequivocal. For Rickhey in particular, the defense asked for an acquittal because the allegations against him could not be proved.

== Verdicts ==
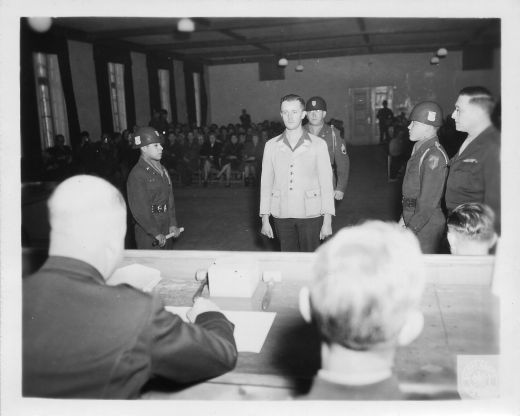
Defendant Erhard Brauny receives his judgment on 30 December 1947

The chairman of the military court announced the verdicts on Christmas Eve, 1947 and delivered the corresponding sentences on December 30. Seven life sentences, seven fixed-term prison sentences, and one death penalty were handed down. Four defendants were acquitted, including Rickhey.

A review of the verdicts was completed on 23 April 1948 by the Deputy Judge Advocate for War Crimes, which were all confirmed with one exception: regarding the offender Oskar Helbig, the sentence of twenty years in prison was reduced to ten. The United States War Crimes Board of Review then conducted a second review of the recommendations. The military Governor of the American occupation zone, Lucius D. Clay, confirmed all the judgments according to the recommendations in the review process and pronounced them final on June 25, 1948.

The 19 verdicts were in particular:

| Name | Rank | Function | Verdict |
|---|---|---|---|
| Hans Möser | SS-Obersturmführer | Protective Custody Camp Leader at the Dora main complex | Death by hanging, executed on November 26, 1948 |
| Erhard Brauny | SS-Hauptscharführer | Protective Custody Camp Leader at the Rottleberode subcamp, detachment commander in Dora | Life imprisonment |
| Otto Brinkmann | SS-Hauptscharführer | Rapportführer in Dora, Protective Custody Leader in subcamp Ellrich-Juliushütte | Life imprisonment |
| Emil Bühring | SS-Stabsscharführer | Head of the Bunker | Life imprisonment |
| Ruldof Jacobi | SS-Hauptscharführer | Construction manager of camp barracks in Dora | Life imprisonment |
| Josef Kilian | Kapo | Executioner in Dora | Life imprisonment |
| Georg König | SS-Hauptscharführer | Rapportführer in Dora, responsible for the vehicle fleet | Life imprisonment |
| Wilhelm Simon | SS-Oberscharführer | Arbeitseinsatzführer | Life imprisonment |
| Willi Zwiener | Kapo | Highest ranking Kapo in Dora | 25 years imprisonment |
| Arthur Andräe | SS-Hauptscharführer | Head of the Post Office in Dora | 20 years imprisonment |
| Oskar Helbig | SS-Oberscharführer | Manager of the Food Warehouse in Dora | 20 years imprisonment, reduced to 10 years imprisonment |
| Richard Walenta | Kapo | Highest ranking Kapo in subcamp Ellrich-Juliushütte, Aufseher in Dora | 20 years imprisonment |
| Heinrich Detmers | SS-Obersturmführer | Adjutant to the Camp Commandant | 7 years imprisonment (Note: It was announced before the Military Tribunal that in January 1947, in a secondary proceeding of the Dachau Trials (Case No. 000-50-2-23 US vs. Alex Piorkowski et al.), that Detmers had already been sentenced to 15 years in prison. The penalty had also been reduced to five years after a review procedure. Upon the Dora Trial verdict, it was determined that both sentences should be served concurrently.) |
| Walter Ernst Ulbricht | Kapo | Office clerk in subcamp Rottleberode | 5 years imprisonment |
| Paul Maischein | SS-Rottenführer | SS medical orderly in subcamp Rottleberode | 5 years imprisonment |
| Josef Fuchsloch | SS-Hauptscharführer | Deputy Camp Leader of subcamp Harzungen | Acquitted |
| Kurt Heinrich | SS-Obersturmführer | Adjutant to the Camp Commandant | Acquitted |
| Georg Rickhey | Civilian | Director General of Mittelwerke, GmbH | Acquitted |
| Heinrich Schmidt | SS-Hauptsturmführer | Physician in the subcamp Boelcke-Kaserne | Acquitted |

== Secondary trials ==
During the Dora Trial, additional proceedings against five lower-level defendants occurred between late October 1947 and mid-December 1947. These were short-term trials agreed between the prosecution and the defense, each lasting a few days. There were a total of 14 secondary procedures planned, however 9 were cancelled for lack of witnesses and evidence. In addition, Case 004 (listed below) was begun but not pursued for the same reasons.

The five cases and their verdicts
| Case | Defendant | Rank | Function | Verdict |
|---|---|---|---|---|
| Case No. 000-Nordhausen-1 | Michail Grebinski | Romanian SS guard | Guard in Dora-Mittelbau | Acquitted |
| Case No. 000-Nordhausen-2 | Albert Mueller | SS-Rottenführer | Guard in Dora-Mittelbau | 25 years imprisonment, reduced to 10 years imprisonment |
| Case No. 000-Nordhausen-3 | Georg Finkenzeller | Kapo | Guard in the Quarries command | 2 years imprisonment |
| Case No. 000-Nordhausen-4 | | | | Case dropped due to a lack of evidence |
| Case No. 000-Nordhausen-5 | Philipp Klein | SS-Scharführer | SS medical orderly | 4 years imprisonment |
| Case No. 000-Nordhausen-6 | Stefan Palko | SS-Rottenführer | Block Leader | 25 years imprisonment, reduced to 15 years imprisonment |

== Execution of sentence ==
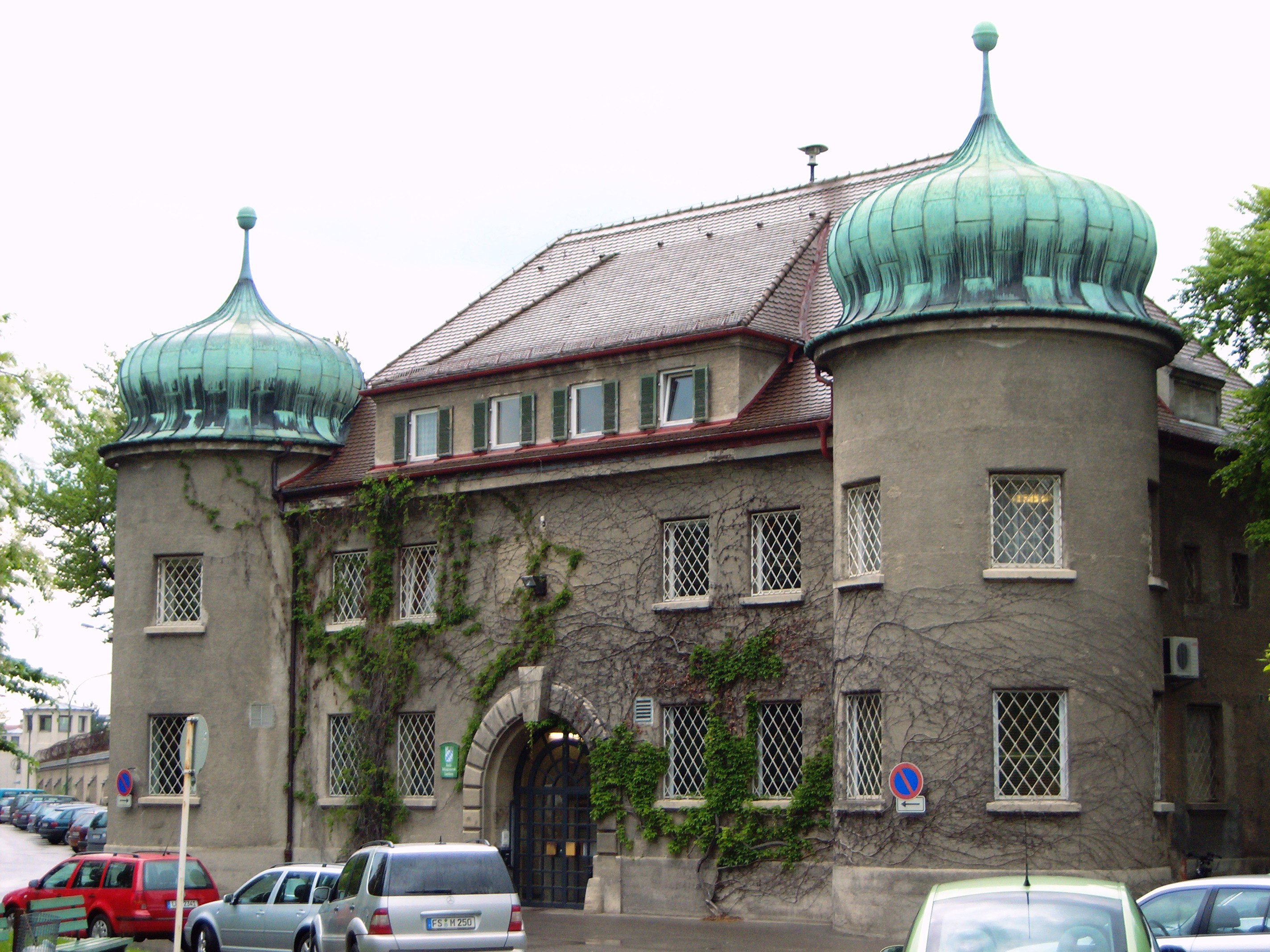
Landsberg Prison

After the verdict, the convicts were transferred to Landsberg Prison to serve out their sentences. Möser, the only defendant sentenced to death, was executed by hanging on November 26, 1948. All of the other convicts were released early, with the exception of Erhard Brauny, who died in prison in 1950. The last defendant released was Otto Brinkmann on May 9, 1958. Brinkmann and three men who had been convicted in the Einsatzgruppen Trial were the last four inmates to be released from Landsberg Prison at the conclusion of the U.S. War Crimes program.

== Analysis and reactions ==
As measured by the 2,400-strong staff of the Mittelbau-Dora complex, only a small number were actually charged: Only 19 defendants were indicted in the Dora Trial and 5 in the collateral proceedings. Also, in relation to other Dachau concentration camp procedures, the number of defendants was rather low. The tendency for leniency in the Dora Trial was clear: In the main Dachau Trials, 36 of the 40 defendants were sentenced to death; in Dora, only one. Moreover, this last of the Dachau Trials occurred over three and a half years after the liberation of Mittelbau. By this time, the judges could only hearken back to indirect impressions of camp horrors, unlike the earlier trials. Moreover, witnesses who were needed to identify the accused were often nowhere to be found.

In addition, by contrast to the Buchenwald Trial completed in the American Zone in August 1947, the Dora Trial received minimal public attention. Differences in newspaper coverage were obvious: In the Frankfurter Rundschau, the headlines of 8 August 1947 read: "Sensational Trial at Dachau. 19 defendants from the Death Camp of Nordhausen - The secret to producing the V-weapons in Dora". In the southern Harz region where Nordhausen was located, now in the Soviet Zone, this American trial was barely mentioned.

The legal institution of common design was applied, but not as consistently as in the main Dachau concentration camp trials. For example, defendant Kurt Heinrich, former adjutant to the camp commander, was acquitted. In the Dachau Trials, Rudolf Heinrich Suttrop was sentenced to death for performing the same function. This trend is also evident at the Secondary Dora proceedings, where the indictments had been for a single, provable offense and not common design.

In addition, neither Wernher von Braun nor Arthur Rudolph nor other important representatives of the Mittelwerk GmbH were indicted or required to appear in court to testify. They were, as Rickhey before them, sent away in Operation Paperclip for rocket research in the United States. Only interrogation logs from Rudolph and von Braun were available, both fully exonerating Rickhey. During this time the American authorities began to pursue a policy opposing the further prosecution of war crimes in order to utilize the expertise of the engineers in the Cold War.

Denazification also lost importance as the Allies wanted to win over West Germany as an ally. In the German population, after the first shock of the concentration camp crimes, solidarity emerged with the welfare of the war criminals in Landsberg Prison. This was also reflected in the gradual mitigation of sentences and the premature commuting of sentences.

== Later Mittelbau-Dora legal proceedings ==
Long after the Dachau Dora Trials were complete, violent crimes still extant in the body of facts resulted in new Mittelbau-Dora trials both in West Germany and East Germany. The most important was the Essen Trial, held on 17 November 1967 before the District Court at Essen, West Germany. In these proceedings, former camp guard Erwin Busta, Gestapo official Ernst Sander and chief of security for the V-weapons program Helmut Bischoff were tried. Among the charges were summary executions of prisoners who had attempted escape or who were accused of sabotage. Furthermore, the murder of 58 suspected resistance fighters and deadly abuses in "enhanced interrogation" of prisoners were subject to proceedings. During the trial, East German lawyer Friedrich Karl Kaul was counsel for the plaintiffs by summons. Bischoff's participation in the proceedings on 5 May 1970 had to be suspended because of ill health and were postponed until 1974. On 8 May 1970, Busta was sentenced to eight and a half years and Sander sentenced to seven and a half years in prison.

== Dora Trial today ==
In the spring of 2004, while emptying a container of waste paper, the owner of a recycling company in Kerkrade, Netherlands found an extensive set of documents from the Dora Trials as well as original photographs of the initial liberation of Mittelbau-Dora and its auxiliary camps. It was not possible to identify how these documents came to be in the waste container. However, it is clear they were from the estate of William Aalmans, the Dutch citizen who served with the U.S. Army in the liberation of Mittelbau-Dora and then worked for the prosecution in the Dora Trial. In the beginning of July 2004, all the documents were given over to the Mittelbau-Dora Concentration Camp Memorial (German: Gedenkstätte Mittelbau-Dora). The documents, many of which were previously unknown, are an extremely valuable addition to the collection. Many are now on display at the new permanent exhibition at the former camp site, opened in April 2006.

== Bibliography ==
- Deputy Judge Advocate's Office 7708 War Crimes Group European Command APO 407: United States v. Kurt Andrae et al. Case No. 000-50-37. Review and Recommendations of the Deputy Judge Advocate for War Crimes, April 1948. (online PDF-file; 14.1 MB in English. Retrieved 02-25-2012).
- Löffelsender, Michael (2007). "'A particularly unique role among concentration camps'. Der Dachauer Dora-Prozess 1947". In Kramer, Helmut; Uhl, Karsten; Wagner, Jens-Christian (eds.). Zwangsarbeit im Nationalsozialismus und die Rolle der Justiz. Täterschaft, Nachkriegsprozesse und die Auseinandersetzung um Entschädigungsleistungen (PDF) (in German). Stiftung Gedenkstätten Buchenwald und Mittelbau-Dora / Fachhochschule Nordhausen. pp. 152–68. Archived from the original (PDF) on 2016-01-09.
- Robert Sigel: Im Interesse der Gerechtigkeit. Die Dachauer Kriegsverbrecherprozesse 1945-48. (Frankfurt am Main: Campus, 1992) ISBN 3-593-34641-9
- Ute Stiepani: "Die Dachauer Prozesse und ihre Bedeutung im Rahmen der alliierten Strafverfolgung von NS-Verbrechen." In: Gerd R. Ueberschär: Die alliierten Prozesse gegen Kriegsverbrecher und Soldaten 1943 - 1952. (Frankfurt am Main: Fischer, 1999) ISBN 3-596-13589-3
- Wagner, Jens-Christian (2001). Produktion des Todes: Das KZ Mittelbau-Dora. Göttingen: Wallstein. ISBN 3-89244-439-0.
- Wagner, Jens-Christian, ed. (2007). Mittelbau-Dora Concentration Camp 1943-1945. Guide to the Permanent Exhibition at Mittelbau-Dora Concentration Camp Memorial. Göttingen: Wallstein. ISBN 978-3-8353-0118-4.
