= Gardelegen massacre =

German war crime – massacre during World War II

Coordinates: 52°32′16″N 11°25′19″E

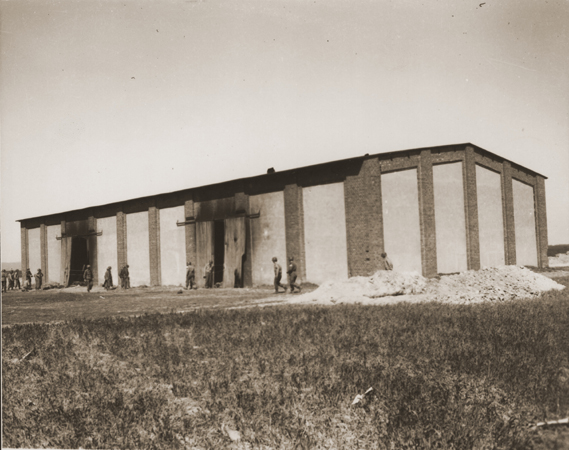
The barn set on fire in the Gardelegen Massacre

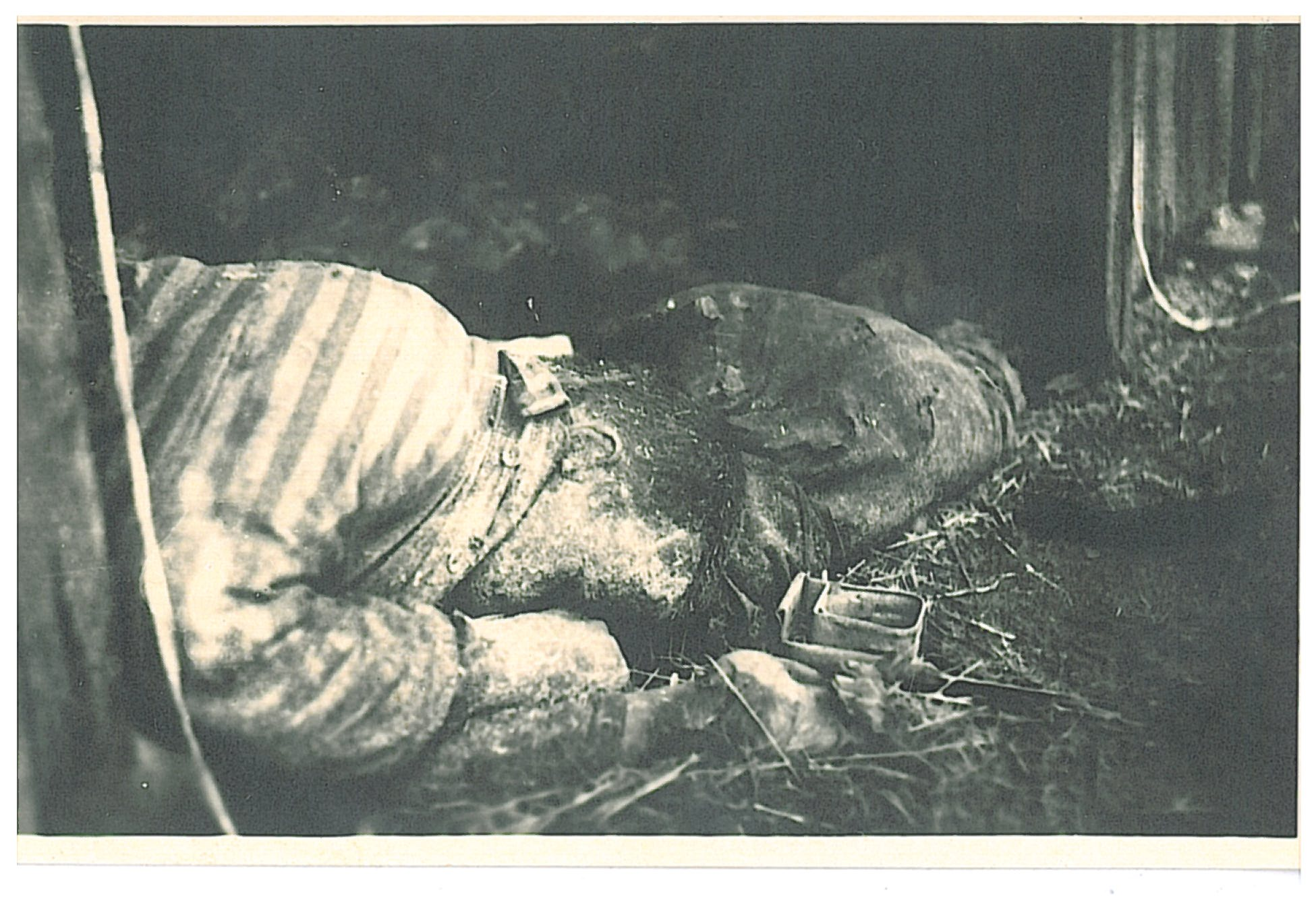
Dead victims

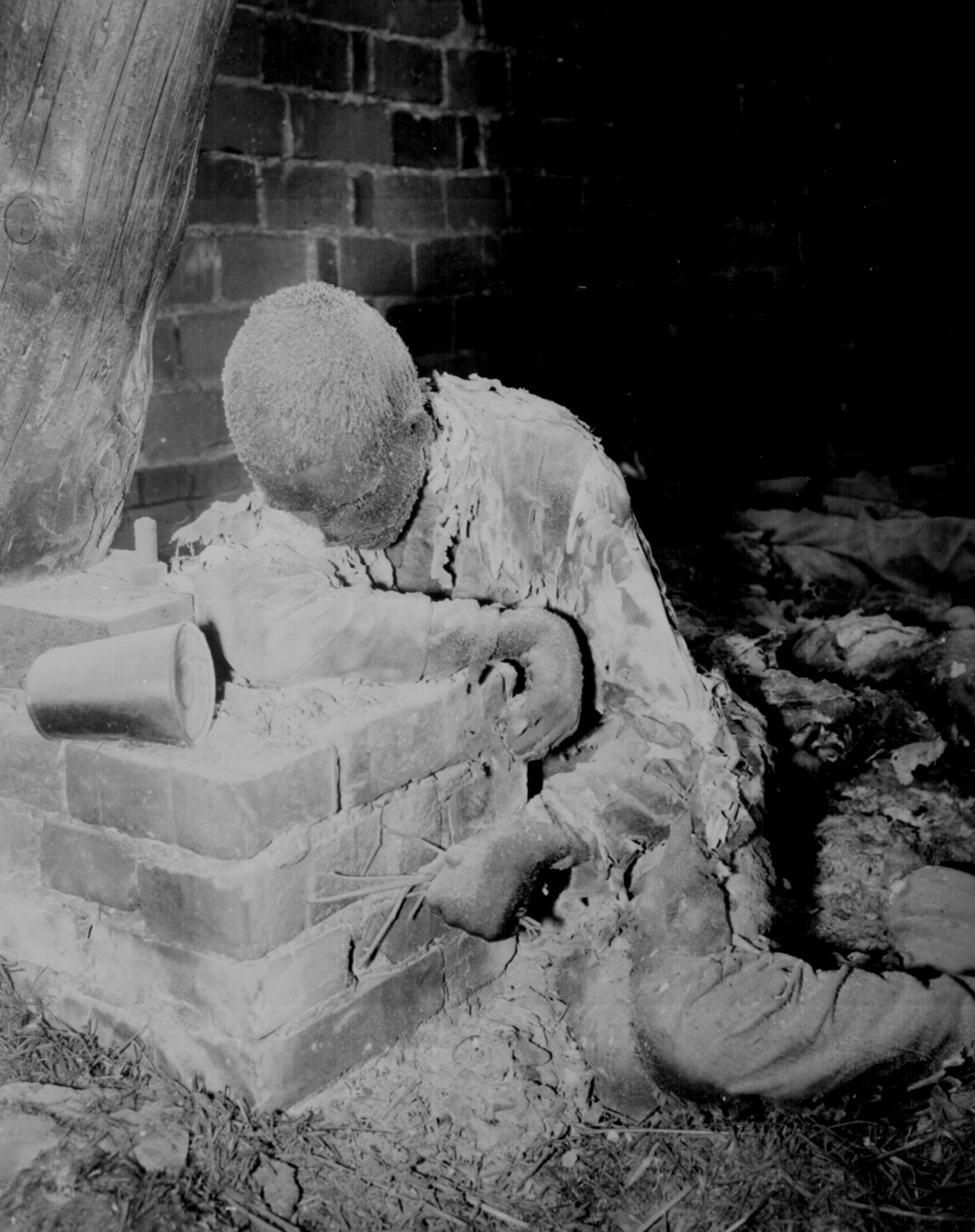
A photograph originally captioned "This victim of Nazi inhumanity still rests in the position in which he died, attempting to rise and escape his horrible death. He was one of 1016 prisoners savagely burned to death by Nazi SS troops. Gardelegen, Germany; 16 April 1945"

The Gardelegen massacre was a massacre perpetrated by the locals (Volkssturm, Hitlerjugend and local firefighters) of the northern German town of Gardelegen, with direction from the SS, near the end of World War II. On April 13, 1945, on the Isenschnibbe estate near the town, the troops forced over 1,000 slave laborers who were part of a transport train evacuated from the Mittelbau-Dora and Hannover-Stöcken concentration camps into a large barn, which was then set on fire.

One thousand and sixteen people, of whom the largest number were Poles, were burned alive or shot trying to escape. The crime was discovered two days later by Company F, 2nd Battalion, 405th Infantry Regiment, U.S. 102nd Infantry Division, when the U.S. Army occupied the area. Eleven prisoners were found alive – seven Poles, three Russians and a Frenchman. The testimonies of survivors were collected and published by Melchior Wańkowicz in 1969, in the book From Stołpców to Cairo. Gardelegen became a part of the newly established German Democratic Republic in 1947 and is now in Saxony-Anhalt, Germany.

== The Atrocity ==
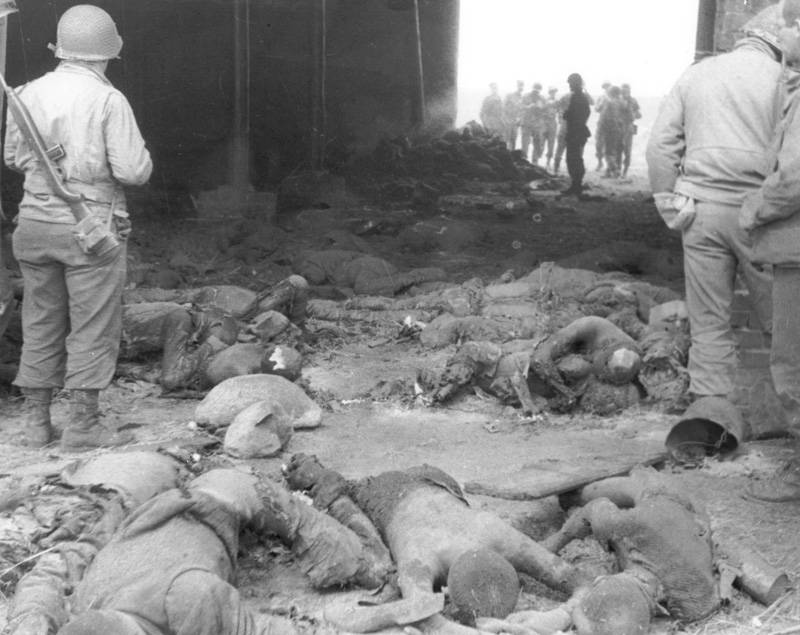
American soldiers view bodies in barn

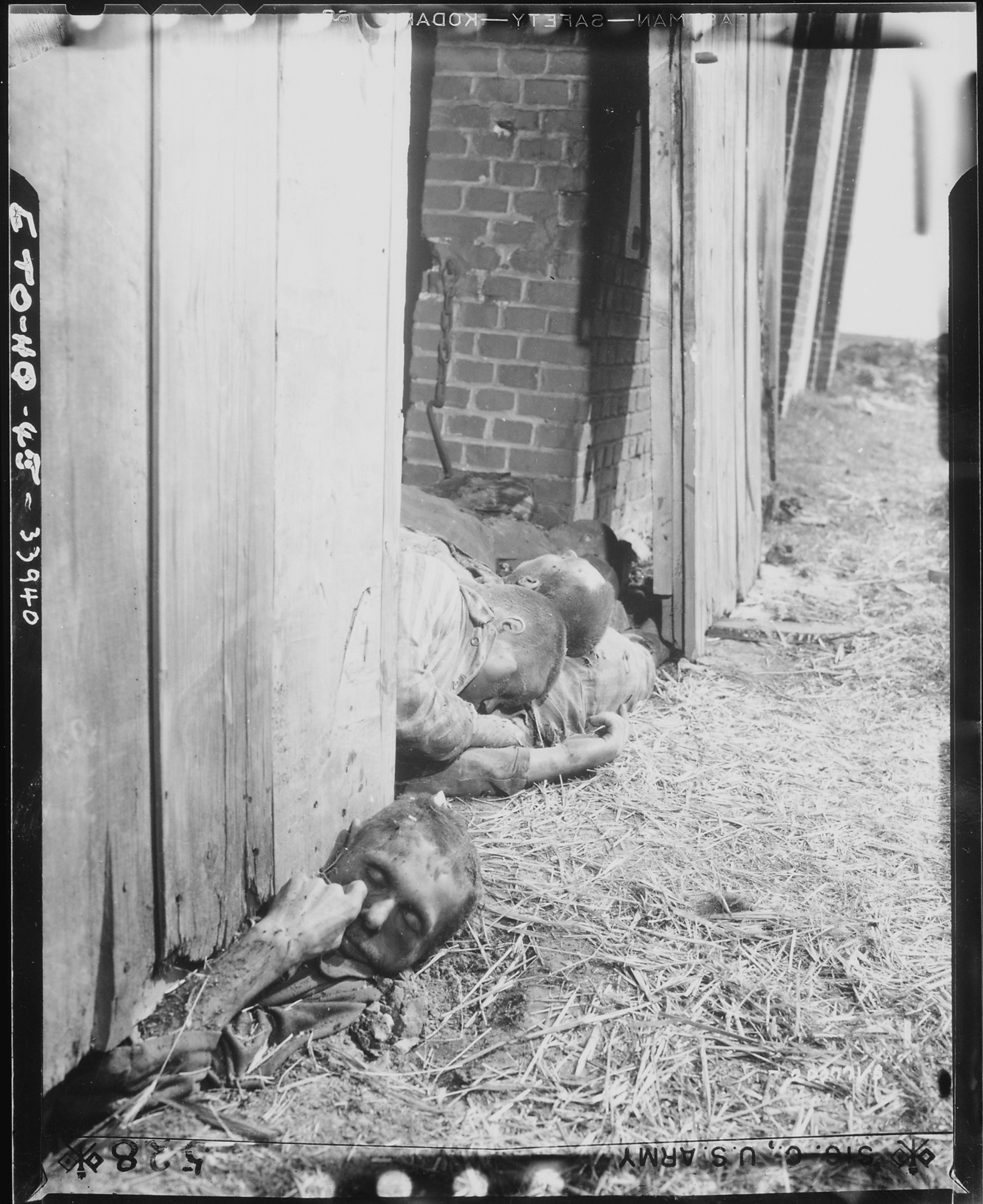
Men who attempted to escape the conflagration

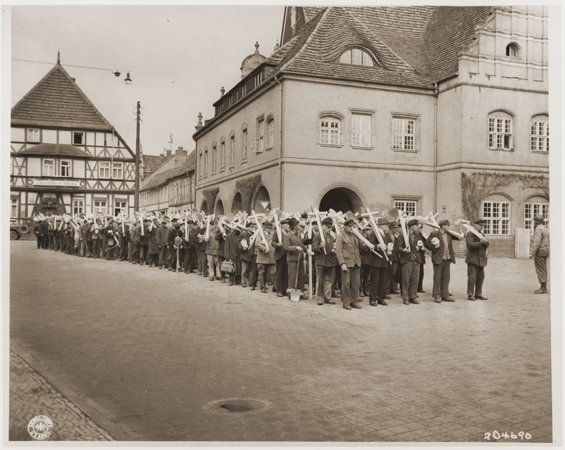
Under the direction of an American soldier, Germans from Gardelegen carry wooden crosses to the site where they were ordered to bury the bodies of concentration camp prisoners killed by the SS in a barn just outside the town

On April 3–4, following the U.S. Army's crossing of the Rhine River and push into Germany, the SS camp administration at Dora-Mittelbau ordered the evacuation of prisoners from the main camp and a number of its affiliated subcamps. They intended to transport the inmates, by train or by foot, to the other north German concentration camps: Bergen-Belsen, Sachsenhausen, or Neuengamme.

Within days, some 4,000 people held in the Mittelbau-Dora camp, its satellite camps, and from the Hannover-Stöcken subcamp of Neuengamme arrived in the Gardelegen area, where they had to deboard from the freight cars because the trains could not advance any further due to air raid damage to the rail lines. Greatly outnumbered by the prisoners, the SS guards began recruiting auxiliary forces from the local fire department, the air force, the aged home guard, the Hitler Youth, and other organizations, to watch over the inmates.

On April 13, more than a thousand prisoners, many of them sick and too weak to march any further, were taken from the town of Gardelegen to a large barn on the Isenschnibbe estate and forced inside the building. The assembled guards then barricaded the doors and set fire to gasoline-soaked straw. Those who escaped the conflagration by digging under the barn's walls were killed by the guards. The next day, the SS and local auxiliaries returned to dispose of the evidence of their crime. They planned to incinerate what remained of the bodies and the barn, and kill any survivors of the blaze. The swift advance of the 102nd Infantry Division, however, prevented the SS and its accomplices from completely carrying out this plan.

== Discovery ==
The discovery of the massacre seems to have been by chance. The consensus account is that American Lieutenant Emerson Hunt, a liaison officer between 102nd Infantry Division headquarters and the 701st Tank Battalion, was captured by German forces on April 14, 1945, and bluffed the German forces defending the town of Gardelegen into believing that American tanks were approaching the city. This induced the German commander to surrender to the American forces.

On April 14, the 102nd entered Gardelegen and, the following day, discovered the atrocity. The Americans arrived at the site before the Germans had time to bury all of the bodies. The 102nd found 1,016 corpses in the still-smoldering barn and in nearby trenches where the SS had the charred remains dumped. The Americans also interviewed several of the prisoners who had managed to escape the fire and the shootings. U.S. Army Signal Corps photographers soon arrived to document the Nazi crime and by April 19, 1945, the story of the Gardelegen massacre began appearing in the Western press. On that day, both the New York Times and The Washington Post ran stories on the massacre, quoting one American soldier who stated:

I never was so sure before of exactly what I was fighting for. Before this you would have said those stories were propaganda, but now you know they weren't. There are the bodies and all those guys are dead.

Eleven prisoners survived the burning of the barn and were found alive by U.S. soldiers – seven Poles, three Russians and one severely wounded Frenchman. According to eyewitnesses, 20 men were summarily executed by U.S. soldiers after survivors identified them as participants in the massacre.

On April 21, 1945, the local commander from the 102nd ordered between 200 and 300 men from the town of Gardelegen to give the murdered prisoners a proper burial. Over the next few days, the German civilians exhumed 586 bodies from the trenches and recovered 430 bodies from the barn, placing each in an individual grave. On April 25, the 102nd carried out a ceremony to honor the dead and erected a memorial tablet to the victims, which stated that the townspeople of Gardelegen are charged with the responsibility that the "graves are forever kept as green as the memory of these unfortunates will be kept in the hearts of freedom-loving men everywhere." Also on April 25, Colonel George Lynch addressed German civilians at Gardelegen with the following statement:

"The German people have been told that stories of German atrocities were Allied propaganda. Here, you can see for yourself. Some will say that the Nazis were responsible for this crime. Others will point to the Gestapo. The responsibility rests with neither — it is the responsibility of the German people....Your so-called Master Race has demonstrated that it is master only of crime, cruelty and sadism. You have lost the respect of the civilized world."

== Investigation ==
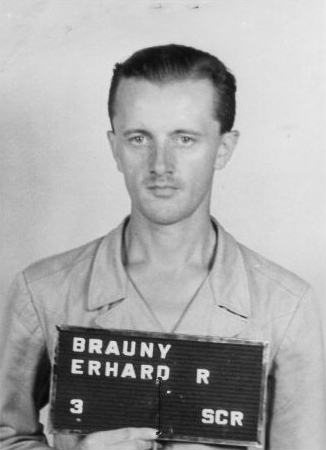
Erhard Brauny

An investigation was undertaken by Lieutenant Colonel Edward E. Cruise, Investigating Officer, Ninth Army War Crimes Branch. The text of Lieutenant Colonel Cruise's report and other exhibits are stored in US Army file 000-12-242.

SS-Untersturmführer Erhard Brauny, the transport leader for the prisoners evacuated from the Mittelbau-Dora concentration camp to Gardelegen, appeared before the Dachau Military Tribunal in 1947. He was convicted of abusing prisoners at Mittelbau-Dora in the Dora trial and sentenced to life in prison. Brauny died in prison of leukemia in 1950.

== Memorials ==
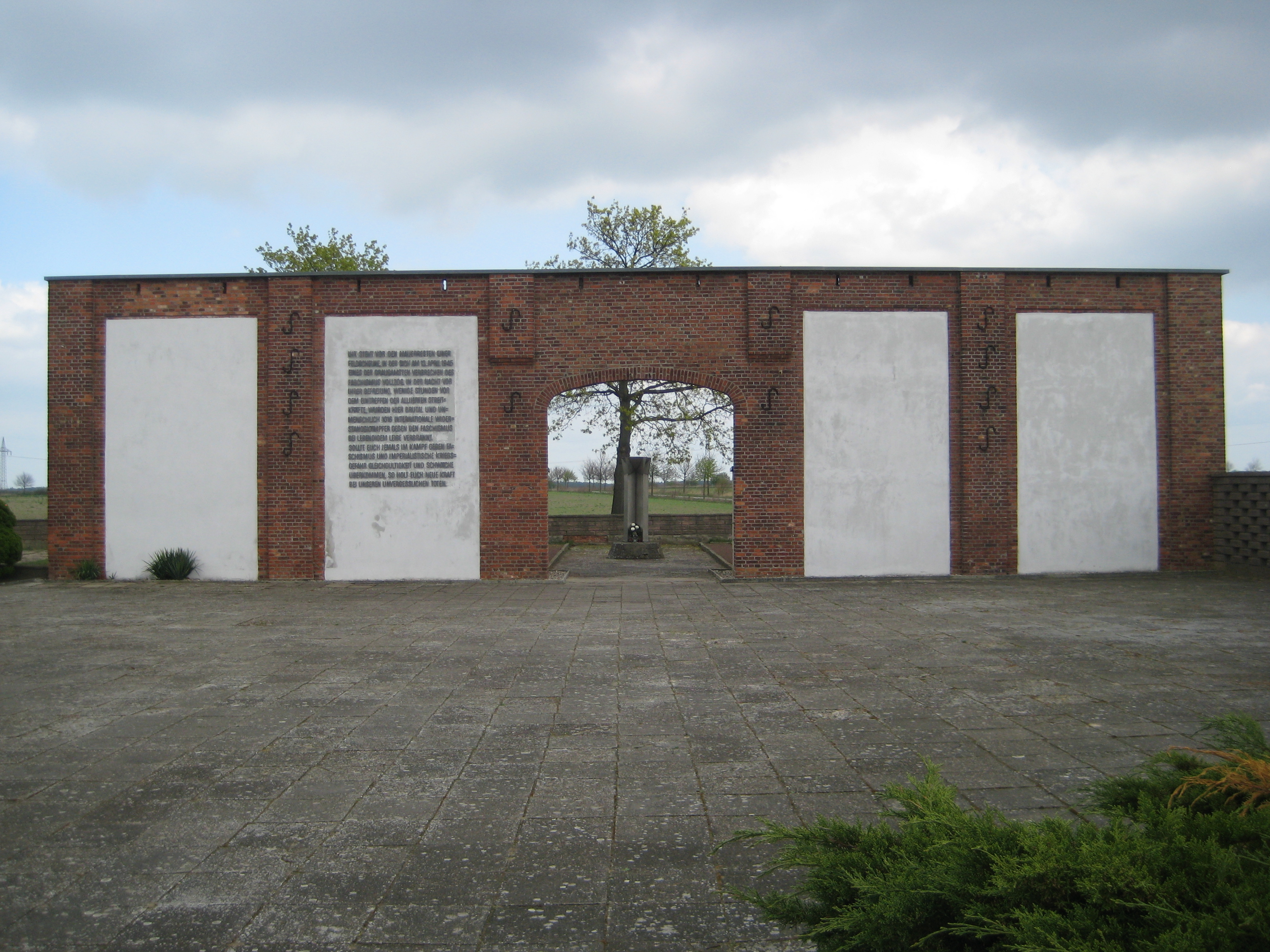
The surviving wall of the barn

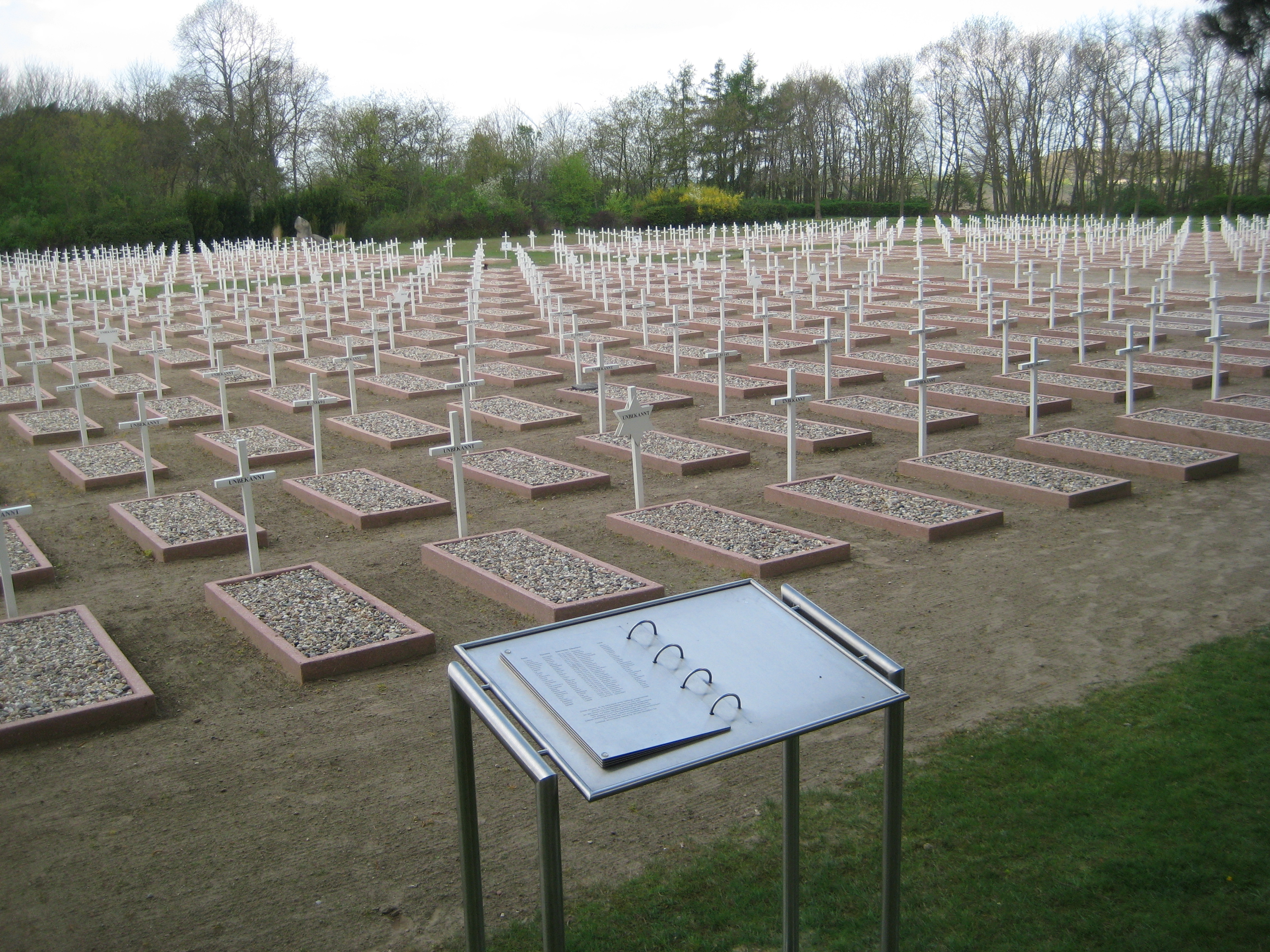
The cemetery

Gardelegen is now a national memorial, which was rearranged by East Germany from 1952 till 1971.

The sign at the cemetery, founded by the U.S. Army, reads:

Gardelegen
Military Cemetery

Here lie 1016 allied prisoners of war who were murdered by their captors.

They were buried by citizens of Gardelegen, who are charged with responsibility that graves are for- ever kept as green as the memory of these unfortunates will be kept in the hearts of freedom-loving men everywhere.

Established under supervision of 102nd Infantry Division, United States Army. Vandalism will be punished by maximum penalties under laws of military government.

Frank A. Keating Major General, U.S.A. Commanding

The sign at the remaining wall of the barn, applied by officials of the German Democratic Republic, reads:

You stand in front of the ruins of a barn, where one of the most cruel crimes of fascism was taking place. In the night of their liberation, a few hours before Allied forces approach, 1016 international fighters of resistance against fascism were brutally and inhumanely burned alive. Whenever you feel apathy or weakness in fighting against fascism and imperialistic threat of war, get new power from our unforgettable dead.

=== Memorial barn Isenschnibbe Gardelegen ===
The memorial is located at the historic scene of the massacre of Gardelegen. It is a reminder of the 1,016 concentration camp prisoners from many European countries who were murdered there on 13 April 1945 in a field barn near the Hanseatic city of Gardelegen. The site also includes the Memorial Cemetery, where the victims of the massacre are buried.

A new visitor/documentation centre with a permanent exhibition opened in 2020.

== Notes ==
This article incorporates text from the United States Holocaust Memorial Museum, and has been released under the GFDL.
