= Dachau trials =

Series of WWII war crimes trials

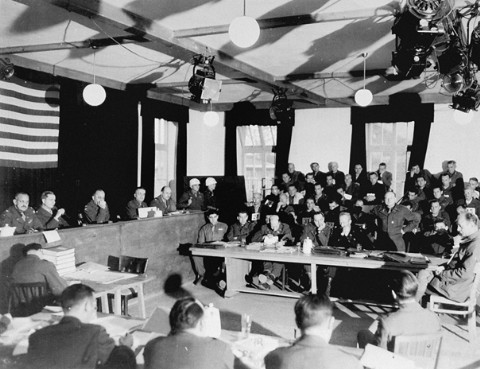
Ex-SS-Sturmbannführer Friedrich Wetzel, who was the officer in charge of distributing food and clothing in the Dachau concentration camp, testifies during the Dachau camp trial.

The Dachau trials, also known as the Dachau Military Tribunal, handled the prosecution of almost every war criminal captured in the U.S. military zones in Allied-occupied Germany and in Allied-occupied Austria, and the prosecutions of military personnel and civilian persons who committed war crimes against the American military and American citizens. The war-crime trials were held within the compound of the former Dachau concentration camp by military tribunals authorized by the Judge Advocate General of the U.S. Third Army.

The Nazi war criminals were held and tried at the Dachau concentration camp since the camp had buildings adequate to housing the many personnel required for and involved in the legal proceedings of a war-crimes trial, and since the Dachau prison camp had many jail cells in which to hold the Wehrmacht and Waffen-SS officers and soldiers accused of war crimes. The American Military Tribunal for the war-crime trials at Dachau featured the JAG attorney William Denson as the chief prosecutor, and the attorney Lt. Col. Douglas T. Bates Jr., an artillery officer, as the chief defense counsel.

== Proceedings ==
Unlike the international military trials in Nuremberg that prosecuted the major Nazi war criminals under the jurisdiction of the four Allied Occupying Powers, the Dachau tribunals were held exclusively by the United States military between August 1945 and December 1947. The proceedings were similar to the 12 post-1946 Nuremberg trials that were also conducted solely by the United States. All the hearings were held within Dachau because it was, at the time, the best known of the Nazi concentration camps and it would act as a backdrop for the trials by underlining the moral corruption of the Nazi regime. They were held by the American Military Tribunal, without a jury, but instead by a panel of seven men, one of whom was versed in international military law. The prosecution was different from most trials, in that the burden of proof was on the defense. The term used by Ben Ferencz was "quick trials".

The charges to be carried out by the United States Military were against Germans such as camp guards, some SS units and medical personnel, who had taken part in war crimes against allied nationals. The Dachau trials consisted of 465 trials of individuals from not only the Dachau concentration camp, but also Flossenbürg concentration camp, Mauthausen-Gusen concentration camp complex, Nordhausen concentration camp, Buchenwald concentration camp, and Mühldorf concentration camp complex and consisted of four main categories of charges: main camp offense, subsidiary camp offenses, atrocities against downed fliers, and then a catchall category mainly consisting of details about the Malmedy Massacre.

The first trial was that of Franz Strasser in August 1945. The mass trials started in November 1945 and were adjourned the following month. By December 13, 1947, when the trials adjourned once more, roughly 1200 defendants had been tried with roughly a 73% conviction rate. During the almost three years in total, the American military tribunals tried 1,672 German alleged war criminals in 489 separate proceedings. In total 1,416 former members of the Nazi regime were convicted; of these, 297 received death sentences and 279 were sentenced to life in prison. All convicted prisoners were sent to War Criminals Prison #1 at Landsberg am Lech to serve their sentences or to be hanged.

Two of the most highly publicized trials concerned the activities of German forces during the Battle of the Bulge in late 1944. In the Malmedy massacre trial, 73 members of the Waffen-SS were found guilty of summarily executing 84 American prisoners of war during the attack. In another trial, former German commando Otto Skorzeny and nine officers from the Panzer Brigade 150, were found not guilty of breaching the rules of war contrary to the Hague Convention of 1907 for wearing American military uniforms in a false flag operation, Operation Greif.

== The war-crime trials ==
- The Dachau camp trials: 40 officials were tried; 36 of the defendants were sentenced to death on 13 December 1945. Of these, 28 were hanged on 28 May and 29 May 1946, including the former commandant Martin Gottfried Weiss and the camp doctor Claus Schilling. Smaller groups of Dachau camp officials and guards were included in several subsequent trials by the U.S. court. On 21 November 1946 it was announced that, up to that date, 116 defendants of this category had been convicted and sentenced to terms of imprisonment.
- The Mauthausen camp trials: 61 officials of this camp were tried by a U.S. military court at Dachau in March/April, 1946; 58 defendants were sentenced to death by hanging on 13 May 1946. However, nine of the defendants who were sentenced to death had their sentences changed to life imprisonment (and later paroled), while the remaining three defendants were sentenced to life imprisonment. Those executed included the commandant of the SS-Totenkopfverbände.
- The Malmedy massacre trial: 74 Waffen-SS soldiers were tried between 16 May and 16 July 1946 for their involvement in the Malmedy massacre. Of the defendants, 43 were sentenced to death, 23 to life imprisonment, and seven received prison sentences of between ten and twenty years. One defendant had his charges withdrawn at the request of French authorities. None of the death sentences were carried out, and all defendants had been released from custody by 1956.
- The Flossenbürg camp trial: 52 officials and guards of this camp were tried between 12 June 1946 and 19 January 1947. Of the defendants, 15 were sentenced to death and 25 to terms of imprisonment. However, one of those who received a prison sentence in the main Flossenbürg trial, Erich Muhsfeldt, was later extradited to Poland. He was sentenced to death in the Auschwitz trial, and executed in 1948.
- The Buchenwald camp trial: between April and August, 1947, 31 defendants, Hermann Pister, Josias, Hereditary Prince of Waldeck and Pyrmont, Hermann Hackmann and Ilse Koch among them, were found guilty. Of these 22 were sentenced to death; 9 to imprisonment.
- The Mühldorf camp trial: five officials were sentenced to death by a U.S. war crimes court at Dachau on 13 May 1947 and seven to imprisonment.
- The Dora-Nordhausen Trial: On 7 August 1947 it convicted 15 former SS guards and Kapos, one of whom, Hans Möser, was executed. The trial also addressed the question of liability of Mittelwerk V-2 rocket scientists such as Georg Rickhey who was acquitted.

== Death sentences ==
- Richard Drauz: Former Nazi Party official, Kreisleiter of Heilbronn and member of the Reichstag (1933–1945). Sentenced to death on 11 December 1945 for his involvement in the summary execution of an Allied prisoner of war on 24 March 1945. Executed on 4 December 1946.
- August Eigruber: Ex SS-Obergruppenführer, Gauleiter (1938–1945) and Reichsstatthalter (1940–1945) of Reichsgau Oberdonau and Landeshauptmann of Upper Austria (1938–1940). Condemned to death on 13 May 1946 for his involvement in the establishment and administration of the Mauthausen-Gusen concentration camp. Executed on 28 May 1947.
- Otto Förschner: Ex SS-Sturmbannführer and former commandant of the Mittelbau-Dora concentration camp (1943–1945) and commander of the Dachau satellite-camp of Kaufering (February–April 1945). Sentenced to death on 13 December 1945 for crimes committed during his tenure at Kaufering. Executed on 28 May 1946.
- Friedrich Hildebrandt: Ex SS-Obergruppenführer, Gauleiter of Gau Mecklenburg (1925–1945) and Reichsstatthalter of Mecklenburg (1933–1945). Condemned to death on 2 April 1947 in the airmen's trial for violation of the Hague Conventions by issuing orders to capture and shoot parachuting U.S. aircrewmen. Executed on 5 November 1948.
- Eduard Krebsbach: Ex SS-Sturmbannführer and chief medical officer of Mauthausen-Gusen concentration camp (1941–1943). Condemned to death on 13 May 1946 for killing hundreds of ill and disabled inmates by administering lethal injections of the chemical compound Benzene. Executed on 28 May 1947.
- Julius Ludolf: Ex SS-Obersturmführer in the Mauthausen-Gusen concentration camp system (1940–1945). Served as commandant of the satellite-camps of Loibl, Großraming and Melk. Condemned to death on 13 May 1946 and executed on 28 May 1947.
- Hans Möser: Ex SS-Obersturmführer and commander of the protective custody camp at Mittelbau-Dora (1944–1945). Condemned to death on 30 December 1947 for his involvement in the executions of camp inmates. Executed on 26 November 1948. The only defendant of the 19 in the Dora Trial to receive a death sentence.
- Joachim Peiper: Ex SS-Standartenführer and commander of the 1st SS-Panzerregiment/"Kampfgruppe Peiper" during the Battle of the Bulge. Condemned to death on 16 July 1946 for his role in the Malmedy massacre. Sentence was subsequently commuted to life imprisonment and later to time served, following an investigation conducted by the U.S. Senate Armed Services Committee which concluded that improper pre-trial procedures by U.S. authorities had unfairly affected the trial process. Released from prison in December 1956. Died from asphyxiation on 14 July 1976 after communist arsonists discovered his identity and set his house on fire.
- Alexander Piorkowski: Ex SS-Sturmbannführer and commandant of Dachau concentration camp (1940–1942). Executed on 22 October 1948.
- Hermann Pister: Ex SS-Oberführer and commandant of Buchenwald concentration camp (1942–1945). Condemned to death in August 1947 but died in prison of a heart attack on 28 September 1948 before the sentence could be carried out.
- Claus Schilling: Former civilian medical specialist at Dachau concentration camp (1942–1945). Sentenced to death on 13 December 1945 for his involvement in medical experimentation on camp inmates. Executed on 28 May 1946.

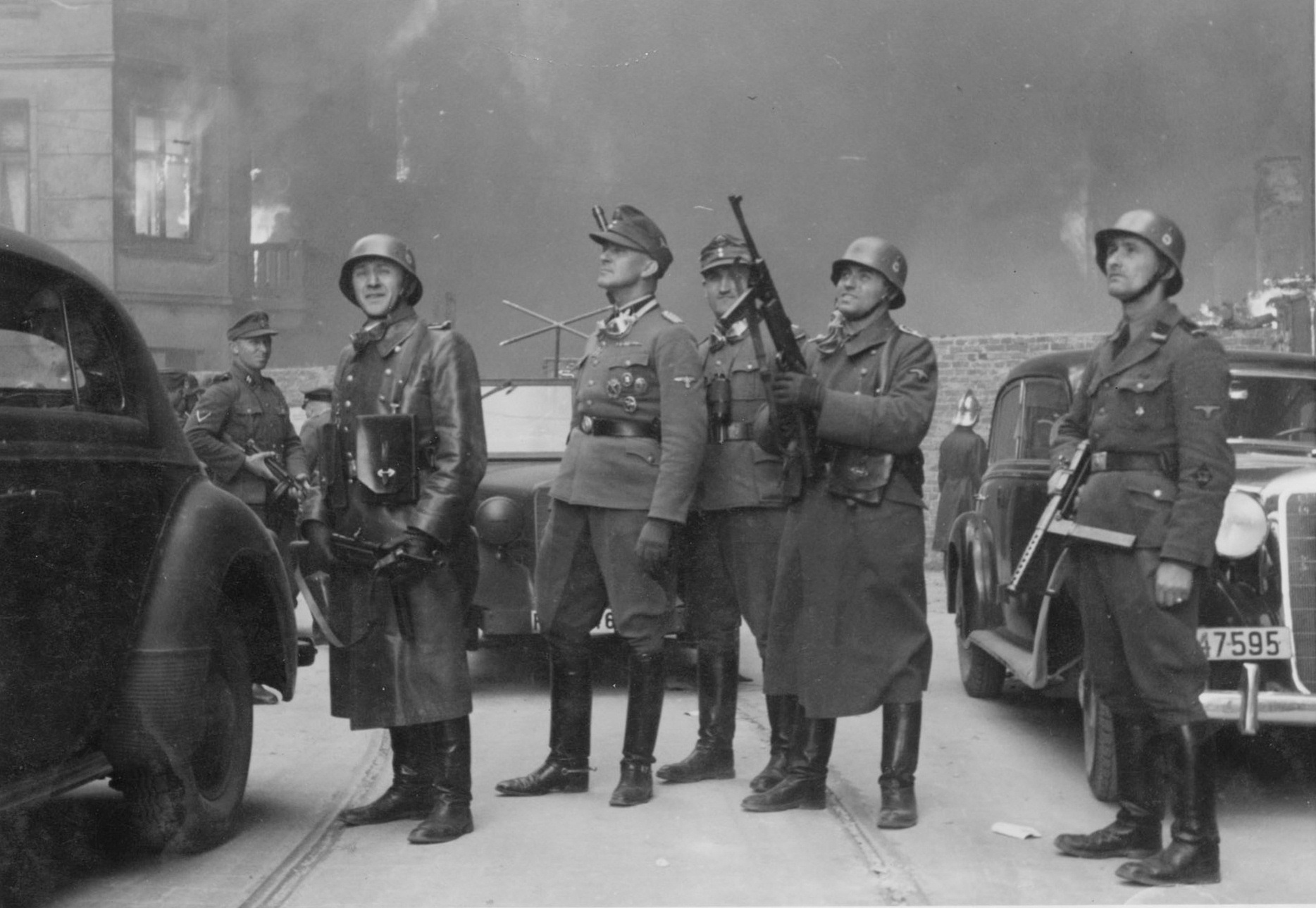
Jürgen Stroop (center, in field cap) with his men in the burning Warsaw Ghetto, 1943

- Jürgen Stroop: Ex SS-Gruppenführer. Sentenced to death on 21 March 1947 for ordering the summary execution of captured Allied airmen. Later extradited to Poland to stand trial for his role in the liquidation of the Warsaw Ghetto. Condemned to death by Polish authorities on 23 July 1951 and executed in Mokotów Prison in Warsaw on 6 March 1952.
- Erich Wasicky: Ex SS-Hauptsturmführer and medical officer in the Mauthausen-Gusen concentration camp system (1941–1945). Oversaw the establishment and operation of the gas chambers in the Mauthausen main camp and the satellite camp of Hartheim. Sentenced to death on 13 May 1946 and executed on 28 May 1947.
- Martin Gottfried Weiss: Ex SS-Obersturmbannführer in the Dachau concentration camp system. Served twice as commandant of the Dachau main camp (1942–1943 and April 1945). Also commanded the satellite-camp of Mühldorf (1944–1945). Sentenced to death on 13 December 1945 for atrocities committed during his first command at Dachau, which included the initial construction and use of the camp's gas chamber and human experimentation conducted using camp inmates. Executed on 29 May 1946.
- Fritz Dietrich: Former SS police chief of Liepāja. Responsible for ordering the Liepāja massacres. Sentenced to death for the illegal executions of 7 American airmen. Executed on 22 October 1948.

== Acquitted defendants ==
- Georg Johannes Rickhey: Former senior official with the Reich Ministry for Armaments and War Production (1942–1945) and director of the Mittelwerk GmbH munitions facility located in Mittelbau-Dora (1944–1945), where he oversaw V-weapons production. Arrested by the United States Army in May 1945 and later brought to Wright-Patterson Air Force Base in Dayton, Ohio and employed under the terms of Operation Paperclip. Subsequently indicted by U.S. authorities in August 1947 for his alleged involvement in war crimes at Mittelbau-Dora, including the use of forced labor, collaboration with the SS and Gestapo, and responsibility for the catastrophic working conditions at Mittelwerk. Acquitted due to lack of evidence on 30 December 1947. Died 1966.
- Heinrich Schmidt: Ex SS-Hauptsturmführer and medical officer in the Dachau and Mittelbau-Dora concentration camps. Indicted by US authorities in August 1947 for suspected war crimes committed during his service as chief physician of the Nordhausen sub-camp of Mittelbau-Dora (March–April 1945). Acquitted due to insufficient evidence on 30 December 1947. Later indicted at the Third Majdanek trial by the District Court of Düsseldorf in November 1975 for alleged crimes against humanity perpetrated during his service as a medical officer in the Majdanek concentration camp (1942–1943). Again acquitted due to lack of evidence on 20 March 1979, after what became the longest and most expensive criminal trial in German history. Died 2000.
- Otto Skorzeny: Ex SS-Obersturmbannführer and commander of SS-Panzer Brigade 150 during the Battle of the Bulge. Indicted by U.S. authorities in August 1947 for allegedly violating the Hague Convention of 1907 stemming from his leadership of Operation Greif, a false flag operation in which German troops infiltrated Allied lines in the Ardennes forest while wearing British and US Army uniforms and using captured Allied vehicles. Acquitted of all charges on 9 September 1947. Died 1975.

== Post–war political aftermath ==
After the verdicts, the manner in which the court had functioned was disputed, first in Germany (by former Nazi officials who had regained some power due to anti-Communist positions with the occupation forces), then later in the United States, including by Senator Joseph McCarthy. The case was appealed to the Supreme Court of the United States, which made no decision. The case then came under the scrutiny of a sub-committee of the United States Senate. This drew attention to the trial and the judicial irregularities that had occurred during the interrogations that preceded the trial. But, before the United States Senate took an interest in this case, most of the death sentences had been commuted, because of a revision of the trial carried out by the US Army. The other life sentences were commuted within the next few years. With the exception of one person who died in prison, all of those convicted in the Malmedy massacre trial were released during the 1950s, the last one to leave prison being Hubert Huber in January 1957.

A distinct case about the war crimes committed against civilians in Stavelot was tried on July 6, 1948, in front of a Belgian military court in Liège, Belgium. The defendants were 10 members of Kampfgruppe Peiper; American troops had captured them on December 22, 1944, near the spot where one of the massacres of civilians in Stavelot had occurred. One man was discharged; the others were found guilty. Most of the convicts were sentenced to 10 years' imprisonment; two officers were sentenced to 12 and 15 years.

Towards the end of his life, Joachim Peiper settled in Traves, Haute-Saône, in eastern France. In 1976 a Communist historian obtained the file on Joachim Peiper from the Gestapo document archive in East Germany, and used the information to denounce the presence of a Nazi war criminal living in France. In June 1976, there appeared political flyers denouncing the presence of SS-Obersturmbannführer Joachim Peiper in the village of Traves. Later, a newsmagazine article the left-wing L'Humanité identified Peiper's presence and residence in Traves, and he received threats of death. In the early morning of 14 July 1976, Peiper's house was set afire, and killed him.

== See also ==
- Adolf Eichmann trial
- Auschwitz trial
- Belsen trials
- Belzec trial before the 1st Munich District Court in the mid-1960s, of eight SS-men of the Belzec extermination camp
- Chełmno trials of the Chełmno extermination camp personnel, held in Poland and in Germany. The cases were decided almost twenty years apart
- Dora Trial
- Euthanasia trials
- Frankfurt Auschwitz trials
- Majdanek trials, the longest Nazi war crimes trial in history, spanning over 30 years
- Mauthausen-Gusen camp trials
- Nuremberg trials of the 23 most important leaders of the Third Reich, 1945–1946
- Ravensbrück trial
- Sobibor trial held in Hagen, Germany in 1965, concerning the Sobibor extermination camp personnel
- Stutthof trials
- Subsequent Nuremberg trials
- Treblinka trials in Düsseldorf, Germany

== Notes and references ==
- United States Law and Practice Concerning Trials of War Criminals by Military Commissions and Military Government Courts. United Nations War Crimes Commission.
