= Georg Rickhey =

German engineer (1898–1970)

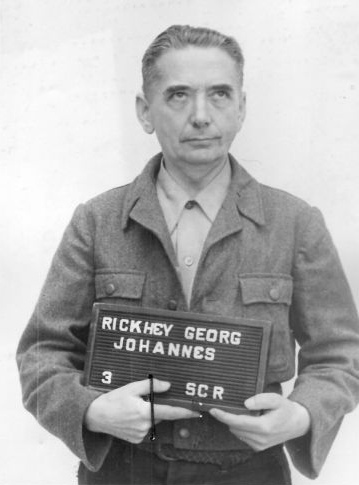
Georg Rickhey under arrest in June, 1947

Georg Johannes Rickhey (25 August 1898, Hildesheim – 21 November 1970, Essen) was a German engineer and the general director of Mittelwerk GmbH in Dora-Mittelbau.

Rickhey, a doctor of engineering, joined the Nazi Party in October 1931 as member number 664,050. From 1940, he guided Gauamt Technik in Essen and was promoted in 1942 to the leader of NSDAP Gau Essen and was also at the same time authorized officer in an Essen mining company.

During the Second World War he held a number of positions with the Reichsministerium für Bewaffnung und Munition (Reich Ministry for Armament and Munitions) before becoming manager of Demag, a tank production company, in 1942.

He became head of Mittelwerk GmbH in Dora-Mittelbau from April 1944, overseeing production of the V-1 flying bomb and V-2 rocket. His work on these weapons saw him awarded the Knights Cross of the War Merit Cross along with Walter Dornberger and Wernher von Braun.

Arrested in 1945, he was taken by the U.S. Army to live at Wright-Patterson Air Force Base, Ohio where he worked under the terms of Operation Paperclip. While at Wright Field Rickhey helped establish a smuggling operation, based on knowledge of black markets that he had gained in Nazi Germany. He was subsequently indicted as part of the Dachau Trials of 1947 under accusations that he had worked closely with the SS and Gestapo and witnessed executions. According to fellow scientists in Paperclip, Rickhey had bragged about killing slave laborers at Mittelwerk. In one instance, Rickhey was accused of helping hang 12 prisoners from a crane, after the laborers were accused of sabotaging rocket production.

American Air Force colonel Donald L. Putt was aware of the allegations against Rickhey but sought to suppress them, since they were potentially damaging to Rickhey's ongoing research in the United States and to Operation Paperclip. At trial, Rickhey was acquitted due to a lack of evidence. Rickhey returned to Wright-Patterson Air Force Base after the trial ended. He did not return to his work in Operation Paperclip.

Rickey built Hitler's underground bunker in Berlin and drew up the initial plans for "Site R" -- the Alternate National Military Command Center at the Raven Rock Mountain Complex in Maryland.

== See also ==
- Dora Trial
