= Karl Kahr =

Nazi concentration camp doctor

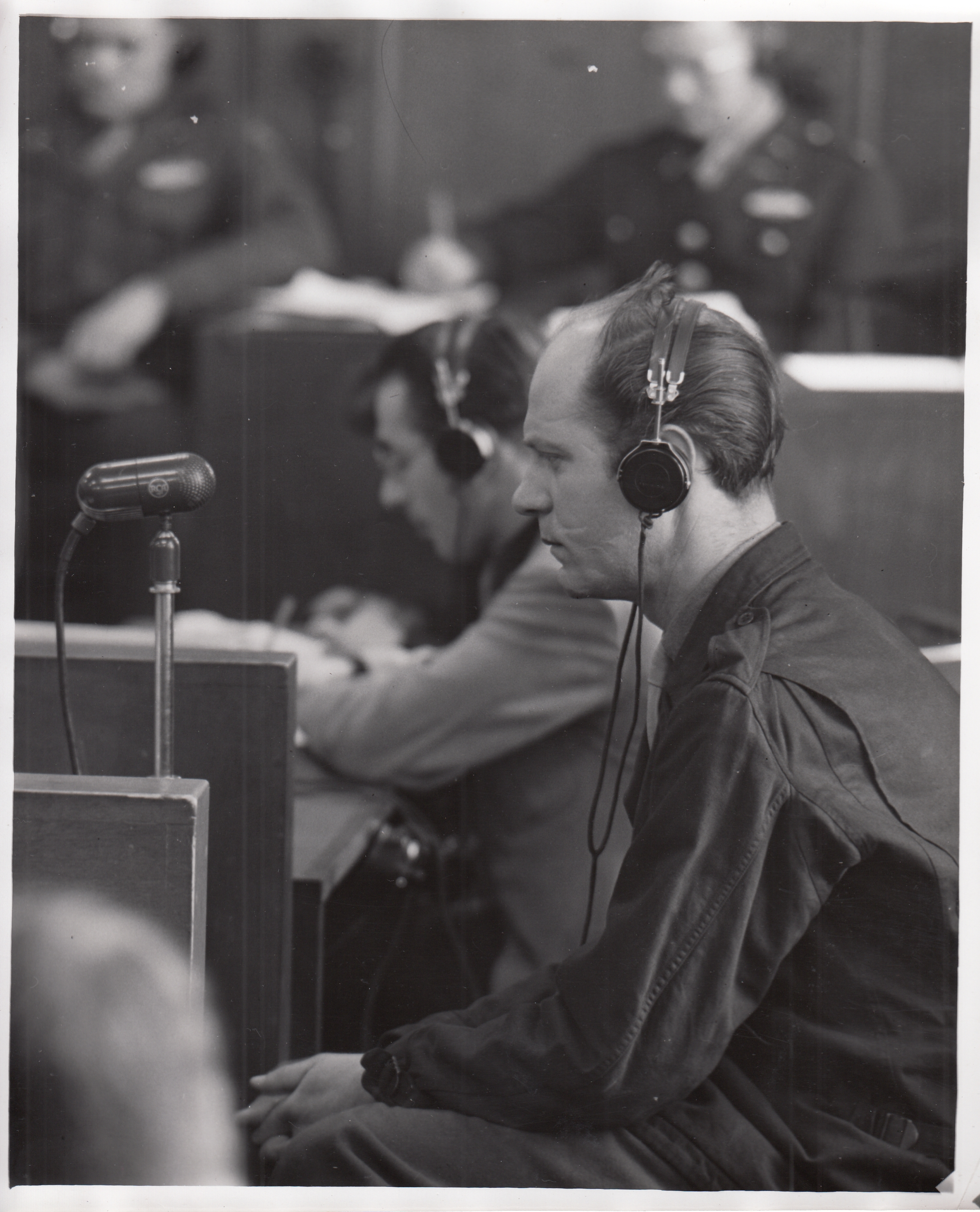
Karl Kahr, member of Waffen SS, was a camp doctor at Dachau and Dora Concentration Camps describing the conditions at the camp during the Pohl' Trial Date between 1947 and 1949

Karl Kahr (German pronunciation: [kaʁl ˈkaːɐ̯]; 11 September 1914 in Fürstenfeld – 13 May 2007 in Graz) was an Austrian SS-Hauptsturmführer and physician. During World War II, he was Chief Medical Officer of the Mittelbau-Dora concentration camp between January 1944 and February 1945.

== Biography ==
Kahr was born in the town of Fürstenfeld in southeastern Austria, which was then part of the Habsburg Empire. He studied medicine at the University of Graz and later worked as an assistant physician in a local hospital. During this time, Austria was annexed by Nazi Germany in the Anschluss of March 1938. Upon receiving his doctorate in 1940, Kahr enlisted in the Waffen-SS (SS # 382463) as a medical officer. After being seriously wounded on the Eastern Front, he was assigned to Prague, Czechoslovakia where he taught at a training school for combat paramedics. He later served as a staff physician at military hospitals in Brno, Graz, and Breslau.

In November 1942, Kahr was transferred to the Dachau concentration camp where he served as director of its tuberculosis research station, before being named SS-Lagerarzt (Camp Doctor) at Mittelbau-Dora in January 1944. During his time at Dora, Kahr developed a good reputation among the camp’s inmates both for his competence and his efforts to improve conditions for the prisoners under his care. In February 1945, he was replaced at Dora by Eduard Wirths and was briefly reassigned to the Gross-Rosen concentration camp in Lower Silesia.

Following the German surrender in May 1945, Kahr spent several months in American military detention. Due to his reputable standing with many former prisoners of Mittelbau-Dora, he was not among those indicted for war crimes by US occupation authorities during the 1947 Dora Trial, and appeared as a key witness for the prosecution in that proceeding as well as at the Pohl Trial the following year. After his release from US custody, Kahr returned to Graz where he resumed the practice of medicine.
