= List of subcamps of Mittelbau =

Konzentrationslager Mittelbau
- Location: Nordhausen, Germany
- Opened: November 1, 1944
- Closed: May 1, 1945
- Managed by: Schutzstaffel

The list of subcamps of Mittelbau identifies locations of Konzentrationslager (English: concentration camp) Mittelbau (Central Construction). The location of the KZ Mittelbau headquarters was originally only the Block 17/3 Buchenwald subcamp, but at the end of September 1944 the SS administration ordered the camp to become the center of a complex separate from the Buchenwald concentration camp. KZ Mittelbau became operational on November 1, 1944 with 32,471 prisoners.

1. Alfred
2. Artern
3. Ballenstedt
4. Blankenburg
5. Dora
6. Ellrich
7. Großwerther
8. Harzungen
9. Hohlstedt
10. Ilfield
11. Ilsenburg
12. Kelbra
13. Kleinbodungen
14. Langenstein-Zwieberge
15. Niedersachswerfen
16. Nordhausen (Boelcke-Kaserne)
17. Osterode am Harz
18. Rossla
19. Rottleberode
20. Salza/Thüringen
21. Sangerhausen
22. Sollstedt
23. Wieda
24. Woffleben

Construction labor teams that detained Poles

1. Baubrigade 4
2. Baubrigade 7
3. Baubrigade I
4. Baubrigade III
5. Baubrigade IV
6. Baubrigade V - West
7. Baubrigade VI
