= Mittelwerk =

German WWII underground rocket factory

- Nordhausen, Thuringia
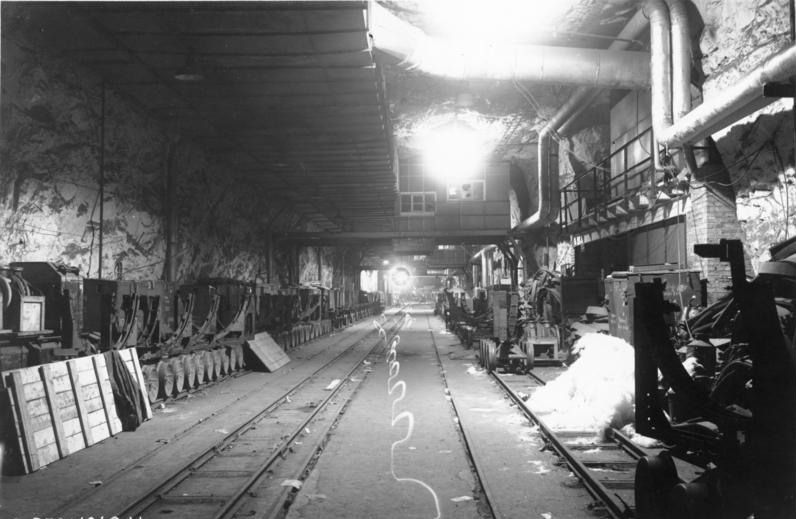
- Interior of the tunnels

Site information
- Type: Subterranean bunker
- Open to the public: Museum in the southern part of Tunnel A

Location
- Coordinates: 51.5348°N 10.751°E

Site history
- Built: Completed 1943
- Built by: Mittelwerk GmbH
- In use: 1943–1945

Mittelwerk ([ˈmɪtl̩.vɛʁk]; German for "Central Works") was a German World War II factory built underground in the Kohnstein to avoid Allied bombing. It used slave labor from the Mittelbau-Dora concentration camp to produce V-2 ballistic missiles, V-1 flying bombs, and other weapons.

== Mittelwerk GmbH ==
On the night of 17/18 August 1943, RAF bombers carried out Operation Hydra against the Peenemünde Army Research Center where V-2 development and production was being carried out.

On 19 October 1943, the German limited company Mittelwerk GmbH was issued War Contract No. 0011-5565/43 by General Emil Leeb, head of the Army Weapons Office, for 12,000 A-4 missiles at 40,000 Reichsmarks each.

Mittelwerk GmbH also headed sites for V-2 rocket development and testing at Schlier (Project Zement) and Lehesten. Beginning in May 1944, Georg Rickhey was the Mittelwerk general manager, Albin Sawatzki was the Mittelwerk technical director over both Arthur Rudolph's Technical Division (with deputy Karl Seidenstuecker) and Hans Lindenberg's 50 engineers of the quality control group located at Ilfeld. Other Mittelwerk/Ilfield engineers included Magnus von Braun in turbopump production, Guenther Haukohl who supervised V-2 production after helping design the assembly line, Eric Ball (assembly line), Hans Fridrich, Hans Palaoro and Rudolf Schlidt. The facility had a communications staff under Captain Dr Kühle, an Administrative Division run by Börner under Mittelwerk board member Otto Karl Bersch, and a Prisoner Labor Supply office (Brozsat). Hannelore Bannasch was Sawatzki's secretary. Wernher von Braun, who was involved in the planning of the facility, initially remained in Peenemünde but was in charge of quality control at the Mittelwerk. He worked closely with both Sawatzki and Rudolph, and by his own admission visited the Mittelwerk "10 or 15 times" including an extended stay during the hellish construction period in the fall of 1943.

== Other projects ==
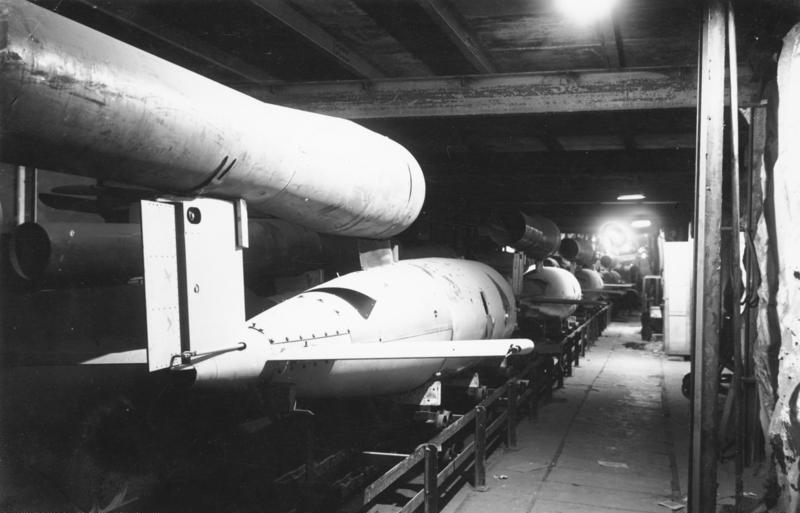
V-1 cruise missile assembly line at the Mittelwerk II underground facility

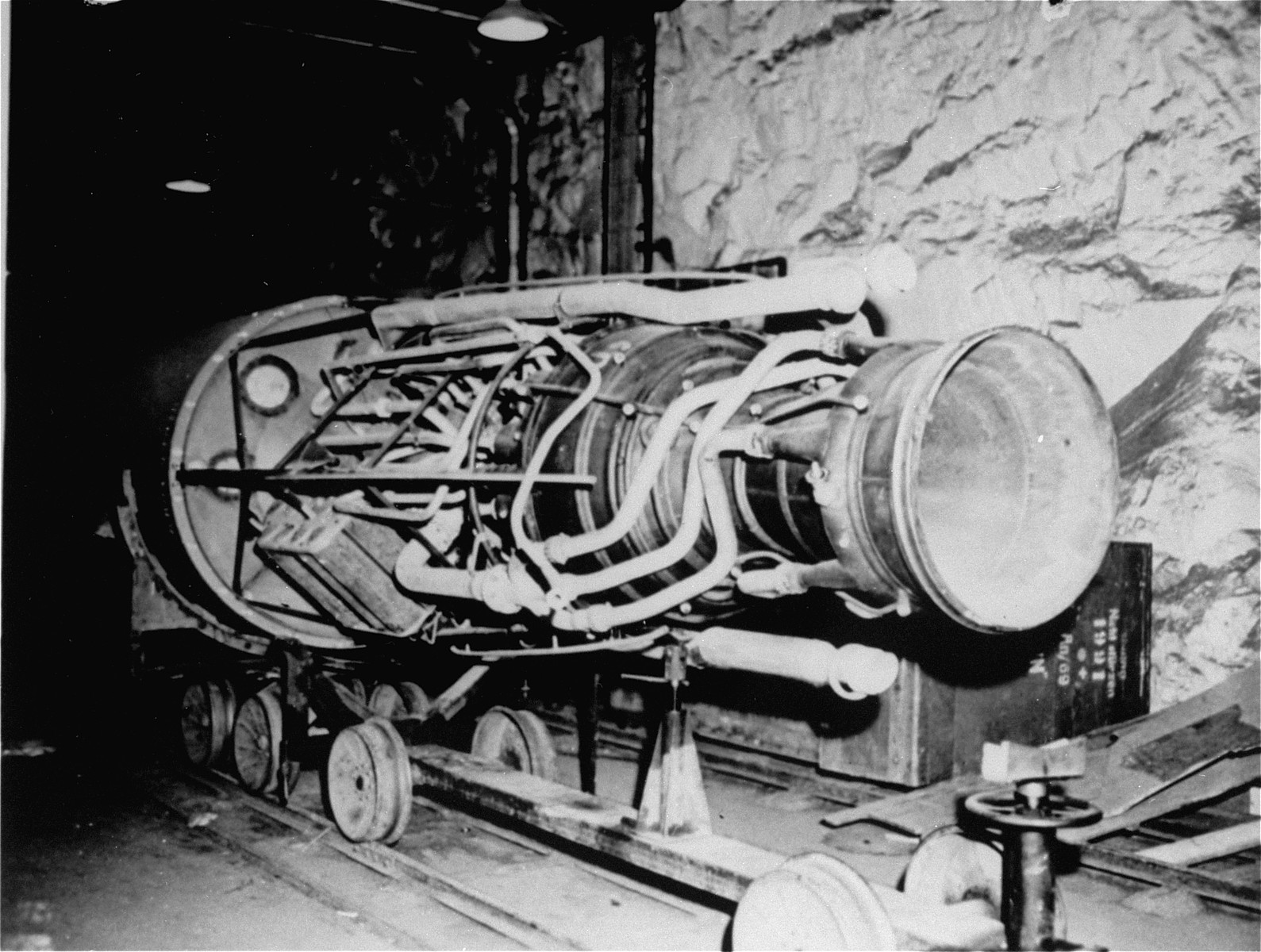
V-2 weapon in Mittelwerk after liberation

In July 1944, Hans Kammler ordered the North Works (Nordwerke) to use cross-tunnels 1–20 for a Junkers jet and piston engine factory, leaving cross-tunnels 21–46 for Mittelwerk GmbH. During February–April 1945, the Nordhausen plant built Taifun anti-aircraft missiles and Heinkel He 162 jet fighters and put into operation a liquid oxygen plant. The plant was the Eber project and used equipment evacuated from the Watten bunker and elsewhere to build Heylandt liquid oxygen generators; the 15 generators were nearly complete when the site was captured. The Mittelwerk also contained equipment for producing jet fuel, and in an emergency 1944 decentralization program (named Geilenbergprogramm after Edmund Geilenberg) started the "Cuckoo" project, an underground oil plant to be "carved out of the Himmelsburg" North of the Mittelwerk. In early February 1945, Wernher von Braun and his team moved from Peenemünde to Bleicherode where, under Hans Kammler's orders, he was responsible for weapons production at multiple underground sites, some operational and others still on the drawing board. Most were never completed. For example, plans for V-2 rocket plants (the Southern Works near Friedrichshafen and the Eastern Works near Riga) were never fulfilled.

V-1 flying bomb assembly began during October/November 1944 in the South end of tunnel A. At the end of January 1945, 51 V-1s were shipped from a dispersed Fieseler factory in Upper Bavaria (code name Cham) to the Nordhausen plant for completion. After a second V-1 factory at Burg was closed, the Mittelwerk Werk II in February 1945 was the only factory producing V-1 flying bombs, and a total of 2,275 V-1s were built by Werk II from September 1944 until April 1945.

Although there has long been speculation about other "exotic" weaponry being constructed or stored at Mittelwerk, evidence of this is circumstantial at best. For example, Richard Overy notes in The Bombing War - Europe 1939-1945 (2013): "There is some evidence that small spherical bombs containing radioactive waste were stored in the Mittelbau-Dora works [...], but it is not conclusive."

== Evacuation ==
In late February 1945, the Allied Chiefs of Staff discussed a proposed attack on the Nordhausen plant with a highly flammable petroleum-soap mixture that had been used in the Pacific theatre to deeply penetrate buried strongpoints and scourge them with intense heat. The area was attacked with conventional bombs by RAF Bomber Command on 3 & 4 April. What were believed to be barracks were attacked on 3 April but they actually contained forced labour workers. The attack of 4 April hit the barracks and the town of Nordhausen. The Mittelbau-Dora forced labor camp was evacuated on 4 April, and scientists evacuated to the Alpenfestung (English: Alpine Fortress). Hitler had made an order, the "Demolitions on Reich Territory Decree", which ordered the destruction of any infrastructure that might be of use to the Allies but it was deliberately ignored by Albert Speer and the Nordhausen plant was evacuated without damage.

== Aftermath ==
Fedden Mission

The Mission had been told that Nordhausen was a large underground factory, and that they would see extraordinary production methods, but they had no idea that they would be brought face-to-face with such an undertaking. The reaction of the Mission to this visit ... was one of the utmost revulsion and disgust. This factory is the epitome of megalomaniac production and robot efficiency and layout. Everything was ruthlessly executed with utter disregard for humanitarian considerations. The record of Nordhausen is a most unenviable one, and we were told that 250 of the slave workers perished every day, due to overwork and malnutrition. Some of the Mission visited a slave workers' encampment, talked to a Dutch doctor who had been there throughout the war, and saw many of the wretched inmates, who were in an appalling state, although receiving every medical attention now. They also saw stretchers heavily saturated in blood, a room in which there was a slab on which the bodies were drained of blood, and the incinerators in which the bodies were burnt. These are all facts which require to be seen to be fully appreciated. This terrible and devilish place has now passed into Russian hands and it is sincerely hoped that our allies will deal with it in a proper and adequate manner.

— Report of 19 June 1945 site inspection.

Having been warned to "expect something a little unusual in the Nordhausen area", and after previously entering the Nordhausen plant from the North through the Junkers Nordwerke, U.S. 3rd Armored Division and 104th Infantry Divisions reached the city of Nordhausen on 11 April 1945 and discovered the dead and sick of the Boelcke Kaserne barracks.

Casualties of the V-2 rocket are estimated at 2,541 killed and 5,923 injured. By contrast, of the roughly 60,000 people who passed through Mittelbau-Dora and its subcamps, an estimated 20,000 died either at the camp or at places they were subsequently transported to: 350 were hanged (including 200 for sabotage), many others died from exhaustion, cold, malnutrition or disease. Some were murdered by guards. The total also includes 1,300 to 1,500 prisoners killed by British bombs in early April.

=== Special Mission V-2 ===
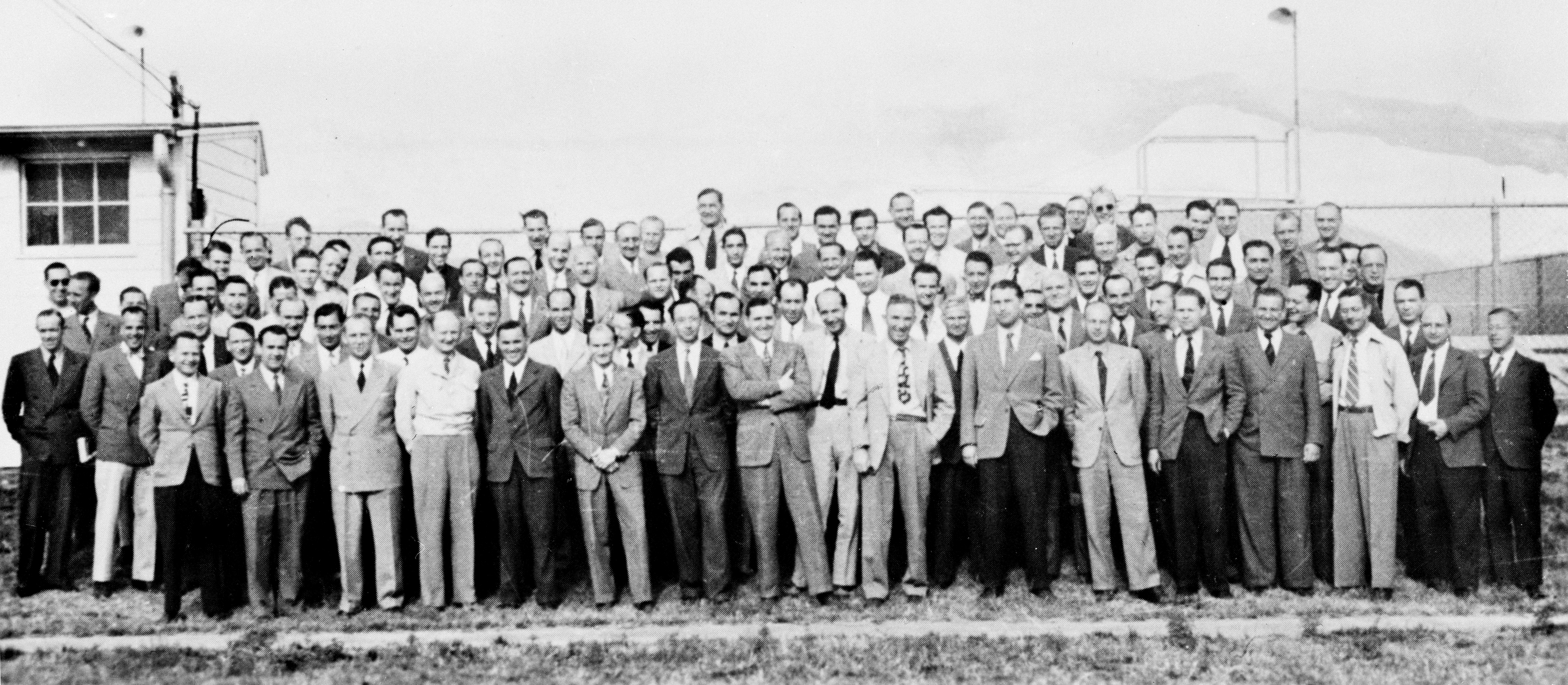
A few of these Operation Paperclip scientists had been at the Mittelwerk.

On 22 May 1945, US Army Special Mission V-2 shipped the first trainload of rocket parts for use in projects such as Operation Sandy, Operation Blossom and, at the White Sands Proving Grounds, the Hermes project. The Nordhausen area was to become part of the Soviet zone of occupation, and Soviet Army officers arrived to tour the Nordhausen plant on 26 May 1945. In June 1945, the US Army left the Nordhausen plant as required by JCS Directive 1067/14, with parts, documents (including blueprints for the projected A-9/A-10 intercontinental missile) left for the Soviets. The Red Army occupied the Mittelwerk on 5 July 1945 and demolished both of the entrances of the tunnel system in mid-1948.

=== The Dora War Crimes Trial ===
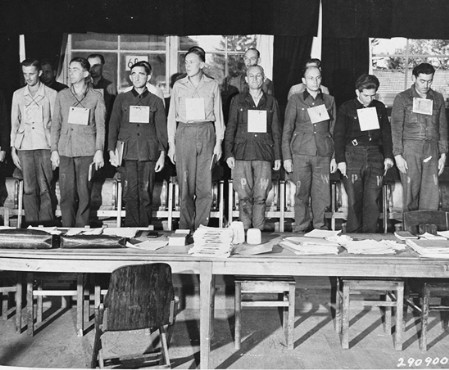
Sixteen of the 19 Dora Defendants in 1947

The 1947 Dora Trial convicted SS Officers and concentration camp kapos, while three scientists of the V-2 rocket program were implicated (two after the trial) and exonerated of Nazi war crimes at the Mittelwerk. On 19 May 1947, the former head of the Mittelwerk facility, Georg Rickhey, was extradited to Germany from Wright Field in the U.S. and acquitted of war crimes at the Dora Trial. Arthur Rudolph, after immigrating to the U.S. and playing key roles in the Pershing missile and Apollo programs, was forced to renounce his U.S. citizenship and return to Germany; the West German government, citing the statute of limitations, never charged him and eventually granted him citizenship. Wernher von Braun, the Technical Director of a separate facility at Peenemünde Army Research Center, visited the Mittelwerk on 25 January 1944, and a 1991 author alleged he witnessed Mittelwerk and Buchenwald war crimes.

=== Ruins ===
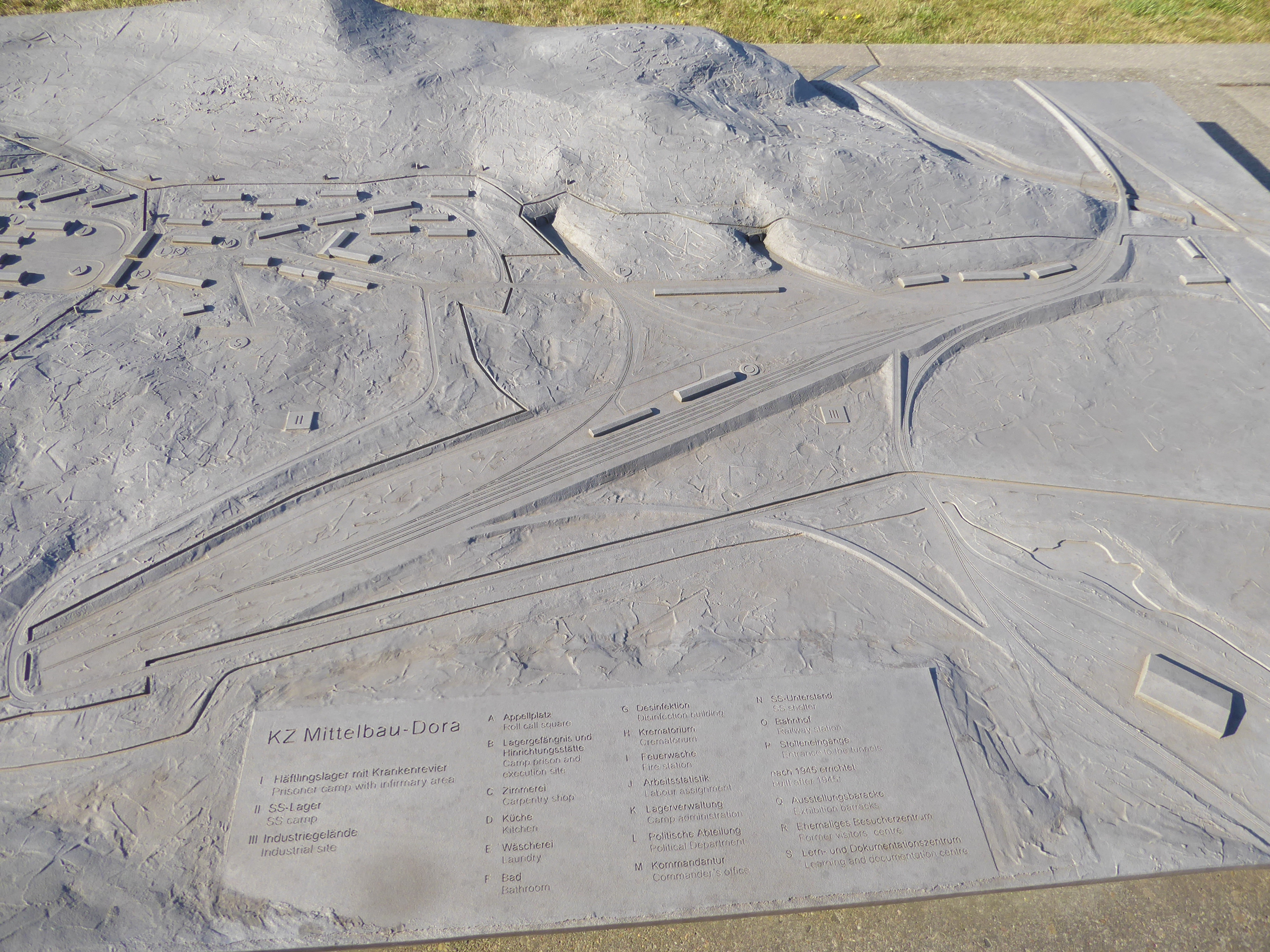
2020 07 29 model of KZ Mittelbau-Dora on site, showing tunnels A and B at top

After a new entrance tunnel had been dug to former rail Tunnel A in 1995, 710 meters of the tunnel system were opened for visitors. Large parts of the system are flooded by ground water, while other parts have collapsed. After the reunification of Germany the tunnels were frequently looted by treasure seekers who gained access via the private mine in the north of the Kohnstein.

Willi Kramer, a German archaeologist and scientist who dived in the tunnel system in 1992 and 1998, estimated that 70 tons of material was stolen. Access through these entrances was not secured until 2004, when the mine went into insolvency.

== See also ==
- Kőbánya cellar system – a former underground quarry and tunnel complex in Hungary which was used as an aircraft assembly factory during World War II
- Project Riese
- V-2 rocket facilities of World War II
