= Melk concentration camp =

Sub-camp of Mauthausen concentration camp (1944–1945)

Melk labor camp
- Concentration camp – forced labor subcamp
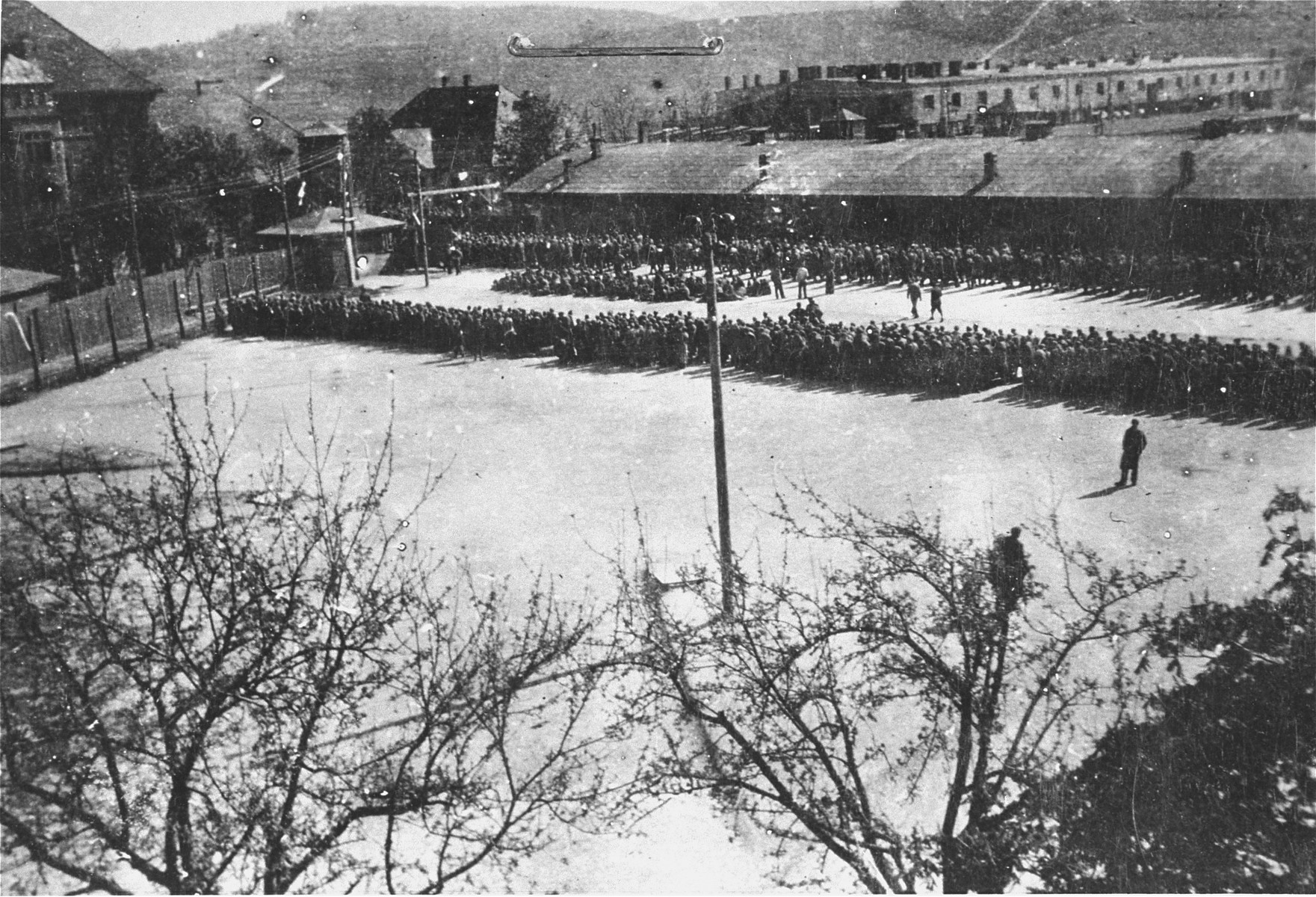
- New arrivals at Melk, a subcamp of Mauthausen, being counted, 1944
- Coordinates: 48.22647°N 15.34996°E
- Location: Melk
- Commandant: Anton Streitwieser
- Operational: January 11, 1944 - May 5, 1945
- Number of inmates: 14,390
- Killed: 4,896
- Liberated by: Red Army, May 5, 1945

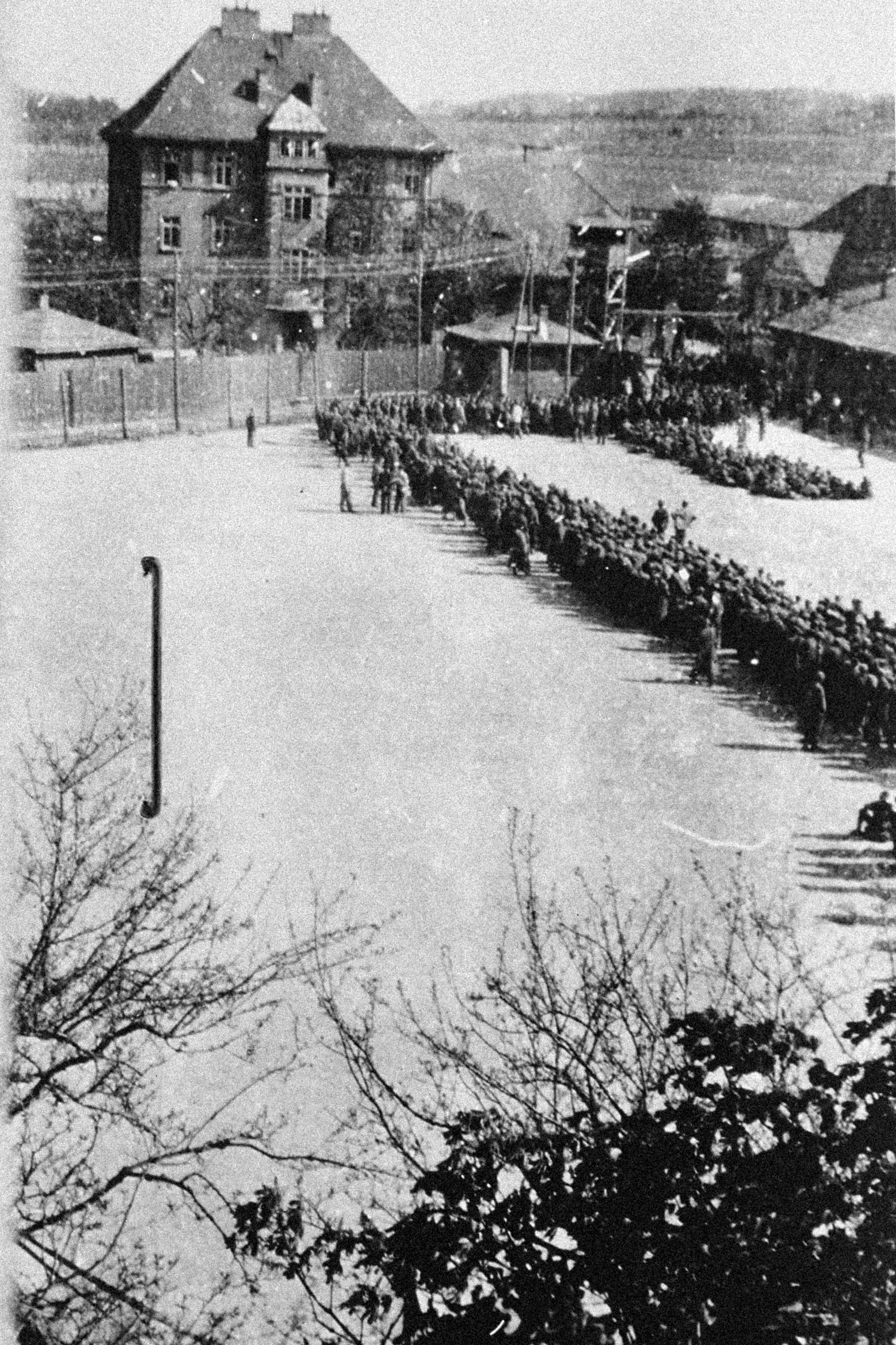
Melk's roll calling place

Melk concentration camp (also called Melk labor camp and KZ Melk, A.K.Me.) was a forced labor unit for men in the Mauthausen concentration camp in Mauthausen, Upper Austria. Prisoners there were forced to construct an underground ball-bearing factory for the Steyr-Daimler-Puch AG company. Prisoners were also constructed various barracks in the region and the "Luftwaffe colony" in Loosdorf. Other prisoners were forced to work at the Hopferwieser ST & A Sawmill (now Umdasch) in Amstetten, which produced pit props for underground installations. The camp was established on January 11, 1944. Approximately 14,390 prisoners were transported to Melk, where at least 4,896 perished. The camp was liberated on May 5, 1945.

In January 1944, a Kommando of Mauthausen concentration camp was established in Melk, Lower Austria, in the former abandoned barracks of the Wehrmacht pioneers Freiherr von Birago, then located in the Reichsgau Niederdonau, about 100 km east of Linz. An initial detachment of approximately 500 prisoners arrived on April 11, 1944, to prepare the facilities for up to 7,000 inmates. The camp officially opened on April 20 and 21, 1944.

The prisoners were housed in 18 blocks, some of which were equipped with military equipment recovered from the Wehrmacht. The Quarz GmbH company, responsible for the forced labor operation, supplied beds, straw bags, and blankets. Initially, the camp had relatively better facilities than many other concentration camps, but this situation quickly deteriorated due to overcrowding and catastrophic sanitary conditions.

In total, 14,390 prisoners from at least 26 countries were held in the Melk Kommando. The camp's initial capacity of 7,000 prisoners was not reached until mid-September 1944.Prisoners evacuated from the main Natzweiler camp were transferred there, followed starting in January 1945 by deportees arriving from Auschwitz. According to historian Hans Maršálek, the camp reached its peak population on January 30, 1945, with 10,352 inmates.

Beginning in September 1944, prisoners evacuated from the main Natzweiler-Struthof concentration camp were transferred to Melk, followed from January 1945 by deportees from Auschwitz. According to historian Hans Maršálek, the camp reached its maximum capacity on January 30, 1945, with 10,352 prisoners.

The main national groups consisted of Poles, Hungarians, French, Soviet citizens, Germans, Italians, Greeks, and Yugoslavs. Prisoners from other countries, including Albania, Egypt, Denmark, Portugal, Turkey, and the United States, were also interned there. Approximately 30% of the prisoners were Jewish.

The last transport of prisoners arrived on January 29, 1945, from Auschwitz and included 2,000 people, including 119 children aged 9 to 15. A crematorium was built in the autumn of 1944; between December 1944 and April 1945, more than 3,500 bodies were cremated there.

Transport documents indicate that 1,440 sick or wounded prisoners were returned to the main camp at Mauthausen as they were considered unfit for work (arbeitsunfähig). The death register kept by the camp doctor recorded 4,802 deaths at Melk, including 1,019 in January 1945 alone, over 30 deaths per day. Approximately one-third of the prisoners transferred to Melk died within the first six months of being at the camp.

SS statistics indicate the nationalities of the dead as follows: 1,575 Poles; 1,432 Hungarians; 546 French; 388 Soviet citizens; 302 Italians; 174 Yugoslavs; 150 Germans and Austrians; 101 Greeks; 36 Estonians, Latvians and Lithuanians; 26 Dutch; 22 Czechs; 17 Norwegians; 12 Spaniards; 9 Belgians; 3 Swiss; 4 Luxembourgers; 2 Turks; 1 Portuguese; 1 Albanian; and 1 stateless person.

== Mauthausen concentration camp ==
The Mauthausen concentration camp was built in August 1938 on the hills above the town of Mauthausen, Austria. In May 1940, a subcamp was opened in Gusen, a few kilometers away. The concentration camp complex continued to expand, becoming a sorting and transfer center for prisoners sent to external camps (see List of the 46 subcamps of Mauthausen).

As the war progressed, the exploitation of forced labor in the concentration camps became a priority, resulting in the proliferation of subcamps dependent on the main camp. To support the Reich's war effort, the SS leased prisoners to factories such as Steyr-Daimler-Puch AG, Reichswerke Hermann Goering, Heinkel Flugzeugwerke, Porsche GmbH, and Solvay GmbH.

From late 1943 onward, Allied strategic bombing raids forced German authorities to relocate key industrial and military activities to camouflaged sites, including mines, bunkers, and tunnels. The construction of these facilities mobilised thousands of prisoners who worked under inhumane living conditions. Due to the damage inflicted by Allied raids, numerous Kommandos (work details) were deployed to clear debris, repair infrastructure, and construct emergency shelters.

== Quartz Project ==
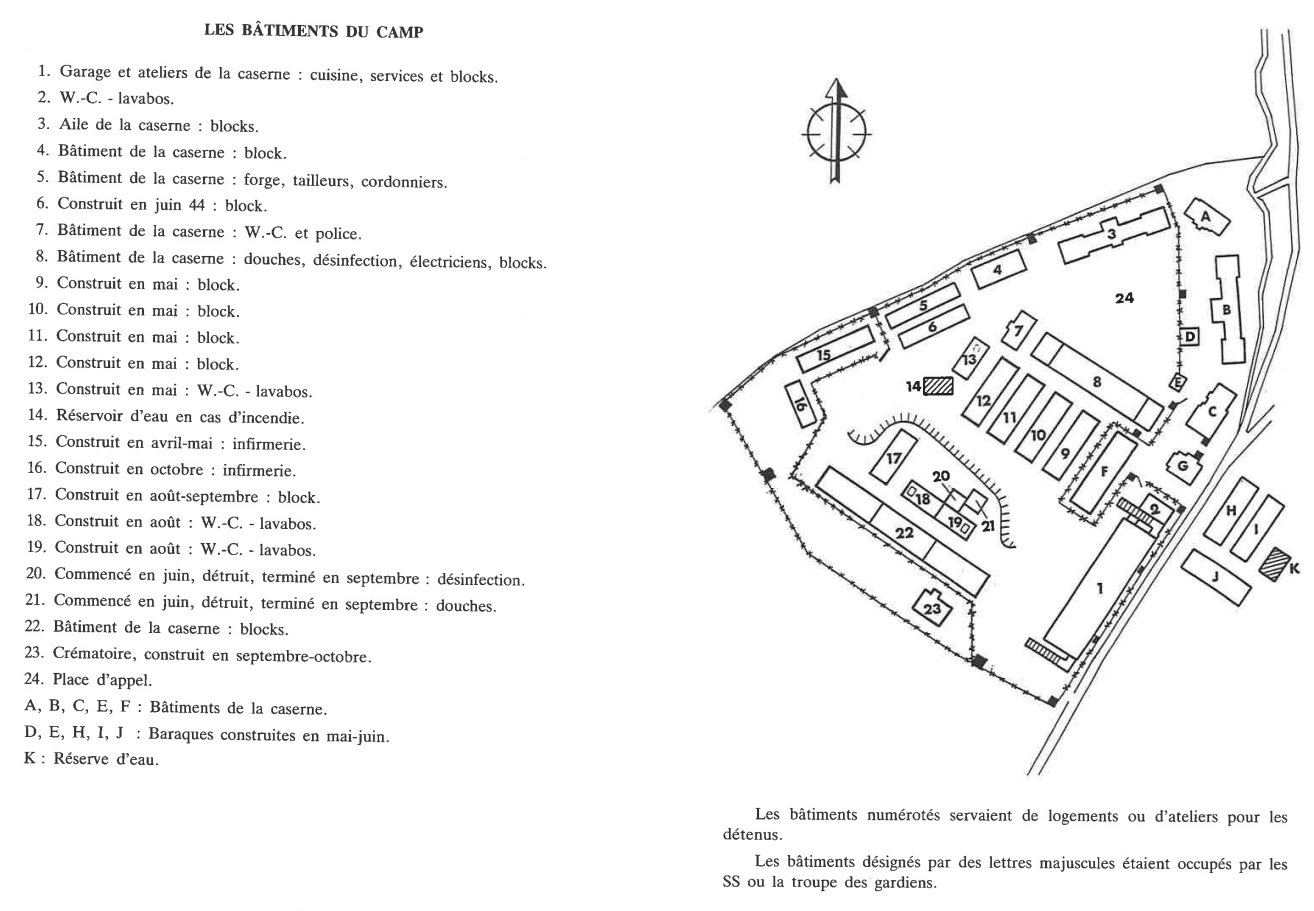
Map of Melk concentration camp

On February 8, 1944, Josef Stini presented a "geological report concerning the construction of alternative parts in the Wachberge near Melk". In April 1944, a subcamp of the Mauthausen concentration camp was established in Melk, in a military barracks evacuated due to the advance of Soviet forces and the threat of Allied bombing from Italy. This camp was intended to provide slave labor for the construction of an underground ball-bearing production plant for the Steyr-Daimler-Puch AG company. Although the initial plan called for the use of 20,000 prisoners, 14,400 prisoners were assigned to Melk during the following year, of whom approximately 7,000 worked permanently on the construction site from July 1944. The deportees, leased by the SS to industrial companies, constituted the main workforce assigned to earthworks and construction, while a constant stream of new arrivals compensated for human losses caused by the extremely harsh working and detention conditions.

== Camp governance ==
Two hierarchies operated the camp: that of the SS and guards, and that of the prisoners. The SS implemented Nazi directives, while the prisoner hierarchy enforced these rules among the inmates with a level of harshness and inhumanity comparable to that of SS officers.

=== SS personnel ===
No fewer than about ten SS men were stationed in the camp, yet this small number was sufficient to maintain a climate of terror. They were aided by members of the Luftwaffe and by certain prisoners who were weak or compliant.

The first Lagerführer was Anton Streitwieser, a young Hauptsturmführer (SS captain). He was reportedly more interested in amusement, even at the expense of prisoners' lives, than in enforcing work. He was sentenced to life imprisonment in 1967 and died in prison in 1972.

In May 1944, Streitwieser was replaced by another SS captain, Julius Ludolph, who had previously been deemed too harsh at the Loibl Pass by the engineers and company executives. Ludolph remained in his post until the end of the camp's operation. According to accounts, he was not very intelligent, and prisoners such as Hermann Hofstädt and Antonin Pichon were sometimes able to manipulate him, though at great personal risk. Pichon suffered a memorable beating during roll call. Ludolph was tried at the Mauthausen trial, sentenced to death in May 1946 and hanged in Landsberg am Lech in May 1947.

The Rapportführer, responsible for presenting personnel at each roll call, was Oberscharführer (Feldwebel) Curt Jansen. The Arbeitdienstführer was SS Feldwebel Ernst Schindler, who oversaw work in conjunction with Antonin Pichon. Hauptscharführer Otto Striegel managed the camp's food supply, from the train station to the kitchen. He was convicted at the Mauthausen trial in May 1946 and hanged in Landsberg am Lech a year later. In June and July 1944, another SS member, known as Willy, a former seminarian, was assigned to supervise the kitchen exits.

In the infirmary "Revier", SS Sergeant Gottlieb Muzikant exercised considerable abuse toward sick prisoners. Muzikant had previously worked as a house painter and served as an SS medic. In 1960, he was sentenced by the Fulda Regional Court to 21 terms of life imprisonment for the murder of 90 seriously ill prisoners by phenol injection and for the strangulation of at least 100 other prisoners.

Each block had its Blockführer, and each commando had a Kommandoführer. SS men filled some of these positions, but many were held by prisoners recruited from the camp's rank and file. Those supervising camp labor commandos were often particularly brutal.

=== Guards ===
Five hundred soldiers of the Luftwaffe (the Nazi air force) were responsible for external surveillance of the camp. In the autumn of 1944, control of these guards was transferred to the Waffen-SS . Officially, they were not allowed to enter the camp itself. The Luftwaffe soldiers carried out guard duties from watchtowers surrounding the camp, along the sentry cordon, and near various work detachments. They also escorted the camp's work details to and from their work sites. Guards' duties frequently involved physically assaulting prisoners or shooting those who were deemed to have "attempted to escape", though in many cases these killings were deliberate.

Franz Höger, a former Wehrmacht platoon commander who had commanded a prisoner guard unit (ten-year prison sentence)

=== Lagerälteste ===
The prisoners were led and commanded by common criminals, for whom a man's life had little value. Over the months, the political prisoners learned to counter the common criminals.

The first Lagerälteste, the camp elder, was named Tony, a black triangle who was apparently not brutal enough: as early as June, he was replaced by Herbert Wernig, known as Bertl, who had a reputation for killing at the Mauthausen quarry. He had previously been the chief of police. He was a common criminal whom Ludolph respected because he was an old soldier. He ran the camp with a heavy hand, but not very intelligently.

In December, Wernig became head of Block XIV and was replaced as Lagerälteste by Henri Scherrer, a French political prisoner and non-commissioned officer in the Chasseurs Alpins (light infantry), who held the role until the camp's closure. Antonin Pichon had first appointed him head of Block XVII, populated by Russians who did not tolerate the injustice and corruption of the German block leaders. He ran the block with fairness, intelligence and firmness, which was enough to restore calm there. Antonin Pichon proposed him to Ludolph as the camp's senior officer, and he was accepted. This was a great victory for the "Politics".

Each block had a Blockälteste, each kommando, a Kapo.

Fidel Balbas and Uli Schmidt, both former kapos, were sentenced to death by a French military tribunal convened in Rastatt after being found guilty of murdering several of their fellow inmates during acts of extreme brutality.

== Resistance ==
The Schreibstube, the secretariat, was a highly effective clandestine counter-power. It was run by Berlin lawyer Hermann Hofstädt and French journalist André Ulmann, known as "Antonin Pichon". Hermann was the head of the secretariat, while "Tonin" was the secretary of the labor department: they allocated positions in the blocks and work details. Ludolph was powerless against them: they kept his secret accounts, because, like every SS man, he trafficked in gold, food and clothing, and the two men knew everything. They took advantage of this to manage both the economic and military Resistance, thereby fostering solidarity.

Several block leaders, secretaries, or kapos were appointed to counter the "common criminals". Among the block leaders were Henri Scherrer in Block V, then XVII, and Paul Scherrer in Block VIII. Among the secretaries: Charles Meyer in block II, Metty Dockendorf in block IV, and André Fougerousse in block XIV. It was not without danger: Tony, the first camp leader, was reassigned to distributing clothes, and Otto Baumgartner, secretary of the Revier, was sent to the disciplinary company.

== Prisoners ==
On April 21, 1944, the first group of 500 prisoners arrived: 420 French, 30 Spanish, and 30 Germans. Two days later, on April 23, 532 French prisoners from Mauthausen joined them. Subsequently, prisoners from all over Europe (Germany, Austria, Spain, Poland, Greece, Romania, Italy, Yugoslavia, Russia, etc.) arrived weekly, including the first group of Hungarian Jews transferred from Auschwitz concentration camp on May 28, 1944.

On September 20, 1944, 1,080 French, Russian, and Polish deportees, evacuated from Natzweiler-Struthof concentration camp (located in annexed Alsace) to Dachau concentration camp, arrived in Melk. The last convoy—part of a transport that left Auschwitz during its evacuation on January 27, 1945—included Jews deemed "able to work" accompanied by their guards, as well as about 100 children under the age of 15 who had survived the Polish camps.

The camp held an average of 10,000 prisoners representing 25 different nationalities. Of the 14,400 men deported to Melk, 4,801 perished there, including 663 Frenchmen.

== Forced labour ==
The all-male prisoners were forced to dig immense tunnels in the mountains near Roggendorf for the production of armaments by Steyr Daimler Puch AG. The prisoners were also employed in constructing barracks in the surrounding area and at the "Luftwaffe camp" in Loosdorf. Other victims worked at a large sawmill in Amstetten, which supplied timber for the underground installations.

Digging the tunnels and pouring the concrete for the vaults were among the most perilous and arduous tasks. However, daily life in the overcrowded former barracks was equally unbearable for all the prisoners. The Danube Valley endured violent winds, rain, and snow throughout the winter, while the very brief summer was oppressively hot. Malnutrition, inherent to the camp's operation, was further aggravated by the embezzlement carried out by the SS. In addition to the two daily roll calls, there were countless other gatherings, long and unpredictable, at all hours of the day and night. Violence was constant: beatings with gummi and executions punished the slightest offense, real or imagined. The systematic elimination of the weakest was an inviolable rule.

At dawn, in the cold or snow, the sheer size of a column of several hundred men, lined up in rows of five and methodically counted by the officers, was already striking. But in the evening, at nightfall, or even worse, at ten o'clock when the afternoon shift returned, the scene became truly terrifying. The most vulnerable, the sick, or those under protection instinctively dreaded the day they would have to join these ranks. Wooden clogs pounded the ground in an irregular rhythm, without any military discipline. Bodies were stiff, movements jerky, and striped uniforms gave the mass of humanity the appearance of a compact, moving block. Faces, when visible, bore the marks of exhaustion: hollow features, prominent cheekbones, vacant stares. The electric lighting reinforced the almost unreal character of this endless procession. The prisoners marched by the hundreds. The last rows concentrated bodies broken by eight hours of grueling labor and two hours of travel. In each row of five, two men often had to be supported, or even carried, by the other three. Some were dragged along the ground, without any possibility of slowing the pace. In the most serious cases, frequent in December, the last row was no longer composed of five men marching together, but of four porters carrying a fifth prisoner on a plank, exhausted, unconscious, wounded, dying, or already dead. The essential thing was that the count be maintained: always "in rows of five".

== Buildings ==
=== Infirmary ===
The infirmary, known as the "revier", contributed to making survival increasingly uncertain. Designed for 300 patients and lacking medical resources, it housed up to 1,700, crammed into two barracks, with little prospect of recovery, under the supervision of Gottlieb Muzikant. The most seriously ill or wounded prisoners were transferred to Mauthausen, where, until November 1944, the bodies of the dead were also sent. Gottlieb Musikant, who reviewed the sick every morning, like a true SS officer... The kapo, Zenon Michalak, distributed some medication to treat Block XIV. Doctors Guy Lemordan, Then Sprunk, and Hirsch, the surgeon Wassilis Rakopoulos, the laborers Lucien Roth, Louis Jolivet, and Jean Polak, the "toaster?" Raymond Hallery, the pharmacist Jacques Gander, and the dentist René Perrier, among others, tried to save those and what could be saved. In 1945, they were helped by Josef Sora, a Luftwaffe medical officer and Muzikant's deputy.

=== Crematorium ===
In November 1944, a crematorium built by prisoners near the Revier was put into operation. Between 6 November 1944 and 15 April 1945, 4,048 men were cremated there.

== Events ==
=== Bombing of 8 July 1944 ===
At 11:00 a.m. on July 8, 1944, Anglo-American aircraft bombed the camp, having mistakenly identified it as a German barracks. Between two hundred and one thousand prisoners were killed, mostly Hungarian Jews belonging to the night shift, trapped by the fire in the only barrack that remained locked. The raid also injured two hundred prisoners, as well as several civilians in Melk. However, the area surrounding the Roggendorf underground construction site, though clearly visible, was spared.

=== Evacuation ===
The liquidation of the Melk subcamp began in early April 1945. Following the evacuation, on April 1st and 2nd, of the subcamps located in eastern Lower Austria and Vienna, Melk became the easternmost camp of the Mauthausen concentration camp complex. Construction work there was halted at that time. Approximately 500 prisoners were then transferred to the Amstetten subcamp, which was still nearly completed. The complete evacuation of the camp took place in five convoys between April 11th and 15th. The first convoy left Melk on April 11, 1945, by train bound for the main Mauthausen camp, under the command of Hauptsturmführer Klein. It transported 1,500 prisoners, including sick individuals from the infirmary and children and teenagers who had arrived from Auschwitz at the end of January. Fifteen prisoners died during this transport.

During the second convoy, 2,402 prisoners were loaded onto barges at the port of Melk and then transported to Linz via the Danube River. They were then forced to march to Ebensee concentration camp, which they reached on April 20. Twenty-one prisoners died on the way, and sixteen escaped. On the same day, a third convoy of 2,000 prisoners departed by train and arrived in Ebensee the following day, with no deaths or escapes reported. Two days later, a fourth convoy of 1,444 prisoners left Melk by train and reached Ebensee on April 17; twenty-five prisoners escaped, with no deaths recorded. The fifth and final convoy consisted of 55 prisoners, transported by truck or horse-drawn carriage, all of whom arrived at their destination.

Originally, the plan was to push all the prisoners into the "Quarz" tunnel system and then blow it up. Although the blasting chambers had been prepared for this, the plan was not carried out. According to Jean Varnoux, it is likely that the Luftwaffe doctor Josef Sora convinced the camp administration to abandon this project. All prisoners unfit for transport were "sprayed" in the "concentration camp infirmary" by an SS medical unit—that is, murdered by injecting poison into the heart. It is assumed that most of the prisoners brought to Mauthausen died in the gas chambers in the area. Some prisoners from Ebensee, however, lived long enough to be liberated by American troops on May 6, 1945. The Melk concentration camp itself was reached by the Red Army two days later, on May 8, 1945, completely deserted.

== Memorial ==
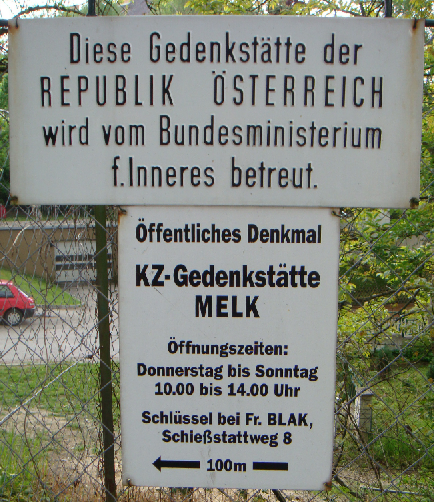
Entrance sign for the concentration camp memorial

As early as 1946, the former crematorium in Melk was converted into a place of remembrance for survivors and the families of the camp's victims. Separated from the site of the former camp in 1950, it was designated a public monument in 1962 and officially opened in March 1963.

Placed under the administration of the Mauthausen Memorial, this structure aims to preserve the memory of the Melk camp, to honor the victims and to recall the responsibility of the perpetrators and witnesses, while nourishing historical reflection for the present and the future. The memorial is open for free individual visits in the former crematorium, located Schießstattweg 2 in Melk.

The stone guard barracks, newly built in 1944, were demolished, and apartment buildings were erected in their place. Furthermore, at the "Kupferschmiedkreuz" on the other side of the highway, the concentration camp's water tank—built by prisoners and still standing today—commemorates the history of this extermination site.

The Appellplatz has retained its original appearance, but the camp barracks have completely disappeared. Only a few traces of the Roggendorf construction site remain—notably a mound of sand recalling the excavation work carried out by the prisoners. The six main tunnels and the hundreds of meters of galleries dug into the sandy hills of the Wachberg are difficult to access today, as their entrances have been sealed off.

Since May 8, 1992, the "Melk Public Monument" has housed a permanent exhibition on the Melk concentration camp, an initiative spearheaded by Bertrand Perz. A new exhibition has been installed in the memorial—located in the former crematorium—using photographs, documents, and artifacts to provide information on the economic context that led to the camp's construction, as well as on the lives, suffering, and deaths of the prisoners.

On September 6, 2008, the "Viertelfestival Niederösterreich" (Lower Austrian Regional Festival) initiative installed a telephone booth in Melk’s main square; there, the names of surviving former prisoners could be spoken via a "telephone directory," and interviews with contemporary witnesses could be heard. Additionally, initial information about the Melk concentration camp could be obtained inside the booth. The structure was relocated to a spot near the memorial entrance on November 8, 2008.

The memorial is visited by groups and initiatives that learn about the events on site and organise commemorative ceremonies and lectures. One example was an evening of reflection held by the Catholic Action of the Diocese of Sankt Pölten and organised by the Coordinating Committee for Christian–Jewish Cooperation on June 7, 2008, with a service and a discussion.

The Birago Barracks are now used by the Austrian Armed Forces. Named after military engineer Karl von Birago, the barracks house the Austrian Armed Forces' 3rd Pioneer Battalion.

== See also ==
- List of Nazi concentration camps
- Mühlviertler Hasenjagd (mass escape from Mauthausen, February 1945)
- Nazi concentration camp badge
- Dachau trials
- The Photographer of Mauthausen, 2018 film by Mar Targarona
