= Mühlviertler Hasenjagd =

Nazi war crime

Coordinates: 48°25′N 14°25′E

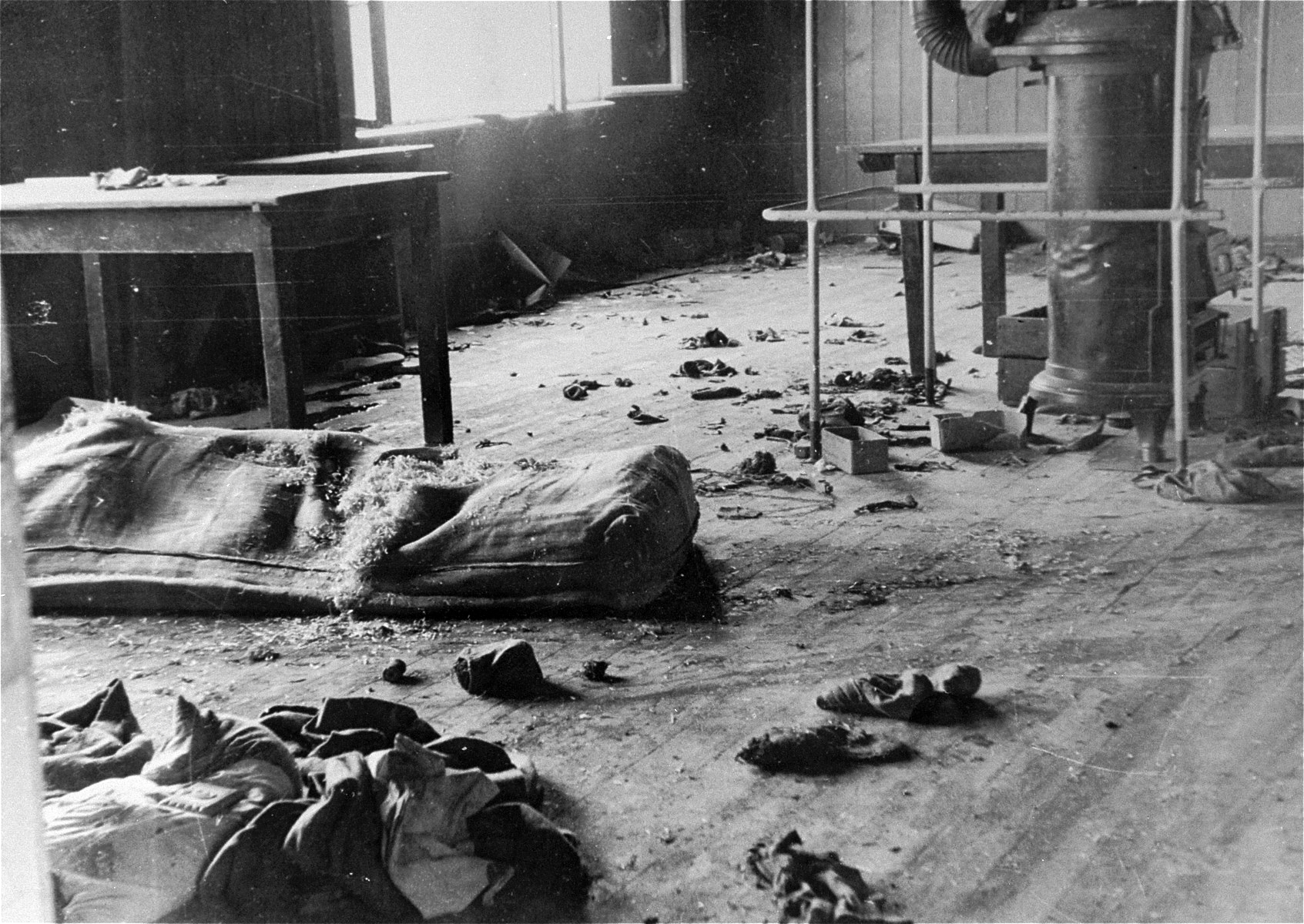
- Block 20 after the escape

- Mühlviertel
- Also known as: Mühlviertel rabbit chase
- Location: Mühlviertel, Upper Austria
- Date: February 1945
- Incident type: Massacre
- Perpetrators: SS-Totenkopfverbände, Sturmabteilung (SA), Volkssturm, Landswacht, gendarmerie, Hitler Youth, Austrian civilians
- Camp: Mühlviertel subcamp of Mauthausen-Gusen
- Victims: More than 489 Soviet officer POWs
- Survivors: 11
- Memorials: Ried in der Riedmark

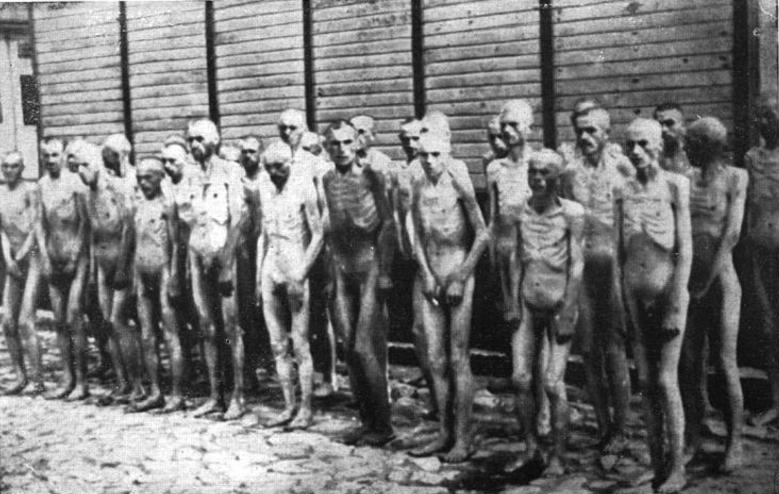
Soviet prisoners of war at Mauthausen. The 500 escapees from Mühlviertler were in similar condition.

The Mühlviertler Hasenjagd (lit. 'Mühlviertel rabbit hunt') was a war crime in which 500 Soviet officers, who had revolted and escaped from the Mühlviertel subcamp of Mauthausen-Gusen concentration camp on 2 February 1945, were hunted down. Local civilians, soldiers and local Nazi organizations hunted down the escapees for three weeks, summarily executing most of them. Of the original 500 prisoners who took part in the escape attempt, eleven succeeded in remaining free until the end of the war. It was the largest escape in the history of the Nazi concentration camps.

== Background ==
On 2 March 1944, Field Marshal Wilhelm Keitel issued a decree (Aktion Kugel—"Operation Bullet") stating that escaped Soviet officers were to be taken to Mauthausen concentration camp and shot. Pursuant to this order 5,700 Soviet officers were apprehended and deported to Mauthausen. Some were shot immediately, and others imprisoned in Block 20, which was separated from the rest of the camp by a fence 2.5 meters high, on top of which was barbed wire. Along the perimeter there were three towers with machine guns. Prisoners of this block were not registered in the camp records and received a quarter of the food of other prisoners. In the winter, before the prisoners were driven inside, the SS hosed the floor with water and forced prisoners to lie down and allow the SS men to walk on them to avoid getting their boots dirty. Soviet POWs imprisoned in the barracks were forced to spend all day doing "exercise" – non-stop running around the block or crawling. Prisoners referred to it as the "death barracks" (German: Todesblock).

The maximum population at any one time was around 1,800, but 10 to 20 people died each day. By the end of January, about 570 prisoners remained alive.

== Escape ==
In the night hours of February 2, 1945, some 500 prisoners from Block 20 made a mass escape. Using fire extinguishers from the barracks and blankets and boards as projectiles, one group attacked and occupied a watch tower while a second group used wet blankets and bits of clothing to cause a short circuit in the electrified fence. The prisoners then climbed over the fence.

Of those 500, 419 prisoners did manage to leave the camp grounds but many escapees were already too weakened from starvation to reach the woods and collapsed in the snow outside the camp, where they were shot that night by SS machine guns. All who failed to reach the woods, and another 75 prisoners in the barracks who had remained behind because they were too sick to follow, were executed that night. Over 300 prisoners reached the woods on the first night.

== Pursuit ==
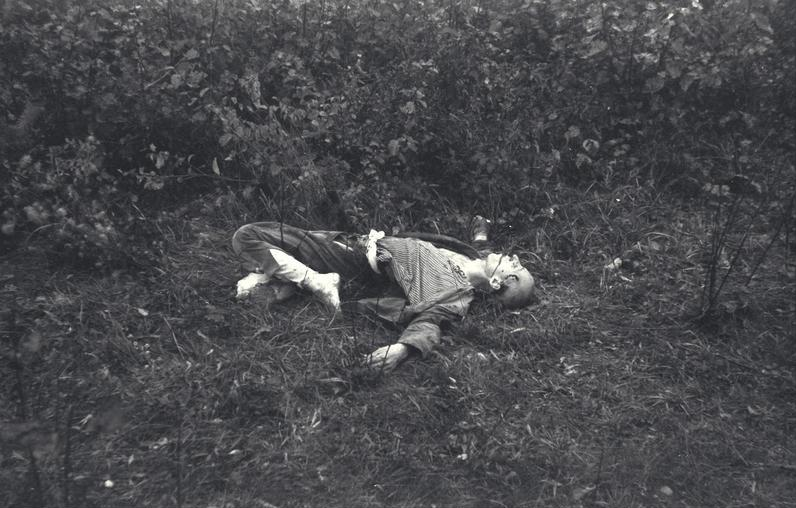
Prisoner shot dead at Mauthausen

The SS camp commandant immediately called a major search, asking for help from the local population. In addition to pursuit by the SS, the escapees were hunted down by SA detachments, the Gendarmerie, the Wehrmacht, the Volkssturm and the Hitler Youth. Local citizens were also incited to take part. The SS camp commandant ordered the Gendarmerie "not to bring anyone back alive". No one was forced to participate in the manhunt as they did so willingly.

The majority of the escapees were apprehended and most were shot or beaten to death on the spot. Some 40 murdered prisoners' bodies were taken to Ried in der Riedmark, where the search was based, and stacked in a pile of corpses, "just like the bag at an autumn hunt", as one former gendarme, Otto Gabriel, put it. Members of the Volkssturm who brought prisoners back to Mauthausen were berated for not having beaten them to death instead. Of the 300 who did survive the escape that first night, 57 were returned to the camp.

The Linz criminal investigations department later reported to the Reichssicherheitshauptamt, "Of the 419 fugitives [who managed to leave the camp] [...], in and around Mauthausen, Gallneukirchen, Wartberg, Pregarten, Schwertberg and Perg, over 300 were taken again, including 57 alive." According to a witness, Gauleiter August Eigruber, whose orders the SS, SA, and Volkssturm were following, told commandant Franz Ziereis that "All these pigs will have to be finished," in reference to the recaptured prisoners.

Just 11 officers are known to have survived the manhunt till the end of World War II. In spite of the extremely high risk, a few farm families and civilian forced laborers hid escapees or brought food to those hiding in the woods. After three months, the war ended and the fugitives were safe.

== Legacy ==
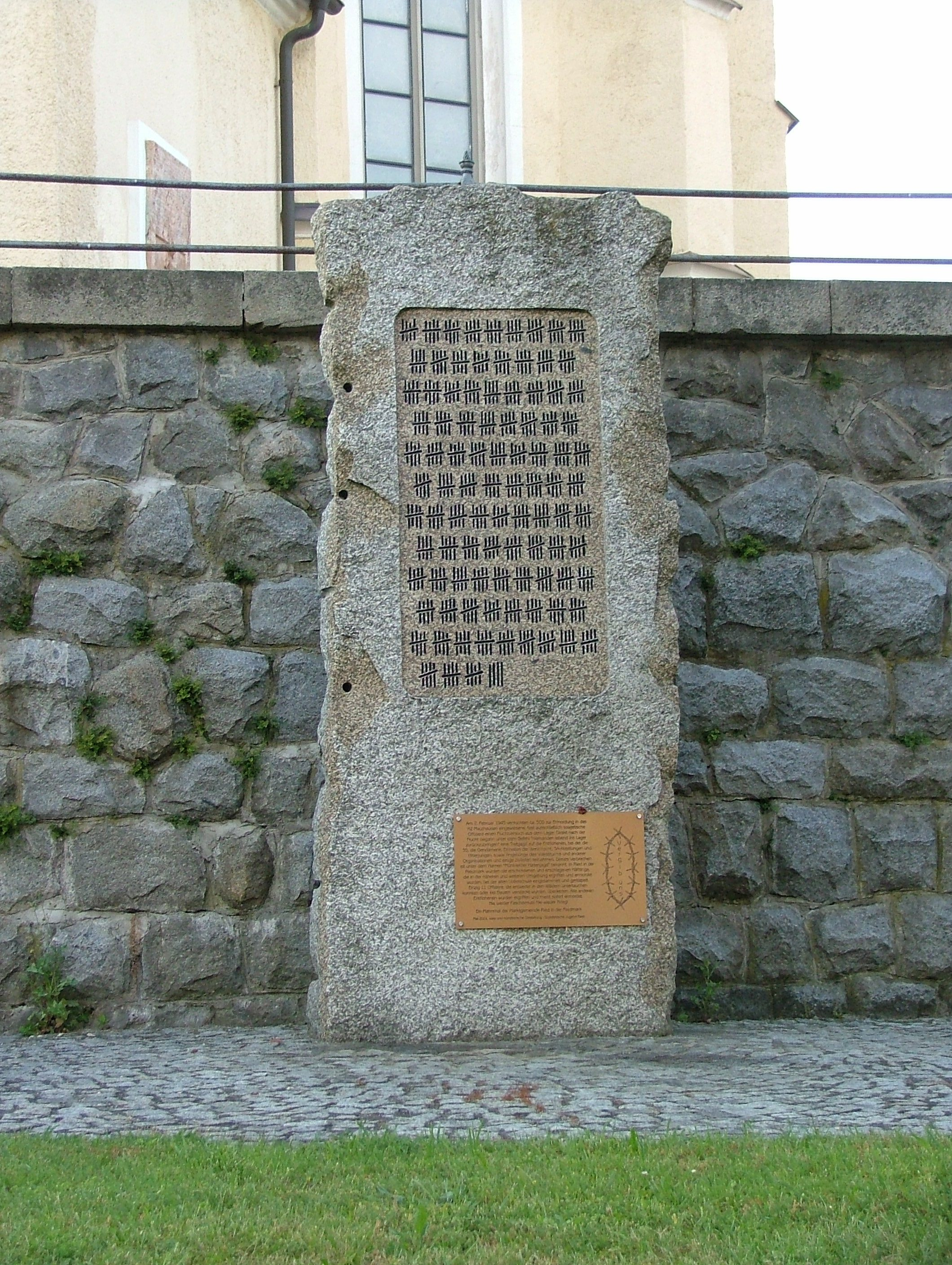
Memorial for the "Hasenjagd" in Ried in der Riedmark

August Eigruber, who, along with some of his codefendants, was implicated in the crime and numerous other atrocities, and tried by an American military court at the Mauthausen-Gusen camp trials. Eigruber was sentenced to death by hanging, and executed at Landsberg Prison on May 28, 1947.

Hugo Tacha, a Wehrmacht soldier at home on leave at the time of the breakout, was convicted for his role in the crime and sentenced to 20 years in jail by an Austrian court.

A memorial to the Mühlviertler Hasenjagd was unveiled in Ried an der Riedmark on May 5, 2001, 56 years after the liberation of Mauthausen-Gusen concentration camp. The monument was erected at the initiative of the Ried Socialist Youth. The three-metre-tall (9.8 ft) granite boulder was donated by the Mauthausen Committee. The monument's face is engraved with 489 hash marks representing those murdered during the course of the escape attempt; the exact number of victims is unknown. In conjunction with the commemoration of the anniversary of the camp's liberation, the Socialist Youth Austria (SJÖ) and Socialist Youth of Germany (SJD – The Falcons) held a program at the new monument for the Mühlviertler Hasenjagd. Attending were three surviving former Soviet prisoners from Mauthausen, Prof. Tigran Drambyan, Roman Bulkatch and Nikolai Markevitch.

The events of the Mühlviertel massacre gained prominence with the 1994 film The Quality of Mercy by director Andreas Gruber, and was a box office success in Austria. The film received a lukewarm review from Variety. While he was making the film, Gruber invited Bernard Bamberger to make a behind-the-scenes documentary about the film and compare the movie with the actual events. Aktion K juxtaposes interviews with local residents about the film and the actual history with archival footage and the eyewitness testimony of Mikhail Ribchinsky, a survivor of the Mühlviertler Hasenjagd. Bamberger was awarded the "Austrian People's Education TV" award for "Best Documentary" in 1995.

== See also ==
- Celle massacre

== Sources ==
- DeMeritt, Linda C. (1999). "Representations of History: The "Mühlviertler Hasenjagd" as Word and Image". Modern Austrian Literature. 32 (4): 135–145. ISSN 0026-7503. JSTOR 24648890.
- Horwitz, Gordon J (1991). In the shadow of death: living outside the gates of Mauthausen. London and New York: Tauris. ISBN 978-1-85043-339-2.
- Kaltenbrunner, Matthias (2011). K-Häftlinge im KZ-Mauthausen und die 'Mühlviertler Hasenjagd' (Hochschulschrift thesis) (in German). University of Vienna. doi:10.25365/thesis.15077.
- Matt, Alphons (1988). Einer aus dem Dunkel: die Befreiung des Konzentrationslagers Mauthausen durch den Bankbeamten H. (in German). Zürich: SV international/Schweizer Verlagshaus. ISBN 978-3-7263-6574-5.
- Wachsmann, Nikolaus (2015). KL: A History of the Nazi Concentration Camps. Macmillan. ISBN 978-0-374-11825-9.
