= Adolf Zutter =

German SS officer at Mauthausen concentration camp

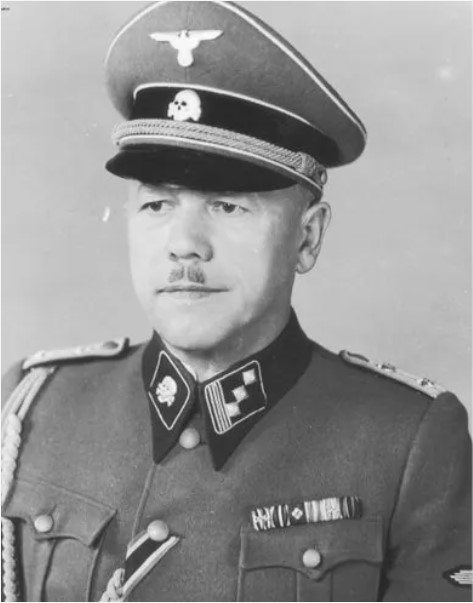
- Born: February 10, 1889; Zweibrücken, German Empire
- Died: May 27, 1947 (aged 58); Landsberg Prison, Allied-occupied Germany
- Status: Executed by hanging
- Conviction: War crimes
- Trial: Mauthausen Trial
- Penalty: Death
- SS career
- Allegiance: Nazi Germany
- Branch: Schutzstaffel
- Rank: Hauptsturmführer

Adolf Zutter (10 February 1889 – 27 May 1947) was a German SS-Hauptsturmführer at Mauthausen concentration camp, who was tried and executed for war crimes. Zutter, a member of the NSDAP (membership number 3,543,330) and the SS (membership number 226,911), was from 27 September 1939 to the beginning of May 1945 a member of the camp staff of KZ Mauthausen. From 27 September 1939 to the spring of 1942 he worked as Kommandoführer in Wien Graben and then as commander of the guards until June 1942. From June 1942 to early May 1945, he was adjutant under the Nazi concentration camp commandant Franz Ziereis in Mauthausen concentration camp.

After the war, Zutter was accused by a military court in the Mauthausen-Gusen camp trials under the Dachau trials and condemned on 13 May 1946 to death by hanging. The judgment believed, that the ordering and implementing of executions and participation in the gas chamber (mass murder) were considered as individual excess deeds of Zutter. The sentence was enforced on 27 May 1947 in the Landsberg prison for war criminals.
