= Aribert Heim =

Austrian SS doctor (1914–1992)

- Born: Aribert Ferdinand Heim; 28 June 1914; Bad Radkersburg, Austria-Hungary
- Died: 10 August 1992 (aged 78); Cairo, Egypt
- Spouse: Friedl Heim
- Children: 3
- Military career
- Allegiance: Nazi Germany
- Branch: Schutzstaffel
- Service years: 1940–1945
- Rank: SS-Hauptsturmführer (Captain)
- Nicknames: Dr. Death; Butcher of Mauthausen; Tarek Farid Hussein
- Units: Mauthausen-Gusen concentration camp 6th SS Mountain Division Nord

Aribert Ferdinand Heim (28 June 1914 – 10 August 1992), also known as Dr. Death and Butcher of Mauthausen, was an Austrian Schutzstaffel (SS) doctor. During World War II, he served at the Mauthausen-Gusen concentration camp in Mauthausen, killing and torturing inmates using various methods, such as the direct injection of toxic compounds into the hearts of his victims and removing the organs of victims without anesthesia. He also was responsible for a high but unknown number of deaths due to the experimentation.

After the war, Heim lived in Cairo, Egypt, under the alias of Tarek Farid Hussein after his conversion to Islam. In February 2009, after years of attempts to locate him, German television network ZDF had found Heim's passport and other documents in Cairo. It was then reported that Heim had died there on 10 August 1992 from complications of rectal cancer, according to testimony by his son Rüdiger and lawyer. This information, though set forth by a German court, was questioned by Efraim Zuroff, a leading Nazi hunter of the Simon Wiesenthal Center. Zuroff stated that on a visit to Puerto Montt, Chile, in July 2008, Heim's daughter told him that Heim had died in 1993 in Argentina. In 2012, a court in Baden-Baden confirmed again that Heim had died in 1992 in Egypt, based on new evidence provided by his family and lawyer. The Wiesenthal Center continued to dispute these findings, and Heim remained on the list of most-wanted Nazi war criminals until 2013.

== Early life ==
Heim was born on 28 June 1914, in Bad Radkersburg, Austria-Hungary, the son of a policeman and a housewife. He studied in Graz, and received his diploma in medicine from the University of Vienna in 1940, two years after Austria was annexed by Germany. Later the same year he volunteered to join Hitler's elite Waffen SS. In October 1941, Heim was assigned to Mauthausen near Linz, Austria as a camp doctor. While at the concentration camp, Heim worked closely with SS pharmacist Erich Wasicky and carried out gruesome experiments likened to those of Josef Mengele at Auschwitz. Heim was also a doctor at Buchenwald and Sachsenhausen concentration camps.

== Mauthausen concentration camp ==
Aribert Heim worked in Mauthausen for six weeks as a doctor starting in October 1941 at the age of 27. Prisoners at Mauthausen called Heim "Dr. Death", or the "Butcher of Mauthausen" for his cruelty.

According to witnesses, Heim worked closely with SS pharmacist Erich Wasicky. The two performed gruesome experiments together, such as injecting various solutions into the hearts of Jewish prisoners to see which killed them the fastest.

Heim was known for performing operations without anesthesia. For about two months (October to December 1941), Heim was stationed at the Ebensee concentration camp near Linz, Austria, where he carried out experiments on Jews and others similar to those performed at Auschwitz by Josef Mengele. According to Holocaust survivors, Jewish prisoners were poisoned with various injections directly into the heart, including petrol, phenol, available poisons, or even water, to induce death.

Heim reportedly removed organs from living prisoners without anesthesia, killing hundreds. A prisoner by the name of Karl Lotter also worked in the Mauthausen hospital at the time Aribert Heim was there. Lotter testified that in 1941, he witnessed Aribert Heim butcher a prisoner who came to him with an inflamed foot. Lotter provided more gruesome details about how Aribert butchered the 18-year-old prisoner, stating that Aribert gave him anesthetic and then proceeded to cut him open, castrate him, and take out one of his kidneys. The prisoner died, and his head was cut off, boiled and stripped of its flesh.

Heim then allegedly used this young man's skull as a paperweight on his desk. In a sworn statement that was given eight years after the incident Lotter stated that Heim "needed the head because of its perfect teeth". Other survivors of the Holocaust referred to Aribert removing tattooed flesh from prisoners and using the skin to make seat coverings, which he gave to the commandant of the camp. Marcelino Bilbao Bilbao stated that Heim drew blood from him for six weeks and later injected him with a liquid that ended up paralyzing his body.

== Military career ==
From February 1942, Heim served in the 6th SS Mountain Division Nord in northern Finland, especially in Oulu's hospitals as an SS doctor. His service continued until at least October 1942.

On 15 March 1945, Heim was captured by US soldiers and sent to a camp for prisoners of war. He would remain imprisoned for a two-and-a-half year period. But while Heim's former colleague, Erich Wasicky, and dozens of others were tried and executed in the Mauthausen-Gusen camp trials, Heim was never prosecuted (his files having been altered by someone to remove all reference to Mauthausen, instead stating he had been on a different SS assignment). In December 1947, he was released and worked as a gynecologist at Baden-Baden until his disappearance in 1962; he had telephoned his home and was told that the police were waiting for him. Having been questioned on previous occasions, he surmised the reason (an international warrant for his arrest had been in place since that date) and went into hiding. According to his son, Rüdiger Heim, he drove through France and Spain onward to Morocco, moving finally to Egypt via Libya. Heim continued to collect and live off the rents owed to him from an apartment block that he owned until 1979, when German authorities confiscated the property.

== Investigations and possible sightings ==
In the years following his disappearance, Heim was the target of a rapidly escalating manhunt and ever-increasing rewards for his capture. Following his escape there were reported sightings in Latin America, Spain and Africa, as well as formal investigations aimed at bringing him to justice, some of which took place even after he had apparently died in Egypt. The German government offered €150,000 for information leading to his arrest, while the Simon Wiesenthal Center launched Operation Last Chance, a project to assist governments in the location and arrest of suspected Nazi war criminals who were still alive. Tax records prove that, as late as 2001, Heim's lawyer asked the German authorities to refund capital gains taxes levied on him because he was living abroad.

Heim reportedly hid out in South America, Spain and the Balkans, but only his presence in Spain has ever been confirmed. Efraim Zuroff, of the Wiesenthal Center, initiated an active search for his whereabouts, and in late 2005, Spanish police incorrectly determined he was in Palafrugell, Spain. According to El Mundo, Heim had been helped by associates of Otto Skorzeny, who had organised one of the biggest ODESSA bases in Franco's Spain.

Press reports in mid-October 2005 suggested that Heim's arrest by Spanish police was "imminent". Within a few days, however, newer reports suggested that he had evaded capture and had moved either to another part of Spain or to Denmark.

Fredrik Jensen, a Norwegian and a former SS Obersturmführer, was put under police investigation in June 2007, and charged with assisting Heim in his escape. The accusation was denied by Jensen. In July 2007, the Austrian Ministry of Justice declared that it would pay €50,000 for information leading to his arrest and extradition to Austria.

On 6 July 2008, Efraim Zuroff, the Wiesenthal Center's chief Nazi-hunter, went to South America as part of a public campaign to capture the most wanted Nazi in the world and bring him to justice, claiming that Heim was alive and hiding in Patagonia, either in Chile or in Argentina. He elaborated on 15 July 2008 that he was sure Heim was alive and the groundwork had been laid to capture him within weeks.

In 2008, Heim was named as one of the ten most wanted Nazi war criminals by the Simon Wiesenthal Center.

== Later years and death ==
Heim and his former wife, Friedl, had two sons. He also had a daughter, Waltraud, born out of wedlock living in Chile.

In 2006, a German newspaper reported that his daughter, Waltraud, living on the outskirts of Puerto Montt, Chile, said he had died in 1993. However, when she tried to recover a multimillion-euro inheritance from an account in his name, she was unable to provide a death certificate.

In August 2008, Heim's son Rüdiger asked that his father be declared legally dead, in order to take hold of his assets. He claimed he intended to make a donation to humanitarian projects working to document the atrocities committed in the camps.

After years of apparently false sightings, the circumstances surrounding Heim's escape, life in hiding and death were jointly reported by the German broadcaster ZDF and The New York Times in February 2009. It was reported that Heim died on 10 August 1992, in Cairo, Egypt with his cause of death being colorectal cancer. In the later years of his life, Heim had named himself Tarek Farid Hussein. People in Egypt who knew Heim said they did not know he was a wanted man.

In an interview at the family's villa in Baden-Baden, his son Rüdiger admitted publicly for the first time that he was with his father in Egypt at the time of Heim's death, saying that it was during the Olympics, and that he died the day after the games ended. According to Efraim Zuroff, Rüdiger Heim had constantly denied having any knowledge of the whereabouts of his father until the publishing of the ZDF research results.

On 18 March 2009, the Simon Wiesenthal Center filed a criminal complaint due to suspicion of false testimony. In 2012, a regional court in Baden-Baden confirmed that Heim died under the assumed identity of Tarek Hussein Farid in Egypt in 1992, based on papers from his lawyer and testimony from his son.

In its 2013 annual Nazi war criminal report, the Simon Wiesenthal Center disputed the 2012 ruling by the Baden-Baden court, claiming a lack of forensic confirmation of Heim's death. Rüdiger Heim recounted how Egyptian authorities had forced him to have his father interred in an unmarked common grave in Cairo, rendering it impossible for investigators to find Heim's remains for DNA testing. Heim was not included in the 2014 report.

== In popular culture ==
Israeli author Danny Baz published The Secret Executioners in 2007, in which he claimed that a clandestine organisation called 'The Owl', operating outside of international law, tracked Heim down and assassinated him in the U.S. on an island off the California coast in 1982. Baz claimed he was a member of 'The Owl' himself and claimed that his group carried out several assassinations of Nazis who had sought refuge in the US. The Simon Wiesenthal Centre has expressed doubts regarding Baz's claims.

In her novel The Scent of Lemon Leaves (Lo que esconde tu nombre, 2010) Clara Sánchez gives a fictional account of Heim's refuge in Spain. In the afterword to the novel the author states that she used a real name for a fictional character.

In the fictional Netflix series Jaguar (Global release 22 September 2021) a group of Nazi hunters attempt to catch Heim in Spain in 1962.
