= Ziereis =

Ziereis is a German surname. Notable people with the surname include:

- Franz Ziereis (1905–1945), German Nazi SS concentration camp commandant
- Markus Ziereis (born 1992), German footballer
- Philipp Ziereis (born 1993), German footballer
