= Maršálek =

Maršálek (Czech pronunciation: [ˈmarʃaːlɛk]) is Czech for "marshal". It may refer to:

== People ==
- Hans Maršálek (1914–2011), Austrian political activist and concentration camp survivor
- Jan Marsalek (born 1980), Austrian fugitive businessman and suspected spy

== Works ==
- Imperial and Royal Field Marshal (Czech: C. a k. polní maršálek), 1930 Czechoslovak film
