= Eduard Krebsbach =

German physician and SS doctor in the Nazi concentration camp in Mauthausen

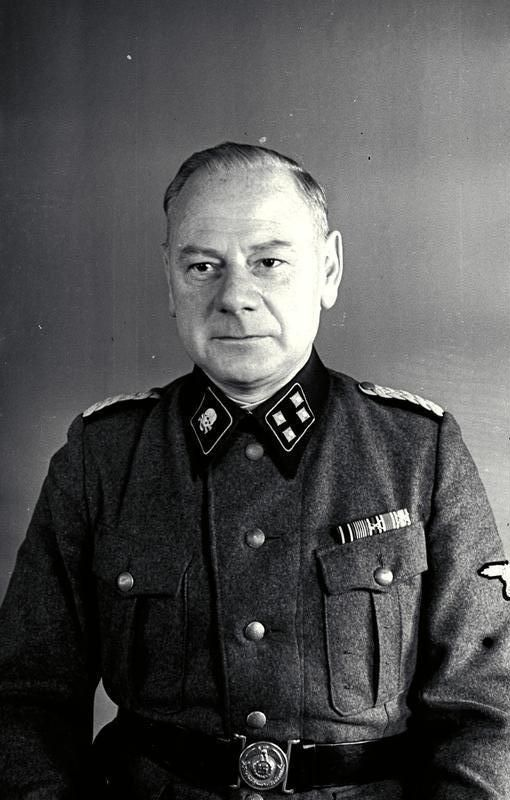
- Born: 8 August 1894; Bonn, German Empire
- Died: 28 May 1947 (aged 52); Landsberg Prison, Allied-occupied Germany
- Other names: "Dr. Spritzbach" ("Dr. Injection")
- Occupation: Medical doctor
- Political party: Nazi Party
- Status: Executed by hanging
- Motive: Nazism
- Conviction: War crimes
- Trial: Mauthausen Trial
- Penalty: Death

Details
- Victims: Thousands
- Span of crimes: 1941–1944
- Country: Austria and Latvia
- Locations: Mauthausen concentration camp and Kaiserwald concentration camp
- 'SS career'
- Allegiance: Nazi Germany
- Branch: Waffen-SS
- Service years: 1939–1945
- Rank: Obersturmbannführer

Eduard Krebsbach (8 August 1894 – 28 May 1947) was a German physician and SS doctor in the Nazi concentration camp in Mauthausen from July 1941 to August 1943. He was executed for atrocities committed at the Mauthausen camp.

== Early life ==
Krebsbach attended a humanistic high school in Cologne. In 1912, he started studying medicine at the University of Freiburg, albeit his classes were interrupted by four years of military service in World War I. He served in the Imperial German Army and earned the Iron Cross, 2nd class. Returning to school in Freiburg, he became a member of the Catholic student fraternity KDStV Ripuaria Freiburg in the Cartellverband. In 1919, he published his dissertation, earned his doctorate and was one of the co-founders of the Freiburg branch of the Deutschvölkischer Schutz- und Trutzbund. In mid-1920, he left Freiburg to work as a company and district physician.

== Nazi and SS career ==
After the Nazi seizure of power in 1933, Krebsbach was dismissed from his position as district physician as an alleged opponent of the Nazis. In the autumn of 1933, he opened a medical practice in Freiburg and, at the same time, worked as a contract physician for the Freiburg police department. In June 1933, he joined the SS (SS number 106,821) and the Nazi Party. There were problems with Krebsbach's party membership, but he reapplied and was admitted effective 1 May 1937 (membership number 4,142,556). In the SS, Krebsbach was the commander of the medical corps of the 65th SS-Standarte in Freiburg. In November 1938, he was promoted to SS-Untersturmführer and was among the small group of SA and SS men who ransacked and set fire to the Freiburg synagogue during the Kristallnacht pogrom.

=== Concentration camp actions ===
In the autumn of 1941, Krebsbach became Standortarzt (garrison doctor) of Mauthausen concentration camp, tasked with supervising medical care and all medical personnel of the camp. He was responsible for initiating mass killing by lethal injection to the heart of handicapped and sick prisoners. Under his supervision, approximately 900 Russian, Polish and Czech prisoners were murdered by lethal injections of gasoline and phenol. Because of this, inmates nicknamed him 'Dr. Spritzbach' (Dr. Injection). Krebsbach was also responsible for the construction of a gas chamber in the basement of the hospital in the Mauthausen camp.

Krebsbach often inspected the prisoners and conducted selections for execution. A former inmate recalled Krebsbach's actions during such an inspection:

As the senior SS doctor in the camp, Dr Krebsbach sometimes came to block 5 and had the still surviving Jews paraded before him. He then asked if any of them were doctors. If there were, he would say: "You Jewish pig, you’re just an abortionist." The next day they were done away with by the kapos. If a Jewish inmate was lying on the floor with a broken limb – a not uncommon occurrence at work – he was usually thrown over a wall by a kapo. If Dr Krebsbach were passing, he would say ironically: "Yes, this broken foot is a hopeless case."

— Josef Herzler, former Mauthausen inmate (AMM V/3/22)

Krebsbach was transferred to the Kaiserwald concentration camp in Latvia during the autumn of 1943. The reason for his transfer is believed to be an incident in which he shot and killed Josef Breitenfellner, a vacationing German soldier, who awoke Krebsbach from his sleep on 22 May 1943. While at Kaiserwald, Krebsbach conducted selections of camp inmates for execution, by forcing the prisoners to perform physical exercises to determine their strength and then identifying the 2,000 weakest to be killed.

Following the camp's closure, Krebsbach resumed a career as “Epidemic Inspector for Latvia, Estonia and Lithuania”. Soon after, he transferred to the regular army as a senior staff doctor, serving until late 1944. However, this was short lived and at the end of 1944 he left the army and worked once again as a company doctor in a spinning mill in Kassel.

== Post-war trial for war crimes ==
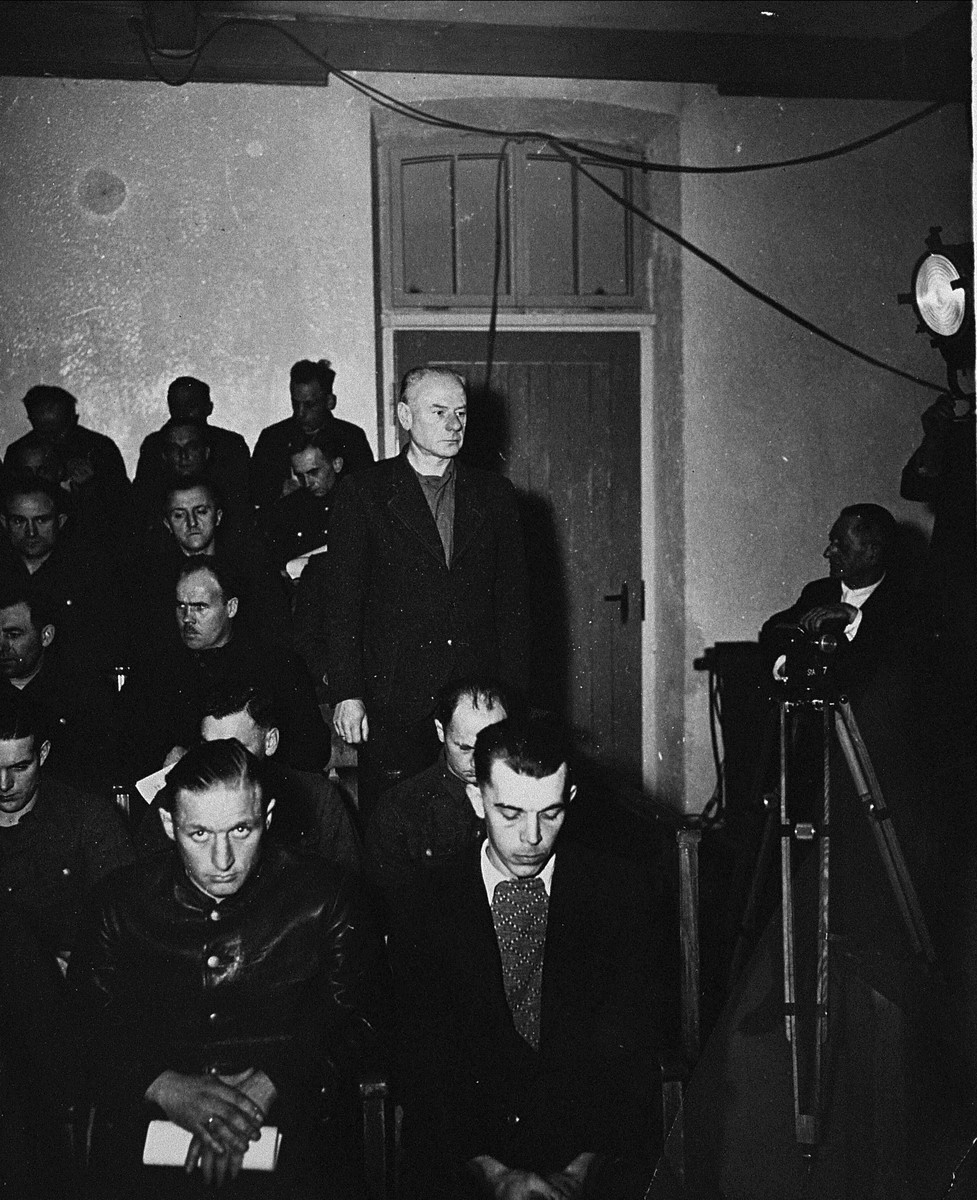
Krebsbach stands during his trial

Following the end of World War II, he was arrested, convicted of war crimes, and sentenced to death during the Mauthausen trial conducted by the US military on 13 May 1946 and was executed by hanging on 28 May 1947 at Landsberg Prison in Landsberg am Lech.

The following is from the court record of the Dachau trials (quoted in Hans Maršálek, "Die Geschichte des Konzentrationslagers Mauthausen", p. 174):

Krebsbach: When I started work I was ordered by the head of Office III D to kill or have killed all those who were unable to work, and the incurably sick.

Prosecutor: And how did you carry out this order?

Krebsbach: Incurably sick inmates who were absolutely incapable of work were generally gassed. Some were also killed by gasoline injection.

Prosecutor: To your knowledge, how many persons were killed in this way in your presence?

Krebsbach: (no answer)

Prosecutor: You were ordered to kill those unfit to live?

Krebsbach: Yes. I was ordered to have persons killed if I was of the opinion that they were a burden on the state.

Prosecutor: Did it never occur to you that these were human beings, people who had the misfortune to be inmates or who had been neglected?

Krebsbach: No. People are like animals. Animals that are born deformed or incapable of living are put down at birth. This should be done for humanitarian reasons with people as well. This would prevent a lot of misery and unhappiness.

Prosecutor: That is your opinion. The world does not agree with you. Did it never occur to you that killing a human being is a terrible crime?

Krebsbach: No. Every state is entitled to protect itself against asocial persons including those unfit to live.

Prosecutor: In other words, it never occurred to you that what you were doing was a crime?

Krebsbach: No. I carried out my work to the best of my knowledge and belief because I had to.

== Literature ==
- Ernst Klee: Auschwitz, die NS-Medizin und ihre Opfer. 3. Auflage. S. Fischer Verlag, Frankfurt am Main, 1997, ISBN 3-596-14906-1.
- Ernst Klee: Das Personenlexikon zum Dritten Reich: Wer war was vor und nach 1945. Fischer-Taschenbuch-Verlag, Frankfurt am Main 2007, ISBN 978-3-596-16048-8.
- Hans Marsalek: Geschichte des Konzentrationslagers Mauthausen. Österreichische Lagergemeinschaft Mauthausen, Wien, 1980.
- Review and Recommendations of the Deputy Judge Advocate for War Crimes: United States of America vs. Hans Altfuldisch et al. – Case No. 000.50.5 Original document Mauthausen war crimes (pdf), 30. April 1947, in English.
- Florian Freund: Der Dachauer Mauthausenprozess, in: Dokumentationsarchiv des österreichischen Widerstandes. Jahrbuch 2001, Wien 2001, S. 35–66
