= Reichsgau Oberdonau =

Administrative division of Nazi Germany

Reichsgau Upper Danube
- Reichsgau of Nazi Germany
- 1938–1945
- Flag Coat of arms

- Map of Nazi Germany showing its administrative subdivisions (Gaue and Reichsgaue)
- Capital: Linz
- Population
  - 1939: 1,032,115
- Government
- Gauleiter
  - 1938–1945: August Eigruber
- History
  - Anschluss: 12 March 1938
  - German surrender: 8 May 1945
Preceded by
Upper Austria
Styria
Czechoslovakia
Succeeded by
Upper Austria
Czechoslovakia
- Today part of: Austria; Czech Republic

The Reichsgau Upper Danube (German: Reichsgau Oberdonau) was an administrative division of Nazi Germany, created after the Anschluss (annexation of Austria) in 1938 and dissolved in 1945. It consisted of what is today Upper Austria, parts of Southern Bohemia, and a small part of the Salzkammergut which was annexed from Styria.

The Gau had the honorary title of "Home Gau of the Führer" (German: Heimatgau des Führers), since Adolf Hitler was born in Braunau am Inn and spent much of his early life in Linz. His home Berghof was located in neighboring Gau Munich-Upper Bavaria.

== History ==
The Nazi Gau (plural Gaue) system was originally established in a party conference on 22 May 1926, in order to improve administration of the party structure. From 1933 onwards, after the Nazi seizure of power, the Gaue increasingly replaced the German states as administrative subdivisions in Germany. On 12 March 1938 Nazi Germany annexed Austria and on 24 May the Austrian provinces were reorganized and replaced by seven Nazi party Gaue. Under the Ostmarkgesetz law of 14 April 1939 with effect of 1 May, the Austrian Gaue were raised to the status of Reichsgaue and their Gauleiters were subsequently also named Reichsstatthalters.

At the head of each Gau stood a Gauleiter, a position which became increasingly more powerful, especially after the outbreak of the Second World War. Local Gauleiters were in charge of propaganda and surveillance and, from September 1944 onwards, the Volkssturm and the defence of the Gau.

The position of Gauleiter in Upper Danube was held by August Eigruber for the duration of the existence of the Reichsgau.

The Mauthausen-Gusen concentration camp was located in the Reichsgau Oberdonau. Of the 199,404 prisoners that were sent to the camp 119,000 died in the harsh conditions of the camp through overwork, malnourishment and exhaustion. After the war, Eigruber was put on trial by the U.S. military for his role in atrocities at Mauthausen. He was sentenced to death and executed in 1947.

== See also ==
- Ostmark (Austria)
- Reichsgau Lower Danube
