= Karel Sperber =

Czechoslovak surgeon (1910–1957)

Dr Karel Sperber OBE
- Born: 1910; Tachov, Austria-Hungary
- Died: 1957 (aged 46–47); Accra, Gold Coast
- Medical career
- Profession: Physician
- Sub-specialties: Surgery

Karel Sperber OBE (1910–1957) was a Jewish Czechoslovak surgeon who travelled to England after the Nazi invasion of his country, but unable to practice medicine because he was an alien, took a job as a ship's doctor instead and was captured by Axis forces when his ship was sunk by the Germans.

He was sent to Auschwitz concentration camp where he was forced to help the SS doctor Carl Clauberg in his sterilisation experiments on Jewish women. He was appointed an honorary Officer of the Order of the British Empire (OBE) in 1946 for the medical services he provided to prisoners of war. He became a ship's doctor again and worked for the British Colonial Medical Service in Ceylon, and then in Ghana where he died.

== Early life ==
Karel Sperber was born in Tachov, western Bohemia, in 1910 to a Jewish family. He completed his studies in medicine at the German University in Prague and Vienna.

== Second World War ==
In 1939, Sperber escaped to Britain following the invasion of Czechoslovakia by Germany. He was prohibited from practising medicine in Britain because he was considered an "alien". Instead, he took up a post as a ship's doctor and purser on the British merchant and passenger ship SS Automedon, which was delivering important papers to the British Far East Command concerning Japan's possible entry into the Second World War.

On 11 November 1940, his ship was attacked and sunk by the German auxiliary cruiser Atlantis near Sumatra in Indonesia. Sperber and the other surviving members of the ship's crew were taken first to the floating prison, the Norwegian tanker Storstad, and then to Bordeaux. Whilst interned at the camp hospital in Marseille, he, along with an Indian Dr Mitra, kept a look out whilst an escape tunnel was being dug. In late 1942, Sperber was sent to a prison in Bremen following a journey through a number of prisoner-of-war camps. He saved the lives of many British prisoners at Stalag X-B, when an outbreak of typhus occurred.

On 13 December 1942, he entered Auschwitz as a Jewish prisoner, although, as stated in the Geneva convention, he should have been held as a prisoner of war. The number "82512" was tattooed on his arm. There, he worked among a number of Nazi physicians including Josef Mengele, Eduard Wirths, and Friedrich Entress. In addition, he was forced to assist SS physician Carl Clauberg in sterilisation experiments on Jewish women. While in Auschwitz, Sperber smuggled a letter to Charles Coward, asking him to inform Sperber's relatives in Sunderland of his whereabouts.

In 1944, he was sent to work at the prisoner infirmary of the Monowitz concentration camp. On 18 January 1945 he was sent on the death march to Gleiwitz and Buchenwald. After arriving at Buchenwald he and a group of doctors were able to gain admission to the hospital and later worked there as physicians. He subsequently escaped and hid in a forest until he was found by American troops on 1 April 1945.

== Later life ==
After the war, Sperber returned to England. In December 1945, he sent a deposition to the British war crimes authorities about the atrocities he witnessed at Auschwitz which was subsequently used at the Nuremberg Trials.

In 1946, he was appointed an honorary Officer of the Order of the British Empire (OBE) for the medical services he provided to prisoners of war and he received British citizenship in 1948. He signed on as a ship's doctor again and worked for the British Colonial Medical Service in Ceylon (now Sri Lanka) and then in Ghana, where in 1957 he died of Hodgkin's lymphoma in Accra.

(See pp194–6, 'Jews in the Merchant Navy in WW2 - last voices', by Martin Sugarman, VM books, London)
