= Julius Ludolf =

Julius Ludolf (26 March 1893 – 28 May 1947) was an SS-Obersturmführer, a member of the Waffen-SS and commander of various satellite camps of Mauthausen-Gusen concentration camp in Upper Austria.

== Concentration camp career ==
Julius Ludolf worked at concentration camps from January 1940 to May 1945. At first he was commander of concentration camp Loibl, a satellite camp of the Mauthusen Gusen concentration camp system in the Karawanks. In August 1943 he took over for Karl Schöpperle in the subcamp of Großraming and starting from May 1944 the final commander of satellite camp Melk affiliated with the Steyr-Daimler-Puch company.

== After 1945 ==
After the end of war Julius Ludolf was charged along with sixty other camp personnel in the Mauthausen-Gusen camp trials held before a United States military court at Dachau (part of the Dachau Trials). Apart from overall conditions in the camps, which stood under his responsibility, Ludolf was accused of having on different occasions to have personally struck or killed Polish and Russian prisoners between October 1943 and May 1944. He was also accused of having ordered, in October 1944, that sixteen hospitalized Czech and Slovak prisoners be killed by lethal injection. He was charged with having arranged, in July 1944, the execution of Russian prisoner who was recaptured after an escape.

Heard as a witness in his own case, Ludolf said he never killed a prisoner and at most took actions to enforce camp discipline. Executions of camp escapees would not have taken place on his authority. On 13 May 1946 the US court in Dachau found Ludolf guilty and condemned him to death. After his wife's plea for clemency was rejected, Julius Ludolf was executed on 28 May 1947 at Landsberg Prison.
