= August Eigruber =

Austrian-born Nazi politician and war criminal (1907–1947)

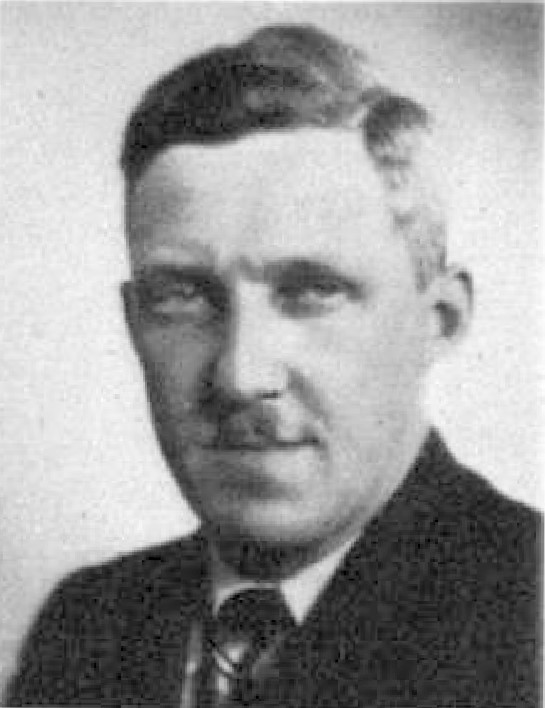
- Eigruber in 1938

Gauleiter of Reichsgau Oberdonau
- In office 22 May 1938 – 5 May 1945

Reichsstatthalter of Reichsgau Oberdonau
- In office 1 April 1940 – 5 May 1945

Landeshauptmann of Upper Austria
- In office 14 May 1938 – 1 April 1940
- Preceded by: Heinrich Gleissner
- Succeeded by: Position abolished

Personal details
- Born: 16 April 1907 Steyr, Austria-Hungary
- Died: 28 May 1947 (aged 40) Landsberg Prison, Landsberg am Lech, Allied-occupied Germany
- Cause of death: Execution by hanging
- Party: Nazi Party
- Children: 5

Military service
- Allegiance: Nazi Germany
- Service: Sturmabteilung; Schutzstaffel
- Service years: 1938–1945
- Rank: SS/SA-Obergruppenführer

August Eigruber (16 April 1907 – 28 May 1947) was an Austrian-born Nazi Gauleiter and Reichsstatthalter of Reichsgau Oberdonau (Upper Danube) and Landeshauptmann of Upper Austria. He was convicted of war crimes at Mauthausen-Gusen concentration camp and hanged.

== Early life and Nazi career ==
August Eigruber was born in Steyr, Austria in 1907. After finishing middle school, Eigruber underwent training in geodesy and fine mechanics at the Austrian Federal Teaching Institution for Iron and Steelworking. Thereafter, he was active in his profession. In November 1922 he joined the National Socialist Worker Youth of Austria, whose leader he became in 1925. In April 1928, he joined the Nazi Party, whose Steyr-Land district leadership he took up in October 1930. For his activities in the Party, which was banned in Austria, Eigruber was sentenced to several months in prison. From May 1935, Eigruber was the Gau Director (Gaugeschäftsführer) for the banned Party in the Upper Austria Gau, and he took over complete leadership of the Gau as of 1936.

== Career in the Nazi state ==
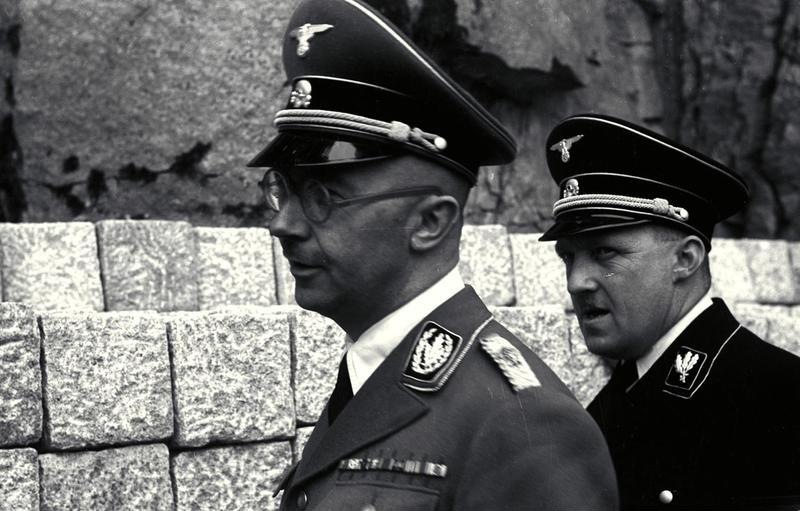
Eigruber with Reichsführer-SS Heinrich Himmler at Mauthausen in 1941.

After the Anschluss, he was appointed Landeshauptmann of Upper Austria on 14 March 1938. At the 10 April parliamentary election, he was elected as a deputy of the German Reichstag, representing the newly renamed Ostmark. On 1 June 1938, Eigruber joined the Sturmabteilung (SA), with the rank of SA-Brigadeführer effective 12 March. On 25 July, he also joined the Schutzstaffel (SS) as a Standartenführer also with an effective date of 12 March. On 22 May Adolf Hitler appointed him Gauleiter of Reichsgau Oberdonau. He thus united under his control the highest party and governmental offices in his jurisdiction.

In September 1938, Gauleiter Eigruber attended the Reichsparteitag in Nuremberg. When Passau Nazis met at the Deutschmeister Inn, Eigruber joined his allies and reminisced about their venture during the Kampfjahre.

He rose to the rank of SS-Brigadeführer in January 1939 and to SS-Gruppenführer in November 1940. On 1 April 1940, he was installed as Reichsstatthalter (Reich Governor) of Oberdonau. In July 1940, the Donau-Zeitung announced that August Eigruber would travel to Passau by ship. There, he would be ceremonially welcomed at City Hall, and attend the latest play by Hans Baumann. On 16 November 1942 came his appointment as Reich Defense Commissioner (Reichsverteidigungskommissar) for his Gau. On 21 June 1943, Eigruber was promoted to the rank of SS-Obergruppenführer. He was also made an SA-Obergruppenführer on 9 November 1943.

In February 1945, 500 Soviet POWs escaped from Mauthausen. In response, SS soldiers, SA detachments, and Volkssturm men, who were acting on Eigruber's orders, hunted the POWs down in the Mühlviertler Hasenjagd. Nearly all of them were murdered. As for those who were captured, a witness said they heard Eigruber telling commandant Franz Ziereis that "All these pigs will have to be finished."

Toward the end of the war, as U.S. forces approached his capital at Linz, he proclaimed the city a "fortress" to be defended to the bitter end. In April 1945, shortly before the arrival of U.S. forces, he ordered the mass executions of 42 resistance fighters. However, shortly after the beginning of the offensive on 5 May 1945, he fled and proclaimed Linz an open city. He managed to hide out using forged identification papers until 11 August 1945, but was arrested by US Army Counterintelligence, in Sankt Pankraz (a few miles south of Kirchdorf an der Krems).

== Conviction and execution ==
At the Mauthausen-Gusen camp trials, held under the jurisdiction of the Dachau International Military Tribunal, he was sentenced to death by hanging on 13 May 1946 for his responsibility for crimes at Mauthausen concentration camp, where tens of thousands of prisoners died. The sentence was carried out in the prison yard at Landsberg Prison on 28 May 1947. Eigruber's last words were "Lord, take care of Germany. Lord, take care of my family. Lord, take care of my children. I regard it as an honor to be hanged by the most brutal of victors. Long live Germany!"

== Decorations and awards ==
- Anschluss Medal, c.1938
- Sudetenland Medal, 1939
- Honour Chevron for the Old Guard, 25.5.1938
- Golden Party Badge, 30.1.1939
- Clasp to the Sudetenland Medal, 1939
- Nazi Party Long Service Award in Bronze, Silver and Gold, 1940–1942

== See also ==
- List of Gauleiters
- List of governors of Upper Austria
- List of Nazi Party leaders and officials
- List of Axis personnel indicted for war crimes
