= Erich Wasicky =

Austrian SS officer (1911–1947)

Erich Wasicky (May 27, 1911, in Vienna – May 28, 1947, at Landsberg Prison, Landsberg am Lech, Allied-occupied Germany (aged 36)) was a pharmacist at the Mauthausen concentration camp in charge of gassing victims.

Wasicky was a physician. He joined the NSDAP and was a member of the SS. Between 1941 and 1944, he worked as a pharmacist at Mauthausen concentration camp. It was his duty to select victims to die in the gas chamber. The exact number of his victims is not known, but more than 3,100 died in neighboring Hartheim concentration camp, which fell under Wasicky's jurisdiction. After the Nazis started using the poison Zyklon B, Wasicky was put in charge of establishing this process in both Mauthausen and Hartheim.

According to witnesses, Wasicky worked closely with SS doctor Aribert Heim. The two performed gruesome experiments together, such as injecting various solutions into the hearts of Jewish prisoners to see which killed them the fastest.

After the end of World War II, Wasicky was tried for war crimes by a U.S. military tribunal. On May 13, 1946, he was found guilty and sentenced to death. On May 28, 1947, he was hanged at Landsberg Prison. Wasicky was originally scheduled to be hanged on May 27, 1947, which was his birthday. He requested that his execution be delayed until the next day. The request was granted.
