= Hans Maršálek =

Austrian typesetter and activist (1914–2011)

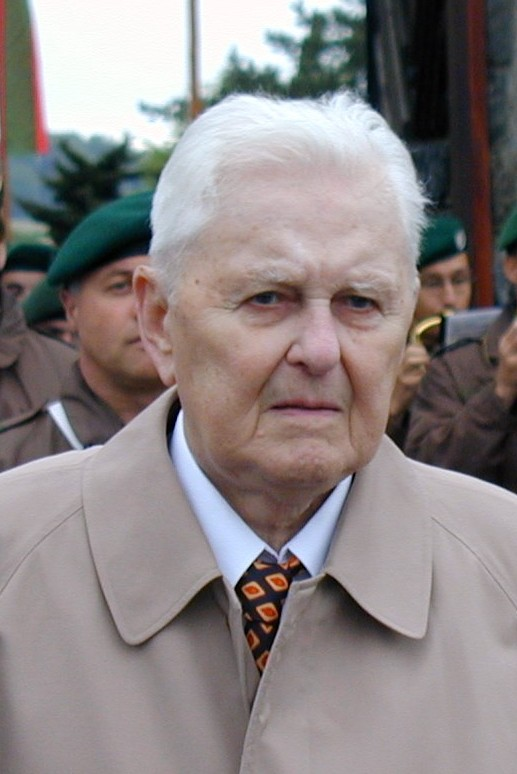
Maršálek in 2001

Hans Maršálek (19 July 1914 – 9 December 2011) was an Austrian typesetter, political activist, detective, historian, and spy for the Czechoslovak secret police. A devout socialist and active in the resistance, he was arrested by the Nazis and imprisoned in the Mauthausen concentration camp. After the war, he joined the Austrian political police and was instrumental in tracking down and convicting numerous Nazi criminals. He also became the main chronicler of the camp's history, helped establish the Mauthausen Memorial Museum, and published several books. Jan Marsalek, a fugitive former businessman and confirmed spy operative for Russia, is his grandson.

== Early life ==
Maršálek was born on 19 July 1914 in Vienna to an ethnically Czech family. His father was a builder, his mother worked as a maid. The family lived in Hernals, a working-class district, in humble circumstances. Both parents were members of the Social Democratic Party; Maršálek's father eventually was elected to the Hernals district council on a Social Democratic ticket.

Maršálek was educated in Vienna's Czech School. In his teens, he apprenticed as a typesetter for one of the city's Czech-language newspapers. Following in the footsteps of his parents, Maršálek was politically active from an early age. He was active in the Socialist Workers' Youth and, from 1936 to 1938, in the resistance against the Austrofascist Ständestaat regime. He was arrested and subjected to brutal interrogations for being a member of the Austrian wing of the International Red Aid, an organisation supporting persecuted left-wing dissidents. He also had ties to revolutionary socialists, in particular Johann Otto Haas, and to the Czech communist movement.

== Nazi Germany ==
Following the 1938 integration of Austria into Nazi Germany, Maršálek fled to Prague to dodge the draft but remained politically active in the Social Democratic expat community. After the German occupation of Czechoslovakia in 1939, he joined the communist resistance. For the next two years, his main activity was helping German and Austrian dissidents flee the Reich.

In 1941, Maršálek was sent back to Vienna with the mission of finding and recruiting communist-leaning Wehrmacht soldiers. In spite of his wealth of old contacts and the assistance of his Viennese girlfriend, Anna Vavak, the trip was a failure. The population was still enamored with the Nazi movement. Even most erstwhile Nazi opponents had become infected with infatuation and avoided Maršálek, rationalizing that Nazism might be distasteful but resistance was pointless. Observing that seemingly everyone but him was convinced the Nazis would utterly triumph, Maršálek at times questioned his own sanity. Defeated and humiliated, he returned to Prague in August 1941.

In September 1941, the Gestapo launched a mass arrest of members of what they called "the Czech section" of the Austrian Communist Party. Even though he didn't technically fit the bill, Maršálek was caught in the dragnet and arrested on 28 October 1941. After stints in various jails, including three months in a basement in the city's infamous Morzinplatz Gestapo headquarters, he was moved to the Mauthausen concentration camp on 28 September 1942. His prisoner's number was 13,129.

At first put to work in quarrying and logging teams, he was used for clerical work in the camp's office beginning in 1943. In late 1943, an in-camp resistance group formed; Maršálek promptly joined. The group worked to get conspirators assigned to Kapo positions, where they would use what little influence they had to save as many prisoners from death as possible. By March 1944, the camp's office was staffed exclusively by members of the underground. By May 1944, Maršálek was the camp's second highest-ranking clerk. As planned, he used his position to protect ailing fellow prisoners by manipulating their work assignments and to generally be a spanner in the works. He organized acts of sabotage and saved the lives of numerous prisoners.

== After the liberation ==
When Mauthausen was liberated in May 1945, Maršálek used his resistance connections to help care for and repatriate prisoners. He interrogated Franz Ziereis, the ex-commandant of Mauthausen, who had been captured by the Americans and shot three times in the process. The commandant died immediately after the interrogation. On 28 May he returned to Vienna and joined the State Police (Staatspolizei), Austria's domestic political security agency.

In 1946, Maršálek married Anna Vavak, who had been imprisoned in the Ravensbrück concentration camp. She died in 1959. According to German weekly Die Zeit, he was hired as an StB agent in 1946.

Drawing on his intimate knowledge about camp and SS internals, he played an important role in prosecuting Nazi criminals of war, especially in the early days. He was a material witness in the Mauthausen-Gusen camp trials, a series of trials held from 29 March to 13 May 1946. The Mauthausen-Gusen camp trials involved 69 defendants, including much of the surviving camp administration on the one hand and top-level supervisors such as Gauleiter August Eigruber on the other hand. With 61 defendants found guilty and 58 death sentences handed down, the camp trials remain the most stringent and successful attempt at holding Mauthausen criminals accountable.

An affidavit written by Maršálek also played a role in the Nuremberg trials.

Maršálek was active in the Austrian organization of Mauthausen survivors, the Lagergemeinschaft Mauthausen. Starting in 1946, he helped establish the Mauthausen Memorial. He became the camp's main chronicler, tirelessly collecting documentation. His magnum opus, the History of the Mauthausen Concentration Camp (Geschichte des Konzentrationslagers Mauthausen), first published in 1974. is considered the definitive account on the Austrian branch of the Nazi extermination through labour machine.

In 1952, Maršálek became a founding member of the Comité International de Mauthausen, the international counterpart to the Lagergemeinschaft.

In 1963, the Austrian Ministry of the Interior invited Maršálek to establish a museum in the former concentration camp, which had been declared a national memorial site in 1949. Maršálek accepted and took over as the director of the Mauthausen Memorial, a position he filled until his retirement in 1976. On 3 May 1975, the 30th anniversary of the camp's liberation, Maršálek's museum was inaugurated by Chancellor Bruno Kreisky.

== Death ==
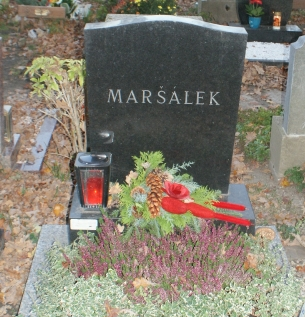
Feuerhalle Simmering, grave of Hans Maršálek

Maršálek died on 9 December 2011 in Vienna. He was cremated at Feuerhalle Simmering, where also his ashes are buried.

== Honours ==
Maršálek has been called one of the most important members of the Austrian resistance. On 24 November 2009, he received an honorary doctorate in social science from the Johannes Kepler University of Linz. The Hans Maršálek Prize for excellence in memorial, remembrance and awareness work, awarded by the Austrian Mauthausen Committee and the Austrian Camp Association Mauthausen, is named in his honour.

== Publications ==
- Hacker, Kurt and Maršálek, Hans (1995): Kurzgeschichte des Konzentrationslager Mauthausen und seiner drei größten Nebenlager Gusen, Ebensee, Melk. Österreichische Lagergemeinschaft Mauthausen. Vienna, Austria.
- Kohl, Josef and Maršálek, Hans (1950): Das war Mauthausen. Globus. Vienna, Austria. No ISBN
- Maršálek, Hans (1947): Mauthausen mahnt! Kampf hinter Stacheldraht. Tatsachen, Dokumente und Berichte über das grösste Hitler'sche Vernichtungslager in Österreich. Globus. Vienna, Austria. No ISBN
- Maršálek, Hans (1988): Die Vergasungsaktionen im Konzentrationslager Mauthausen: Gaskammer, Gaswagen, Vergasungsanstalt Hartheim, Tarnnamen. Österreichische Lagergemeinschaft Mauthausen. Vienna, Austria.
- Maršálek, Hans (2006): Die Geschichte des Konzentrationslagers Mauthausen. Dokumentation. 4. Auflage. Edition Mauthausen. ISBN 3-7035-1235-0
