= Ried in der Riedmark =

- Municipality
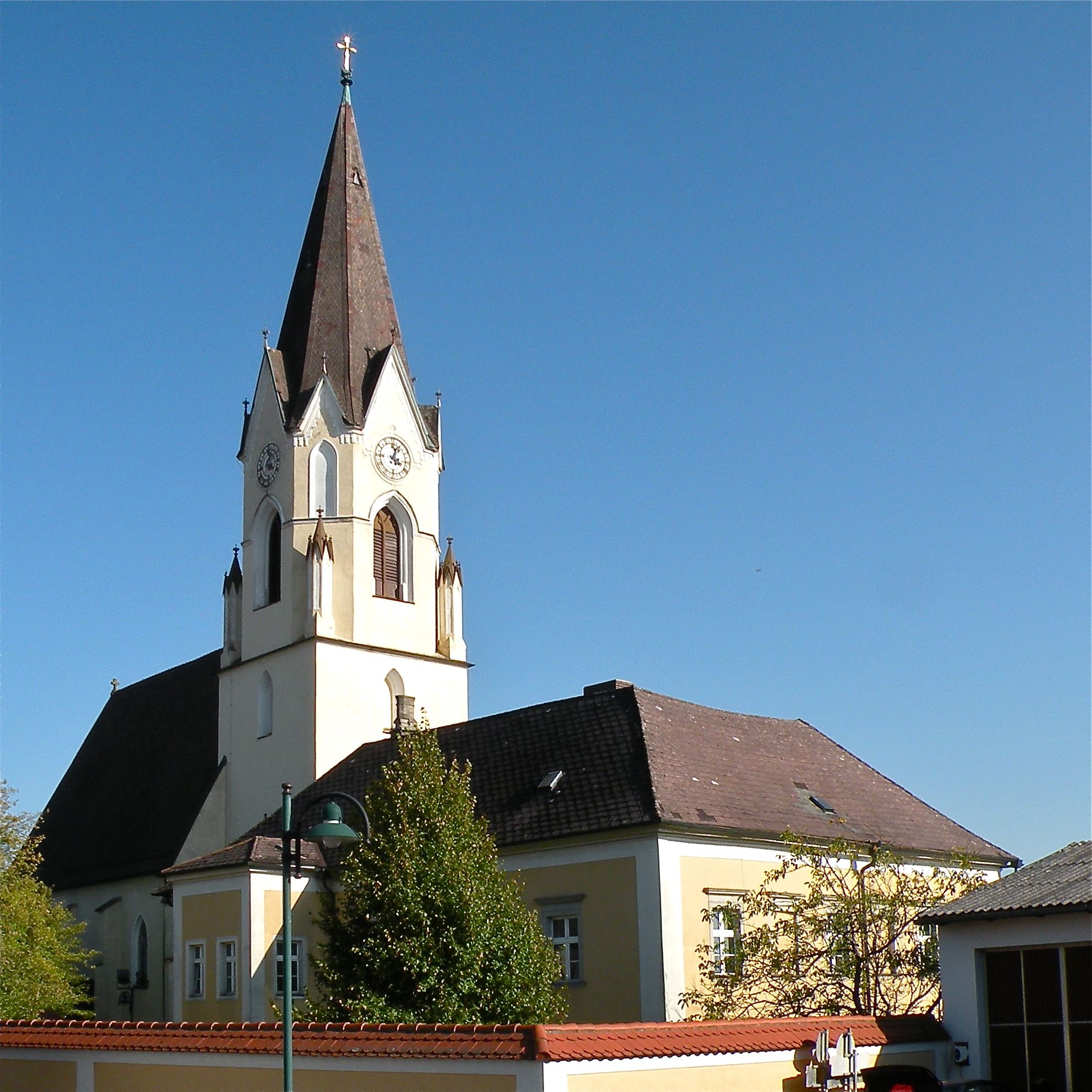

- Coat of arms

- Location within Austria
- Coordinates: 48°16′16″N 14°32′44″E
- Country: Austria
- State: Upper Austria
- District: Perg

Government
  - Mayor: Christian Tauschek (SPÖ)

Area
  - Total: 32.65 km^{2} (12.61 sq mi)
- Elevation: 306 m (1,004 ft)

Population (2025-01-01)
  - Total: 4,394
  - Density: 134.6/km^{2} (348.6/sq mi)
- Time zone: UTC+1 (CET)
  - Summer (DST): UTC+2 (CEST)
- Postal code: 4312
- Area code: 07238
- Vehicle registration: PE
- Website: www.ried-riedmark.at

Ried in der Riedmark is a municipality in the district of Perg in the Austrian state of Upper Austria.

== Geography ==
Ried lies in the Mühlviertel. About 19 percent of the municipality is forest, and 71 percent is farmland.
