= Mauthausen-Gusen camp trials =

War crimes trial

The Mauthausen-Gusen camp trials were a set of trials of SS concentration camp personnel following World War II, heard by an American military government court at Dachau. Between March 29 and May 13, 1946, and then from August 6 to August 21, 1947, a total of 69 former camp personnel were tried. Among them were some of the former guards at the Mauthausen-Gusen concentration camp system and August Eigruber, a former Gauleiter of Upper Austria.

== Origins ==
In 1942, overwhelming reports of German atrocities and large scale massacres against concentration camp inhabitants came to surface from exiled governments and Jewish organizations. With increased tension from the public and overwhelming evidence, the Allied powers being the United States, Great Britain, and the Soviet Union had no choice but to intervene. The Allied powers issued a statement condemning the actions of those involved and promising to bring each and every SS personnel to justice with no chance of dismissal. The Allied nations' foreign ministers met in Russia a year later and were better known as ‘The Big Three’. Those who committed war crimes were broken up into two war crimes categories. These groups were divided by those with no particular geographic location who would be punished by the Allies, and those who committed crimes within a specific location who would be tried in courts within their jurisdiction. The United States involvement within the trials had difficulties ranging from a lack of international policy knowledge and being understaffed, which led to pure chaos. Those sent to investigate the war crimes lacked proper training which yielded reports with sub-par information. The U.S. encountered countless obstacles. Ultimately in 1945, the United States committed to two distinct war crimes trial programs, one under American military jurisdiction and one in collaboration with the Allied powers.

== First Mauthausen camp trial ==
The first trial of personnel from Mauthausen-Gusen took place in the Dachau concentration camp between March 29 and May 13, 1946. Among the accused were 60 former members of the camp's administration and August Eigruber, a former Gauleiter of Upper Austria. Among the defendants were also Viktor Zoller (former commander of the SS-Totenkopfverbande guard battalion), and doctors Friedrich Entress (an SS member and a medic who practiced medical experiments on hundreds of inmates; killing most of them with injections of phenol), Eduard Krebsbach and Erich Wasicky handed the Zyklon B to the person who was responsible for running camp's gas chambers who was Dr. Eduard Krebsbach based on the deathbed confession of Commander Ziereis. The Mauthausen-Gusen commander, Franz Ziereis, was shot several weeks after the liberation of the Mauthausen-Gusen camps and died in former Camp Gusen I on May 24, 1945.

Robert Lévy, who served as a prisoner-doctor at Auschwitz, had his notes presented at the trial. Levy had been arrested on May 12, 1943, in Limoges and deported from Drancy on September 2, 1943, then deported to Auschwitz in 1944 and belonged to the concentration camp personnel conducting medical treatments at the Auschwitz II Birkenau death factory. He worked in the surgical block where the records were also kept. In his notes presented at the Nuremberg Trials (SS im Einsatz, 167/2), Lévy mentioned "losing" 96% of his patients on several occasions. Every now and then, new selections among prisoners made to strip naked, were arranged on the block by head-doctor Friedrich Entress. The injured – who were unable to return to work considerably quickly – were sent right away for the so-called "special handling" (Sonderbehandlung) at Block 20, which meant one thing: the phenol injection.

The defendants were charged with "violations of the laws and usages of war," a charge which encompassed among other things murder, torture, beating and starving the inmates. After six weeks all 61 defendants were found guilty. 58 were sentenced to death by hanging (9 had their sentences changed to life imprisonment and were later paroled), while three others were sentenced to life imprisonment. All but one of the death sentences were carried out on May 27 and 28, 1947, at Landsberg Prison. The sole exception was Otto Striegel, who won a last-minute stay of execution. Striegel was hanged on June 20, 1947.

=== Defendants ===
The defendants of the first Mauthausen camp trial (US v. Hans Altfuldisch, et al.), and their sentences, are as follows:

1. August Eigruber – death by hanging
2. Viktor Zoller – death by hanging
3. Friedrich Entress – death by hanging
4. Johann Altfuldisch – death by hanging
5. Josef Riegler – death by hanging
6. Willy Brünning (Gusen) – death by hanging
7. Emil Müller – death by hanging
8. Kurt Keilwtz – death by hanging
9. Franz Kautny – death by hanging
10. Johannes Grimm (DEST-Wienergraben) – death by hanging
11. Adolf Zutter – death by hanging
12. Eduard Krebsbach – death by hanging
13. Heinrich Häger – death by hanging
14. Hans Spatzenneger – death by hanging
15. Otto Striegel – death by hanging
16. Werner Grahn – death by hanging
17. Wilhelm Jobst – death by hanging
18. Georg Gössl – death by hanging
19. Hans Diehl – death by hanging
20. Paul Kaiser (Gusen) – death by hanging
21. Waldemar Wolter – death by hanging
22. Gustav Kreindl – death by hanging
23. Willy Eckert – death by hanging
24. Hermann Pribyll – death by hanging
25. Josef Leeb – death by hanging
26. Wilhelm Henkel – death by hanging
27. Kapo Willy Frey – death by hanging
28. Leopold Trauner (DEST-Gusen) – death by hanging
29. Wilhelm Müller – death by hanging
30. Heinrich Eisenhöfer – death by hanging
31. Andreas Trumm – death by hanging
32. Rudolf Mynzak – death by hanging
33. Erich Meissner – death by hanging
34. Kapo Rudolf Fiegl (Gusen) – death by hanging
35. Josef Niedermayer – death by hanging
36. Julius Ludolf – death by hanging
37. Hans Hegenscheidt – death by hanging
38. Franz Huber – death by hanging
39. Erich Wasicky – death by hanging
40. Theophil Priebel – death by hanging
41. Kaspar Klimowitsch (Gusen II) – death by hanging
42. Heinrich Fitschok (Gusen II) – death by hanging
43. Anton Kaufmann (DEST-Gusen) – death by hanging
44. Stefan Barczey – death by hanging
45. Karl Struller – death by hanging
46. August Blei – death by hanging
47. Otto Drabeck – death by hanging
48. Vincenz Nohel – death by hanging
49. Thomas Sigmund (Gusen) – death by hanging
50. Heinrich Giese (Gusen) – death by hanging (changed to life imprisonment)
51. Walter Höhler – death by hanging (changed to life imprisonment)
52. Adolf Rutka (Gusen) – death by hanging (changed to life imprisonment)
53. Ludwig Dörr (Gusen II) – death by hanging (changed to life imprisonment)
54. Viktor Korger (Gusen II) – death by hanging (changed to life imprisonment)
55. Karl Billman (Gusen II) – death by hanging (changed to life imprisonment)
56. Herbert Grzybowski (Gusen) – death by hanging (changed to life imprisonment)
57. Wilhelm Mack (Gusen) – death by hanging (changed to life imprisonment)
58. Ferdinand Lappert (Gusen) – death by hanging (changed to life imprisonment)
59. Michael Cserny – life imprisonment
60. Paul Gützlaff (Gusen) – life imprisonment
61. Josef Mayer – life imprisonment

== Second Mauthausen camp trial ==
The second Mauthausen camp trial started on August 6, 1947. Altogether 8 former members of the camp's administration were accused of the same set of crimes as in the former trial. On August 21, the verdict was reached. Four defendants were sentenced to death by hanging, one to life imprisonment, two to short prison terms, and one was acquitted. The death sentences were carried out on November 19, 1948.

=== Defendants ===
The defendants of the second Mauthausen camp trial (US v. Franz Kofler, et al. ), and their sentences, are as follows:

1. Franz Kofler – death by hanging (executed on November 19, 1948)
2. Gustav Petrat – death by hanging (executed on November 19, 1948)
3. Kapo Quirin Flaucher – death by hanging (executed on November 19, 1948)
4. Michael Heller – death by hanging (executed on November 19, 1948)
5. Emil Thielmann – life imprisonment
6. Hermann Franz Bütgen – 3 years in prison
7. Arno Albert Reuter – 2 years in prison
8. Stefan Lennart – acquitted

== Additional trials ==
An additional 56 trials took place between March and November 1947 within the framework of the Mauthausen cases of individuals or small groups.
