= Franz Ziereis =

German SS officer (1905–1945)

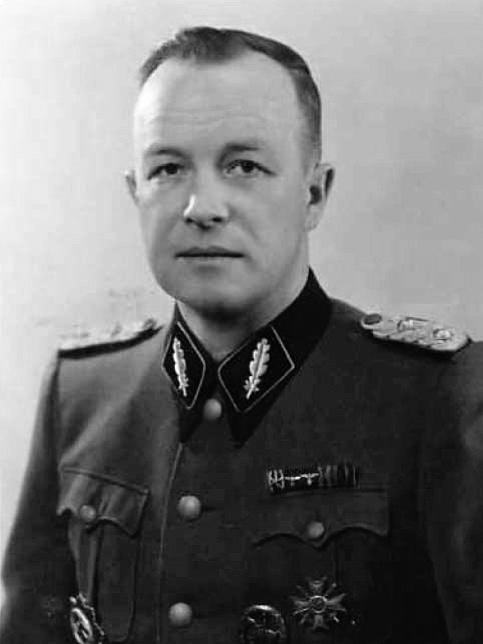
- Born: 13 August 1905; Munich, Kingdom of Bavaria, German Empire
- Died: 24 May 1945 (aged 39); Mauthausen-Gusen, Upper Austria, Allied-occupied Austria
- Cause of death: Gunshot wounds

Franz Xaver Ziereis (13 August 1905 – 24 May 1945) was the commandant of the Mauthausen concentration camp from 1939 until the camp was liberated by American forces in 1945.

== Biography ==
=== Early life ===
Ziereis was born on 13 August 1905 in Munich, Kingdom of Bavaria, German Empire (now in Bavaria, Germany), where he spent 8 years in elementary school and then began as an apprentice and messenger boy in a department store. In the evenings he studied commerce. In 1922 he went to work as a labourer in a carpentry shop.

=== SS career ===
Ziereis joined the Reichswehr—the army of the Weimar Republic—on 1 April 1924, for a period of 12 years. He was discharged with the rank of sergeant in 1936 and joined the Schutzstaffel—"SS"—on September 30 of the same year. He attained the rank of SS-Obersturmführer and was assigned as a training instructor to the SS-Totenkopfverbände. In 1937 he was given command of a Totenkopfverbände unit and later became a training instructor.

=== Concentration camp commandant ===
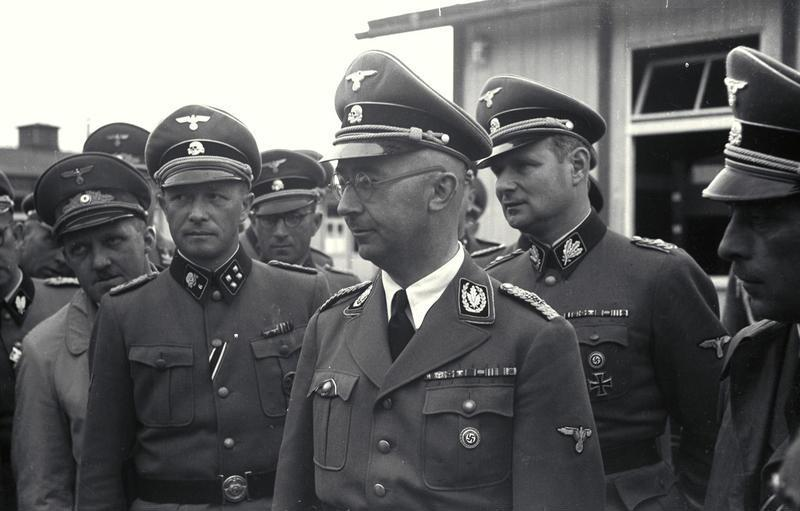
Ziereis (left) with Heinrich Himmler (center) and Karl Wolff (right) at Mauthausen in 1941

Zeireis replaced Albert Sauer as commandant of Mauthausen concentration camp on 9 February 1939 by order of Theodor Eicke, an inspector of concentration camps. On 25 August 1939, Ziereis received a promotion to the rank of SS-Sturmbannführer and, on 20 April 1944 he received his final promotion to SS-Standartenführer.

=== Post-war flight and death ===
Ziereis fled with his wife on 3 May 1945, but was tracked down 160 kilometres (100 miles) away by an U.S. army unit on 23 May 1945. As he attempted to escape, American soldiers proceeded to shoot Ziereis three times in the stomach and brought him to a U.S. military hospital set up at the former Gusen I concentration camp. Enraged prisoners had to be stopped from beating him to death.

Ziereis died from his wounds shortly after interrogation by a former inmate of Mauthausen, socialist Hans Maršálek. In a confession, he had implicated several leading perpetrators at the camp, including Eduard Krebsbach, who had ordered the building of the gas chamber at Mauthausen, Erich Wasicky, who had built the gas van there, and Gauleiter August Eigruber, who was chiefly responsible for the conditions since the area fell under his jurisdiction.

His corpse was later hung on the fence of Gusen I by former prisoners of Gusen. Krebsbach, Wasicky, and Eigruber were later tried at the Mauthausen-Gusen camp trials and executed.

== See also ==
- List of Nazi Party leaders and officials
- Glossary of Nazi Germany
- List of SS personnel
