= Landsberg Prison =

Historic prison in Landsberg am Lech, Bavaria, Germany

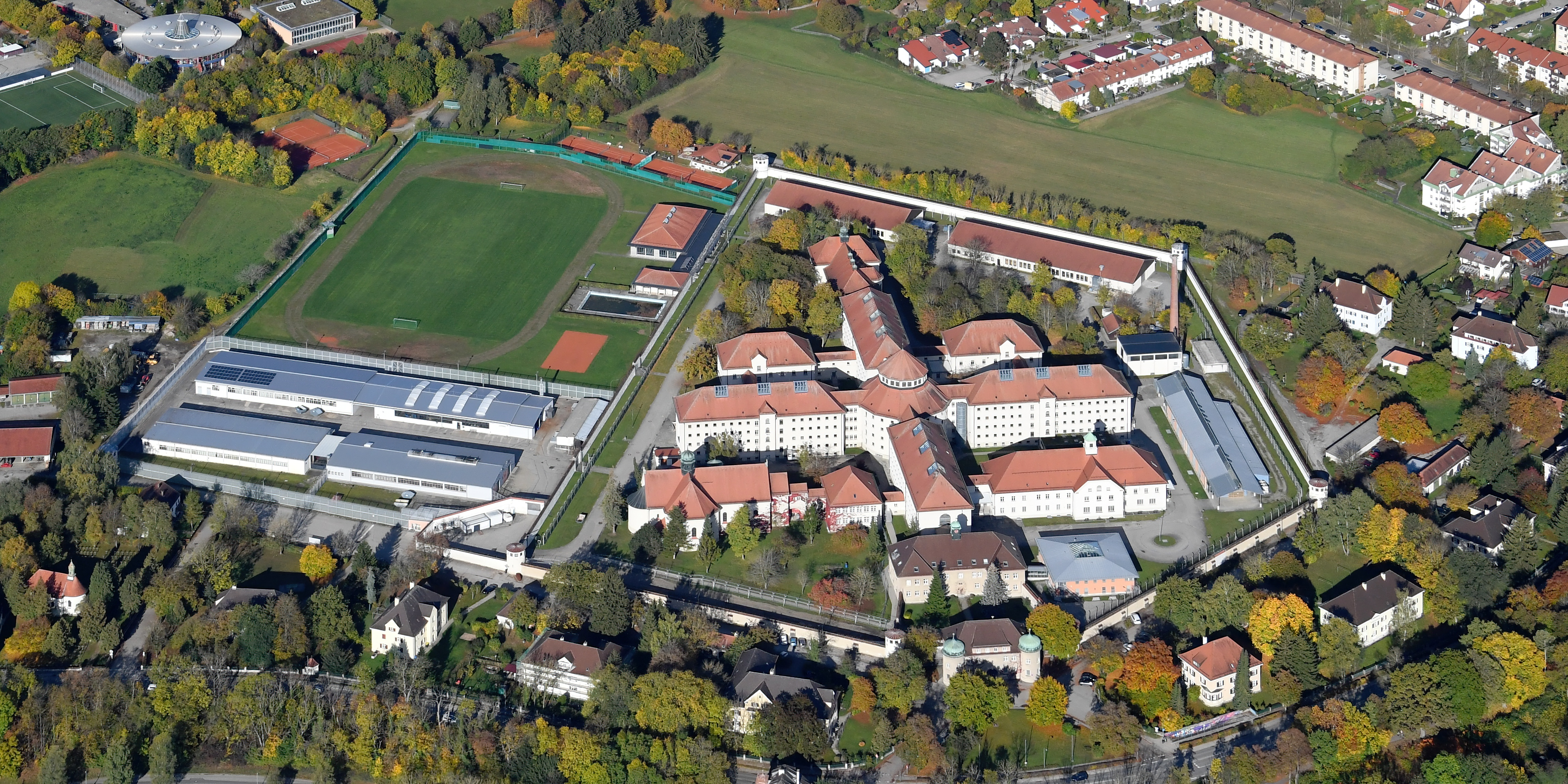
- Aerial view of Landsberg Prison (2022)
- Interactive map of Landsberg Prison
- Location: Landsberg am Lech, Bavaria, Germany; 48°03′15″N 10°52′00″E
- Status: Operational
- Capacity: 800
- Population: ~724 average
- Opened: 1910
- Former name: War Criminal Prison No. 1
- Managed by: Bavarian Ministry of Justice

Landsberg Prison (German: Justizvollzugsanstalt Landsberg, lit. 'Landsberg Justice-Enforcement-Institution') is a prison in the town of Landsberg am Lech in the southwest of the German state of Bavaria, about 65 kilometres (40 mi) west-southwest of Munich and 35 kilometres (22 mi) south of Augsburg. It is best known as the prison where Adolf Hitler was held in 1924 after the failed Beer Hall Putsch in Munich and where he dictated his memoir Mein Kampf to Rudolf Hess.

The prison was used by the Allied powers during the occupation of Germany for holding Nazi war criminals. In 1946, general Joseph T. McNarney, commander in chief of the U.S. Forces of Occupation in Germany, renamed Landsberg War Criminal Prison No. 1 (Kriegsverbrechergefängnis Nr. 1).

The Americans closed the war crimes facility in 1958. Full control of the prison was then handed over to the Federal Republic of Germany. Landsberg is now maintained by the Prison Service of the Bavarian Ministry of Justice.

== Early years ==
Landsberg Prison, which is in the town's western outskirts, was completed in 1910. The facility was designed with an Art Nouveau frontage by Hugo von Höfl. Within its walls, the four brick-built cell blocks were constructed in a cross-shape orientation. This allowed guards to watch all wings simultaneously from a central location (based on the Panopticon style).

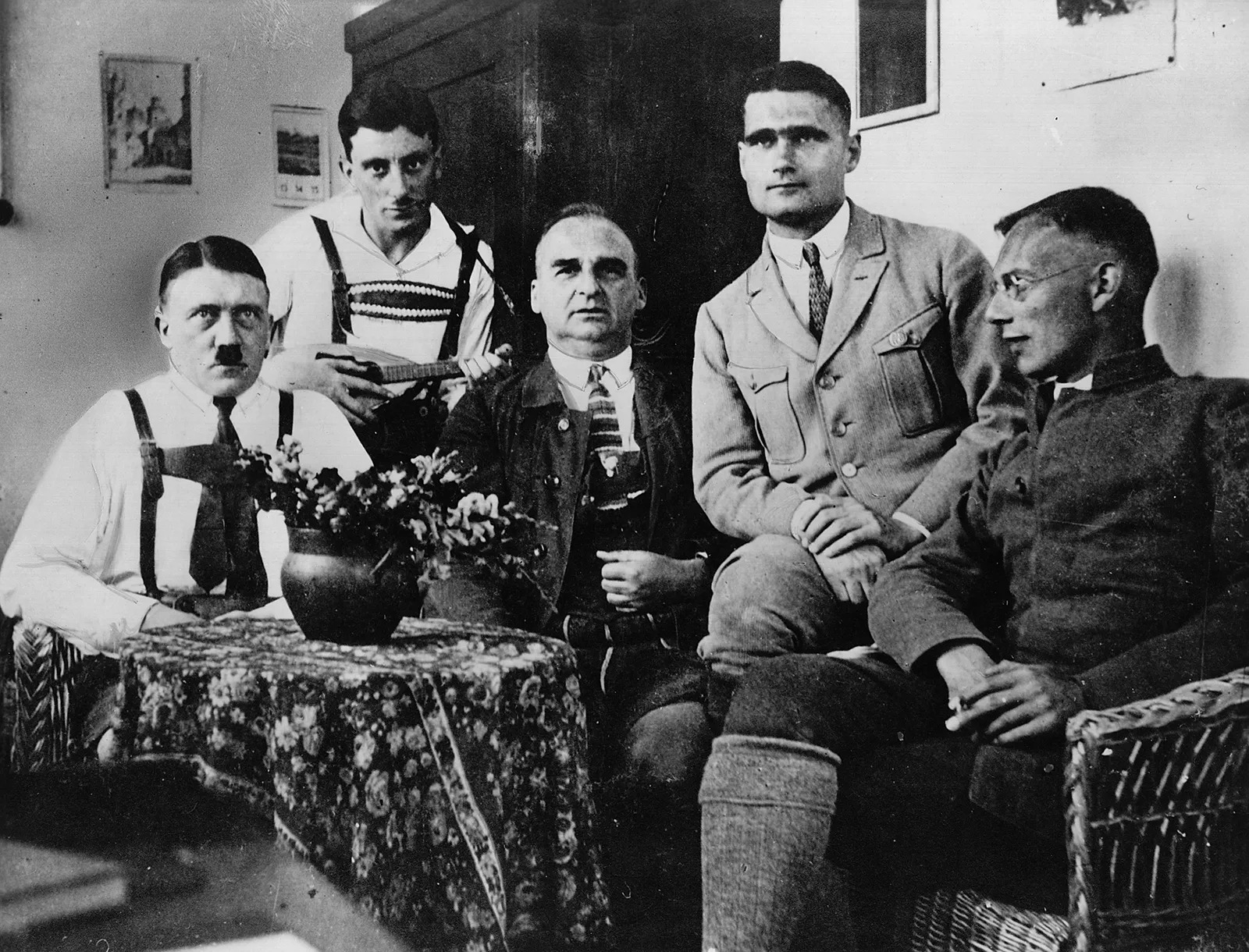
Adolf Hitler, Emil Maurice, Hermann Kriebel, Rudolf Hess, and Friedrich Weber at Landsberg Prison in 1924

Landsberg, which was used for holding convicted criminals and those awaiting sentencing, was also designated a Festungshaft ('fortress confinement') prison. Festungshaft was a lighter form of imprisonment, usually for high-ranked convicts. Prisoners were excluded from forced labor and had reasonably comfortable cells. They were also allowed to receive visitors. Anton Graf von Arco-Valley, who shot Bavarian prime minister Kurt Eisner, was given a Festungshaft sentence in February 1919.

In 1924 Adolf Hitler spent 264 days incarcerated in Landsberg after being convicted of treason following the Beer Hall Putsch in Munich the previous year. During his imprisonment, Hitler dictated and then wrote his book Mein Kampf with assistance from his deputy, Rudolf Hess.

Numerous foreign political prisoners of the Nazis were deported to Germany and imprisoned in Landsberg. Between early 1944 and the end of the war, at least 210 prisoners died in Landsberg as a result of mistreatment or execution.

== United States Army ==
American soldiers liberating Landsberg am Lech on 30 April 1945

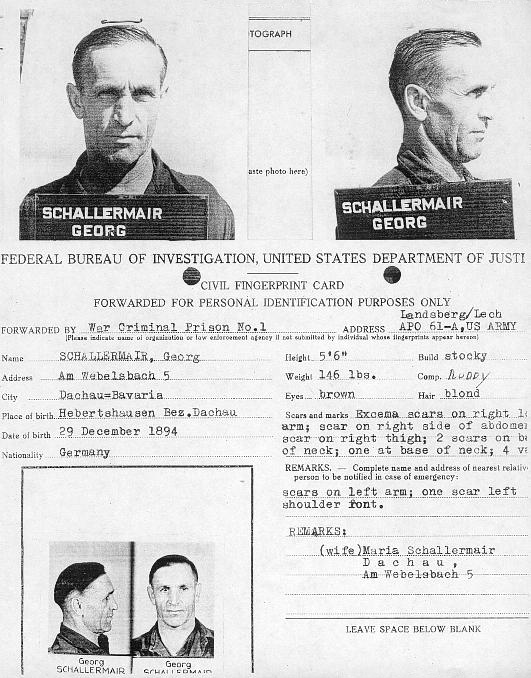
Record card of former SS-Hauptscharführer Georg Schallermair, who worked at the Mühldorf subcamp. After he was sentenced to death at the Dachau Trials, Schallermair was hanged at Landsberg in 1951.

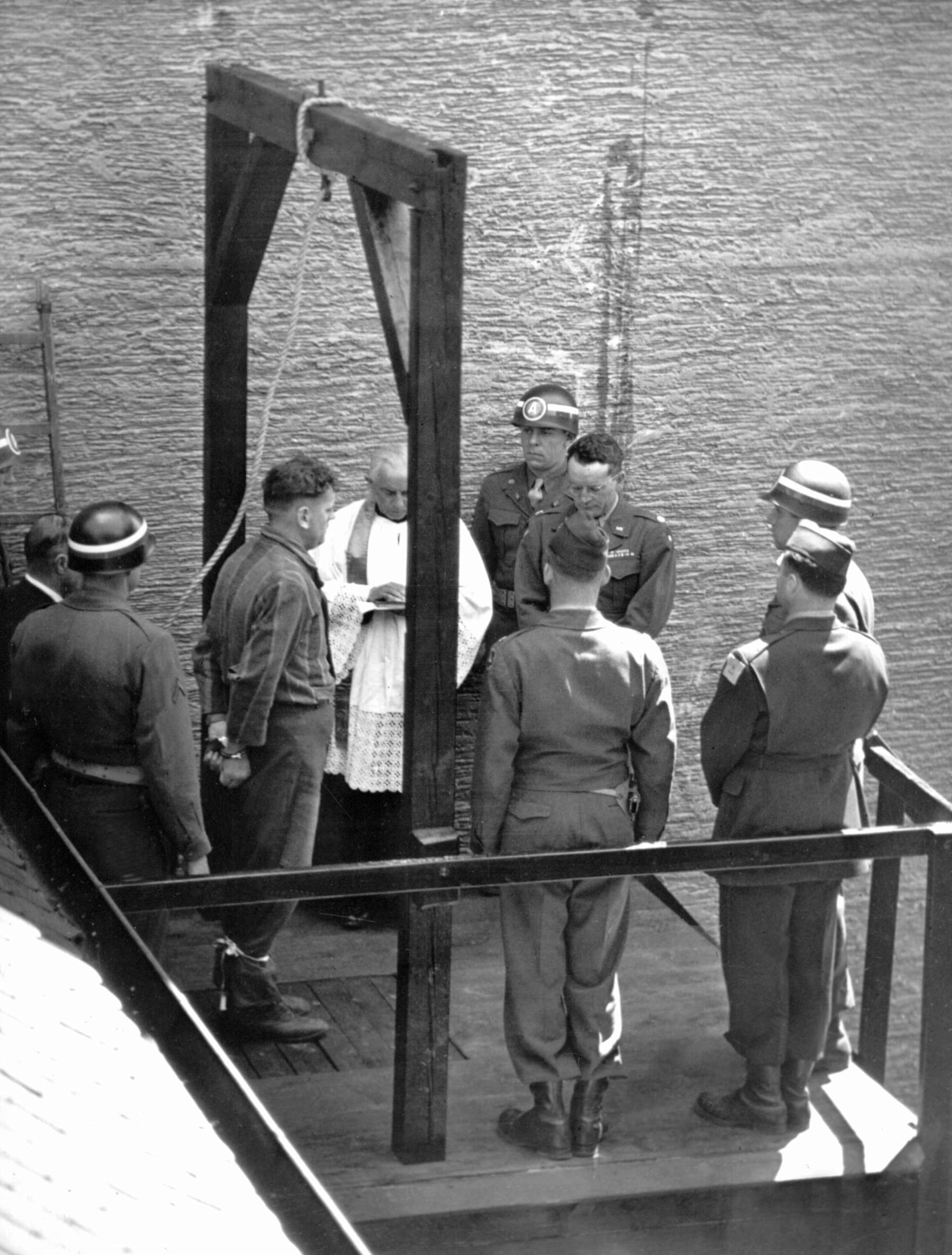
Convicted war criminal shortly before being hanged at Landsberg Prison. Chaplain Karl Morgenschweis is praying for him.

During the occupation of Germany by the Allies after World War II, the US Army designated the prison as War Criminal Prison No. 1 to hold convicted Nazi war criminals. It was run and guarded by personnel from the United States Army's Military Police (MPs).

The first condemned prisoners arrived at Landsberg prison in December 1945. These war criminals had been sentenced to death for crimes against humanity at the Dachau Trials which had begun a month earlier.

Between 1945 and 1946, the prison housed a total of 110 prisoners convicted at the subsequent Nuremberg trials, a further 1416 war criminals from the Dachau trials and 21 prisoners convicted in the Shanghai trials. (These were military tribunals conducted by the American forces in Japan between August 1946 and January 1947 to prosecute 23 German officials who had continued to assist the Japanese military in Shanghai after the surrender of Nazi Germany.)

In five-and-a-half years, Landsberg Prison was the place of execution of 252 condemned war criminals, all of them by hanging. Executions were carried out expeditiously. In May 1946, 28 former SS guards from Dachau were hanged within a four-day period. Bodies that were not claimed were buried in unmarked graves in the cemetery next to the Spöttingen chapel.

The prison was also used for the executions of common criminals. Thirty-three common criminals, including one U.S. soldier who had been court-martialed for murdering a civilian, were executed between 1947 and 1949, 29 of them by firing squad.

== Prisoners ==
Notable former members of the Third Reich who were sent to the U.S. Army's prison at Landsberg included:

- Gottlob Berger
- Paul Blobel
- Karl Brandt
- Fritz Dietrich
- Sepp Dietrich
- Friedrich Entress
- Hellmuth Felmy
- Otto Hofmann
- Karl-Adolf Hollidt
- Hermann Hoth
- Waldemar Klingelhöfer
- Gustav Knittel
- Ilse Koch
- Eduard Krebsbach
- Alfried Krupp
- Hans Lammers
- Wilhelm List
- Erhard Milch
- Otto Ohlendorf
- Joachim Peiper
- Hermann Pister
- Oswald Pohl
- Gustav Adolf Steengracht von Moyland
- Martin Sandberger
- Otto Steinbrinck
- Walter Warlimont
- Martin Gottfried Weiss

== Closure ==
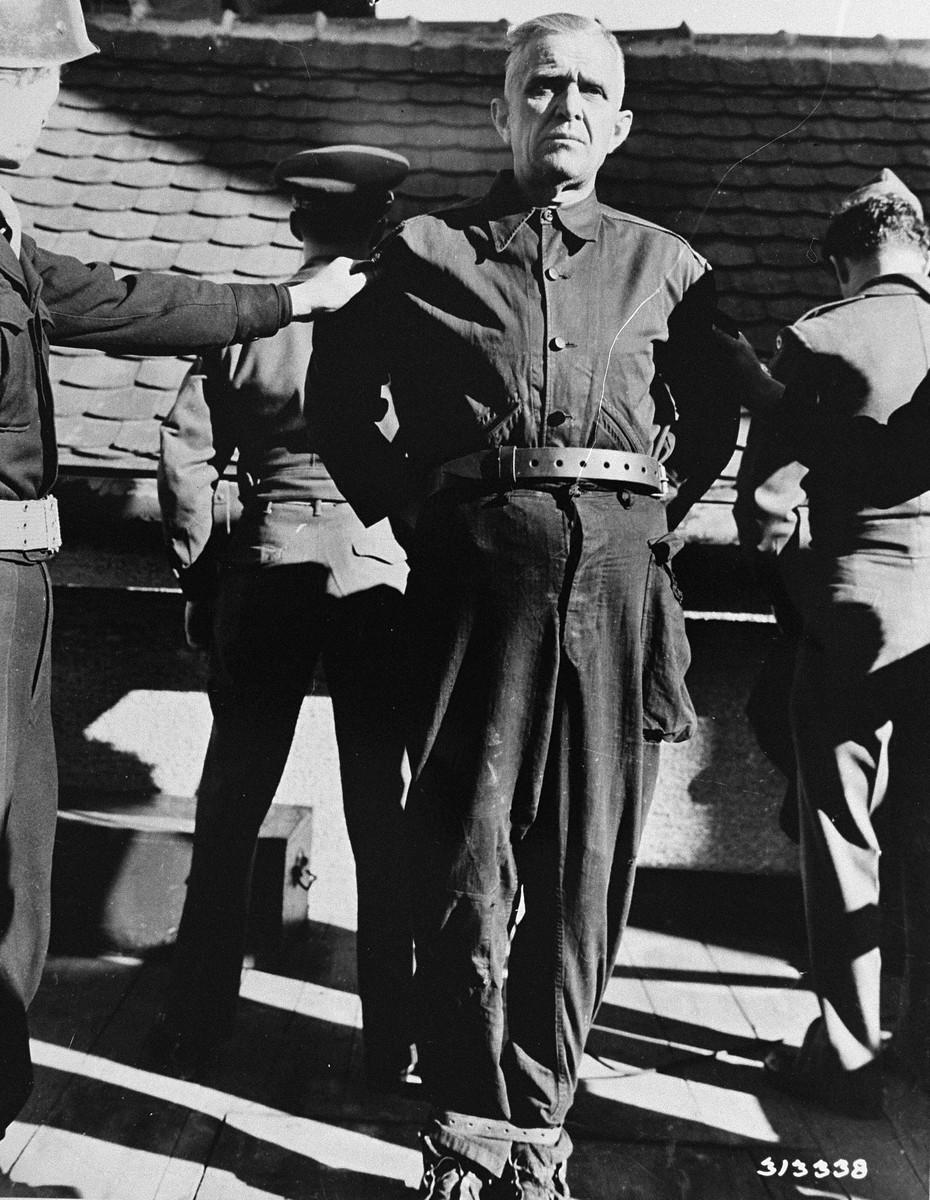
Convicted Nazi war criminal Wladislaus Dopierala before his execution at Landsberg Prison, 1948

By 1948 the Bavarian Ministry of Justice's Association for the Welfare of Prisoners (Vereinigung für die Wohlfahrt von Gefangenen des Bayerischen Staatsministeriums der Justiz) managed the needs of the prisoners held by the American military. With the foundation of the Federal Republic of Germany in May 1949 and its abolition of the death penalty, calls from politicians, the churches, industrialists, and artists resulted in numerous petitions being made to close down War Criminal Prison No. 1. as part of a general effort to bring freedom for all Germans convicted of war crimes. In the last half of 1950 and the first half of 1951, thousands of Germans took part in demonstrations outside Landsberg prison to demand pardons for all the war criminals while the German media coverage was overwhelmingly on the side of the condemned, who were depicted as the innocent victims of American "lynch law". Although the protestors at Landsberg claimed to be good-faith opponents of capital punishment itself, and not motivated by any kind of pro-Nazi or anti-Semitic feelings, their actions belied their words. When a group of about 300 Jewish counter-protestors arrived at Landsberg demanding the execution of war criminals on 7 January 1951, the German protestors demanding amnesty began to chant the Nazi-era slogan "Juden raus! Juden raus!" ("Jews out! Jews out!") and then proceed to beat up the Jewish protestors.

The German historian Norbert Frei observed that almost all of the politicians who demanded freedom for condemned prisoners at Landsberg at various protest rallies outside the prison, such as Richard Jaeger of the CSU, later became prominent advocates of restoring capital punishment, which strongly suggested that what people like Jaeger objected to was not executions in general, but the executions of Nazi war criminals. Another politician who spoke at the protest rallies outside Landsberg prison was Gebhard Seelos of the Bavaria Party, who called the prisoners of Landsberg together with Heligoland—which was being used as target practice by the RAF—to be "beacons of the German Volk in their struggle for justice, peace and the reconciliation of nations". Seelos went on to compare the suffering of the condemned prisoners at Landsberg with that of the six million Jews killed in the Holocaust, and argued that to execute the prisoners on death row at Landsberg would be an act every bit as "inhumane" as the Holocaust. Seelos's speech drew loud applause from the crowd. Frei called Seelos's speech, with its claim that the war criminals facing execution at Landsberg were just as much victims as the Jews that they killed in the Holocaust, a "breathtaking" exercise in moral equivalence.

In early 1951 the Bavarian parliament passed a resolution declaring that all military prisoners at Landsberg, Werl, and Wittlich should be recognized as POWs, making them the financial responsibility of the Federal German government. On 2 January 1951, the West German chancellor, Konrad Adenauer, met the U.S. High Commissioner for Germany, John J. McCloy, to argue that the status of the Landsberg prisoners was not so much a legal question as a political one, and that to execute the Landsberg prisoners would ruin forever any effort at having the Federal Republic play its role in the Cold War. On 31 January 1951 McCloy, under very strong pressure from German public opinion, agreed to review the sentences from the Nuremberg and Dachau trials. Out of 28 prisoners condemned to death, seven death sentences were confirmed. Other convicts, like the industrialist Alfried Krupp von Bohlen und Halbach, were pardoned by McCloy. The sentences for many other war criminals who were not on death row were also reduced.

The five death sentences confirmed by McCloy were the so-called "worst of the worst" at Landsberg; Oswald Pohl, Paul Blobel, Otto Ohlendorf, Werner Braune, Erich Naumann. Two additional death sentences from the Dachau trials were confirmed by General Thomas T. Handy, that of Georg Schallermair (an SS sergeant at Mühldorf, a Dachau sub-camp), and Hans Hermann Schmidt (adjutant of Buchenwald). Neither Adenauer nor German public opinion was satisfied by the decisions of McCloy and Handy, and as a result, throughout the first half of 1951 the Federal Republic continued to lobby McCloy to pardon the seven condemned men while the huge demonstrations for amnesty continued at Landsberg, demanding freedom for the "Landsberg Seven". The final executions were conducted on 7 June 1951.

By the middle of the fifties, these inmates began to be seen not as war criminals, but as political prisoners or prisoners of war. For instance, in 1955, the Landsberg city council asked their mayor "to work for the overdue release of the political prisoners" in the Landsberg prison. Moreover, the FRG government in Bonn decided the convictions of war criminals by military courts were to be regarded as foreign convictions and therefore did not become part of an individual's criminal record. In 1956, the U.S. relinquished most of the prison to West Germany. The inmates still serving time under U.S. convictions were moved to a small section.

In May 1958, the United States Army relinquished full control of Landsberg Prison when the last four prisoners were released from custody. Three of them were former SS officers who had been convicted during the Einsatzgruppen Trials between 1947 and 1948. They had originally been sentenced to death, but were spared by the partial amnesty in 1951.

Management of the facility was transferred to the civilian Bavarian Ministry of Justice.

== Today ==
The prison is now run as a progressive correctional facility and provides training, skills and medical help for the prisoners. There are 36 courses in the central training centre, which provide training for occupations such as bakers, electricians, painters, butchers, carpenters, tailors, shoemakers, heating and ventilation workers and bricklayers. Uli Hoeneß served his sentence for tax fraud in Landsberg Prison.

== See also ==
- Beer Hall Putsch trial (Hitler's trial)
- Doctors' Trial
- Spandau Prison in West Berlin
- Sugamo Prison in Tokyo
