= List of Boeing B-17 Flying Fortress operators =

B-17 Flying Fortress operators
Military	Civil

This list of Boeing B-17 Flying Fortress operators is a list of users who flew and operated the Boeing B-17.

The B-17 was among the first mass-produced four-engined heavy bombers. A total of more than 12,000 were made, making its use as a heavy bomber second only to the B-24 Liberator. Though used at some point in all theatres of World War II, it was most common in the European Theatre, where its lack of range and smaller bombload relative to other heavy bombers was not so detrimental as it was in the Pacific, where most American military airbases were thousands of miles apart.

== Military operators ==
=== Australia ===
Royal Australian Air Force

Proposal to transfer B-17E Flying Fortresses to the RAAF under the A26 designation. None taken on charge.

=== Brazil ===
Brazil acquired 13 B-17s in 1951, according to the Rio Pact of 1947. They were used by the 1º and 2º Esquadrões (1st and 2nd Squadrons) of 6º Grupo de Aviação (6th Aviation Group), based at Recife, for search and rescue and photo-reconnaissance until 1968.

Brazilian Air Force

- 6º Grupo de Aviação
  - 1º Esquadrão
  - 2º Esquadrão

=== Canada ===
Canada received six Flying Fortresses including three B-17Es (designated Fortress Mk.III by the RCAF) and three B-17Fs (designated Fortress Mk.IIIA by the RCAF) which flew 240 trans-Atlantic mail flights from Canada to Canadian troops serving in Europe from 6 December 1943 to 27 December 1946. All six belonged to No. 168 Heavy Transport Squadron RCAF which operated out of RCAF Station Rockcliffe, Ontario. Three Mk.IIIA and one Mk.III were lost in crashes, and the remaining two Mk.IIIs were sold to Argentina in 1948 where they received civilian registrations (LC-RTO and LC-RTP), and hauled beef in 1948, but were parked after 1949, and were finally scrapped in 1964.

Royal Canadian Air Force

- No. 168 Heavy Transport Squadron

=== Colombia ===
- Colombian Air Force

=== Denmark ===
Danish airline DDL bought two B-17s from Sweden in 1945. One of these planes (B-17G-35-BO 42-32076 "Shoo Shoo Shoo Baby") was transferred to the Danish Army Air Corps in 1948 as 67-672. In 1949, it was transferred to the Royal Danish Navy and in 1952 to the Royal Danish Air Force. It has since been displayed at the National Museum of the United States Air Force, but is currently being transferred to the National Air and Space Museum.

=== Dominican Republic ===
Dominican Republic Air Force acquired two B-17Gs in 1947, remaining in use until 1954.

=== France ===
French Air Force used one B-17F as an executive transport for Free-French General Marie Pierre Kœnig.

=== Nazi Germany ===
During World War II, after crash-landing or being forced down, approximately 40 B-17s were repaired and put back into the air by the Luftwaffe. These captured aircraft were codenamed "Dornier Do 200", given German markings and used for clandestine spy and reconnaissance missions by the Luftwaffe - most often used by the Luftwaffe unit Kampfgeschwader 200, hence a likely possibility as a source for the "Do 200" codename.

Luftwaffe

- Kampfgeschwader 200

=== Israel ===
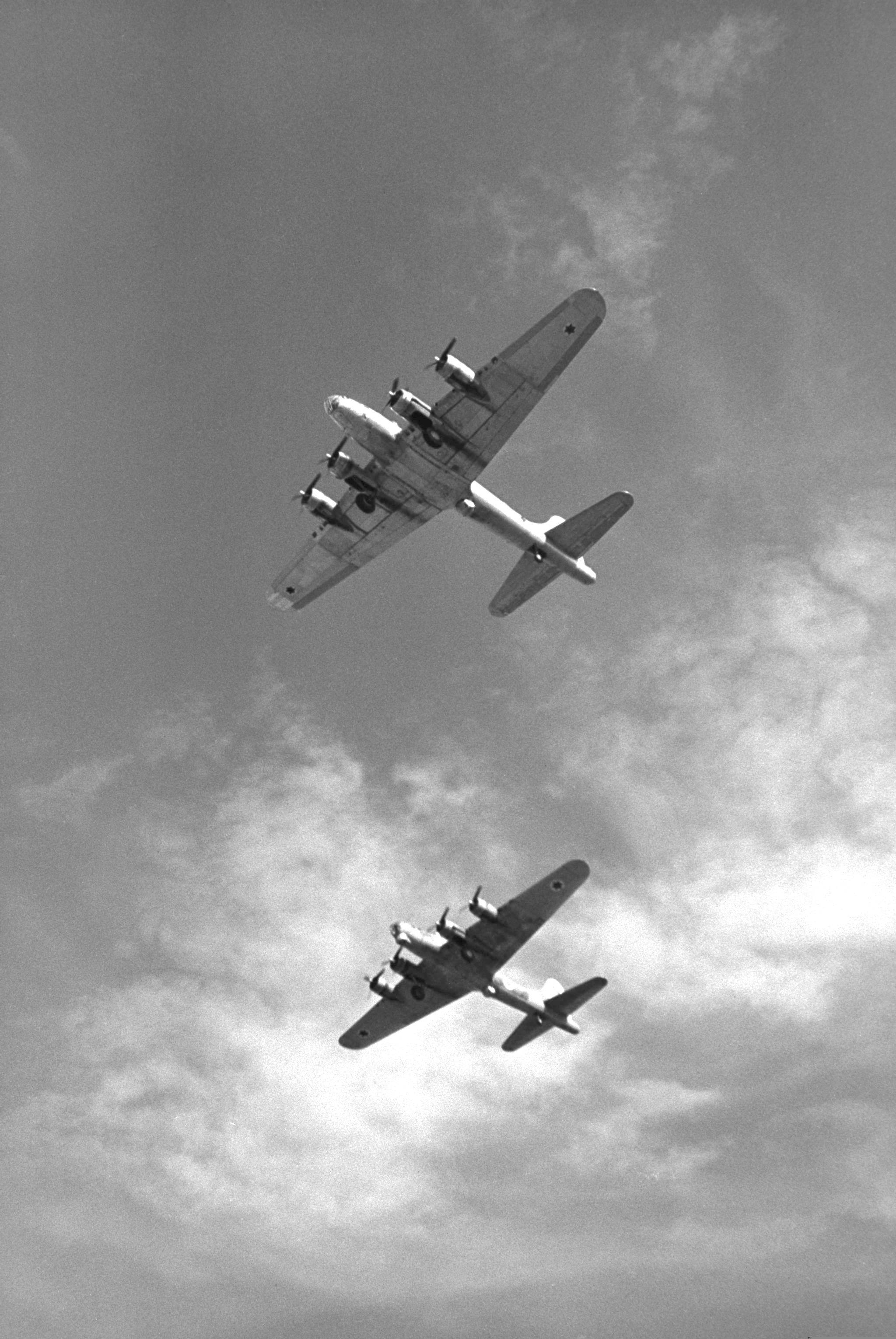
Israeli B-17s in flight, 1953

When Israel achieved statehood in 1948, the Israeli Air Force had to be assembled quickly to defend the new nation from the war it found itself almost immediately embroiled in. Among the first aircraft acquired by the Israeli Air Force were three surplus American B-17s, smuggled via South America and Czechoslovakia to avoid an arms trading ban imposed by the United States. A fourth plane was abandoned due to malfunctions and confiscated by American officials. On their delivery flight from Europe, in retaliation for Egyptian bombing raids on Tel Aviv, the aircraft were ordered to bomb King Farouk's Royal Palace in Cairo before continuing to Israel. They performed the mission (despite some of the crew fainting due to defective oxygen equipment), but caused little damage. The B-17s were generally unsuitable for the needs of the Israeli Air Force, and the nature of the conflict in which long-range bombing raids on large area targets were relatively unimportant—although the psychological impact of the raids was not lost on the enemy. The aircraft were mainly used in the 1948 Arab–Israeli War, flown by 69 Squadron; they were withdrawn in 1958 after seeing minor action in the 1956 Suez Crisis.

Israeli Air Force

- 69 Squadron IAF

=== Japan ===
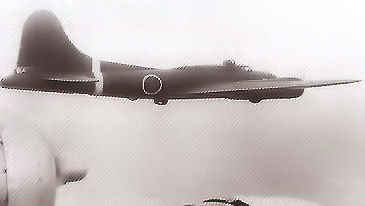
41-2471, a Boeing B-17E Flying Fortress that was captured and subsequently flown by the IJAAF's Air Technical Research Institute

Three B-17s (one early "D" model and two "E" models) were captured with their top secret Norden bombsights and rebuilt from wrecks to flying status in the Philippines and Netherlands East Indies. The three aircraft were thoroughly flight tested and evaluated at Tachikawa, Japan by the IJAAF Koku Gijutsu Kenkyujo (Air Technical Research Institute). They were also used to develop effective fighter aircraft battle tactics against the Flying Fortress.

=== Nicaragua ===
The B-17s were used during the occupation of Nicaragua against the Sandinista National Liberation Front (Frente Sandinista de Liberación Nacional)

=== Peru ===
Peruvian Air Force

=== Portugal ===
The Portuguese Air Force (Força Aérea Portuguesa) operated five SB-17Gs as search-and-rescue planes from 1947 to 1960.

=== Soviet Union ===
Late in World War II, RAF and USAAF bombers that had been damaged in raids over the Reich would put down in Soviet-controlled territory rather than try to make it back to Western bases, and in April 1945 the Soviet Air Forces (VVS) issued a directive to its units in the field to report the location of any aircraft of its Western Allies that were in Soviet hands; among the aircraft salvaged were a total of 73 B-17s. The Fortresses that were in the best condition were returned to the USAAF, but a number were retained as interim heavy bombers. Although Russian aircrews and maintenance crews had no experience with such aircraft, the Soviets proved ingenious at keeping them flying, and in fact were delighted with the B-17's handling, comparing it to a "swallow" and the nimble Polikarpov Po-2 biplane trainer. Soviet officials tended to order the "filthy pictures" applied to the aircraft removed or painted out. The B-17s remained in service until 1948, when the Tupolev Tu-4 began to arrive at operational squadrons.

=== Republic of China ===
Beginning in 1952, Taiwan (under the guise of the CIA's Civil Air Transport (CAT) and Technical Research Group (TRG) organizations, operated a number of "enhanced" B-17s (with as many as 14 crewmembers at a time) on surveillance and related flights of mainland China. These were crewed by Chinese crews, largely and wore Nationalist Chinese markings. At least one B-17 was shot down by a MiG-15 over mainland China.

=== Turkey ===
Turkish Air Force

=== United Kingdom ===
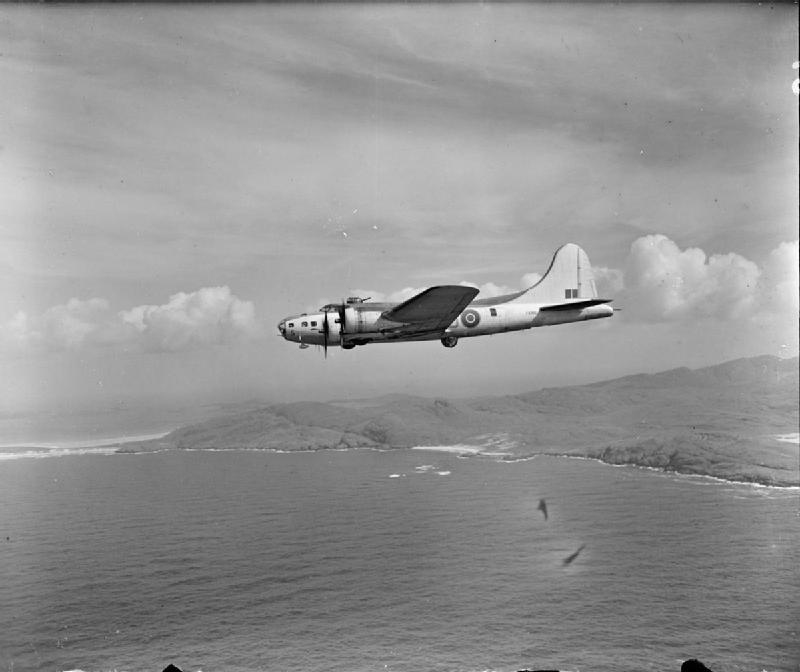
Fortress Mark IIA maritime patrol aircraft.

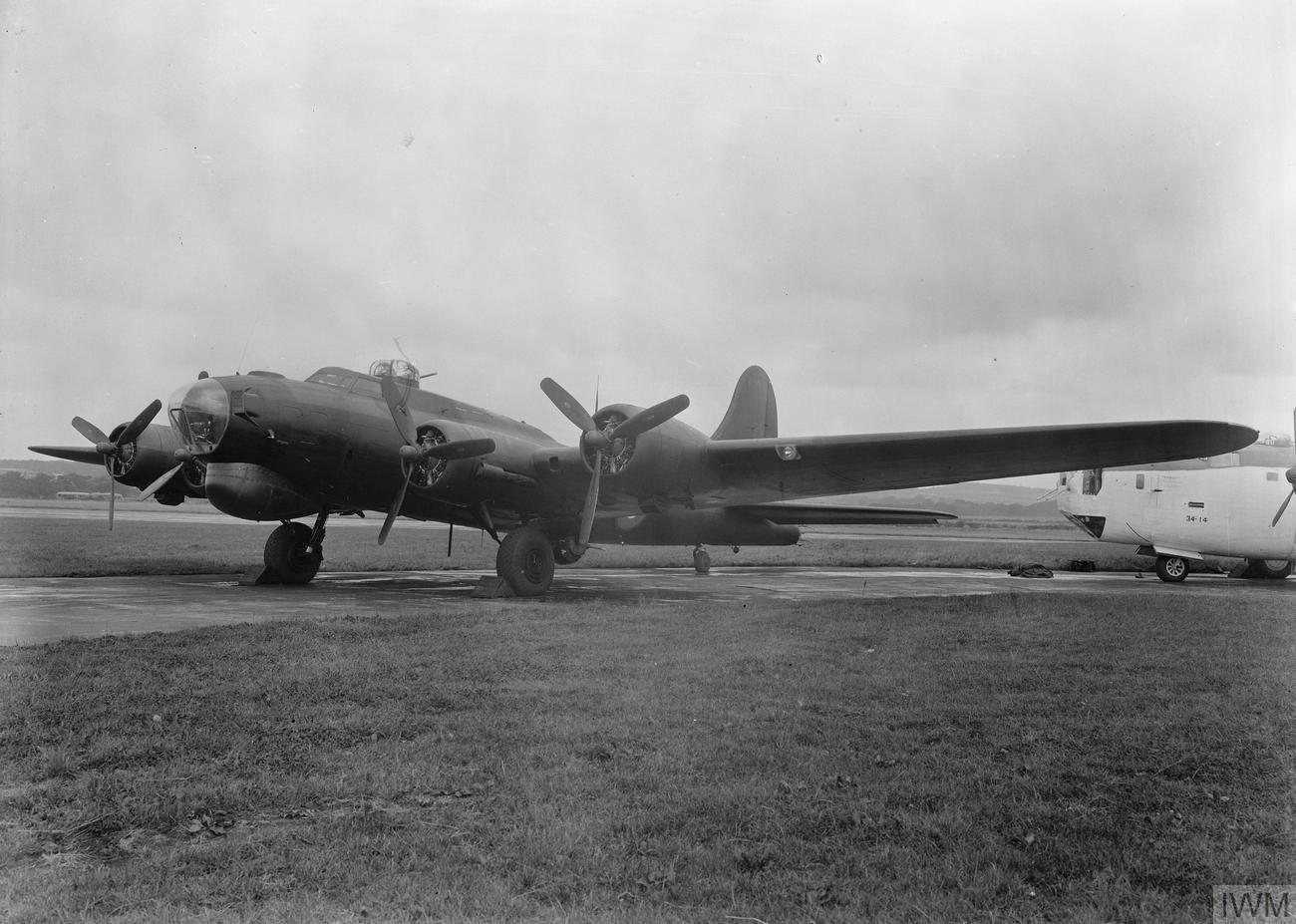
Fortress Mk.III (SD) electronic warfare aircraft.

The Royal Air Force received 20 B-17Cs in early 1940 from the USAAC, giving them the name Fortress I while in service. By September, after the RAF had lost eight B-17Cs in combat or to various accidents, RAF Bomber Command abandoned daylight bombing, due to the bomber's uneven high altitude performance. The RAF transferred its remaining Fortress I aircraft to RAF Coastal Command for use as very long range patrol aircraft. These were later augmented in August 1942 by 19 Fortress Mk II and 45 Fortress Mk IIA (B-17F and B-17E, respectively). From 1944 the Fortress IIs and IIIs were being used by the specialist electronic countermeasures squadrons of No. 100 Group RAF

Royal Air Force

- No. 59 Squadron RAF - Fortress IIA from April 1943 to December 1944, based at RAF Thorney Island and RAF Chivenor.
- No. 90 Squadron RAF - Fortress I from 7 May 1941 to February 1942, based at RAF Watton, RAF West Raynham and RAF Polebrook.
- No. 206 Squadron RAF - Fortress II from July 1942 to March 1944, based at RAF Benbecula, RAF Lagens.
- No. 214 Squadron RAF - Fortress II from January 1944 to July 1945 and Fortress III from November 1944 to July 1945, based at RAF Sculthorpe and RAF Oulton.
- No. 220 Squadron RAF - Fortress I from December 1941 to August 1942, Fortress II from July 1942 to December 1944 and Fortress III from July 1944 to April 1945. Based at RAF Wick, RAF Nutts Corner, RAF Ballykelly, RAF Aldergrove, RAF Benbecula, RAF Lagens.
- No. 223 Squadron RAF - Fortress II and III from April 1945 to July 1945 at RAF Oulton.
- No. 251 Squadron RAF - Fortress II from March 1945 to October 1945 at RAF Reykjavik.
- No. 517 Squadron RAF - Operated USAAF B-17Fs from September to November 1943 at RAF St Eval
- No. 519 Squadron RAF - Fortress II from October 1944 to September 1945 at RAF Wick
- No. 521 Squadron RAF - Fortress II from December 1944 to February 1946, Fortress III from December 1945 to February 1946 at RAF Docking.

=== United States ===
See B-17 Flying Fortress units of the United States Army Air Forces;

The United States Army Air Corps/United States Army Air Forces USAAC/USAAF was the primary operator of all versions of the Boeing B-17 Flying Fortress. Most units operating B-17s were based in the European Theatre of World War II, but the aircraft was used at some point in all theatres of the Second World War.

== Civil operators ==
=== Argentina ===
Two ex-RCAF/USAAF B-17E were sold in 1948 and registered as LV-RTO and LV-RTP Both were delivered to Carlos Pérez de Villa at Bernardino Rivadavia Airport (Morón, Buenos Aires) in 1948. Scrapped in 1964.

=== Bolivia ===
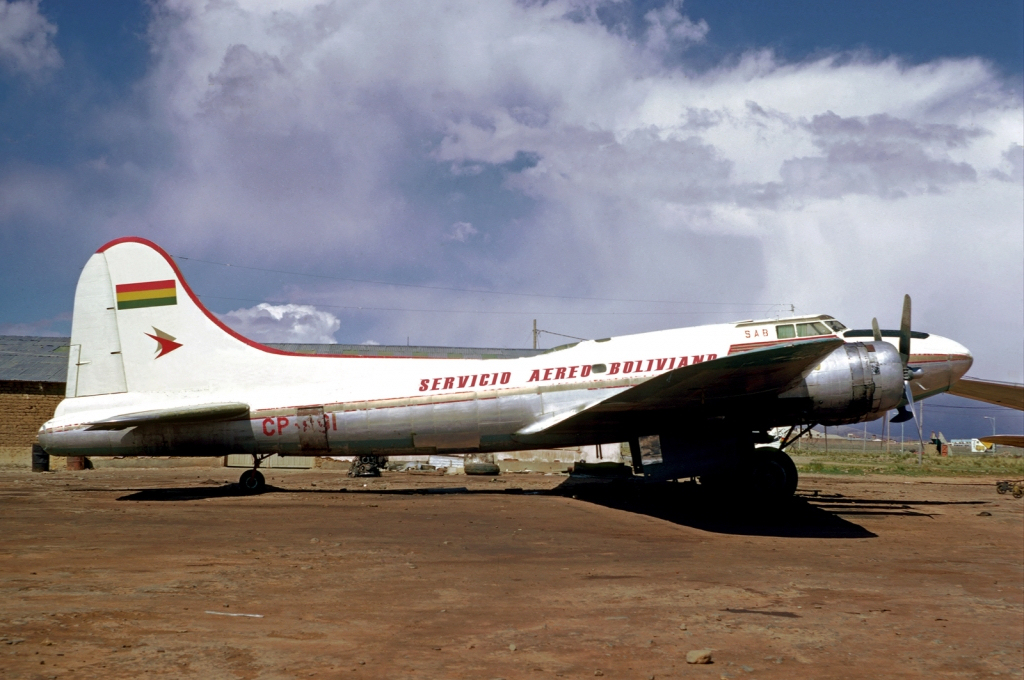
Servicios Aéreos Bolivianos Boeing B-17 Flying Fortress 1972.

Used 25 B-17s in civil aviation under different operators.

=== Canada ===
Canadian B-17 flown by Kenting Aviation in the 60's for level photo in many parts of the world

=== Denmark ===
Danish airline DDL bought two B-17s from Sweden in 1945. One of these planes was transferred to the Danish Army Air Corps in 1948.

=== France ===
14 B-17 were used between 1946 and 1975 by the French IGN (Institut Géographique National) for aerial photography. One of them is still flying today after restoration as Pink Lady in 2010. It is now on static display à La Ferté-Alais.

=== Iran ===
One of Trans World Airlines B-17G was given to the Shah of Iran in 1947.

=== Mexico ===
The Mexican government revived several B-17Gs from the United States for internal policing and anti-mafia operations.

=== South Africa ===
One B-17G Flying Fortress "44-85718" was registered in South Africa while in service with the Institut Géographique National between 1965 - 1966 performing geographical survey operations. It was registered as ZS-EEC in February 1965 and operated from Pretoria until its return to Creil, France in August 1966. It is currently flying in the United States as Thunderbird with the Lone Star Flight Museum in Galveston, Texas.

Another B-17G "44-8846" was to be registered as ZS-DXM but this was only reserved and not allocated to the aircraft. It is still flying today after restoration as Pink Lady in 2010. It is now on static display à La Ferté-Alais

=== Sweden ===
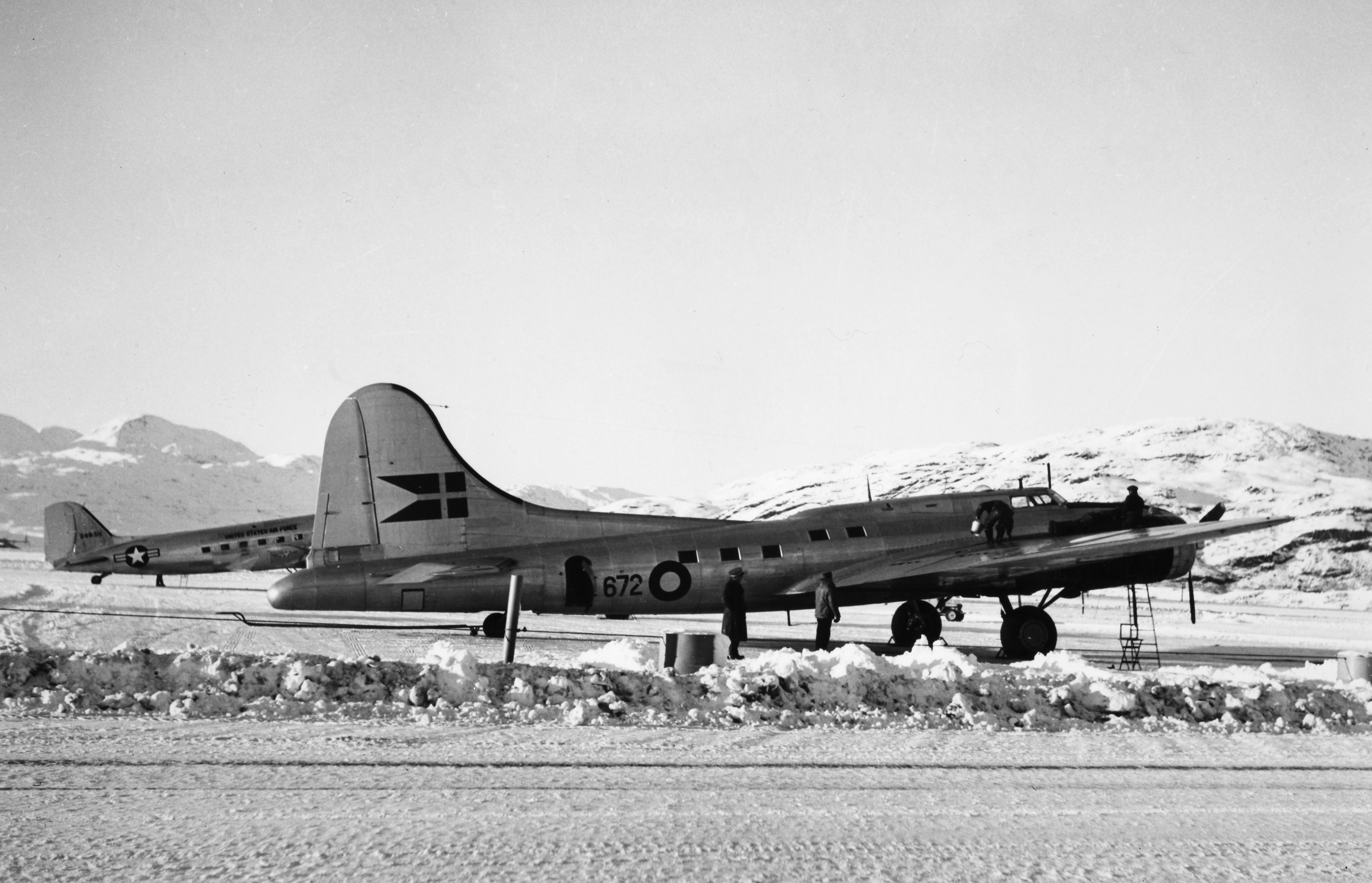
Scandinavian Airlines Boeing B-17.

In an exchange with about 300 interned American crew members, nine intact B-17 were given away for free to the Swedish airline SILA (Svensk Interkontinental Lufttrafik AB) to be operated by ABA (which later became part of Scandinavian Airlines). Seven of these, three B-17F and four B-17G, were converted into 14-seat airliners by Saab. By 1946 all were retired and replaced by the Douglas DC-4. Today, one of them is on static display at National Museum of the United States Air Force in Dayton, Ohio, restored back to combat figuration.

=== United Kingdom ===
Two B-17s have been civil registered in the United Kingdom

- G-BEDF Sally B is a B-17G, a former French IGN survey aircraft that operates as a display and memorial aircraft since 1974, originally registered in the United States it became a British civil aircraft in 1984, aircraft is operational with B-17 Preservation Limited from the Imperial War Museum airfield at Duxford as Sally B.
- G-FORT was a B-17G, a former French IGN survey aircraft that was based in the United Kingdom from 1984 to 1987 with two private owners, it was sold in the United States. It was flown by the Lone Star Flight Museum as Thunderbird. Now transferred to the Mid America Flight Museum in Mount Pleasant, Texas, it is currently undergoing maintenance at the Erickson Aircraft Collection in Madras, Oregon.

=== United States ===
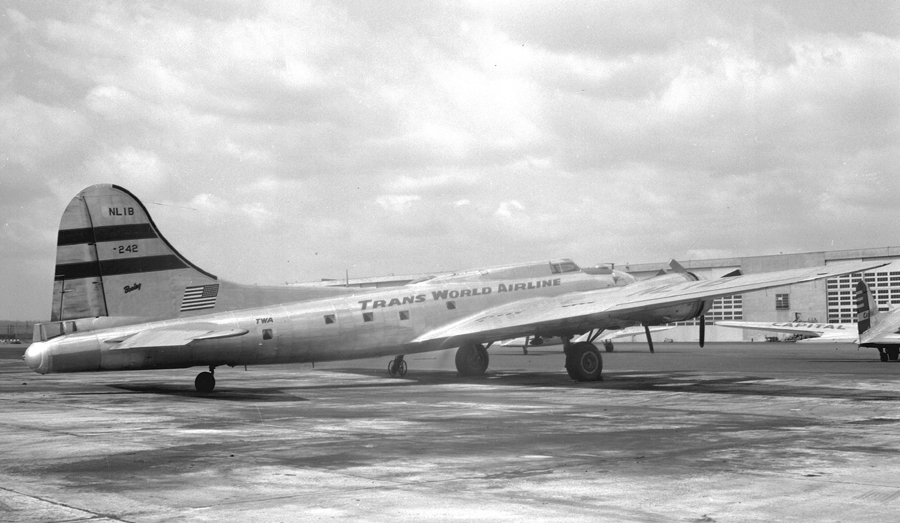
Trans World Airlines Boeing B-17 Flying Fortress.

- Following the war, Trans World Airlines purchased a surplus B-17G and used it to survey and set up routes in the Middle-East. In 1947, it was given to the Shah of Iran.
- Aero Union - began operation of the B-17 as a fire fighting aircraft in 1961.

== See also ==
- B-17 Flying Fortress survivors

== Sources ==
- Arakaki, Leatrice R. and John R. Kuborn. 7 December 1941: The Air Force Story. Hickam Air Force Base, Hawaii: Pacific Air Forces, Office of History, 1991. ISBN 0-912799-73-0.
- Birdsall, Steve. The B-17 Flying Fortress. Dallas, Texas: Morgan Aviation Books, 1965.
- Bowers, Peter M. Boeing Aircraft Since 1916. Annapolis, Maryland: Naval Institute Press, 1989. ISBN 0-370-00016-1.
- Bowers, Peter M. Fortress In The Sky, Granada Hills, California: Sentry Books, 1976. ISBN 0-913194-04-2.
- Bowman, Martin W. Castles in the Air: The Story of the B-17 Flying Fortress Crews of the U.S. 8th Air Force. Dulles, Virginia: Potomac Books, 2000. ISBN 1-57488-320-8.
- Caidin, Martin. Black Thursday. New York: E.P. Dutton & Company, 1960. ISBN 0-553-26729-9.
- Caldwell, Donald and Richard Muller. The Luftwaffe over Germany: Defense of the Reich. London: Greenhill Books Publications, 2007. ISBN 978-1-85367-712-0.
- Carey, Brian Todd. "Operation Pointblank: Evolution of Allied Air Doctrine During World War II." World War II, November 1998. Retrieved: 15 January 2007.
- David, Donald. "Boeing Model 299 (B-17 Flying Fortress)." The Encyclopedia of World Aircraft. Etobicoke, Ontario, Canada: Prospero Books, 1997. ISBN 1-85605-375-X.
- Davis, Larry. B-17 in Action. Carrollton, Texas: Squadron/Signal Publications, 1984. ISBN 0-89747-152-0.
- Freeman, Roger A. B-17 Fortress at War. New York: Charles Scribner's Sons, 1977. ISBN 0-684-14872-2.
- Frisbee, John L. (October 1990). "Valor: Courage and Conviction". Air & Space Forces Magazine. Vol. 73, no. 10. Archived from the original on 23 January 2026.
- Hess, William N. B-17 Flying Fortress: Combat and Development History of the Flying Fortress. St. Paul, Minnesota: Motorbook International, 1994. ISBN 0-87938-881-1.
- Hess, William N. B-17 Flying Fortress Units of the MTO. Botley, Oxford, UK: Osprey Publishing Limited, 2003. ISBN 1-84176-580-5.
- Hess, William N. Big Bombers of WWII. Ann Arbor, Michigan: Lowe & B. Hould, 1998. ISBN 0-681-07570-8.
- Hess, William N. and Jim Winchester. ""Boeing B-17 Flying Fortress:Queen of the Skies". Wings Of Fame. Volume 6. London:Aerospace Publishing, 1997. ISBN 1-874023-93-X. ISSN 1361-2034. pp. 38–103.
- Hoffman, Wally and Rouyer, Philipppe. "La guerre à 30 000 pieds". Louviers : Ysec Editions, 2008. ISBN 978-2-84673-109-6. [Available only in French]
- Jablonski, Edward. Flying Fortress. New York: Doubleday, 1965. ISBN 0-385-03855-0.
- Johnsen, Frederick A. Boeing B-17 Flying Fortress. Stillwater, Minnesota: Voyageur Press, 2001. ISBN 1-58007-052-3.
- Johnsen, Frederick A. (October 2006). "The Making of an Iconic Bomber" (PDF). Air & Space Forces Magazine. Vol. 89, no. 10. Archived (PDF) from the original on 7 August 2024.
- Lloyd, Alwyn T. B-17 Flying Fortress in Detail and Scale vol. 11: Derivatives, part 2. Fallbrook, California: Aero Publishers, 1983. ISBN 0-8168-5021-6.
- Lloyd, Alwyn T. B-17 Flying Fortress in Detail and Scale vol. 20: More derivatives, part 3. Blue Ridge Summit, Pennsylvania: Tab Books, 1986. ISBN 0-8168-5029-1.
- Lloyd, Alwyn T. and Terry D. Moore. B-17 Flying Fortress in Detail and Scale vol. 1: Production Versions, part 1. Fallbrook, California: Aero Publishers, 1981. ISBN 0-8168-5012-7.
- O'Leary, Michael. Boeing B-17 Flying Fortress (Osprey Production Line to Frontline 2). Botley, Oxford, UK: Osprey Publishing, 1999. ISBN 1-85532-814-3.
- Salecker, Gene Eric. Fortress Against The Sun – The B-17 Flying Fortress in the Pacific. Conshohocken, Pennsylvania: Combined Publishing, 2001. ISBN 1-58097-049-4.
- Thompson, Scott A. Final Cut: The Post War B-17 Flying Fortress, The Survivors: Revised and Updated Edition. Highland County, Ohio: Pictorial Histories Publishing Company, 2000. ISBN 1-57510-077-0.
- Willmott, H.P. B-17 Flying Fortress. London: Bison Books, 1980. ISBN 0-85368-444-8.
- Wisker Thomas J. "Talkback". Air Enthusiast, No. 10, July–September 1979, p. 79. ISSN 0143-5450
- Yenne, Bill. B-17 at War. St Paul, Minnesota: Zenith Imprint, 2006. ISBN 0-7603-2522-7.
