= Bombing of Nordhausen in World War II =

Nordhausen World War II bombings
- Part of Strategic bombing campaign in Europe
Location	Nordhausen (district), Nazi Germany

Belligerents
(United States) Eighth Air Force (United Kingdom) RAF Bomber Command	(Nazi Germany) Luftwaffe

Commanders and leaders
Carl Spaatz Arthur Harris	

The Allies bombed Nordhausen during World War II in a series of strategic attacks against targets in the Nordhausen district and city.

Targets around Nordhausen included Gustloff factory, Mittelwerk and Nordhausen airfield

== Raids and related activities ==
Date	Target	Notes
July 7, 1944		Of 453 B-17s, 114 hit Leipzig/Taucha, 79 hit Leipzig/Mockau, 35 hit Leipzig/Heiterblick and 15 hit Leipzig/Abtnaundorf oil plants, 46 hit Leipzig bearing industry, 35 hit Kolleda Airfield, 19 hit Leipzig Station and seven hit Nordhausen.
August 24, 1944	airfield & Gustloff factory	11 B-17s bombed Nordhausen airfield (the 511th Bombardment Squadron bombed Buchenwald/Nordhausen). In 1943, a Gustloff factory (in addition to one at Weimar) had been built at Buchenwald, and an August 1944 bombing destroyed the Buchenwald factory, killing many forced laborers. Salvaged equipment was moved to an underground salt mine in Billroda to resume production. One aircraft hit by wingman's gunfire crashed 8 miles North of Nordhausen. The 336th Fighter Squadron strafed the airfield.
August 24, 1944	airfield	Mission 669: 24 B-17s bombed.
December 12, 1944		Mission 748: 10 B-17s bombed the secondary target of Nordhausen.
February 1945 (late)	Mittelwerk	The Combined Chiefs of Staff discussed a proposed Allied attack on the Nordhausen plant with a highly flammable petroleum-soap mixtureHLW:188 which, having been used in the Pacific theatre, filled the tiniest crevices and burned with intense heat. Instead, Nordhausen was subsequently lightly attacked with conventional bombers, but the vulnerable convict barracks (Camp ‘Dora’) were untouched.
February 22, 1945	marshalling yards	Mission 841: 41 B-24s bombed the marshalling yards and targets of opportunity.
April 3 & 4, 1945		Three-quarters of the town of Nordhausen was destroyed and ~8,800 people died, including 1500 sick prisoners at the Boelcke Kaserne barracks.
April 6, 1945		A Canadian armoured column cut the final supply line of V-2 rockets from the assembly plants near Zutphen.
April 10, 1945	Allied capture	"The U. S. First Army reached Nordhausen."
April 14 to 30, 1945	airfield	The Allies used the Nordhausen airfield.
