= The Pink Lady (aircraft) =

American heavy bomber from World War II

Boeing B-17G Flying Fortress The Pink Lady
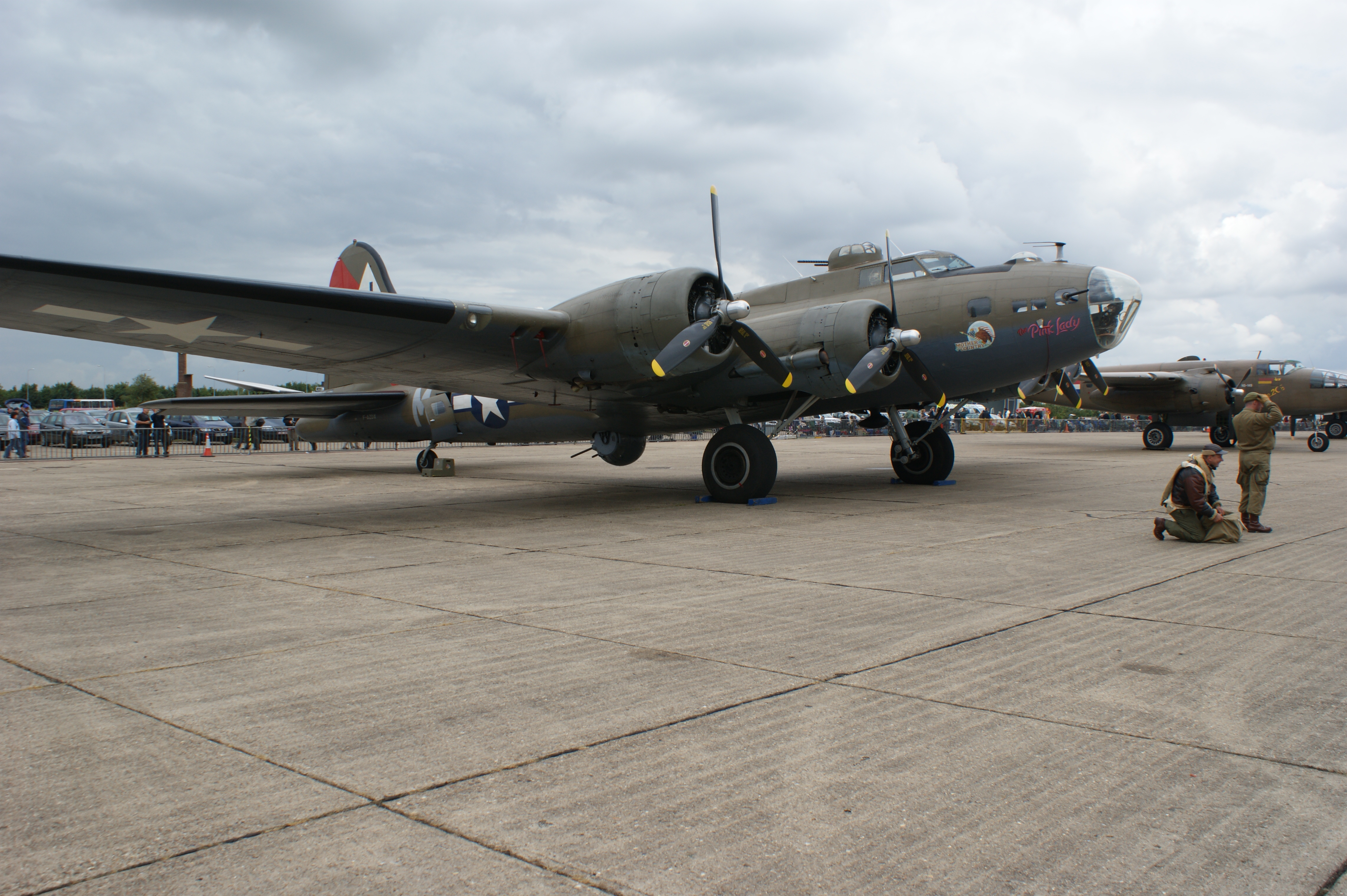
- The aircraft at Duxford, England, in 2008

General information
- Type: Boeing B-17G-85-VE Flying Fortress
- Manufacturer: Lockheed-Vega
- Construction number: 8246 (-VE)
- Registration: F-AZDX (France)
- Serial: 44-8846

History
- Manufactured: 1944
- Preserved at: Forteresse toujours volante, Cerny, Essonne, France

The Pink Lady is the nickname of a B-17G Flying Fortress bomber, serial number 44-8846, which flew several missions for the United States Army Air Forces (USAAF) over Nazi Germany near the end of World War II. The plane is now on static display in Cerny, Essonne, France.

== History ==
=== Military use ===
Rolled out of the Lockheed-Vega production facility in Burbank, California in December 1944, The Pink Lady was then only known as a B-17G-85-VE Fortress, serial number 44-8846. The plane was outfitted with AN/APS-15 radar in place of a standard ball turret.

On March 1, 1945, 44-8846 was flown to RAF Polebrook, England, and assigned to the 511th Bombardment Squadron, 351st Bombardment Group. Since she entered active service so close to the end of the war, 44-8846 only flew six missions over Germany, the last one on April 20, 1945, when the 351st ended combat operations. She was transferred to the 365th Bombardment Squadron, 305th Bombardment Group, based at RAF Chelveston, England, when the rest of the 351st returned to the United States.

=== Post-military use ===
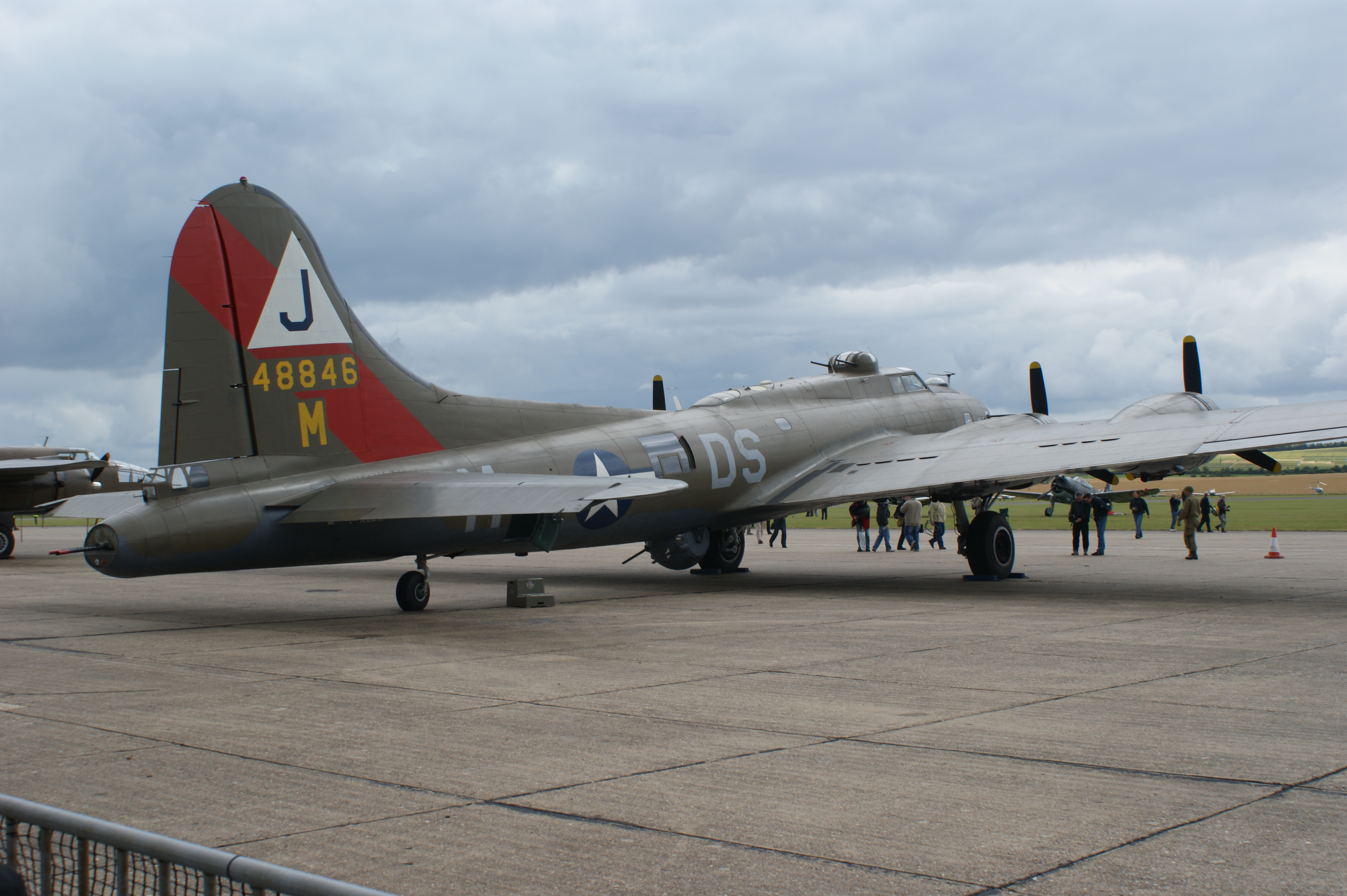
Rear-right view of the plane in 2008

She was featured as the fictional B-17F aircraft Mother and Country in the 1990 film Memphis Belle, she was painted on one side to resemble the older B-17F. She is credited in the 2012 film Red Tails. The Pink Lady was based at Paris–Orly Airport, France, just to the south of Paris, until its hangar was listed for demolition. In October 2006, she was stored for winter 2006–2007 in a hangar in Saint Yan, (Saône et Loire), France. Afterwards, she was based at Melun Villaroche (LFPM), south-east of Paris, where some Dassault (Mirage, Mystère or Balzac) aircraft made their first flights. She has made some appearances, like at Melun in 2008 or the Paris Air Show and OTT Hahnweide in 2009. Her last flight from Melun Villaroche (her last base before retirement) was to Cerny-La Ferté Alais (LFFQ) (the airfield of Amicale Jean-Baptiste Salis) in March 2010.

Until retirement early in 2010, it was the only flying survivor to have seen action in Europe during World War II. As of 29 October 2011, she is inside a new hangar where she will wait some years before flying again. In 2012, this aircraft was classed as Monument historique.

== Painting schemes and registration numbers ==
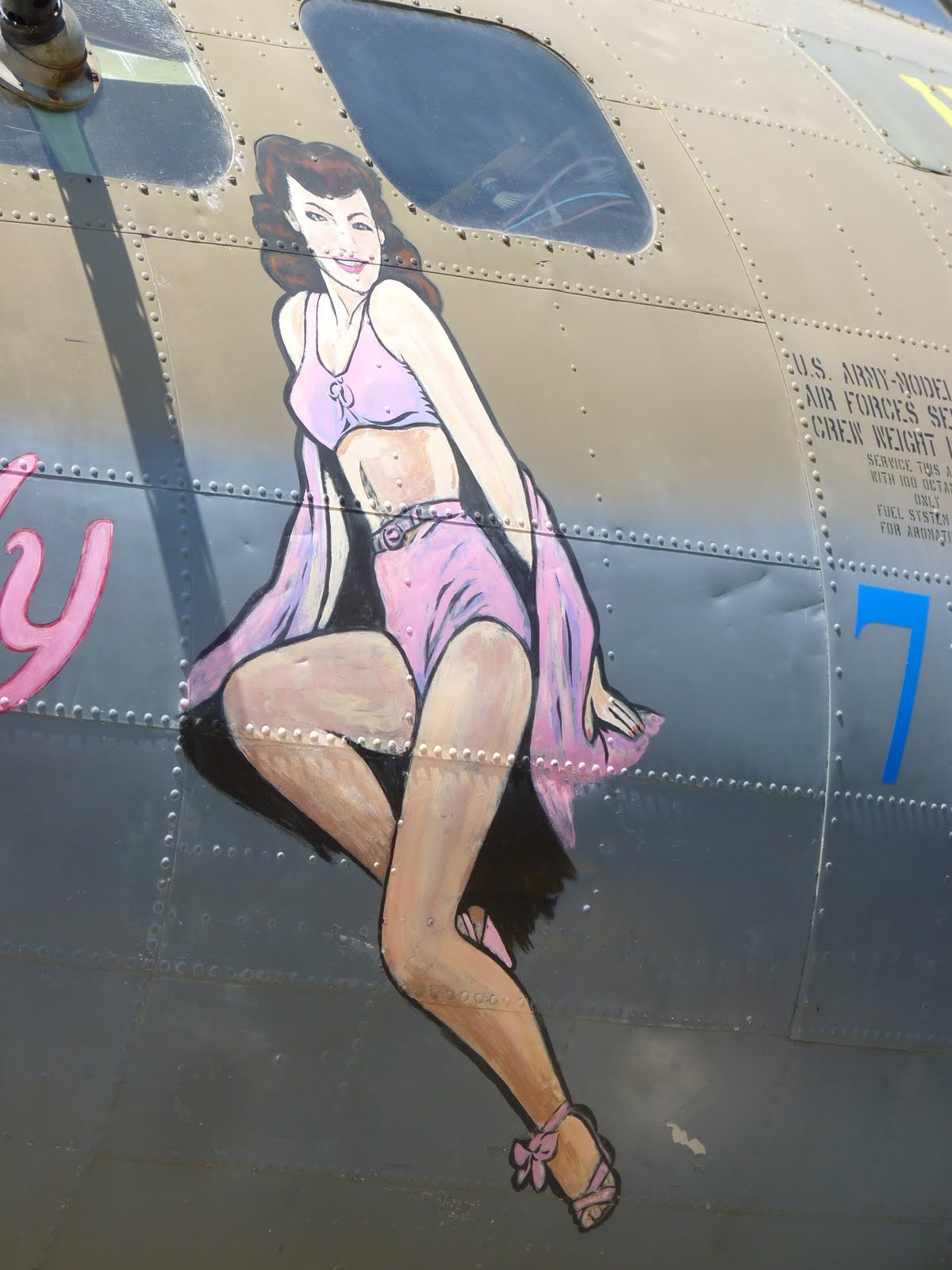
The Pink Lady nose art in 2010

Below is a non-exhaustive chronological list of The Pink Lady's painting schemes and registration numbers from 1945 to 2006:

Entire Aircraft: Unpainted Aluminum

1945: s/n 48846 on tail

1945, March: white J in black Triangle 48846 M on tail (with red diagonal stripe), DS : M on fuselage, M on chin turret

▲J designates 351st Bombardment Group
Squadron code DS designates 511th Bombardment Squadron

1945, May: white G in black Triangle 48846 XK: M on fuselage

▲G designates 305th Bombardment Group
Squadron code XK designates 365th Bombardment Squadron

1954: Institut Geographique National logo on tail, F-BGSP on fuselage

1965: IGN, registered as ZS-DXM

1979: WFU

1985: 48846 on tail, F-AZDX on fuselage, "Lucky Lady" artwork added to nose for air-show tour

Entire Aircraft: Olive Drab upper surfaces, light gray lower surfaces

1989: Officially registered as F-AZDX, was painted for the movie Memphis Belle as:

- Left side: 28703 (25703?) on tail, DF-S on fuselage, "Mother and Country" on nose
- Right side: 122960 on tail, G-DF on fuselage, "The Pink Lady" artwork on nose

1993: large text below pilot and co-pilot side windows:

B 17
FAURE
EVER

- On right-hand side, 5 yellow bombs painted after the word "FAURE", under which there were 2 swastikas

1998: 22955 on tail, F-AZDX on fuselage, "Mother and Country" artwork on nose

2002: Triangle-J 48846 M on tail (with red stripe as per 351st Bomb Group markings), M-DS on fuselage (chin turret removed)

- Left side: "The Pink Lady" artwork, and 846 on nose
  - 6 yellow bombs painted below pilot's side window
  - Blue number "7"
  - TEXT (black stencil):
    - U.S. ARMY-MODEL B-17G-85-VE
    - AIR FORCES SERIAL NO. 44-8846
    - CREW WEIGHT 1200 LBS
    - (+ 5 lines of smaller text)
- Right side: "Mother and Country", and "The Pink Lady" artwork on nose
- Top left wing: Star
- Right Bottom wing: Star

The current paint job does not have "The Pink Lady" artwork on right nose, but is otherwise like its 2002 configuration.

This aircraft was present at "The Flying Legends" (Duxford, UK) air display on 12–13 July 2008. The "Mother and Country", and "The Pink Lady" artwork was present on the right side nose area.
