= La Ferté-Alais Air Show =

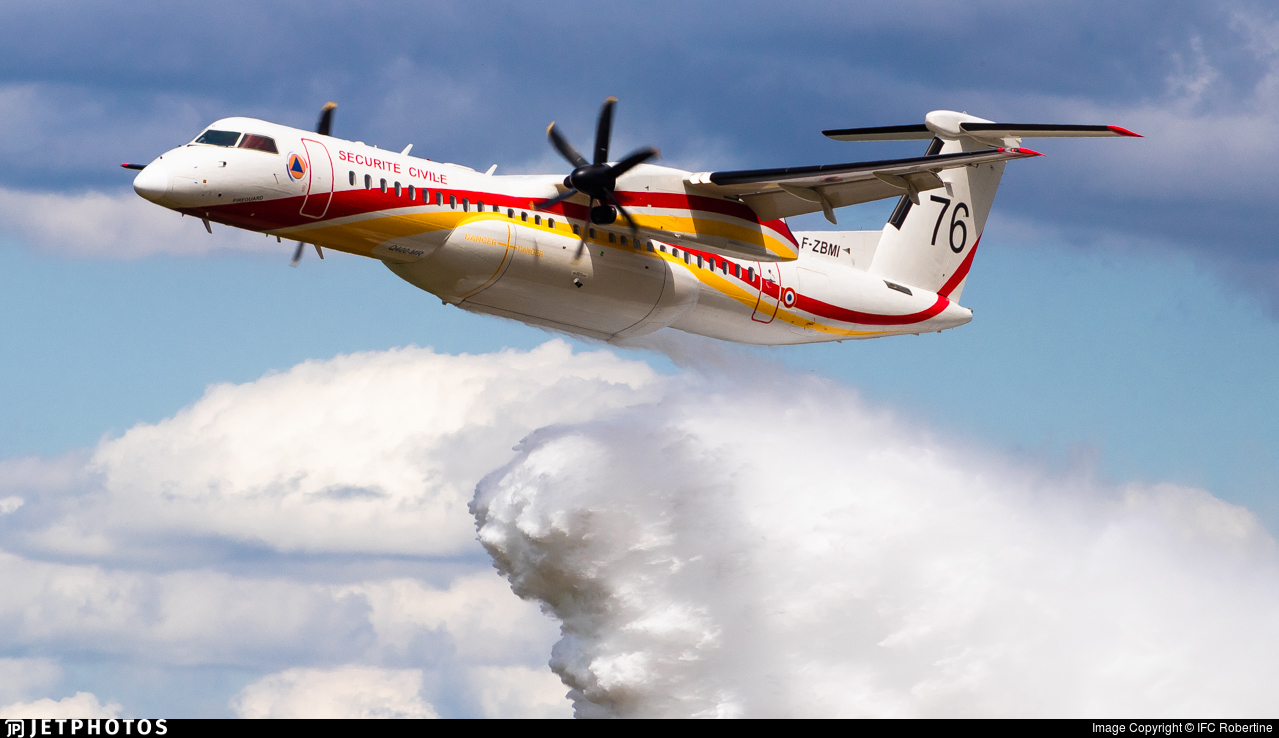
- A Sécurité Civile demonstration at the 2022 airshow.
- Status: Active
- Genre: Air show
- Frequency: Yearly
- Venue: Cerny Airfield
- Location: La Ferté-Alais
- Coordinates: 48°29′50″N 2°20′13″E
- Country: France
- Website: https://letempsdeshelices.fr/

The La Ferté-Alais Air Show is an annual meeting of aviation enthusiasts, flight organizations, companies, and pilots in the village of La Ferté-Alais, France.

It takes place during Pentecost at the Cerny airfield (ICAO: LFFQ), which is owned and operated by the "Amicale Jean-Baptiste Salis" (AJBS). The airfield is also the site of the Musée Volant Salis, hosting 70 aircraft from the past century.

In preparation for the airshow, dozens of vintage aircraft are come from Europe and the US for display and flight demonstrations.

The show regularly starts with a flight demonstration of vintage aircraft such as the Blériot XI and Stearman. It is then usually followed with an aerobatic and pyrotechnic display of warbirds such as the T-6 texan and T-28 Trojan. The French Air and Space Force (Armée de l'Air) then often presents some of the aircraft in their fleet, such as the Rafale, Atlantique and Mirage aircraft. The French Sécurite Civile sometimes comes to demonstrate their technology such as water bombers and surveillance helicopters. This is followed by personal presentations of special individual aircraft performing aerobatics and flight demonstrations. The airshow usually ends with demonstrations by the Patrouille de France and Rafale Solo Display.

On rare occasions, Air France performs a flyby with their flagship aircraft, such as the Concorde in 1988 or the Boeing 777 in 2019.

== Media Presence ==
The B-17 Flying Fortress The Pink Lady used in the motion picture Memphis Belle is a permanent project of the AJBS group.
