= No. 168 Squadron RCAF =

168 Heavy Transport Squadron
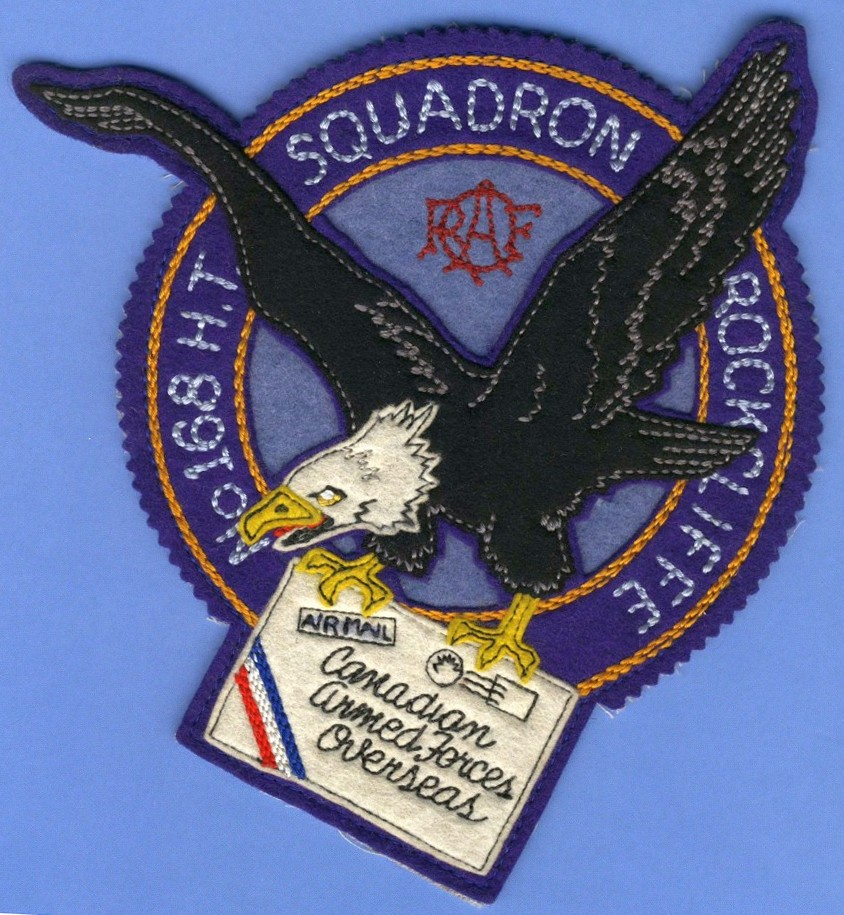
- Unofficial unit badge
- Active: 18 October 1943 – 21 April 1946
- Country: Canada
- Branch: Royal Canadian Air Force
- Role: Transport/Mail delivery
- Part of: No. 9 Transport Group
- Based at: RCAF Station Rockcliffe

Commanders
- Oct '43-Mar '44: W/C R.B. Middleton
- Mar '44-Sept '45: W/C L.G.D. Fraser
- Sept '45-Feb '46: W/C R.W. Goodwin
- Feb '46-Apr '46: W/C J.R. Fizzle

Aircraft flown
- Transport: Boeing Fortress, Consolidated Liberator, Douglas Dakota, Lockheed Lodestar

No. 168 Squadron RCAF was a heavy transport (H.T.) squadron of the Royal Canadian Air Force (unrelated to No. 168 Squadron RAF) that formed at RCAF Station Rockcliffe, near Ottawa, Ontario in on 18 October 1943. The squadron carried large quantities of mail, freight and later, passengers between Canada and the United Kingdom, as well as to locations in Europe and Africa.

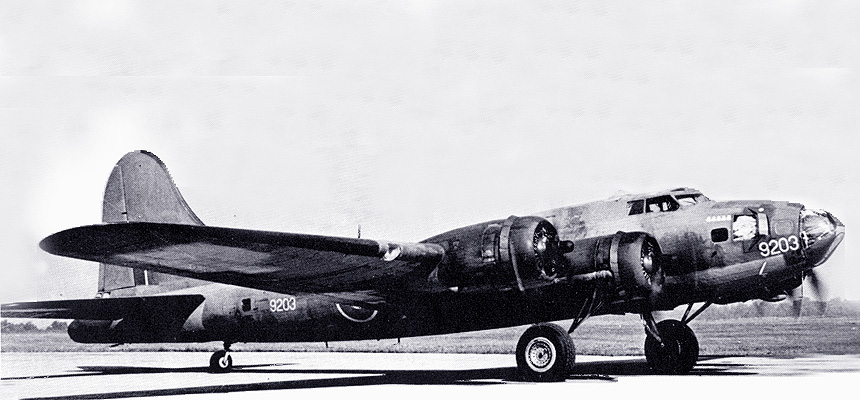
168 Squadron RCAF Boeing Fortress Mk. IIIA

Before October 1943, the Canadian Government had sent mail to Canadian service personnel in the United Kingdom by ship. However, high ship losses and the importance of mail to service personnel prompted the government to switch to air mail. The Squadron's primary role was to deliver mail to Europe, initially using six surplus Boeing Fortress heavy bomber aircraft acquired from the United States. All of the Fortresses were in poor condition when received and the RCAF made numerous modifications to the Fortresses, including the removal of the machine guns and their turrets and the installation of a replacement solid nose that increased the quantity of mail that could be carried. The paint was later stripped off the airframes to further lighten them.

The first scheduled mail flight was carried out by Fortress 9204 on 15 December 1943 with 2 passengers and 5,502 lb (2,496 kg) of mail after the aircraft intended for this flight, 9202 was grounded due to a mechanical problem. On 2 April 1944, Fortress 9207 crashed shortly after takeoff from Glasgow Prestwick Airport, killing all five crew members. In August 1944, the RCAF added the first of several Consolidated Liberators to the Squadron's strength. In addition to the Fortresses and Liberators, 168 Squadron also operated Douglas Dakotas and Lockheed Lodestar transports. A single Beechcraft Expeditor was loaned to the unit in 1944 from No. 12 (Communications) Squadron, and Lockheed Hudson Mk.III BW619 was borrowed in 1944 for mail runs in the Mediterranean.

During its period of service the squadron completed 636 Atlantic Ocean crossings and logged 26,417 flying hours. Over 1,000 t (2,200,000 lb) of mail, 4,000 t (8,800,000 lb) of freight and 42,057 passengers were transported, which included additional detached operations out of Great Britain as well as Gibraltar and Morocco. One of the squadron's VIP Liberators carried members of the British royal family, the Governor General of Canada and Canadian Prime Minister Mackenzie King.

Once most Canadian troops deployed to Europe had been repatriated following the end of the Second World War, the unit was disbanded on 21 April 1946.
