= Cerny, Essonne =

Commune in Île-de-France, France

Cerny
- Commune
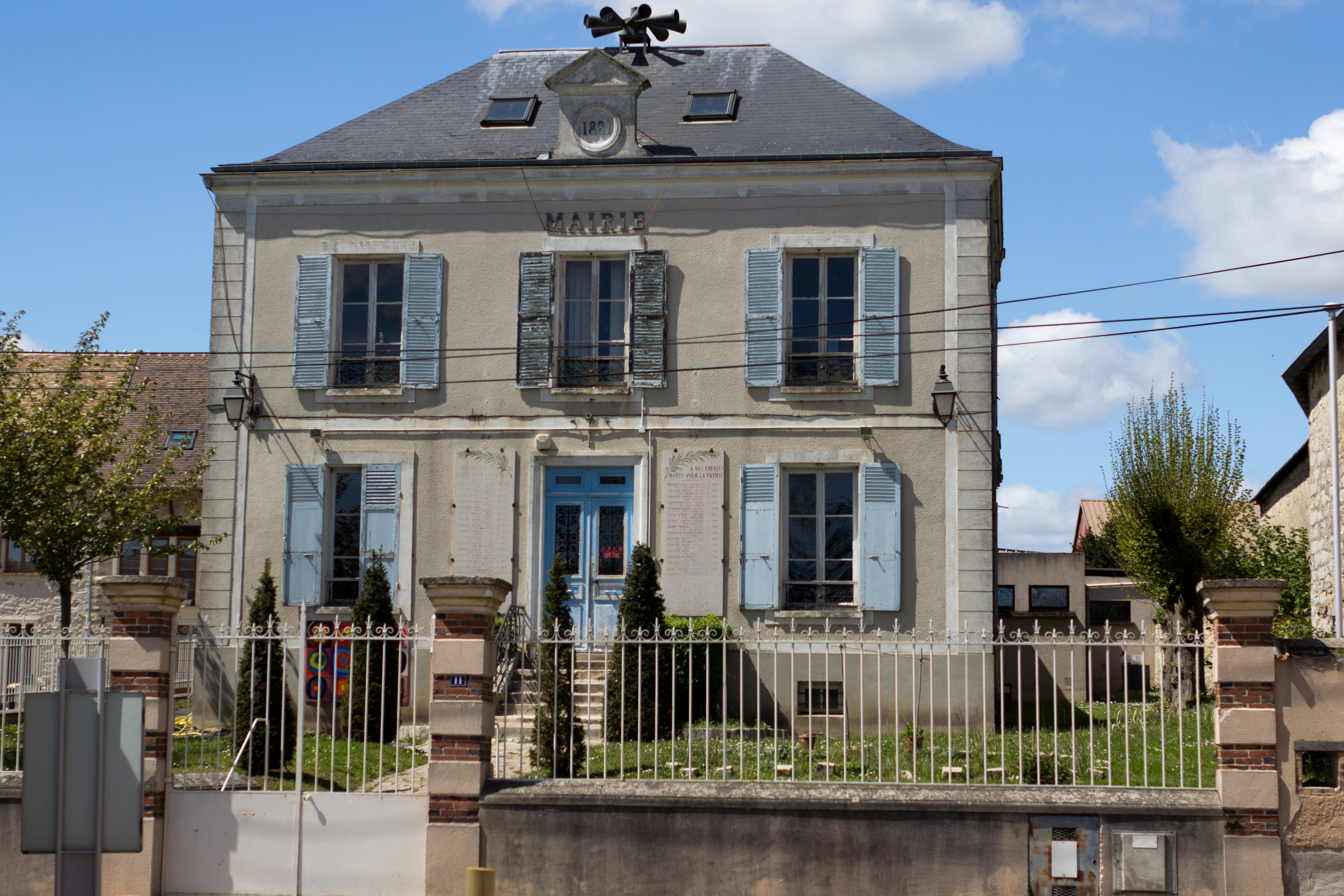
- The town hall of Cerny

- Coat of arms
- Location of Cerny
- Location within France Location within Île-de-France (region)
- Coordinates: 48°28′35″N 2°19′45″E
- Country: France
- Region: Île-de-France
- Department: Essonne
- Arrondissement: Étampes
- Canton: Étampes
- Intercommunality: Val d'Essonne

Government
  - Mayor (2020–2026): Marie-Claire Chambaret
- Area^{1}: 17.13 km^{2} (6.61 sq mi)
- Highest elevation: 152 m (499 ft)
- Lowest elevation: 52 m (171 ft)
- Population (2023): 3,531
  - Density: 206.1/km^{2} (533.9/sq mi)
- Time zone: UTC+01:00 (CET)
  - Summer (DST): UTC+02:00 (CEST)
- INSEE/Postal code: 91129 /91590
- ^{1} French Land Register data, which excludes lakes, ponds, glaciers > 1 km^{2} (0.386 sq mi or 247 acres) and river estuaries.

Cerny (French pronunciation: [sɛʁni]) is a commune in the Essonne department in Île-de-France in northern France. It is 53 km South of Paris.

It has an airfield named Aérodrome de Cerny - La Ferté-Alais, including an airplane museum.

== Population ==
Historical population
Year	Pop.	±% p.a.
1968	1,200	—
1975	1,659	+4.74%
1982	2,258	+4.50%
1990	2,774	+2.61%
1999	3,066	+1.12%
2007	3,225	+0.63%
2012	3,332	+0.65%
2017	3,336	+0.02%
2023	3,531	+0.95%
Source: INSEE

Inhabitants of Cerny are known as Cernois in French.

== Architectural heritage ==
Saint-Pierre Church, from the 13th century, officially became a historical monument 10 February 1948. Château de Villiers: François I gave the Villiers castle to Jean de Selve, after de Selve negotiated the Madrid treaty in 1526.

== Notable people from this commune ==
- Cécile Carnot (1841-1898), widow of Sadi Carnot, 4th president of the Third Republic. She died in Château de Presles.
- Philippe Clay (1927-2007), singer and actor who lived there

== See also ==
- La Ferté-Alais Air Show
- Communes of the Essonne department
