= 511th Bombardment Squadron =

511th Bombardment Squadron (later 11th Airborne Command and Control Squadron)
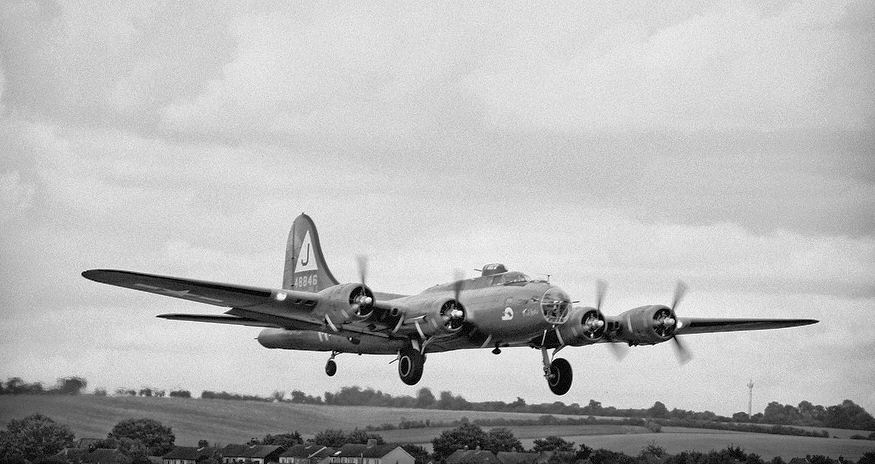
- 351st Group B-17G Flying Fortress landing (Note: Aircraft is Boeing B-17G-95-BO Flying Fortress, serial 43-38846. This aircraft survived the war and returned to the United States in December 1945. It was sold for scrap in September 1946. Baugher, Joe (10 April 2023). "1943 USAF Serial Numbers". Joe Baugher.)
- Active: 1942–1945; 1947–1949; 1969
- Country: United States
- Branch: United States Air Force
- Role: Heavy bomber
- Nickname: Ball Boys (World War II) (Note: The squadron nickname was taken after its commander, Major Clinton Ball. It was reflected in the emblem adopted by the squadron and in the names given to its airplanes, which included Cannon Ball, Fireball, Foul Ball, Highball, Screwball, Snowball, Spareball, Speedball, Spitball, Linda Ball (the commander's wife) and Lucille Ball. Freeman, p. 48.)
- Engagements: European Theater of Operations
- Decorations: Distinguished Unit Citation

Insignia
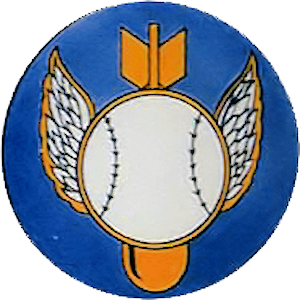
- 511th Bombardment Squadron emblem
- World War II fuselage code: DS

The 511th Bombardment Squadron is an inactive United States Air Force unit. It was last assigned to the 351st Bombardment Group at Fairfax Field, Kansas, where it was inactivated on 27 June 1949.

The squadron was first activated during World War II, as a Boeing B-17 Flying Fortress heavy bomber unit. After training in the United States, it deployed to the European Theater of Operations, where it participated in the strategic bombing campaign against Germany. It earned two Distinguished Unit Citations for its combat actions. Following V-E Day, the squadron returned to the United States, where it was inactivated in August 1945. It was activated in the reserves in 1947, but does not appear to have been fully manned or equipped.

In 1985, the squadron was consolidated with the 311th Attack Squadron, which served briefly in 1969 as a training unit for Cessna A-37 Dragonfly pilots during the Vietnam War. The consolidated squadron was designated the 11th Airborne Command and Control Squadron, but has not been active.

== History ==
=== World War II ===
The squadron was first activated at Salt Lake City Army Air Base, Utah on 1 October 1942 as one of the four original squadrons of the 351st Bombardment Group. Its cadre moved the same day to Gowen Field, Idaho, where it could begin manning as a heavy bomber unit. The squadron moved to Geiger Field, Washington in November and began training for combat with the Boeing B-17 Flying Fortress. The squadron completed its training in April 1943 and departed for the European Theater of Operations. The air echelon began ferrying its B-17s about 1 April, while the ground echelon left for the New York Port of Embarkation on 12 April.

The ground and air echelons had arrived at the unit's combat station, RAF Polebrook, England by 12 May 1943, and the squadron flew its first mission on 14 May. The squadron primarily flew strategic bombing missions against Germany. It struck targets including ball bearing factories at Schweinfurt; bridges near Köln; oil refineries at Hamburg; communications targets near Mayen; marshalling yards at Koblenz and industrial targets at Berlin, Hannover, and Mannheim. Other targets in France, Belgium, the Netherlands and Norway included airfields, harbor installations, and submarine pens.

On 9 October 1943, the squadron attacked the Arado Flugzeugwerke aircraft factory Anklam, Germany. Despite heavy flak and attacks by enemy fighters, accurate bombing inflicted heavy damage on the target. The squadron was awarded its first Distinguished Unit Citation (DUC) for this action. On 11 January 1944, as Operation Pointblank continued, it attacked the heavily defended Focke-Wulf Fw 190 production facility at Oschersleben, without fighter escort and in the face of the strongest fighter opposition encountered for five months, for which it earned a second DUC. It continued attacks on German aircraft production during Big Week, the concentrated attack by VIII Bomber Command against the German aircraft industry in late February.

The squadron was occasionally withdrawn from strategic missions to provide air support and interdiction. In the buildup to Operation Overlord, the invasion at Normandy, the squadron participated in Operation Crossbow, attacking V-1 flying bomb and V-2 rocket launch sites. In June 1944, it provided support for the landings, and the following month supported Operation Cobra, the breakout at Saint Lo. In September, it supported Operation Market Garden, an unsuccessful airborne attack attempting to obtain a bridgehead across the Rhine at Arnhem. From December 1944 through January 1945, it attacked front line positions during the Battle of the Bulge. In March 1945, it flew missions to support Operation Varsity, the airborne assault across the Rhine in Germany.

Following V-E Day, the squadron left England, with the first plane being flown back by its crew departing on 21 May 1945. The ground echelon sailed on the RMS Queen Elizabeth in June 1945. It briefly assembled at Sioux Falls Army Air Field, South Dakota, and was inactivated there on 28 August 1945.

=== Air Force reserve ===
The squadron was activated again in October 1947 in the reserves and trained at Fairfax Field under the supervision of Air Defense Command (ADC)'s 4101st AAF Base Unit (later the 2472d Air Force Reserve Training Center), although its headquarters, the 351st Bombardment Group, was stationed at Scott Field, Illinois. The following year Continental Air Command assumed responsibility for managing reserve units from ADC.

Although nominally a very heavy bomber unit, it is not clear whether or not the squadron was fully staffed or equipped. President Truman's reduced 1949 defense budget required reductions in the number of units in the Air Force, and the 511th was inactivated and most of its personnel transferred to elements of the 442d Troop Carrier Wing at Fairfax.

=== Attack training ===
The 311th Attack Squadron was activated in May 1969 at England Air Force Base, Louisiana and assigned to the 1st Special Operations Wing. Its mission was to train pilots on the Cessna A-37 Dragonfly. In July, the wing moved to Hurlburt Field and the squadron was reassigned to the 4410 Special Operations Training Group, which assumed the special operations training mission at England. In November, the squadron moved to Bien Hoa Air Base, where it was assigned to the 3d Tactical Fighter Wing. A month later, the squadron transferred its planes to the Vietnamese Air Force and was inactivated.

In September 1985, the 511th and 311th Squadrons were consolidated as the 11th Airborne Command and Control Squadron, without being activated.

== Lineage ==
511th Bombardment Squadron

- Constituted as the 511th Bombardment Squadron (Heavy) on 25 September 1942

Activated on 1 October 1942
Redesignated 511th Bombardment Squadron, Heavy c. 11 August 1944
Inactivated on 28 August 1945

- Redesignated 511th Bombardment Squadron, Very Heavy on 23 September 1947

Activated in the reserve on 15 October 1947
Inactivated on 27 June 1949

- Consolidated with the 311th Attack Squadron as the 11th Airborne Command and Control Squadron on 19 September 1985

11th Airborne Command and Control Squadron

- Constituted as the 311th Attack Squadron on 5 May 1969

Activated on 15 May 1969
Inactivated on 15 December 1969

- Consolidated with the 511th Bombardment Squadron as the 11th Airborne Command and Control Squadron on 19 September 1985

=== Assignments ===
- 351st Bombardment Group, 1 October 1942 – 28 August 1945
- 351st Bombardment Group, 15 October 1947 – 27 June 1949
- 1st Special Operations Wing, 15 May 1969
- 4410th Special Operations Training Group, 15 July 1969
- 3d Tactical Fighter Wing, 15 November–15 December 1969

=== Stations ===
- Salt Lake City Army Air Base, Utah, 1 October 1942
- Gowen Field, Idaho, 1 October 1942
- Geiger Field, Washington, November 1942
- Biggs Field, Texas, 2 January 1943
- Pueblo Army Air Base, Colorado, 2 March-12 April 1943
- RAF Polebrook (AAF-110), England, 12 May 1943 – 9 June 1945
- Sioux Falls Army Air Field, South Dakota, July–28 August 1945
- Fairfax Field, Kansas, 15 October 1947 – 27 June 1949
- England Air Force Base, Louisiana, 15 May 1969
- Bien Hoa Air Base, Vietnam 15 November– 15 December 1969

=== Aircraft ===
- Boeing B-17 Flying Fortress, 1942–1945
- Cessna A-37 Dragonfly, 1969

=== Awards and campaigns ===
Award streamer	Award	Dates	Notes
	Distinguished Unit Citation	9 October 1943	Germany
	Distinguished Unit Citation	11 January 1944	Germany

Campaign Streamer	Campaign	Dates	Notes
	Air Offensive, Europe	12 May 1943 – 5 June 1944	
	Air Combat, EAME Theater	12 May 1943 – 11 May 1945	
	Normandy	6 June 1944 – 24 July 1944	
	Northern France	25 July 1944 – 14 September 1944	
	Rhineland	15 September 1944 – 21 March 1945	
	Ardennes-Alsace	16 December 1944 – 25 January 1945	
	Central Europe	22 March 1944 – 21 May 1945	

== See also ==
- B-17 Flying Fortress units of the United States Army Air Forces
