= La Ferté-Alais =

Commune in Île-de-France, France

- Commune
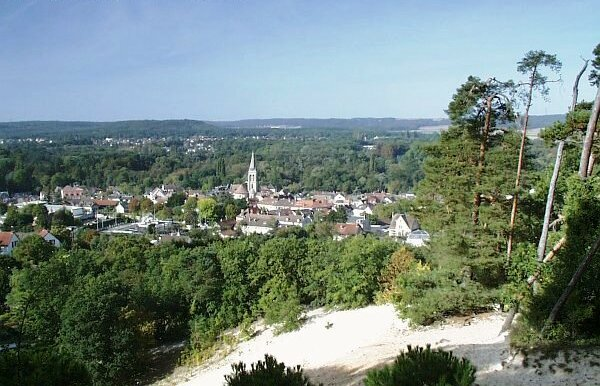
- View from the east, looking over the town towards the airfield

- Coat of arms
- Location of La Ferté-Alais
- Location within France Location within Île-de-France (region)
- Coordinates: 48°28′54″N 2°20′53″E
- Country: France
- Region: Île-de-France
- Department: Essonne
- Arrondissement: Étampes
- Canton: Mennecy

Government
  - Mayor (2020–2026): Mariannick Morvan
- Area^{1}: 4.55 km^{2} (1.76 sq mi)
- Highest elevation: 142 m (466 ft)
- Lowest elevation: 53 m (174 ft)
- Population (2023): 3,731
  - Density: 820/km^{2} (2,120/sq mi)
- Time zone: UTC+01:00 (CET)
  - Summer (DST): UTC+02:00 (CEST)
- INSEE/Postal code: 91232 /91590
- ^{1} French Land Register data, which excludes lakes, ponds, glaciers > 1 km^{2} (0.386 sq mi or 247 acres) and river estuaries.

La Ferté-Alais (French pronunciation: [la fɛʁte alɛ]) is a commune in the Essonne department in Île-de-France in northern France. It is 52 km (32 mi) south of Paris. It used to be a fortress closing the access to the French royal estate from the Essonne valley, then became an industrial village with sand and stones. Its airfield (actually in Cerny), hosts a world-famous air show for vintage World War I and WWII aircraft and a museum of such aircraft.

It even has the aircraft (still airworthy) that Louis Blériot used to cross the English Channel in 1909.

== Town name history ==
The town was known under the name Firmitas, Firmitas Aalipdis, Firmitas Adelaidis, Ferte in 1091, Firmitas Balduini, la Ferté Baudouin in the 12th century from the name of its lord in the 11th century, Feritas, Firmitas Aidelaidis around 1200, apud Feritatem Alisie in 1266, la Ferté Aales around 1263. The name La Ferte-Aleps appears in the Cassini maps and the final name of the commune is registered during its creation in 1793. It is possible to find the name La Ferté-Alaix and afterwards La Ferté-Alais in the law bulletin in 1801. But the final name will remain from 1845 onwards.

== Population ==
Historical population
Year	Pop.	±% p.a.
1968	1,448	—
1975	1,951	+4.35%
1982	2,002	+0.37%
1990	3,211	+6.08%
1999	3,556	+1.14%
2007	4,015	+1.53%
2012	3,982	−0.16%
2017	3,800	−0.93%
2023	3,731	−0.30%
Source: INSEE

Inhabitants of La Ferté-Alais are known as Fertois in French.

== See also ==
- La Ferté-Alais Air Show
- Communes of the Essonne department
