= WIFO =

WIFO may refer to:

- WIFO (Nazi company), a former solid fuel research institute in Nazi Germany
- WIFO-FM, a radio station
- Österreichisches Institut für Wirtschaftsforschung or the Austrian Institute of Economic Research
