= Otto Förschner =

German SS officer and concentration camp commander, convicted war criminal (1902–1946)

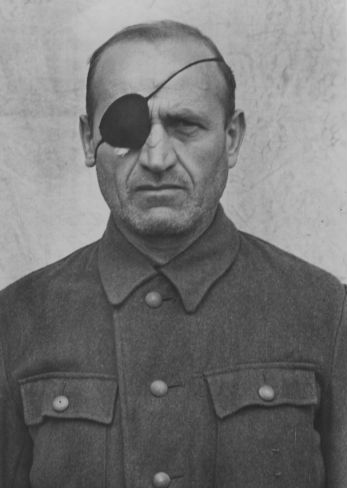
- Förschner in 1945
- Born: 4 November 1902; Dürrenzimmern (today part of Nördlingen), Kingdom of Bavaria German Empire
- Died: 28 May 1946 (aged 43); Landsberg Prison, Allied-occupied Germany
- Known for: Nazi concentration camp official
- Status: Executed by hanging
- Conviction: War crimes
- Trial: Dachau camp trial
- Penalty: Death
- Military career
- Allegiance: Weimar Republic; Nazi Germany
- Branch: Reichswehr; SS-Totenkopfverbände
- Rank: SS-Sturmbannführer
- Commands: Mittelbau-Dora concentration camp Kaufering concentration camp

Otto Förschner (4 November 1902 – 28 May 1946) was a German Schutzstaffel (SS) officer and a Nazi concentration camp commander. After serving with the Waffen-SS on the Eastern Front, Förschner worked as a senior official at the Buchenwald concentration camp (1942–1943) and later served as the commandant of Mittelbau-Dora (1943–1945) and Kaufering (1945). Following the German defeat, he was convicted of war crimes by US occupation authorities at the Dachau trials and was hanged in May 1946.

== Early life ==
Förschner was born in the town of Dürrenzimmern (today part of Nördlingen), Bavaria on 4 November 1902, and was raised on a farm owned by his family. In 1922, he enlisted in the Reichswehr, and would remain a soldier for the next twelve years. Following his departure from the army in 1934, he became a member of the Schutzstaffel (SS), and was assigned to its military-wing, the SS-Verfügungstruppe, the organization that would eventually become the Waffen-SS.

== SS career ==
Between April 1934 and December 1936, Förschner attended the SS training camp at Bad Tölz, and became a member of the Nazi Party in 1937. During the German invasion of the Soviet Union in 1941, he served as an officer with the 5th SS Panzer Division Wiking. After being wounded in action and declared medically unfit for combat duty, Förschner was transferred to the SS-Totenkopfverbände, taking over as Schutzhaftlagerführer (Preventative Detention Camp Leader) of the Buchenwald concentration camp in the spring of 1942.

In September 1943, Förschner was given command over the newly built concentration camp of Mittelbau-Dora, which at this time functioned as a sub-camp of the much larger Buchenwald. The purpose of Mittelbau-Dora was to provide slave-laborers from among its inmate population to the nearby V-weapons production facility of Mittelwerk. In addition to his position as commandant at Dora, Förschner was also technically the managing director of Mittelwerk GmbH, the front company created by the German government for V-weapons production. He would hold this post until April 1944, when he was replaced by Georg Rickhey.

Förschner had a contentious relationship with the various Nazi security services (the SD and the Gestapo) that operated in and around Mittelbau-Dora. His leadership was regularly criticized by them as being too "soft" on both the camp's prisoners and personnel. Of particular concern for them was Förschner's practice of selecting prisoner functionaries almost exclusively from among the camp's German-Communist inmates.

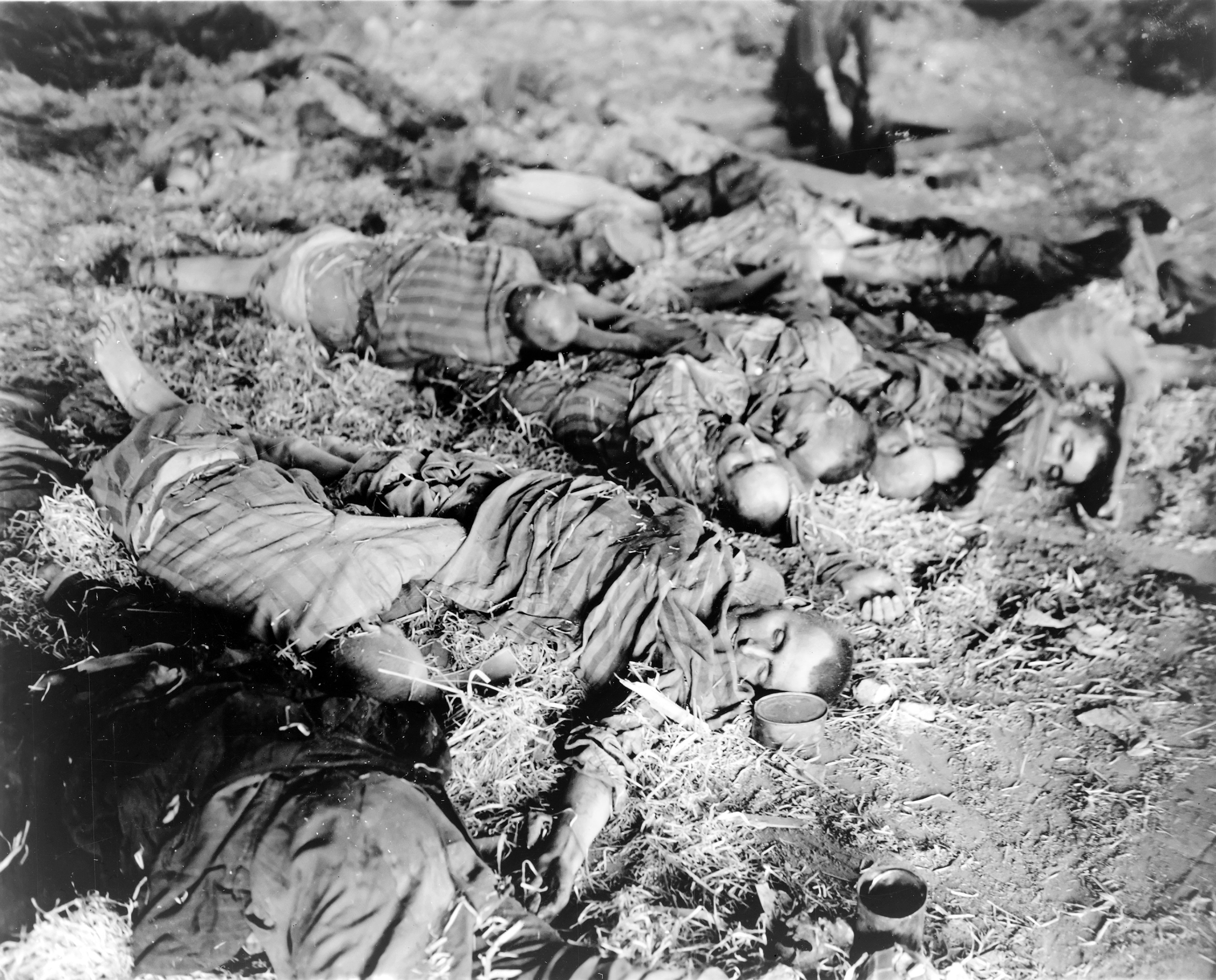
Dead workers lie in uneven rows on floors of barracks at Nordhausen.

Förschner's reputation in the Nazi party was badly damaged in November 1944, when many of the prisoner functionaries he had appointed were rounded up by the Gestapo and revealed to have been involved in resistance activities inside the camp, most notably the sabotage of V-weapons during the production process. After it was revealed that Förschner had failed to report a bonus payment of 10,000 ℛ︁ℳ︁ he had received from Mittelwerk GmbH, he was dismissed as commander of Mittelbau-Dora in February 1945, and replaced by former Auschwitz commandant Richard Baer.

After being relieved of command at Mittelbau-Dora, Förschner was transferred to Dachau, where he served briefly as commandant of the sub-camp of Kaufering.

== Trial and conviction ==
In April 1945, Förschner was taken prisoner by the US Army. He was a defendant in the Dachau concentration camp trial, in which he was indicted for war crimes stemming from his tenure at Kaufering. Namely, Förschner was charged with responsibility for the brutal conditions which prevailed in the camp and his role in the management of prisoner executions.

He was convicted by a US military tribunal and sentenced to death, along with 35 other co-defendants, on 13 December 1945. He was hanged at Landsberg Prison on 28 May 1946.
