= Mittelbau-Dora concentration camp =

Nazi concentration camp in Germany (1943–1945)

Mittelbau-Dora
- Concentration camp
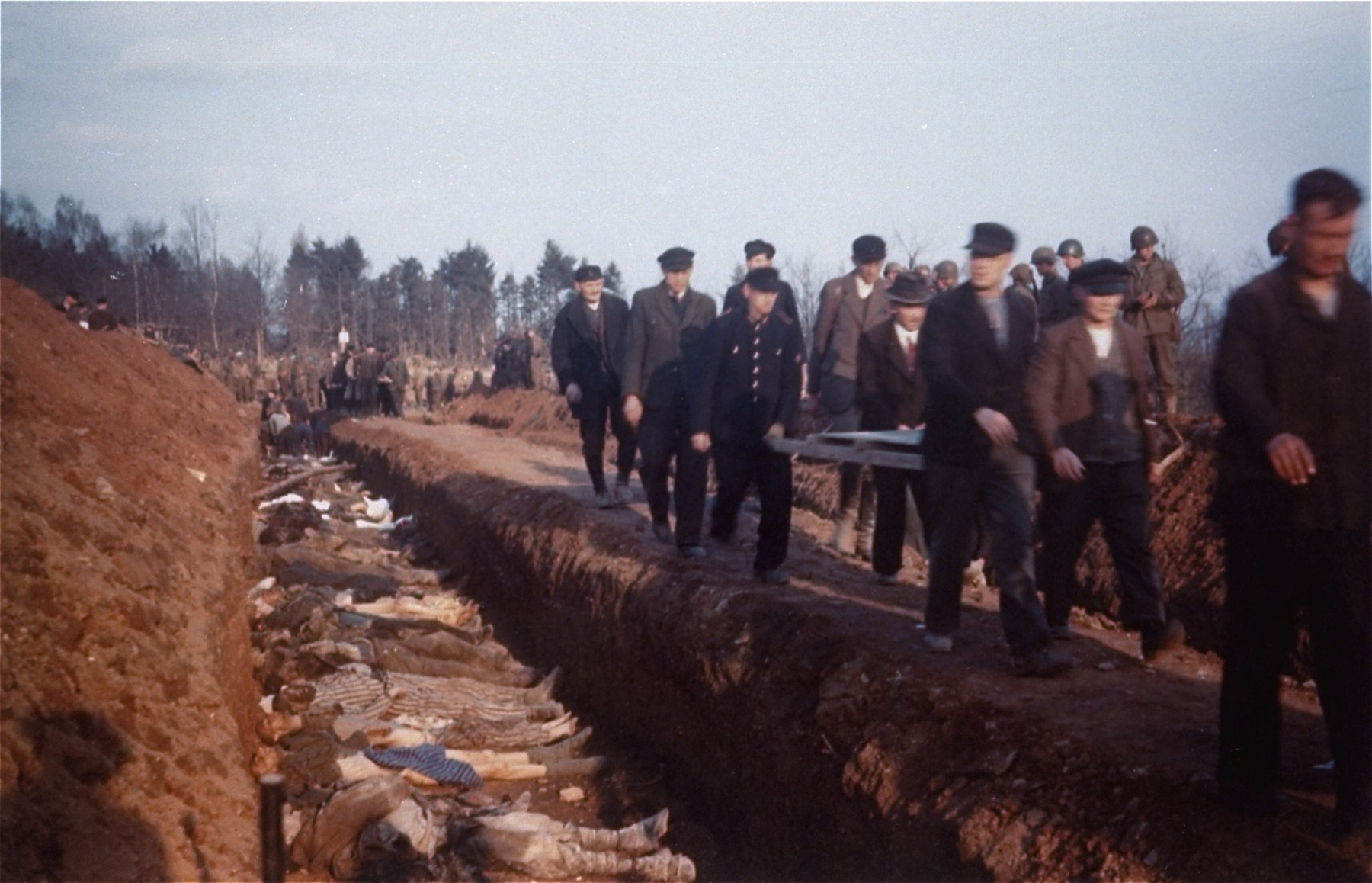
- Supervised by American soldiers, German civilians from Nordhausen bury the corpses of prisoners found at Mittelbau-Dora in April 1945.

- Germany (prewar borders) Germany (current borders) Thuringia
- Coordinates: 51°32′7.8″N 10°44′54.8″E
- Other names: Nordhausen-Dora
- Location: Nordhausen, Germany
- Operated by: SS
- Commandant: Otto Förschner (October 1944 – January 1945); Richard Baer (February 1945 – April 1945)
- Original use: Subterranean fuel depot (tunnels)
- Operational: 28 August 1943 – early April 1945
- Number of inmates: About 60,000
- Killed: About 20,000
- Liberated by: US Army (remaining installations)
- Notable inmates: Jean Améry, Heinz Galinski

Mittelbau-Dora (also Dora-Mittelbau and Nordhausen-Dora) was a Nazi concentration camp located near Nordhausen in Thuringia, Germany. It was established in late summer 1943 as a subcamp of Buchenwald concentration camp, supplying slave labour from many Eastern countries occupied by Germany (including evacuated survivors of eastern extermination camps), for extending the nearby tunnels in the Kohnstein and for manufacturing the V-2 rocket and the V-1 flying bomb. In the summer of 1944, Mittelbau became an independent concentration camp with numerous subcamps of its own. In 1945, most of the surviving inmates were sent on death marches or crammed in trains of box-cars by the SS. On 11 April 1945, US troops freed the remaining prisoners.

The inmates at Dora-Mittelbau were treated in a brutal and inhumane manner, working 14-hour days and being denied access to basic hygiene, beds, and adequate rations. Around one in three of the roughly 60,000 prisoners who were sent to Dora-Mittelbau died.

Today, the site hosts a memorial and museum.

== Background ==
In early summer 1943, mass production of the A4 (later better known as V-2, V standing for Vergeltung or retribution) ballistic rocket started at the Heeresanstalt Peenemünde on the Baltic island of Usedom as well as at the Raxwerke in Wiener Neustadt, Austria and at the Zeppelin works in Friedrichshafen on Lake Constance.

On 18 August 1943, a bombing raid by the Royal Air Force on Peenemünde ("Operation Hydra") seriously damaged the facilities and ended construction of V-2s there. Other air raids had damaged the other two sites in June and August. As a result, the Nazi leadership accelerated plans to move military construction to areas less threatened by Allied bombers. On 22 August 1943, Adolf Hitler ordered SS leader Heinrich Himmler to use concentration camp workers in future A4/V-2 production. One of the sites selected was at the mountain known as Kohnstein, near Nordhausen in Thuringia. Since 1936, the Wirtschaftliche Forschungsgesellschaft (WIFO) (English: Economic Research Company) had been building a subterranean fuel depot for the Wehrmacht there. By late summer 1943, this was almost finished.

To oversee the creation and operation of the new construction facility, Albert Speer, Himmler and Karl Saur agreed on the foundation of Mittelwerk GmbH (the name referring to the works' location in Mitteldeutschland). Its board consisted of Hans Kammler, who was head of Amtsgruppe C at the SS-Wirtschafts-Verwaltungshauptamt (WVHA) and two of Speer's armaments managers, Karl Maria Hettlage and Gerhard Degenkolb, the former seconded from Commerzbank. To actually run the plant, Albin Sawatzki, who had earlier been in charge of producing the "Tiger I" tank at Henschel, was appointed. Operational security for the project was overseen by SS-Oberstürmbannfuhrer Helmut Bischoff, a former Gestapo official and a member of Kammler's staff. The initial contract for Mittelwerk was for 12,000 rockets, valued at 750 million Reichsmark for a standard price per unit, once production reached 5,000 units, of 50,000 Reichsmark per rocket.

Especially for Kammler, this became a prestige project.

== Establishment ==
Only ten days after the raid on Peenemünde, on 28 August 1943, the first 107 concentration camp inmates from Buchenwald arrived with their SS guards at the Kohnstein. The official name of the new subcamp of Buchenwald was Arbeitslager Dora. Another 1,223 Buchenwald prisoners followed on 2 September and workers from Peenemünde came in mid-October. Over the next months, many more prisoners were brought to the area in almost daily transports from Buchenwald. By late September, the number of workers had risen to over 3,000, by late October to 6,800 and by Christmas 1943 to more than 10,500. Since there were initially no huts, the prisoners were housed inside the tunnels – in specially designated Schlafstollen with four levels of beds stacked over each other.

There were no sanitary facilities except for barrels that served as latrines. Inmates (the majority of them from the Soviet Union, Poland or France) died from hunger, thirst, cold and overwork. During the first months, most of the work done was heavy construction and transport. Only in January 1944, when production of the A4/V-2 began, were the first prisoners moved to the new above-ground camp on the south side of the mountain. Many had to sleep in the tunnels until May 1944.

In these initial months, from October 1943 to March 1944, out of a total of 17,500 slave labourers, almost 2,900 died at Dora. Another 3,000 who were very ill or dying were sent to Lublin-Majdanek and Bergen-Belsen concentration camps. Few of them survived. At the end of 1943, the Dora work squads had "the highest death rate in the entire concentration camp system".

By late 1943, production had started. On 10 December, Albert Speer and his staff visited the tunnels, observing the terrible conditions and finding them littered with corpses. Some members of Speer's staff were so shocked that they had to take an extra period of leave. A week later, Speer wrote to Kammler, congratulating him on his success "in transforming the underground installation ... from its raw condition two months ago into a factory, which has no equal in Europe and which is unsurpassed even when measured against American standards. I take this opportunity to express my appreciation for this really unique achievement and to ask you also in future to support Herr Degenkolb in this wonderful way."

== Operation ==
=== Prisoners ===
Inmates came from almost all countries of Europe; many of them had been arrested for political reasons. After May 1944, Jews were also brought to Mittelbau. With the dissolution of the so-called Zigeuner-Familienlager (Gypsy family camp) at Auschwitz-Birkenau, the SS transported many Roma and Sinti to Mittelbau between April and August 1944.

The prisoners were subject to extreme cruelty. As a result, they often suffered injuries, including permanent disability and disfigurement, and death. Severe beatings were routine, as was deliberate starvation, torture and summary executions.

In total, around 60,000 prisoners passed through the Mittelbau camps between August 1943 and March 1945. The precise number of people killed is impossible to determine. The SS files counted around 12,000 dead. In addition, an unknown number of unregistered prisoners died or were murdered in the camps. Around 5,000 sick and dying were sent in early 1944 and in March 1945 to Lublin and Bergen-Belsen.

Of those killed, around 350 were hanged (including 200 for sabotage). The rate of executions notably accelerated after the personnel from Auschwitz arrived: in February and March 1945, the SS on some days hanged 30, on one occasion even 50 prisoners.

=== Rocket production ===
On 1 January 1944, the Mittelwerk delivered its first three rockets, all of which suffered from serious production defects. The SS considered those prisoners who had expanded the tunnels in autumn and winter of 1943/44 as unusable in actual production work, because they were either too weakened or not qualified for work on the assembly lines. As a result, new prisoners were brought in from other concentration camps. From March 1944, the others were moved to newly created subcamps in the area around Nordhausen where they continued to be used for digging new tunnels or working at construction sites above ground.

By late January, 56 rockets had been produced. By May, monthly output was 400 units. There were still defects, resulting in launch-pad and mid-air explosions. Output was still far below the goal of 1,000 units per month. Wernher von Braun visited the Nordhausen plant on 25 January 1944 and again on 6 May 1944, when he met Walter Dornberger, Arthur Rudolph and Albin Sawatzki, discussing the need to enslave another 1,800 skilled French workers.

On 8 September 1944, the first V-2 built at Mittelbau was successfully launched targeting London. That month, production hit 600 units, a pace that was kept up until February 1945.

=== Construction and subcamps ===
On 31 December 1943, construction of the above-ground camp, less than a kilometre from the tunnel B entrance was sufficiently completed for the workers to move in. The underground detainee accommodations (Schlafstollen or "sleeping tunnels") were dismantled in May 1944.

Besides the main camp Dora, housing an average of 15,000 prisoners, the main subcamps were Lager Ellrich (established 2 May 1944, averaging around 8,000 prisoners), Lager Harzungen (1 April 1944, 4,000 prisoners), Lager Rottleberode (13 March 1944, 1,000 prisoners) and the SS construction units III and IV (totaling around 3,000 prisoners, distributed among several small camps along a newly constructed railway line between Nordhausen and Herzberg am Harz. More subcamps were added once Mittelbau was officially independent. By spring 1945, the number of inmates totaled over 40,000 in around 40 camps.

From spring/summer 1944, the camp became the centre of a subcamp system of its own. Originally, these still were part of the Buchenwald system. With the creation of the Jägerstab (Fighter Staff), led by Speer, as an institution to oversee a boost to fighter plane production and the move of military production underground, facilities for the production of fighter planes for the Junkers company were to be created around Nordhausen – along with the necessary infrastructure. In addition, after the creation of the Geilenbergstab (named after Edmund Geilenberg), over the summer of 1944 more underground construction was requested for the German petroleum industry. Demand for workers for these projects was satisfied with concentration camp prisoners, but also with foreign forced labourers, POWs and drafted Germans.

The SS administration separated Mittelbau-Dora from Buchenwald at the end of September 1944 and Dora became the center of it. In effect, the new camp became officially operational on 1 November 1944 with 32,471 prisoners.

=== Decline ===
By the time Dora became operational in November 1944, the decline of Mittelbau-Dora was already beginning. With the subcamps overcrowded and the weather turning colder, conditions in all camps deteriorated and the death rate rose significantly. After peaking in March 1944 at 750, this had declined to 100 to 150 per month by the summer. From November it picked up and in December 1944 the official tally was 570, of whom 500 died at Lager Ellrich.

==== Transfers from Auschwitz ====
At the end of 1944, the SS began to evacuate the inmates of Auschwitz and Gross-Rosen before the advancing Red Army. Many of them were transported to the Mittelbau. Through March 1945, up to 16,000 prisoners arrived, including women and children. Although many died in transit, this raised the number of Jews at Mittelbau. Those who survived were often extremely weak or sick. Once again, the death rate rose: Between January and early April 1945, around 6,000 inmates died, around 3,000 of them at the Boelcke-Kaserne (a former Luftwaffe barracks) at Nordhausen, which had been used by the SS after January 1945 as the main Sterbelager (camp for the dying) for the Mittelbau system. Also from January to April 1945, at least 1,700 V-2 and over 6,000 V-1 rockets were built.

Along with the inmates from Auschwitz arrived several hundred SS guards who joined the staff at Mittelbau, including Richard Baer, who succeeded Otto Förschner as overall Mittelbau commandant on 1 February 1945. Baer replaced most senior personnel with people from Auschwitz. Franz Hössler became commandant of the Häftlinglager Dora. Eduard Wirths became the new Standortarzt. Max Sell became head of the Arbeitseinsatz-Dienststelle which coordinated the use of forced labour. Hans Schurz became head of the Politische Abteilung (the local Gestapo office).

==== Allied attacks ====
On 3 and 4 April 1945, Nordhausen was attacked in two waves by several hundred Lancasters and Mosquitos of Nos 1 and 8 Groups of the Royal Air Force Bomber Command. Around 75% of the town was destroyed, the medieval old town was hit particularly hard. Out of 40,000 inhabitants, roughly 8,800 people died, 20,000 lost their homes. Among the dead were also an estimated 1,300-1,500 Mittelbau prisoners, who were confined at the Boelcke-Kaserne at the time.

== Evacuation ==
In early April 1945, as US troops were advancing towards the Harz, the SS decided to evacuate most of the Mittelbau camps. In great haste and with considerable brutality, the inmates were forced to board box cars. Several trains, each with thousands of prisoners, left the area through 6 April for Bergen-Belsen, Sachsenhausen and Ravensbrück. Others were forced to walk through the Harz hills towards the northeast. Those unable to keep up with these death marches were summarily shot by the guards.

The worst atrocity occurred at Gardelegen, known as the Gardelegen massacre. More than 1,000 prisoners from Mittelbau and Neuengamme subcamps were murdered in a barn that was set on fire. Those who were not burned alive were shot by SS, Wehrmacht and men of the Volkssturm.

Overall, although no reliable statistics on the number of deaths on these transports exist, estimates put the number of prisoners killed at up to 8,000.

== Liberation ==
As most of the camps of the Mittelbau system were completely evacuated, there were not many prisoners left to be liberated by the Allies. Only some small subcamps, mostly containing Italian POWs, were not evacuated. The SS also left several hundred sick prisoners at Dora and in the Boelcke-Kaserne. They were freed when US troops (consisting of the 3rd Armored Division, the 104th Infantry Division, and the 9th Infantry Division) reached Nordhausen on 11 April 1945. There were also around 1,300 dead prisoners at the barracks.

War correspondents took pictures and made films of the dead and dying prisoners at Dora. Like the documentation of Nazi atrocities at Bergen-Belsen, these were published around the globe and became some of the best-known testimonies of Nazi crimes.

Most of those inmates who survived the transports were freed in mid-April at Bergen-Belsen or at other camps. Some, however, remained prisoners until early May and were freed in Mecklenburg or Austria.

In total, even conservative estimates put the number of people who did not survive being sent to Mittelbau-Dora at over 20,000. Thus, around one in three of those confined here did not survive.

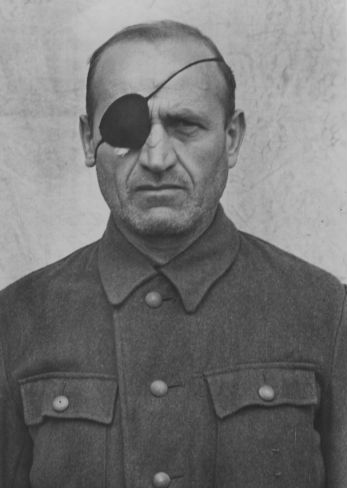
Otto Förschner, camp commandant (after 11 April 1945)

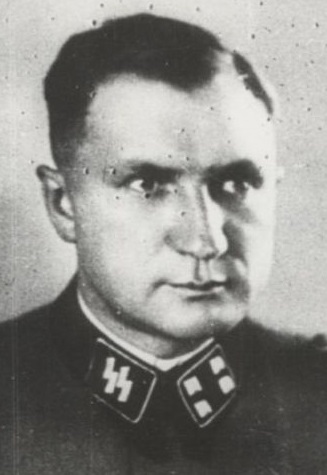
Richard Baer, camp commandant

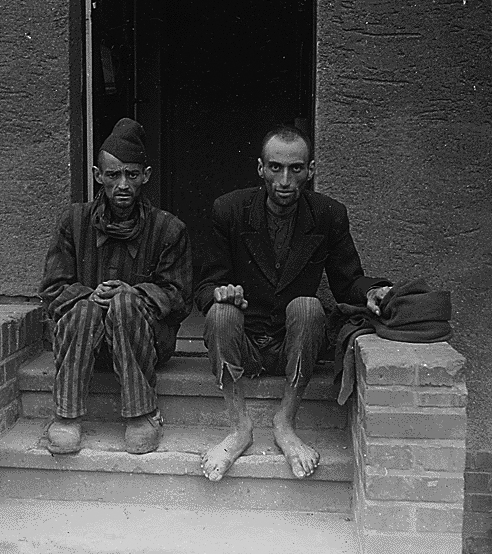
Emaciated survivors of Nordhausen after liberation of the camp, 12 April 1945

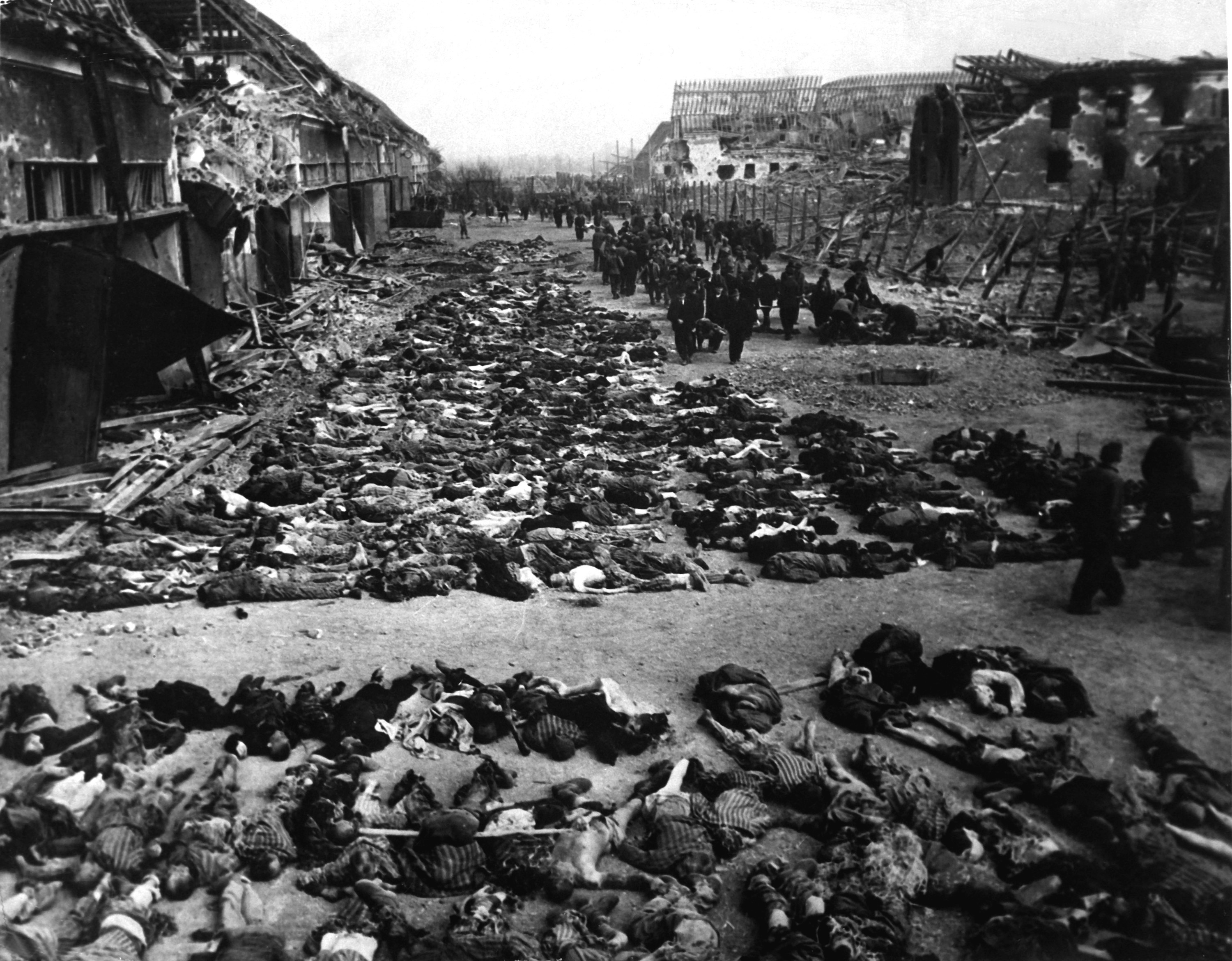
Aftermath of the British bombing raid of 3 and 4 April 1945 that destroyed the Boelcke-Kaserne (Note: The Boelcke-Kaserne (Boelcke Barracks) was located in the south-east part of Nordhausen. Around 1300 inmates were killed in the British bombing raid. The barracks was a subcamp of Mittelbau-Dora Nazi concentration camp. Used as an overflow camp for sick and dying inmates from January 1945, numbers rose from a few hundred to over 6000, and the conditions saw up to 100 inmates die every day.)

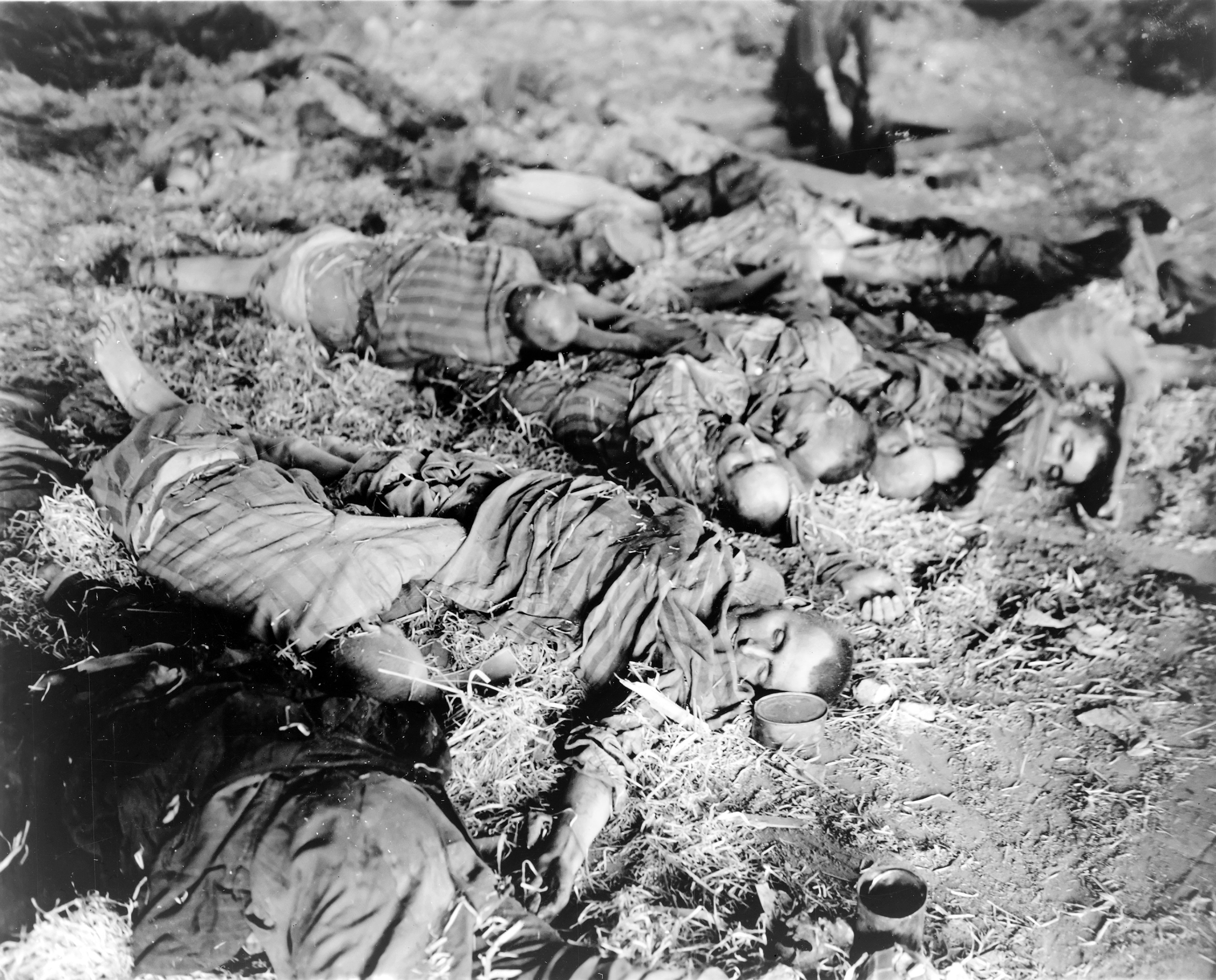
Dead workers lie in uneven rows on floors of barracks at Nordhausen.

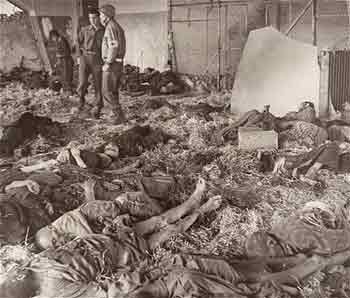
Corpses of prisoners in a Nordhausen barracks

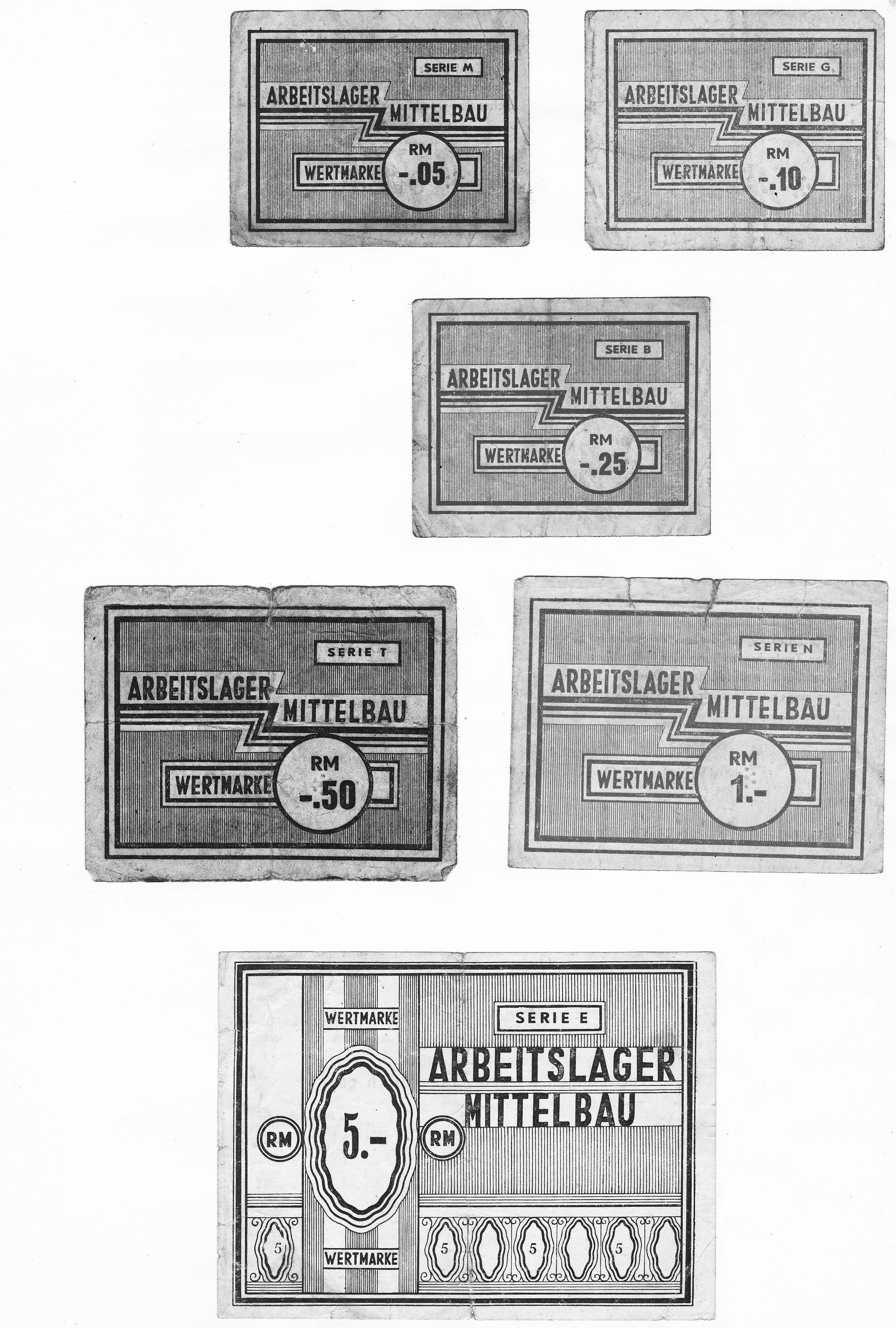
Camp money

== Aftermath ==
=== Bergen-Belsen ===
Transports from Mittelbau arrived at Bergen-Belsen between 8 and 11 April 1945. Several thousand men were housed in the so-called Kasernenlager around 2 kilometres (1.2 miles) north of the main camp, which was already overflowing with prisoners. Of the approximately 15,000 prisoners from Mittelbau, about half were from the Soviet Union and Poland. Although not in good health, these men were much healthier than most of the prisoners in the Belsen main camp. When the British Army liberated Belsen on 15 April, many of the inmates turned on their former overseers at Mittelbau. About 170 of these "Kapos" were killed that day.

=== Belsen Trial ===
Some of the SS personnel who had come from Auschwitz with the evacuation trains went on to Bergen-Belsen when Mittelbau was itself evacuated. A few of them, notably Franz Hössler, were prosecuted by the British military authorities at the Belsen trial in Lüneburg in September 1945. However, charges at this trial related only to crimes committed either at Auschwitz or at Bergen-Belsen, not at Mittelbau. Hössler was among those found guilty and executed on 13 December 1945.

=== Dora Trial ===
Following the June 1945 Fedden Mission investigation of conditions at Dora, the trial "The United States of America versus Arthur Kurt Andrae et al." trial commenced on 7 August 1947 at the Dachau internment camp against 19 defendants. Otto Förschner was not a defendant in the Dora Trial, since he had already been executed after being convicted in the Dachau camp trial.

The court convicted 15 Dora SS guards and Kapos (one of them was executed), four defendants were acquitted. The trial also addressed the question of liability of the engineers and scientists — former Generaldirektor of Mittelwerk Georg Rickhey was acquitted. Arthur Rudolph (recruited in 1945 under Operation Paperclip and later exiled from the US in 1984) was not even charged. A related trial was also held 1959–1961 in Essen.

=== Research continuity ===
Immediately after taking control of the area, US specialists began to inspect the rocket works and seized materials, parts and documents. They were later joined by British experts. Eventually the Soviets took over.

Apart from Rickhey, Rudolph, and von Braun, several dozen former Mittelwerk engineers and scientists quickly hired on with the US government. They first constructed rocket weapons or jet planes and then mostly went on to join the American space program. The Soviets also hired some of the engineers.

Like the rocket engineers, many construction engineers at Mittelwerk were able to continue with their careers. Very few were charged in connection with their role in the Nazi slave labour program.

=== DP camp ===
After liberation, the US forces and the United Nations Relief and Rehabilitation Administration (UNRRA) turned Dora and Harzungen camps into accommodations for displaced persons (DPs). In mid-May 1945, there were around 14,000 people living at Dora, several hundred liberated concentration camp inmates and many POWs as well as foreign civilian forced labourers. Repatriation was fairly quick for those from Western Europe, but many from Eastern Europe had to wait months before they were able to return home. In early July, Thuringia passed from American to Soviet control. The Red Army now used Dora as a repatriation camp for former Polish and Soviet slave labourers. The Soviet authorities treated their citizens who had been forced to work for the Germans with suspicion, blaming them for collaborating with the enemy. These men were subject to debriefing by the Soviet secret service and some of them were imprisoned once more and sent to the Gulag.

=== Umsiedlerlager ===
Once the last forced labourers had left, Dora camp was used from December 1945 by German authorities as a holding camp for Germans expelled from Czechoslovakia. They were then distributed among various municipalities in northern Thuringia. The number of expelled housed in the camp averaged about 5,000. The camp was dissolved in July 1946.

=== Demolition ===
After that, the town of Nordhausen had the huts at Dora dismantled and re-erected at other locations in the district as emergency housing for the homeless. Only the camp's crematorium, the fire station and the camp prison remained. Nature reclaimed the area of the camp. The Soviets briefly continued to use parts of the tunnel network for manufacturing rockets. In 1947, the entrances and some internal parts were blown up in accordance with the Allied agreement to destroy military facilities in Germany.

Similar to what happened at Dora, most of the subcamps were soon dismantled and the wood used for heating or new construction. Local authorities decided in 1952 to demolish the Dora camp prison – in the face of protests by former detainees.

== Memorial ==
=== German Democratic Republic ===
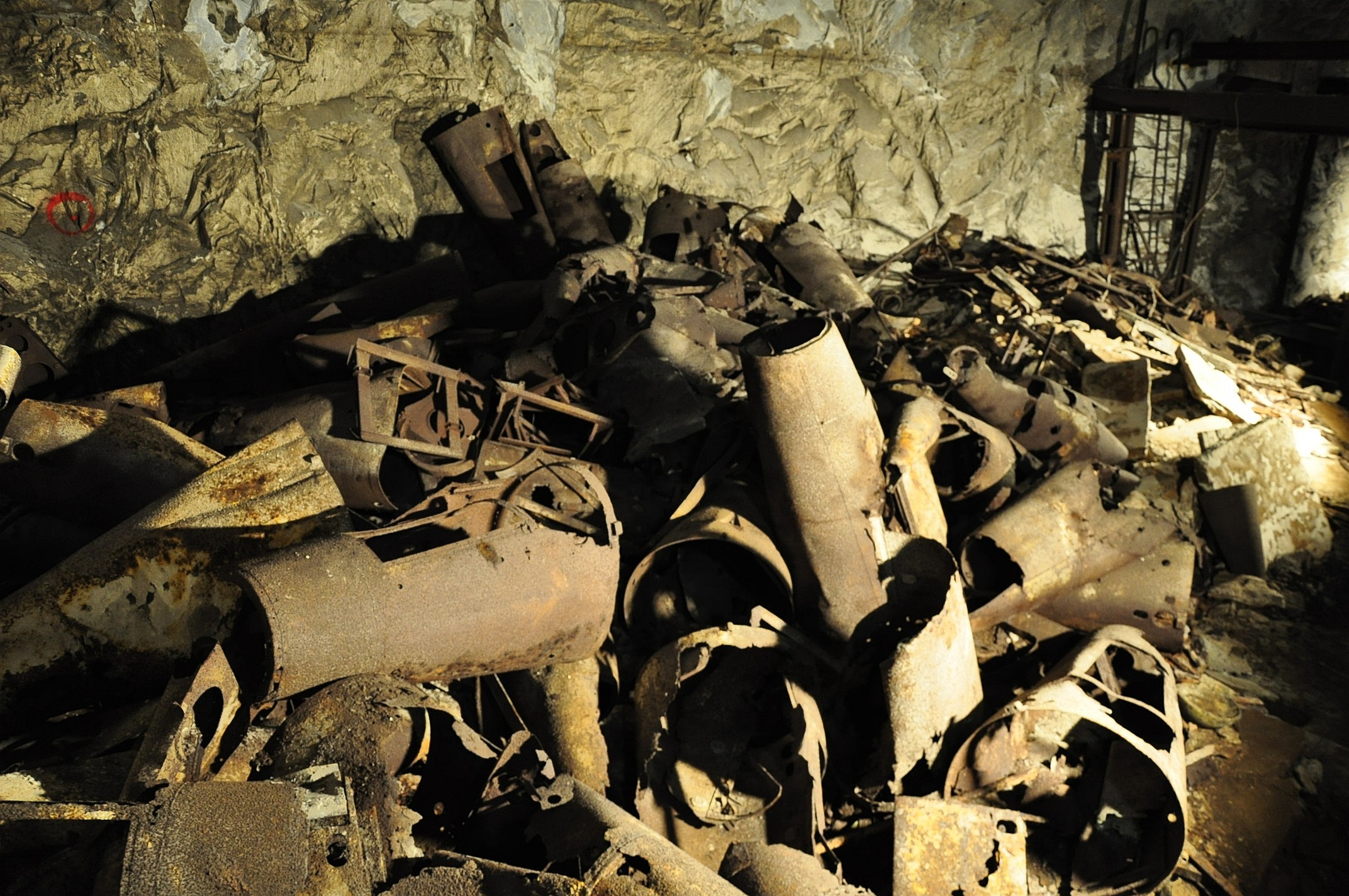
Parts of bombs and rockets still litter the underground corridors of the camp (2012).

By the early 1950s, most of the traces of the central Dora camp had disappeared. Whilst the prison was being demolished, some people from Nordhausen began to turn the area around the crematorium into a memorial and cemetery. In 1964, the local district SED created the Mahn- und Gedenkstätte Dora and had a sculpture by the artist Jürgen von Woyski erected in front of the crematorium. In 1966, a permanent exhibition opened inside the building under the title Die Blutspur führt nach Bonn ("the blood trail leads to Bonn"), implying a historical continuity between the Nazi concentration camp and the government of West Germany.

By contrast with Buchenwald, Sachsenhausen and Ravensbrück, the communist government of the GDR never raised Dora to the status of Nationale Mahn- und Gedenkstätte (national memorial). In the early 1970s, the local authorities turned the completely overgrown muster ground into an Ehrenplatz der Nationen with a rostrum, flag poles and an eternal fire. In 1988, an attempt was made to access one of the tunnels inside Kohnstein, but it was abandoned due to a lack of funds that same year.

=== Reunified Germany ===
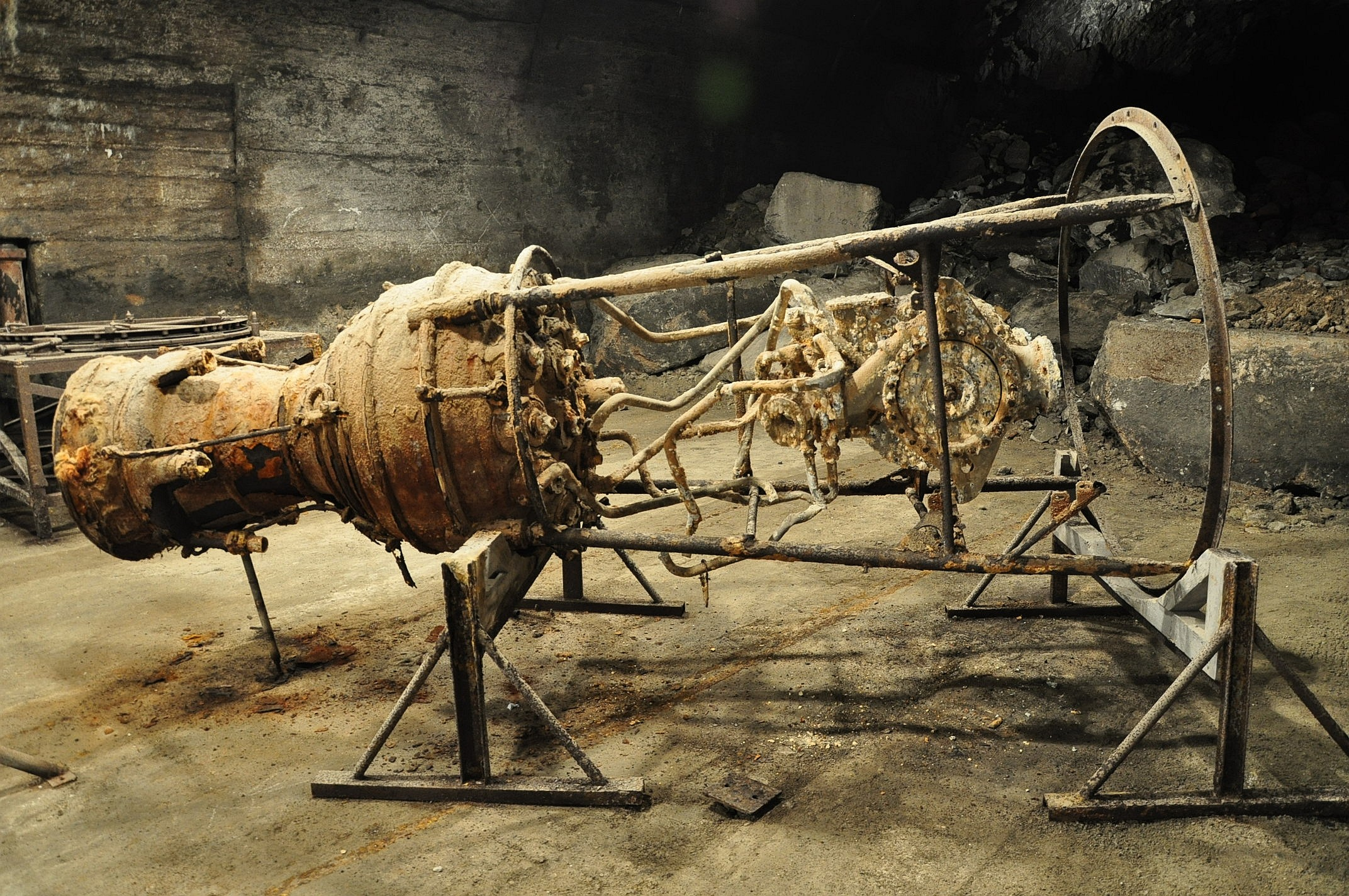
Rusty V-2 rocket engine in the underground production facilities of the camp (2012)

After reunification, the memorial was redesigned. A small portion of the original tunnel system was reopened and has been accessible to visitors since 1995. Since 2000, the Stiftung Gedenkstätten Buchenwald und Mittelbau-Dora runs the memorial, financed by the Thuringian state and the federal government. The GDR era memorial installations were left intact as a documentation of the way the Communist regime treated the Nazi past. A new permanent exhibition opened in a new museum building in 2006. Some work has also been done at the largest subcamp, Lager Ellrich-Juliushütte, that had been cut in half by the inner-German border.

== See also ==
- The subcamps of Konzentrationslager Mittelbau
- Erna Petermann
- The Good German
- In the Shadow of Dora: A Novel of the Holocaust and the Apollo Program by Patrick Hicks
- Colette (2020 film)
