= Helmut Bischoff =

German SS-Obersturmbannführer, Gestapo officer and Nazi government official (1908–1993)

- Born: 1 March 1908; Glogau, Province of Silesia; German Empire
- Died: 1 January 1993 (aged 84); Hamburg, Germany
- Military career
- Allegiance: Nazi Germany
- Branch: Allgemeine-SS
- Rank: SS-Obersturmbannführer
- Units: SS-Reich Security Main Office (1939–1943); SS-Main Economic and Administrative Office (1943–1945)
- Conflicts: World War II; Invasion of Poland (1939); German V-2 campaign (1943–1945)

Helmut Hermann Wilhelm Bischoff (1 March 1908 – 1 January 1993) was a German SS-Obersturmbannführer, Gestapo officer and Nazi government official. During World War II, he was the leader of Einsatzkommando 1/IV in Poland and later headed the Gestapo offices in Poznań (Posen) and Magdeburg.

From 1943 to 1945 Bischoff served as a senior deputy to SS-Obergruppenführer Hans Kammler and was the chief of security for Germany's V-weapons program. He later commanded the Sicherheitsdienst (SD) at the Mittelbau-Dora concentration camp. Following the war, Bischoff would spend nearly a decade in Soviet captivity. He was repatriated to West Germany in 1955. Between 1967 and 1970 Bischoff was a defendant in the Essen-Dora war crimes trial.

== Early life ==
Helmut Bischoff was born on 1 March 1908 in the town of Glogau in the Province of Silesia, then a part of the German Empire (now: Głogów, Poland). He was the son of a prosperous metzgermeister (master butcher) and attended the Glogau Gymnasium. From 1923–1925 Bischoff was a member of Jungwiking, the youth-wing of the Viking League, an ultra-nationalist and antisemitic paramilitary group that succeeded the banned far-right Organisation Consul. After graduating from gymnasium, Bischoff went on to study law at Leipzig University (where he was a member of the Leipziger Burschenschaft Dresdendia) and the University of Geneva.

It was during his time as a law student that Bischoff first became active in the Nazi movement. He joined the Nazi Party in March 1930 (Member # 203 122) and the Sturmabteilung (SA) in 1933. After receiving his doctorate of jurisprudence (Dr. jur.), Bischoff returned to his native Lower Silesia and worked as an assessor at the district court offices in Schweidnitz and Strehlen. By 1934, Bischoff had also begun serving as a confidential informant (Vertrauensmann) for the Sicherheitsdienst (SD), the Nazi Party's internal intelligence service.

== Gestapo ==
After completing his legal clerkship, Bischoff joined the Schutzstaffel (SS) in November 1935 (SS # 272 403). He entered the Gestapo shortly afterward and served as chief of the organization's district bureau in Liegnitz until October 1936. Bischoff went on to lead the Gestapo departments in Harburg-Wilhelmsburg (1936-1937) and Köslin (1937-1939). By the outbreak of World War II he had risen to the rank of Sturmbannführer (Major) in the Allgemeine-SS.

=== Einsatzgruppe IV ===
During the invasion of Poland in September 1939, Bischoff served as the commander of Einsatzkommando 1/IV (a sub-unit of Lothar Beutel's Einsatzgruppe IV) which was deployed in the northern Polish territories of Pomerania, Warsaw, Białystok and Polesie. Bischoff's unit was involved in the bloody pacification of Bydgoszcz (Bromberg) along with the mass-killing of ethnic Poles carried out as part of Operation Tannenberg, the Nazi ethnic cleansing campaign targeting Poland's intelligentsia and other members of the nation's elite.

On 27 September 1939 Bischoff and his Einsatzkommando staged a raid on the town of Pułtusk. The action ended with the mass-expulsion of the town's large Jewish population from their homes, followed by their deportation across the Narew River into the Soviet-occupied east. In October 1939 Einsatzgruppe IV was placed under the command of SS-Standartenführer Josef Albert Meisinger and stationed in Warsaw, where it took part in the initial round-up of the city's Jewish residents, setting in motion their eventual ghettoization.

=== Poznań and Magdeburg ===
Following the dissolution of Einsatzgruppe IV in November 1939, Bischoff was transferred to the newly annexed Polish territory of Reichsgau Wartheland and served as chief of the Gestapo for the city of Poznań (Posen). In this capacity Bischoff was also the acting commandant of the Fort VII concentration camp, which was initially called "KZ Posen" and in 1939 became "Übergangslager (transit camp) Fort VII". While primarily a detention center, Fort VII also served as a regular execution site for many local Poles, Jews and the physically or mentally disabled. Prisoners usually remained in the camp for about six months, before being sentenced to death, a long prison term or transfer to a larger concentration camp.

Bischoff was promoted to the rank of SS-Obersturmbannführer (Lieutenant Colonel) in September 1941 and returned to Germany, where he had been appointed chief of the State Police Headquarters (Staatspolizeileitstelle) in Magdeburg. Bischoff played a central role in orchestrating the deportation of the Jews from Magdeburg and the nearby towns of Stendal, Dessau, Bernburg and Aschersleben. Hundreds of German Jews were deported by the SS and security services between November 1942 and March 1943. The initial wave of deportees were routed mainly to the ghettoes of Theresienstadt and Warsaw, while later rail transports were dispatched directly to Auschwitz-Birkenau.

== V-weapons security chief ==
In December 1943 Bischoff was reassigned to the SS-Main Economic and Administrative Office (SS-WVHA) and attached to the general staff of SS-Obergruppenführer Hans Kammler, ostensibly as a representative of the Organisation Todt. Kammler was the director of Amtsgruppe C (Buildings and Works), the organization tasked with managing the extensive civil and military engineering projects of the SS-WVHA. This included the construction of factories, storehouses and other manufacturing facilities for Germany's various secret weapons programs.

Most of Germany's V-1 flying bombs and V-2 ballistic missiles were produced at Mittelwerk, a major armaments factory housed in an elaborate tunnel system in the Harz Mountains that had been built, and was partially administered, by Amtsgruppe C. The complex and dangerous work performed to assemble the V-weapons themselves was done under brutal conditions in the tunnels by thousands of slave-laborers (mainly Russians, Poles and French, among other nationalities) drawn from the inmate population of the adjunct Mittelbau-Dora concentration camp.

Bischoff was appointed by Kammler to serve as "Defense Officer" (Abwehrbeauftragter) for Germany's V-weapons program. As chief of security, Bischoff managed counter-intelligence operations by the German security services meant to conceal the Nazi missile production program's existence from Allied intelligence. Bischoff was also responsible for preventing organized attempts by Mittelwerk's prisoner-laborers to sabotage the V-weapons during the assembly process.

=== Mittelbau-Dora ===
In February 1944 the SS police and security services in the Nordhausen district (which surrounded Mittelwerk and the adjunct camp of Mittelbau-Dora) were placed under the authority of Bischoff's organization, now headquartered in Ilfeld. Counter-sabotage operations began soon after, mainly targeting the numerous resistance organizations operating among the prisoners working in the tunnels at Mittelwerk and those imprisoned in the camp at Dora.

At Bischoff's direction, Mittelbau-Dora's Politische Abteilung (Political Department) had the leaders of the camp's Russian, French and Communist inmates rounded up in November 1944 and interned in solitary confinement. Many of those taken into custody were interrogated under torture with some later being executed. In February 1945 the SS administration of Mittelbau-Dora was reorganized under former Auschwitz commandant Richard Baer. Under this new arrangement, Bischoff took over as chief of the camp's Sicherheitsdienst (SD) bureau.

As chief of the camp's SD, Bischoff supervised a wave of executions at Mittelbau-Dora in March 1945 that saw hundreds of prisoners, mostly Soviet POWs, killed in a series of mass-hangings. He also ordered the surviving leadership of the camp's resistance organizations to be shot by firing squad prior to the liberation of Mittelbau-Dora by the US Army in April 1945. In all, roughly 20,000 people died at either Mittelwerk or Mittelbau-Dora between 1943 and 1945.

== Postwar ==
Following the German defeat, Bischoff went into hiding in Bavaria and Hamburg before returning to Magdeburg, where he was identified and arrested by the Soviet security services in January 1946. Bischoff was interned at NKVD Special Camp No. 1 near Mühlberg until September 1948 when he was transferred to NKVD Special Camp No. 2 (formerly the Buchenwald concentration camp) outside of Weimar.

In January 1950 Bischoff was deported to the Soviet Union. He was sentenced to twenty five years hard labor by a military tribunal in Moscow and sent to a German POW camp located in Siberia. Bischoff would remain imprisoned in the USSR for the next five years. In October 1955 Bischoff would be among the last German prisoners of war and war criminals to be released from captivity by the Soviet Union. After resettling in West Germany, Bischoff was employed by the German Red Cross-Tracing Service from 1957 to 1965.

=== Essen-Dora trial ===
On 17 November 1967 Bischoff and two other former SS officers who had served with him at Mittelbau-Dora, were indicted for war crimes by the district court in Essen. The charges against Bischoff stemmed from his involvement in the series of mass executions that occurred at Mittelbau-Dora between February–April 1945. He was also charged with the use of torture on prisoners under interrogation. Bischoff entered a plea of not guilty.

The trial (known as the Essen-Dora Process) began in November 1967 and would continue for two and a half years. The proceedings included the testimony of over 300 witnesses, among them former Nazi Armaments Minister Albert Speer and the famed inventor of the V-2 rocket, Wernher von Braun, now a premier rocket scientist in the United States. The eminent East German jurist Friedrich Karl Kaul served as counsel for the plaintiffs.

On 5 May 1970 the case against Bischoff was postponed by the court due to reasons of his poor health. He was thus able to avoid being formally convicted of war crimes. The case against Bischoff was dropped on the grounds that:

If the main hearings were to be continued, there were serious grounds for assuming that the defendant [...] would be accused of being guilty of murder in a manner which, according to experts, would lead to an excessive rise of blood pressure.

Other attempts to prosecute Bischoff for his wartime activities also met with little success. An investigation by the district court of West Berlin into his involvement with the Einsatzgruppen killings in Bydgoszcz was discontinued in 1971, citing a lack of evidence. A further effort to prosecute Bischoff, this time for atrocities committed during his tenure as the Gestapo chief of Poznań, was likewise abandoned in 1976, once again owing to Bischoff's precarious health. Bischoff continued to reside in West Germany for the remainder of his life. He died in Hamburg on 1 January 1993.

== See also ==
- Glossary of Nazi Germany
- List of Nazi Party leaders and officials
