= Erna Petermann =

Nazi concentration camp overseer (born 1912)

- Born: 1912
- Disappeared: 1944
- Occupation: Overseer

Erna Petermann (born 1912, date of death unknown) was the head of the female guards at Grosswerther, a small cap of the Mittelbau-Dora concentration camp. From March 15 until the camp was cleared on April 4, 1945, around 290 Jewish women were held there. Petermann was in charge of eighteen female guards, while an SS officer named Werner Beest ran the camp.

== Biography ==
Little is known about Erna Petermann, other than that she trained at the men's camp at Mittelbau-Dora sometime in 1944. The Schutzstaffel (SS) promoted Petermann to the rank of Lagerführerin (Female Camp Commandant) under a male commandant. Later, Petermann was transferred as Female Camp Commandant to the Großwerther subcamp in the Harz Mountains.

== Disappearance ==
When Großwerther was liberated by the Allies, Petermann fled the camp and went into hiding. Her whereabouts were not discovered and therefore it was not possible to question her regarding possible involvement with war crimes. Her subsequent history and post-war activities remain unknown.

- List of people who disappeared
