= Kohnstein =

Hill in the Harz, Thuringia, Germany

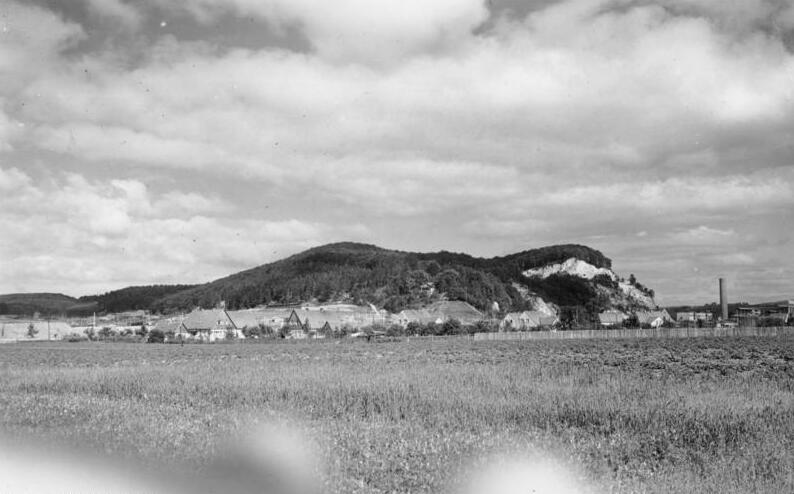

Highest point
- Prominence: 85 m (279 ft)
- Coordinates: 51°32′32″N 10°44′39″E

Geography
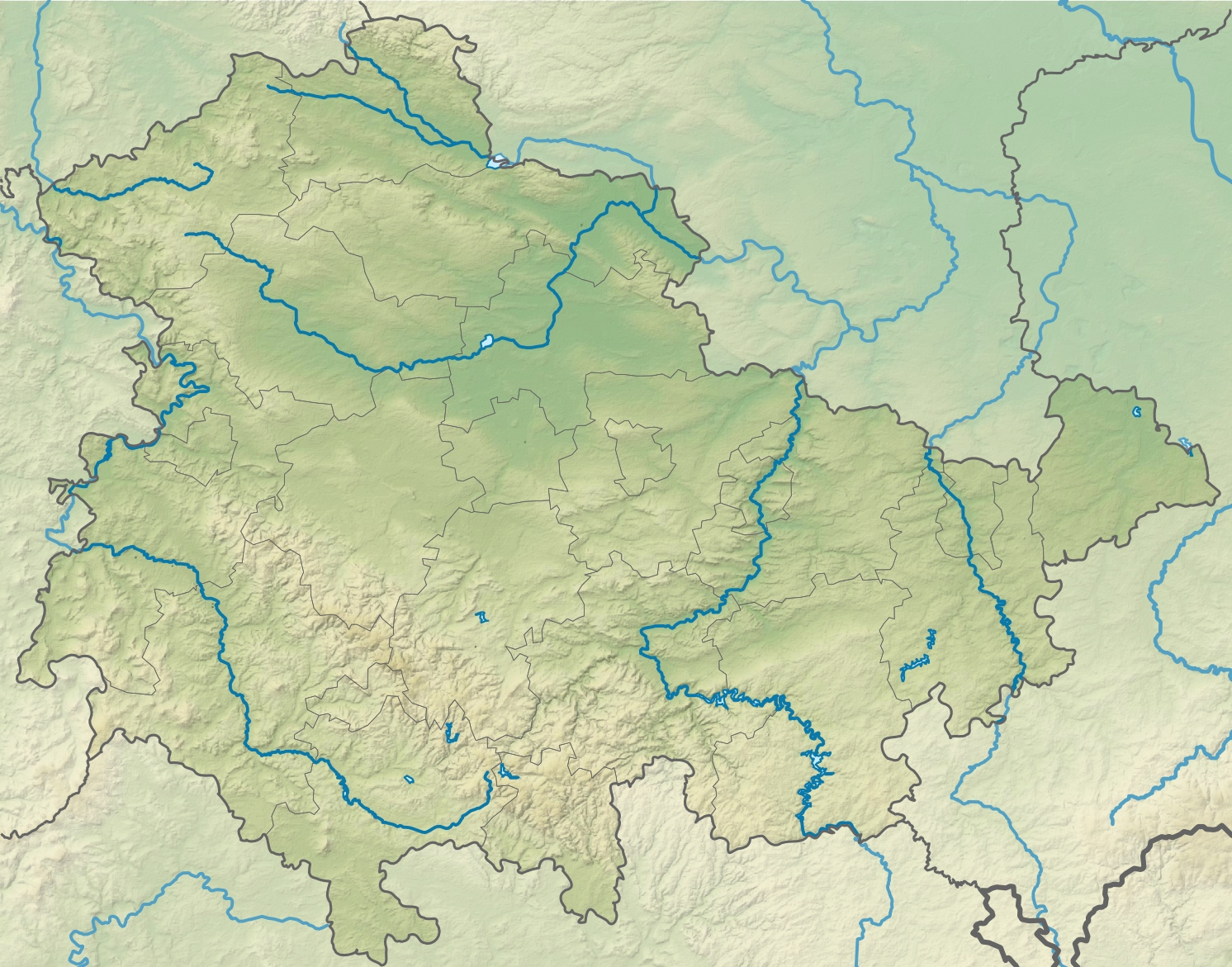
- Location within Thuringia
- Location: Thuringia, Germany

The Kohnstein is a hill in Thuringia, Germany, 2 kilometres southwest of the village of Niedersachswerfen and 3 kilometres northwest of the centre of the town of Nordhausen. Gypsum mining created tunnels in the hill that were later used as a fuel/chemical depot and for Nazi Germany factories, including the Mittelwerk V-2 rocket factory that used Mittelbau-Dora slave labour.

== Chronology ==
1917–1934: The Badische Anilin- und Soda-Fabrik (BASF) purchased the property and mined anhydrite for gypsum.

1935 summer: At the suggestion of IG Farben, the Wirtschaftliche Forschungsgesellschaft (WIFO) (English: Economic Research Company) investigated the mine to centralize a fuel and chemical depot.

1936: Wifo took over the mines to create a highly secret central petroleum reserve. The Government's Industrial Research Association invested some effort in adapting the tunnels and galleries for the storage of critical chemicals like tetra-ethyl-lead (petroleum anti-knock).

1937–1940: Wifo phases I and II to extend the tunnels were completed, and the site stored oil, gasoline, and chemicals; as well as stockpiles of chemical poisons.

1943 July (mid): A production planner for Gerhard Degenkolb (i.e., the A-4 Special Committee), Paul Figge, determined that the site seemed ideal for A-4 production, but Hermann Göring initially forbade the use for missile production (Hitler overruled).

1943 August (end): The Armaments Ministry seized the facility from Hermann Göring's Four-Year Plan organization.

1943 November (late): Mittelwerk GmbH leased the Kohnstein mine from Wifo, the owner.

1943 September early: Albin Sawatzki, Arthur Rudolph, and about ten engineers moved to the Nordhausen plant from Peenemünde.

1943 September: Conversion of tunnels for V-2 rocket production was started.

1944 Spring: Ventilation and heating construction was completed.

1944 May or June: Mittelwerk had to compress all its facilities into tunnels 21-46, disrupting production.

1945 April 11: After previously entering the Nordhausen plant from the North through the Junkers Nordwerke, 3rd US Armored and 104th Infantry Divisions reached the town of Nordhausen on 11 April 1945 and discovered the dead and sick of the Boelcke Kaserne barracks at Mittelbau-Dora.

1945 June: The US Army left the Nordhausen plant as required by JCS Directive 1067/14, with parts, machine tools, and documents (including blueprints for the projected A-9/A-10 intercontinental missile) left for the Soviets.

1948 Summer: The Soviet army demolished both of the entrances of the tunnel system

1995: A new entrance tunnel was dug to former rail Tunnel A. Subsequently, a section of 710 m of the tunnel system was opened for visitors.

After the 1990 reunification of Germany, the tunnels were frequently looted by treasure seekers who gained access via the private mine in the north of the Kohnstein. Large parts of the system are flooded by ground water, while other parts have collapsed. Willi Kramer, a German archaeologist and scientist who dived in the tunnel system in 1992 and 1998, estimated that 70 tons of material was stolen. Access through these entrances was secured not until 2004, when the mine went into insolvency.

External images
- Map of the Mittelwerk complex

== Tourism and walking ==
In 1366 the Hohnstein counts had the Schnabelsburg (a castle, later a daytrippers restaurant) built on the Kohnstein. At Maienkopf there was an open-air stage from 1934 which had 500 seats. In more recent times the Kaiser Way (an old military road or Heerstraße) runs along the Kohnstein. Nearby is the Karst Trail. Around 550 metres east of the summit and about 600 metres northwest of the former Mittelbau-Dora concentration camp is an open area in the woods where several trails meet and known as the Komödienplatz. The Komödienplatz hosts the May festivals of Nordhausen Grammar School (Nordhäuser Gymnasium), founded in 1835; schoolchildren put on Latin comedies.
