= WIFO (Nazi company) =

- Industry: Petroleum
- Founded: August 24, 1934
- Defunct: 1945

Wirtschaftliche Forschungsgesellschaft mbh (WiFo, English: Economic Research Company) was a Nazi Germany-owned company "charged with the construction and operation of solid fuel (natural and synthetic) storage depots."

== Chronology ==
1935 summer: At the suggestion of IG Farben, the Wirtschaftliche Forschungsgesellschaft (Wifo, Economic Research Ltd) investigated the Kohnstein mine to centralize a fuel and chemical depot.
