= Resistance during the Holocaust =

In three cases, entire countries resisted the deportation of their Jewish population during the Holocaust. In other countries, notable individuals or communities created resistance during the Holocaust which helped the Jews escape some concentration camps.

Since 1963, a commission organized by Yad Vashem, the Holocaust Martyrs' and Heroes' Remembrance Authority in Israel, and headed by an Israeli Supreme Court justice, has been charged with the duty of awarding people who rescued Jews from the Holocaust the honorary title Righteous Among the Nations. As of January 2007, 21,758 people have received the honor.

== Diplomats and people of influence ==
In a few cases, individual diplomats and people of influence, such as Oskar Schindler or Nicholas Winton, protected large numbers of Jews. Swedish diplomat Raoul Wallenberg, the Italian Giorgio Perlasca, Chinese consul-general to Austria Ho Feng Shan, and others saved tens of thousands of Jews with fake diplomatic passes.

=== Sweden ===
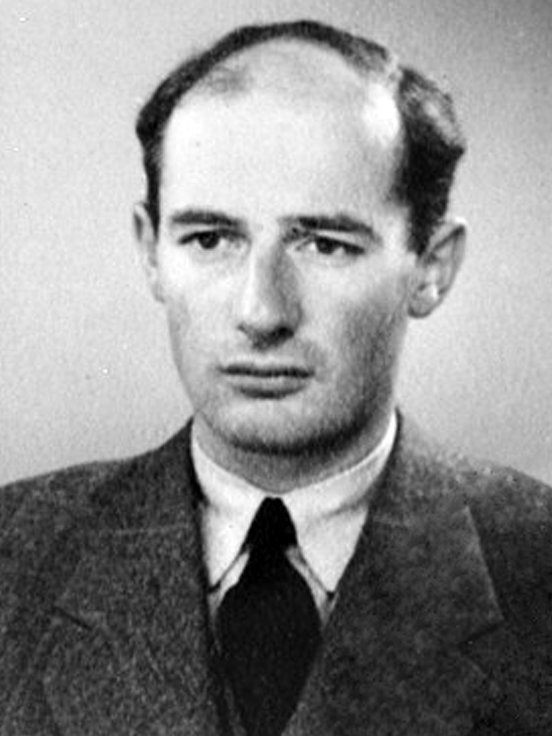
Raoul Wallenberg

Swedish diplomat Raoul Wallenberg and his colleagues saved as many as 100,000 Hungarian Jews by providing them with diplomatic passes.

=== Portugal ===
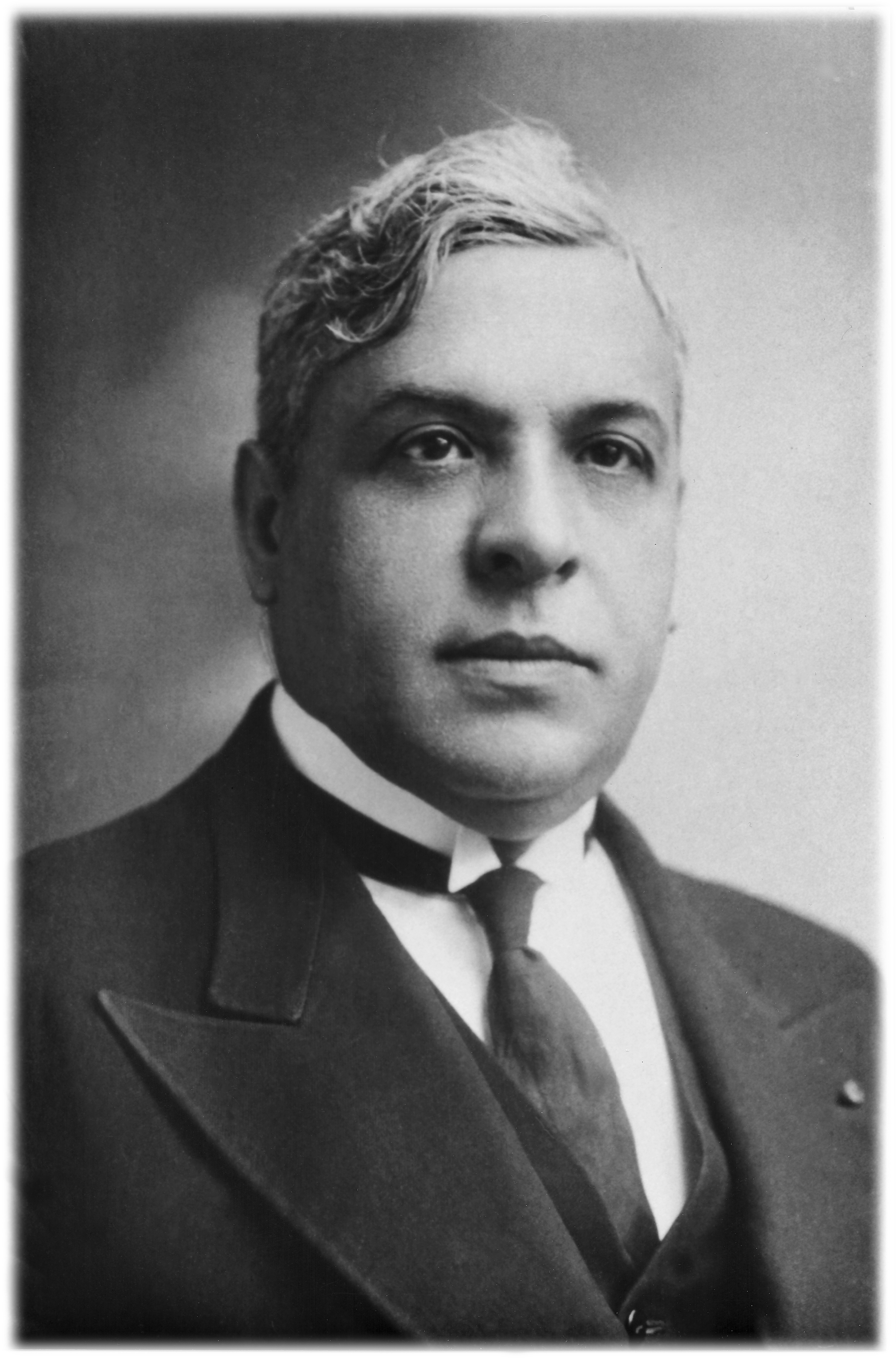
Aristides de Sousa Mendes

Portuguese diplomat Aristides de Sousa Mendes issued thousands of visas to Jews and other persecuted minorities, though it cost him his career in 1940, when Portuguese dictator Salazar forced him out of his job. He died in poverty in 1954.

=== Brazil ===
Brazilian diplomat Luiz Martins de Souza Dantas illegally issued Brazilian diplomatic visas to hundreds of Jews in France during the Vichy Government, saving them from certain death.

=== Netherlands ===
Jan Zwartendijk was the Dutch honorary consul in Kaunas, Lithuania, in 1940. Helping thousands of mainly Polish Jews, he issued visas to Curaçao. In their passports, Zwartendijk stamped the text that no visa was required to enter the Dutch island. He deliberately left out the text that permission from the local governor was needed to obtain entry. This way, it seemed that the holder of the visa could travel to Curaçao without restrictions. This enabled Chiune Sugihara, the Japanese consul in Kaunas (see below) to issue a transit visum for Japan, since the visa holder had a destination outside Japan. Zwartendijk received no honors during his life but was posthumously awarded the Righteous Among the Nations honor in 1997.

=== Japan ===
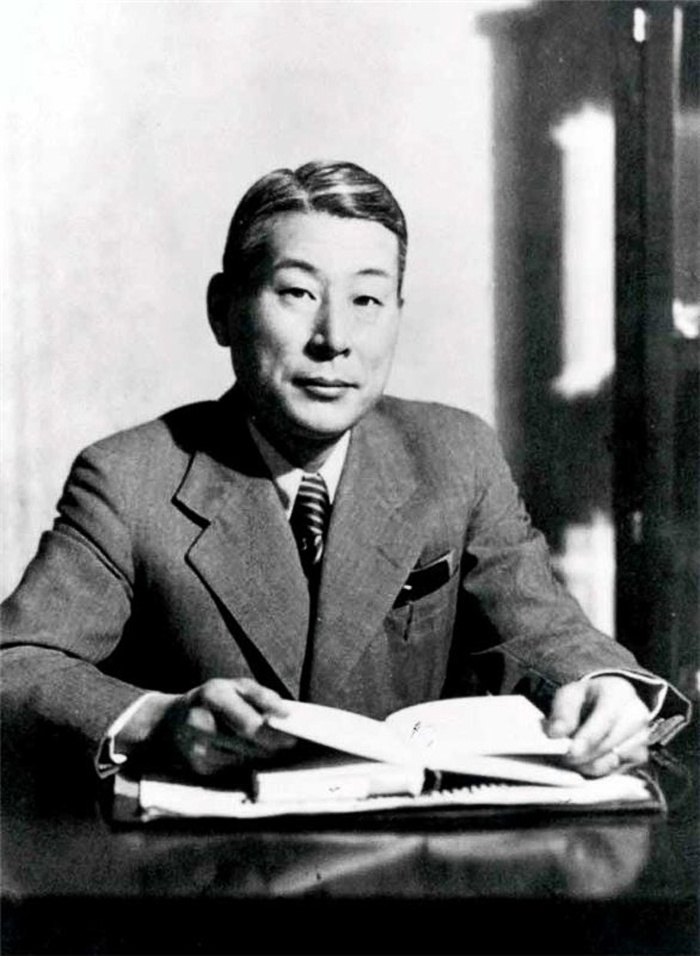
Chiune Sugihara

Chiune Sempo Sugihara, Japanese Consul-General in Kaunas, Lithuania, 1939–1940, issued thousands of visas to Jews fleeing Poland in defiance of explicit orders from the Japanese foreign ministry. The last foreign diplomat to leave Kaunas, Sugihara continued stamping visas from the open window of his departing train. After the war, Sugihara was fired from the Japanese foreign service, ostensibly due to downsizing. In 1985, Sugihara's wife and son received the Righteous Among the Nations honor in Jerusalem, on behalf of the ailing Sugihara, who died in 1986.

=== Iran ===
Abdol Hossein Sardari, head of the Iranian consulate in Paris during the Nazi occupation, argued successfully with the German authorities that all Iranian citizens, including Persian Jews, be free from harassment and be allowed to leave Nazi territory as they wished. After realising the scale of the Germans' intentions, he also issued hundreds of Iranian passports in his consulate to non-Persian Jews, allowing them to go free. He remained a diplomat until the Iranian revolution, after which he was dismissed and died in poverty. Yad Vashem has honoured him several times.

=== Vatican City ===
Although Pope Pius XII did not publicly speak out against the murder of the Jews during the Holocaust, the Vatican did take action to save many Jews in Italy from deportation, including sheltering several hundred Jews in the catacombs of St. Peter's Basilica. In his Christmas addresses of 1941 and 1942, the pontiff was forceful on the topic but did not mention the Nazis by name. The Pope encouraged the bishops to speak out against the Nazi regime and to open the religious houses in their dioceses to hide Jews. In recent years, the Vatican has expressed its remorse for not speaking out with more authority against the genocide.

== Resistance movements ==
=== Germany ===
A group of German intellectuals calling themselves the White Rose distributed leaflets anonymously from 1942 to 1943 calling for opposition to the Holocaust and Hitler. Seven of them were executed.

After the war, the German Democratic Republic attempted to take credit for its own resistance movement. Auschwitz survivor Bruno Baum published a book in East Germany, Widerstand in Auschwitz, claiming that Jewish resistance had been spearheaded by Communist intellectuals, and that he had published a newspaper called Auschwitzer Echo from within Auschwitz itself. These claims are still being investigated.

=== Belgium ===
In April 1943, members of the Belgian resistance group Comité de Défense des Juifs held up the twentieth convoy train to Auschwitz, and freed 231 people (115 of whom escaped the Holocaust).

=== Poland ===
In Poland in 1939, the Jewish population struggled mightily to obtain weapons. The underground non-Jewish groups at this time did not want to share their weapons with the Jews. This forced them to look elsewhere. In order to obtain weapons at this time they had to find the arms that had been buried by the Polish Army at the time of their downfall.

In 1942, a different underground resistance group rose in Poland which was called the Armia Ludowa. The Armia Ludowa, translated to the People's Army, was very weak and did not have many weapons at the rise. However, through the next year more and more people started to join. There were not too many Jewish survivors at this time but the few that did survive joined with the group. The weapons that were used were either brought by peasants or stolen. As stated in the article Jewish Resistance by Yehuda Bauer, weapons were originally from the Soviet Union and were parachuted in.

In 1942, the ghetto of Warsaw became a danger zone. The ghetto was destroyed in many places. It all began with the deportation. On July 28, a group called the Jewish Fighters’ Organization was created. This group lacked weapons which was a common theme. They were able to obtain a few pistols and grenades. After a few failed attempts, their weapons were confiscated and the leaders captured. A new underground group was created in January 1943. The assembly of this group had two machine guns, 14 rifles, over 500 handguns and a large number of homemade grenades. The leader of this underground group was Mordechai Anielwicz, a 23 year old Jewish boy and Ha’Shomer Ha’Tzair. The Warsaw ghetto rebellion lasted longer than six weeks and was outmanned and outgunned. The Germans were backed by tanks and heavy guns. The Nazis ended the rebellion by setting each building on fire in the ghetto and using poison gas to draw Jews out of bunkers. The group was about 750 Jews that were armed, but also it was a few thousand people who did not have weapons but resisted the Nazis and tried everything in their power to escape. This was the first armed uprising against the Nazis.

In Poland during World War 2 there were about 5,000 Jewish fighters and 4,000 of them were killed. Throughout Poland, there were four different rebellions and about 17 places that there were armed resistance groups.

There were also groups, such as the Polish Żegota organization, that took drastic and dangerous steps to rescue victims. Witold Pilecki, a member of Armia Krajowa, the Polish Home Army, organized a resistance movement in Auschwitz from 1940, and Jan Karski tried to spread word of the Holocaust.

The Polish government-in-exile in London tried to alert the world to the Holocaust. One eyewitness reports that there was a shortwave transmitter hidden in Block 11 of Auschwitz concentration camp which sent information directly to London. Between January 1942 and spring 1943, much of the coverage of the London Dziennik Polski was devoted to exposing the Holocaust, and in late 1943 such topics as concentration camps and medical experiments were described in details.

=== Italy ===
In Rome, some 4,000 Italian Jews and prisoners of war avoided deportation, many of them hidden in safe houses or evacuated from Italy by a resistance group organized by an Irish priest, Monsignor Hugh O'Flaherty. Once a Vatican ambassador to Egypt, O'Flaherty used his political connections to help secure sanctuary for dispossessed Jews.

=== The Netherlands ===
The Dutch Resistance to the Nazi occupation of the Netherlands during World War II can be mainly characterized by its prominent non-violence, submitting in over 300,000 people in hiding in the autumn of 1944, tended to by some 60,000 to 200,000 illegal landlords and caretakers and tolerated knowingly by some 1 million people, including German occupiers and military.

=== Jews ===
Jews resisted the Holocaust in both ghettos and in concentration camps.

== Communities ==
Some towns and churches also helped hide Jews and protect others from the Holocaust, such as the French town of Le Chambon-sur-Lignon which sheltered several thousand Jews. Similar individual and family acts of rescue were repeated throughout Europe, as illustrated in the famous cases of Anne Frank, often at great risk to the rescuers.

=== Shanghai ===
Between 1933 and 1941, the Chinese city of Shanghai accepted unconditionally over 30,000 Jewish refugees escaping the Holocaust in Europe, a number greater than those taken in by Shanghai into an area known as the Shanghai ghetto. Some of the Jewish refugees there aided the Chinese resistance against the Japanese. Many of the Jewish refugees in Shanghai migrated to the United States and Israel after 1948 due to the Chinese Civil War.
